= 1948 Jersey Road Race =

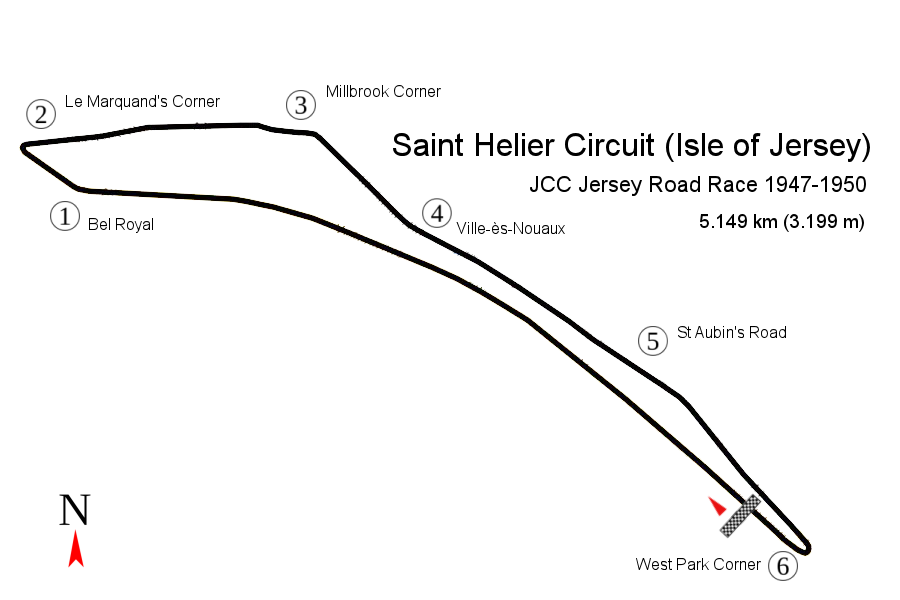

Race details
- Date: 29 April 1948
- Official name: II J.C.C. Jersey Road Race
- Location: Saint Helier, Jersey
- Course length: 5.15 kilometres (3.20 miles)
- Distance: 55 laps, 283.24 kilometres (176.00 miles)

Pole position
Driver	(Thailand) B. Bira	Maserati
- Time: 2:01.4

Fastest lap
Driver	(United Kingdom) Bob Gerard	ERA
- Time: 2:07.4

Podium
First	(United Kingdom) Bob Gerard	ERA
Second	(United Kingdom) George Abecassis	Maserati
Third	(United Kingdom) Reg Parnell	Maserati

The 2nd Jersey Road Race was a Formula One motor race held on 29 April 1948 at the St. Helier Circuit, in Saint Helier, Jersey. The 55-lap race was won by Bob Gerard in an ERA B-Type, setting fastest lap in the process. George Abecassis finished second in a Maserati 6CM, and Reg Parnell was third in a Maserati 4CL. B. Bira started from pole position in another Maserati 4CL but finished fourth following a succession of pit stops for tyres, oil and fuel.

== Results ==
Pos	No.	Driver	Entrant	Constructor	Time/Retired	Grid
1	10	(United Kingdom) Bob Gerard	F.R. Gerard	ERA B-Type	2:00:55.2, 141.34kph	3
2	23	(United Kingdom) George Abecassis	G. Abecassis	Maserati 6CM	+1 lap	7
3	8	(United Kingdom) Reg Parnell	R. Parnell	Maserati 4CL	+1 lap	4
4	1	(Thailand) B. Bira	Prince Chula	Maserati 4CL	+1 lap	1
5	15	(United Kingdom) Bob Ansell	R.E. Ansell	Maserati 4CL	+2 laps	6
6	12	(United Kingdom) John Bolster	P.H. Bell	ERA B-Type	+2 laps	8
7	16	(United Kingdom) Roy Salvadori	R.F. Salvadori	Maserati 4CM	+4 laps	12
8	14	(United Kingdom) Geoffrey Ansell	G.E. Ansell	ERA B-Type	+4 laps	10
9	29	(United Kingdom) Bob Cowell	R.M. Cowell	Lagonda	+7 laps	21
10	27	(United Kingdom) John Benett	Lord Selsdon	Talbot-Lago T26SS	+11 laps	5
11	19	(United Kingdom) Geoff Richardson	G.N. Richardson	ERA-Riley	+12 laps	20
12	22	(United Kingdom) Archie Baring	A.A. Baring	Maserati 6CM	+24 laps	18
13	11	(United Kingdom) Cuth Harrison	T.C. Harrison	ERA B-Type	+30 laps	13
Ret	20	(United Kingdom) Leslie Brooke	H.L. Brooke	ERA B-Type	41 laps, valve	15
Ret	21	(United Kingdom) Sam Gilbey	S.J. Gilbey	Maserati 6CM	33 laps, accident	16
Ret	7	(United Kingdom) Fred Ashmore	R. Parnell	ERA E-Type	24 laps, fuel feed	19
Ret	24	(United Kingdom) John Heath	John Heath	Alta GP	19 laps, timing gears	14
Ret	9	(United Kingdom) David Hampshire	R. Parnell	Delage 15S8	15 laps, ignition	22
Ret	6	(United Kingdom) Joe Ashmore	R. Parnell	ERA A-Type	11 laps, engine	17
Ret	30	(United Kingdom) Bobbie Baird	P.R. Emery & W.R. Baird	Emeryson-Duesenberg	8 laps, gearbox	11
Ret	2	(Italy) Luigi Villoresi	Scuderia Ambrosiana	Maserati 4CLT	6 laps, gearbox	2
Ret	4	(United Kingdom) Raymond Mays	Raymond Mays	ERA B-Type	4 laps, oil pressure	9
DNS	28	(United Kingdom) Tony Rolt	A.P.R. Rolt	Alfa Romeo	cracked valve seats	
DNS	17	(United Kingdom) Barry Woodall	Barry Woodall	Delage	con rod	
DNA	3	(United Kingdom) Leslie Johnson	Leslie G. Johnson	ERA		
DNA	5	(France) Raymond Sommer	Raymond Sommer	CTA-Arsenal		
DNA	18	(United Kingdom) Michael Chorlton	M.C. Chorlton	Bugatti		
DNA	25	(United Kingdom) Leslie Brooke	Gian Volpini	Ferrari		
DNA	26	(United Kingdom) Ian Connell (United Kingdom) Guy Gale	G.F.K. Gale	Talbot-Darracq		

Previous race: 1948 Pau Grand Prix	Formula One non-championship races 1948 season	Next race: 1948 Nations Grand Prix
Previous race: 1947 Jersey Road Race	Jersey Road Race	Next race: 1949 Jersey Road Race
