= 1949 Jersey Road Race =

- Non-championship race in the 1949 Formula One season
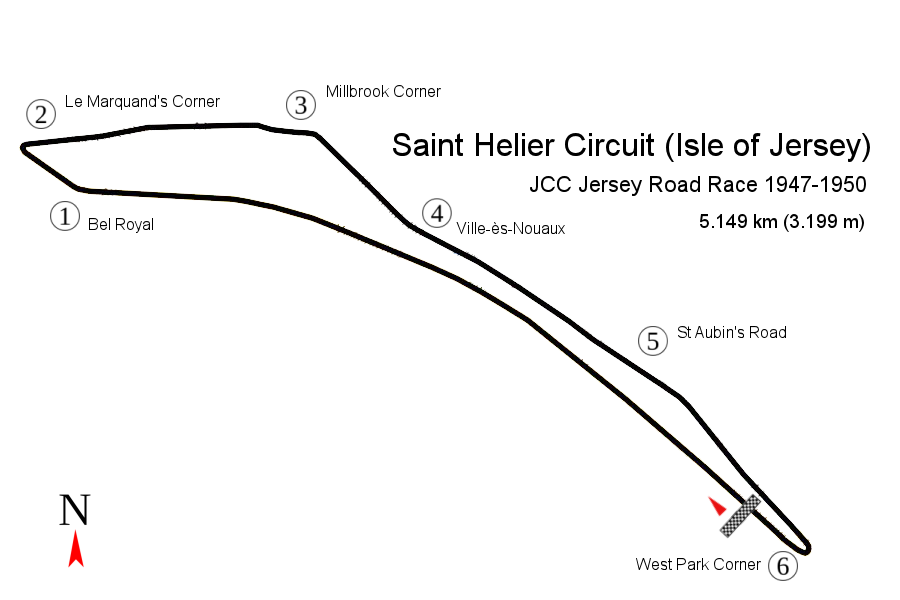

Race details
- Date: 28 April 1949
- Official name: III J.C.C. Jersey Road Race
- Location: Saint Helier, Jersey
- Course length: 5.15 kilometres (3.20 miles)
- Distance: 55 laps, 283.24 kilometres (176.00 miles)

Pole position
Driver	(Italy) Luigi Villoresi	Maserati
- Time: 2:00.0

Fastest lap
Driver	(Italy) Luigi Villoresi	Maserati
- Time: 2:08.1

Podium
First	(United Kingdom) Bob Gerard	ERA
Second	(Switzerland) Emmanuel de Graffenried	Maserati
Third	(United Kingdom) Raymond Mays	ERA

The 3rd Jersey Road Race was a Formula One motor race held on 28 April 1949 at the St. Helier Circuit, in Saint Helier, Jersey. The 55-lap race was won by ERA driver Bob Gerard. Emmanuel de Graffenried finished second in a Maserati, and Raymond Mays was third in another ERA. Maserati driver Luigi Villoresi set pole position and fastest lap but finished sixth.Bugatti driver Kenneth Bear was killed in an accident during practice.

== Results ==
Pos	No.	Driver	Entrant	Constructor	Time/Retired	Grid
1	12	(United Kingdom) Bob Gerard	F.R. Gerard	ERA B-Type	2:16:58.6, 124.08kph	12
2	2	(Switzerland) Emmanuel de Graffenried	Enrico Plate	Maserati 4CLT/48	+1:40.6	5
3	14	(United Kingdom) Raymond Mays	R. Mays	ERA D-Type	+2:27.2	11
4	1	(Thailand) B. Bira	Prince Birabonse	Maserati 4CLT/48	+1 lap	2
5	5	(United Kingdom) Fred Ashmore	R. Parnell	Maserati 4CLT/48	+1 lap	10
6	3	(Italy) Luigi Villoresi	Scuderia Ambrosiana	Maserati 4CLT/48	+1 lap	1
7	10	(United Kingdom) Peter Whitehead	P.N. Whitehead	Ferrari 125	+2 laps	7
8	16	(United Kingdom) David Hampshire	D.N. Hampshire	ERA B-Type	+3 laps	13
9	6	(United Kingdom) Bob Ansell	R.E. Ansell	Maserati 4CL	+3 laps	21
10	8	(United Kingdom) David Murray	D. Murray	Maserati 4CL	+5 laps	15
11	17	(United Kingdom) Geoff Ansell (United Kingdom) Brian Shawe-Taylor	G.E. Ansell	ERA B-Type	+5 laps	18
12	26	(United Kingdom) John Heath	J.B. Heath	HWM-Alta	+5 laps	20
Ret	19	(United Kingdom) George Nixon	G.R. Nixon	ERA A-Type	49 laps, accident	17
Ret	15	(United Kingdom) John Bolster	P.H. Bell	ERA B-Type	46 laps, valves	8
Ret	9	(United Kingdom) Duncan Hamilton (United Kingdom) Philip Fotheringham-Parker	J.D. Hamilton & P. Fotheringham-Parker	Maserati 6CM	29 laps, radiator	19
Ret	22	(Monaco) Louis Chiron	Ecurie France	Talbot-Lago T26C	14 laps, brakes	4
Ret	24	(United Kingdom) Frank le Gallais	Lord Selsdon	Talbot-Lago T26C	6 laps, gearbox	14
Ret	4	(United Kingdom) Reg Parnell	R. Parnell	Maserati 4CLT/48	4 laps, fuel pump	6
Ret	20	(United Kingdom) George Abecassis	G.E. Abecassis	Alta GP	1 lap, rear axle	16
DNS	6	(United Kingdom) George Bainbridge	R.E. Ansell	Maserati 4CL	car driven by Bob Ansell	
DNS	11	(United Kingdom) Leslie Johnson	T.A.S.O. Mathieson	ERA E-Type		3
DNS	14	(United Kingdom) Ken Richardson	R. Mays	ERA D-Type	car driven by Mays	
DNS	18	(United Kingdom) Cuth Harrison	T.C. Harrison	ERA C-Type		9
DNS	25	(United Kingdom) Kenneth Bear	K.W. Bear	Bugatti Type 59	crashed during practice, fatal accident	
DNQ	7	(United Kingdom) Archie Baring	A.A. Baring	Maserati 4CM		(22)
DNQ	21	(United Kingdom) Michael Chorlton	M.C. Chorlton	CDL-Bugatti		(25)
DNQ	23	(Belgium) Johnny Claes	Ecurie Belge	Talbot-Lago T26C		(24)
DNQ	28	(United Kingdom) Oscar Moore	O.B. Moore	OBM-BMW 328		(23)
DNA	27	(United Kingdom) Gordon Watson	G.M. Watson	Ferrari 166C		
DNA	29	(United Kingdom) Sid Logan	S.G. Logan	Cooper T9-JAP		

Previous race: 1949 Paris Grand Prix	Formula One non-championship races 1949 season	Next race: 1949 Roussillon Grand Prix
Previous race: 1948 Jersey Road Race	Jersey Road Race	Next race: 1950 Jersey Road Race
