= Saint Helier Circuit =

Motor racing course in Jersey

(Jersey) Saint Helier Circuit
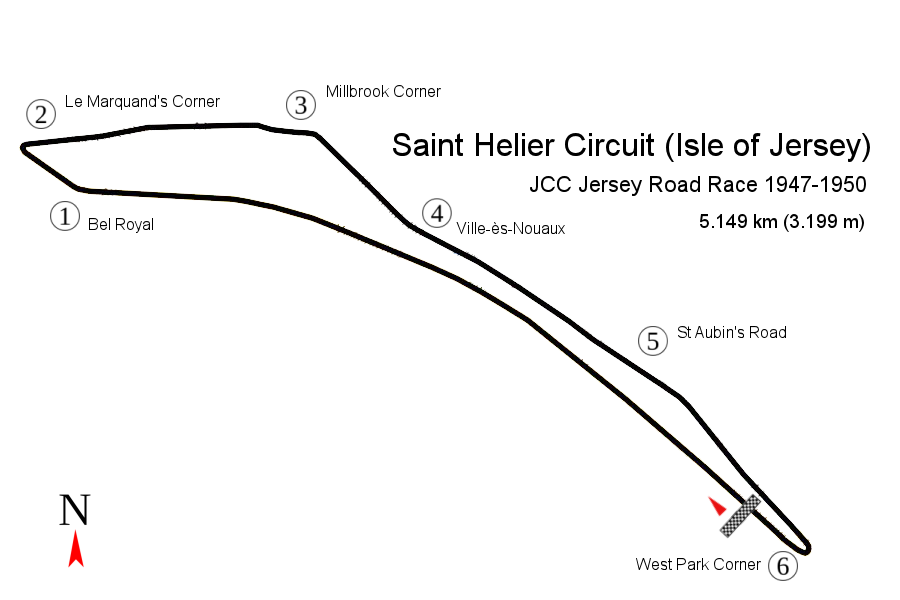
- Grand Prix Circuit (1947–1952)
- Location: Saint Helier, Jersey
- Coordinates: 49°11′21″N 2°7′11″W
- Major events: J.C.C. Jersey Road Race

Grand Prix Circuit (1947–1952)
- Length: 5.149 km (3.199 mi)
- Turns: 5
- Race lap record: 2:02.0 ( (United Kingdom) David Hampshire, Maserati 4CLT/48, 1950, F1)

The 1947 St Helier Circuit was a 5.149 km (3.199 mi) Grand Prix road course in the town of Saint Helier, the capital of Jersey which is the largest of the North Sea Channel Islands (English Channel), hosting four consecutive Grand Prix events (official name: J.C.C. Jersey Road Race) from 1947 to 1950, the last one a Formula One non-championship round. The circuit length remained largely the same over its four editions except for small variances within 100 meters. British entries with Peter Whitehead, Reg Parnell, Raymond Mays, Peter Walker, Cuth Harrison, Leslie Johnson and David Hampshire among many others dominated the series, winning all events over many top drivers of the era.

== J.C.C. Jersey Road Race ==
Year	Name	Date	Winning drivers	Constructor	Regulations	Report
1947	I J.C.C. Jersey Road Race	May 8	(United Kingdom) Reg Parnell	Maserati 4CL	Grand Prix	Report
1948	II J.C.C. Jersey Road Race	April 29	(United Kingdom) Bob Gerard	ERA B-Type 'R14B'	Grand Prix	Report
1949	III J.C.C. Jersey Road Race	April 28	(United Kingdom) Bob Gerard	ERA B-Type 'R14B'	Grand Prix	Report
1950	IV J.C.C. Jersey Road Race	July 9	(United Kingdom) Peter Whitehead	Ferrari 125-10C	Formula One	Report
1952	Jersey International Road Race	July 10	(United Kingdom) Ian Stewart	Jaguar XK120C	Sports Car	Report

== Jersey Road Race - Notable Drivers ==
Louis Chiron - B. Bira - Raymond Sommer - Luigi Villoresi - Giuseppe Farina - Emmanuel de Graffenried - Clemar Bucci - Jean-Pierre Wimille - Louis Rosier
