= 1950 Jersey Road Race =

- Non-championship race in the 1950 Formula One season
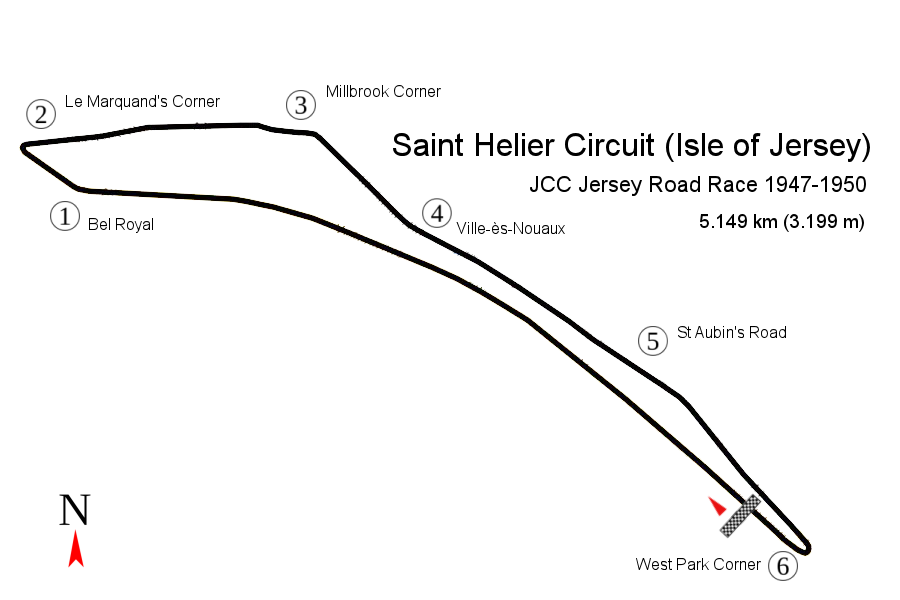

Race details
- Date: 9 July 1950
- Official name: IV J.C.C. Jersey Road Race
- Location: Saint Helier, Jersey
- Course length: 5.150 km ( miles)
- Distance: 55 laps, 277.791 km ( miles)

Pole position
Driver	(United Kingdom) David Hampshire	Maserati
- Time: 2:02.4

Fastest lap
Driver	(United Kingdom) David Hampshire	Maserati
- Time: 2:02.0

Podium
First	(United Kingdom) Peter Whitehead	Ferrari
Second	(United Kingdom) Reg Parnell	Maserati
Third	(Switzerland) Toulo de Graffenried	Maserati

The 1950 Jersey Road Race was a Non-Championship Formula One motor race held on 9 July 1950 at the St. Helier Circuit, in Saint Helier, Jersey. It was the twelfth race of the 1950 Formula One season. The 55-lap race was won by Ferrari driver Peter Whitehead. Reg Parnell finished second in a Maserati, and Toulo de Graffenried third, also in a Maserati.

== Results ==
Pos	No.	Driver	Entrant	Constructor	Time/Retired	Grid
1	10	(United Kingdom) Peter Whitehead	Peter Whitehead	Ferrari	1.56:02.6	2
2	5	(United Kingdom) Reg Parnell	Scuderia Ambrosiana	Maserati	54 laps	7
3	3	(Switzerland) Toulo de Graffenried	Enrico Platé	Maserati	54 laps	5
4	11	(United Kingdom) Bob Gerard	Bob Gerard	ERA	54 laps	3
5	15	(United Kingdom) Brian Shawe-Taylor	Brian Shawe-Taylor	ERA	54 laps	6
6	18	(United Kingdom) Geoffrey Crossley	Geoffrey Crossley	Alta	51 laps	17
7	14	(United Kingdom) Graham Whitehead	Graham Whitehead	ERA	51 laps	18
8	19	(Republic of Ireland) Joe Kelly	Joe Kelly	Alta	51 laps	9
9	16	(United Kingdom) Joe Ashmore	David Hampshire	ERA	50 laps	13
10	21	(United Kingdom) Charles Mortimer	A.A. Baring	HWM-Alta	50 laps	16
11	9	(Switzerland) Toni Branca	Vicomtesse de Walckiers	Simca-Gordini	50 laps	15
12	8	(United Kingdom) Duncan Hamilton (United Kingdom) Philip Fotheringham-Parker	D. Hamilton & P. Fotheringham-Parker	Maserati	49 laps	12
Ret	6	(United Kingdom) David Hampshire	Sucderia Ambrosiana	Maserati	Magneto	1
Ret	22	(United Kingdom) Bill Aston	Bill Aston	Cooper-JAP	Piston	14
Ret	23	(United Kingdom) Bill Merrick	Bill Merrick	Cooper-JAP	Piston	19
Ret	7	(United Kingdom) David Murray	Sucderia Ambrosiana	Maserati	Induction manifold	11
Ret	12	(United Kingdom) Cuth Harrison	Cuth Harrison	ERA	Carburettor needle	4
Ret	4	(Thailand) Prince Bira	Enrico Platé	Maserati	Supercharger	10
Ret	17	(United Kingdom) Tony Rolt	Rob Walker Racing Team	Delage	Engine	8
DNS	24	(United Kingdom) Sid Logan	Sid Logan	Cooper-JAP		(20)
DNQ	20	(United Kingdom) Archie Butterworth	A.J. Butterworth	A.J.B.-Steyr		–
DNP	17	(United Kingdom) Jack Playford	Rob Walker Racing Team	Delage	Alternative driver	–
DNP	21	(United Kingdom) Alister Baring	A.A. Baring	HWM-Alta	Alternative driver	–
DNA	1	(Monaco) Louis Chiron	Officine Alfieri Maserati	Maserati		–
DNA	2	(Italy) Franco Rol	Officine Alfieri Maserati	Maserati		–
DNA	9	(United Kingdom) Leslie Brooke	Leslie Brooke	Maserati		–

Previous race: 1950 Bari Grand Prix	Formula One non-championship races 1950 season	Next race: 1950 Albi Grand Prix
Previous race: 1949 Jersey Road Race	Jersey Road Race	Next race: 1951 Jersey Road Race
