= 1947 Jersey Road Race =

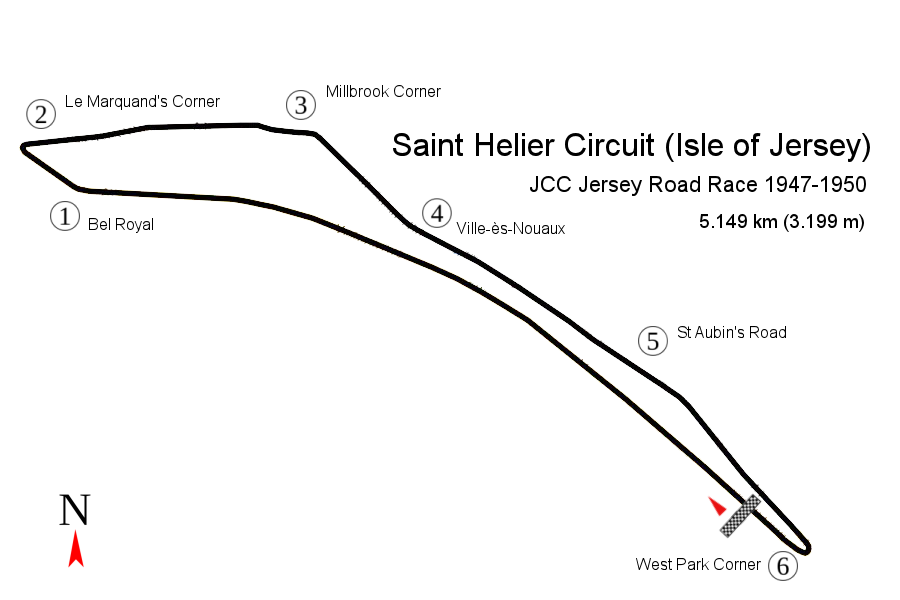

Race details
- Date: 8 May 1947
- Official name: I J.C.C. Jersey Road Race
- Location: Saint Helier, Jersey
- Course length: 5.149 kilometres (3.199 miles)
- Distance: 50 laps, 257.44 kilometres (159.97 miles)

Pole position
Driver	(Thailand) B. Bira	Maserati
- Time: 2:06.4

Fastest lap
Driver	(France) Raymond Sommer	Maserati
- Time: 2:06.2

Podium
First	(United Kingdom) Reg Parnell	Maserati
Second	(Monaco) Louis Chiron	Maserati
Third	(United Kingdom) Raymond Mays	ERA

The 1st Jersey Road Race was a Formula One motor race held on 8 May 1947 at the St. Helier Circuit in Saint Helier, Jersey. The 50-lap race was won by Reg Parnell in a Maserati 4CL. Louis Chiron finished second in another 4CL and Raymond Mays was third in an ERA D-Type. B. Bira started from pole position in a Maserati 4CL but retired with engine problems. Raymond Sommer, also in a Maserati, set fastest lap but also retired.

== Qualifying ==
Pos	No.	Driver	Entrant	Constructor	Time
1	4	(Thailand) B. Bira	Prince Chula	Maserati 4CL	2m 6.400s
2	2	(Italy) Nello Pagani	Scuderia Milano	Maserati 4CL	2m 9.000s
3	1	(Monaco) Louis Chiron	Scuderia Milano	Maserati 4CL	2m 10.200s
4	3	(France) Raymond Sommer	Scuderia Milano	Maserati 4CL	2m 10.250s
5	11	(United Kingdom) Raymond Mays	Raymond Mays	ERA D-Type	2m 10.600s
6	18	(United Kingdom) Bob Gerard	F.R. Gerard	ERA B-Type	2m 12.000s
7	8	(United Kingdom) Bob Ansell	Bob Ansell	Maserati 4CL	2m 12.600s
8	12	(United Kingdom) Peter Whitehead	Peter Whitehead	ERA E-Type	2m 12.650s
9	7	(United Kingdom) Reg Parnell	Reg Parnell	Maserati 4CL	2m 13.000s
10	14	(United Kingdom) Peter Walker	Peter Whitehead	ERA B-Type	2m 14.200s
11	6	(United Kingdom) Ian Connell	I. Connell & K. Evans	Maserati 6CM	8 laps, gearbox
12	28	(United Kingdom) Leslie Johnson	Leslie Johnson	Talbot-Lago T150C	2m 17.000s
13	16	(United Kingdom) Billy Cotton (United Kingdom) Wilkie Wilkinson	Billy Cotton	ERA B-Type	2m 18.000s
14	23	(United Kingdom) Barry Woodall	Barry Woodall	Delage 15S8	2m 20.200s
15	26	(France) Pierre Levegh	Ecurie Gersac	Delage 3L	2m 20.600s
16	10	(United Kingdom) Sam Gilby	Sam Gilby	Maserati 6CM	2m 21.000s
17	21	(United Kingdom) Joe Ashmore	Joe Ashmore	ERA A-Type	2m 21.600s
18	15	(United Kingdom) Leslie Brooke	Leslie Brooke	ERA B-Type	2m 22.000s
19	27	(France) Jean Achard	Ecurie Gersac	Delage 3L	2m 22.500s
20	25	(France) Henri Louveau	Ecurie Gersac	Delage 3L	2m 23.400s
21	20	(United Kingdom) John Bolster	P.H.C. Bell	ERA B-Type	2m 24.000s
22	17	(United Kingdom) George Abecassis	George Abecassis	ERA A-Type	2m 25.800s
23	19	(United Kingdom) Cuth Harrison	Cuth Harrison	ERA B-Type	2m 30.600s
24	22	(Italy) Michael Chorlton	F.O. Cleveland-Harmer	Bugatti Type 51A	2m 31.000s
25	29	(France) Serge Pozzoli	Serge Pozzoli	Delahaye 135S	2m 31.500s

== Race ==
Pos	No.	Driver	Entrant	Constructor	Time/Retired	Grid
1	7	(United Kingdom) Reg Parnell	Reg Parnell	Maserati 4CL	1:55:33.0, 136.02kph	9
2	1	(Monaco) Louis Chiron	Scuderia Milano	Maserati 4CL	+1 lap	3
3	11	(United Kingdom) Raymond Mays	Raymond Mays	ERA D-Type	+2 laps	5
4	21	(United Kingdom) Joe Ashmore	Joe Ashmore	ERA A-Type	+2 laps	17
5	25	(France) Henri Louveau	Ecurie Gersac	Delage 3L	+3 laps	20
6	28	(United Kingdom) Leslie Johnson	Leslie Johnson	Talbot-Lago T150C	+4 laps	12
7	26	(France) Pierre Levegh	Ecurie Gersac	Delage 3L	+4 laps	15
8	27	(France) Jean Achard	Ecurie Gersac	Delage 3L	+4 laps	19
9	10	(United Kingdom) Sam Gilby	Sam Gilby	Maserati 6CM	7 laps	16
10	29	(France) Serge Pozzoli	Serge Pozzoli	Delahaye 135S	+8 laps	25
11	20	(United Kingdom) John Bolster	P.H.C. Bell	ERA B-Type	+8 laps	21
12	18	(United Kingdom) Bob Gerard	F.R. Gerard	ERA B-Type	+13 laps	6
13	14	(United Kingdom) Peter Walker	Peter Whitehead	ERA B-Type	+18 laps	10
14	23	(United Kingdom) Barry Woodall	Barry Woodall	Delage 15S8	+32 laps	14
Ret	4	(Thailand) B. Bira	Prince Chula	Maserati 4CL	28 laps, engine	1
Ret	15	(United Kingdom) Leslie Brooke	Leslie Brooke	ERA B-Type	26 laps, con rod	18
Ret	3	(France) Raymond Sommer	Scuderia Milano	Maserati 4CL	23 laps, engine	4
Ret	17	(United Kingdom) George Abecassis	George Abecassis	ERA A-Type	15 laps, ignition	22
Ret	19	(United Kingdom) Cuth Harrison	Cuth Harrison	ERA B-Type	19 laps, engine	23
Ret	16	(United Kingdom) Billy Cotton (United Kingdom) Wilkie Wilkinson	Billy Cotton	ERA B-Type	12 laps, carburettor	13
Ret	22	(Italy) Michael Chorlton	F.O. Cleveland-Harmer	Bugatti Type 51A	12 laps, oil line	24
Ret	6	(United Kingdom) Ian Connell	I. Connell & K. Evans	Maserati 6CM	8 laps, gearbox	11
Ret	2	(Italy) Nello Pagani	Scuderia Milano	Maserati 4CL	7 laps, supercharger	2
Ret	8	(United Kingdom) Bob Ansell	Bob Ansell	Maserati 4CL	2 laps, piston	7
Ret	12	(United Kingdom) Peter Whitehead	Peter Whitehead	ERA E-Type	1 lap, cracked tank	8

Previous race: 1947 Roussillon Grand Prix	Formula One non-championship races 1947 season	Next race: 1947 Marseille Grand Prix
Previous race: —	Jersey Road Race	Next race: 1948 Jersey Road Race
