= David Hampshire =

British racing driver (1917–1990)

- Born: 29 December 1917; Mickleover, Derbyshire, England
- Died: 25 August 1990 (aged 72); Newton Solney, Derbyshire, England

Formula One World Championship career
- Nationality: (United Kingdom) British
- Active years: 1950
- Team: non-works Maserati
- Entries: 2
- Championships: 0
- Wins: 0
- Podiums: 0
- Career points: 0
- Pole positions: 0
- Fastest laps: 0
- First entry: 1950 British Grand Prix
- Last entry: 1950 French Grand Prix

David Alan Hampshire (29 December 1917 – 25 August 1990) was a British racing driver from England. He was born in Mickleover, Derbyshire and died in Newton Solney, in South Derbyshire.

Hampshire first appeared amongst Bira, Villoresi, Tony Rolt, Raymond Mays, Peter Whitehead, Leslie Brooke and Reg Parnell in the 1939 Nuffield Trophy at Donington Park. However, the Maserati 6CL which he was driving, formerly owned by Arthur Dobson and re-engineered into an 1,100 cc (67 cu in) car, only managed a few laps, retiring with a melted piston. The car was subsequently returned to 1,500 cc (92 cu in) format. He raced the 6CL again at the 1939 Brooklands Whit Monday meeting and the Sydenham Trophy at Crystal Palace on 20 May (televised by the BBC). It had a final outing at Donington Park on 12 August 1939 just before the outbreak of World War 2.

After the Second World War, there were virtually no circuits in England to begin with so sprints were undertaken at Gransden Lodge and Shelsley Walsh. Later in 1946, he competed in his Delage 158L (a 1927 GP car) in the Albi Grand Prix and the Grand Prix des Nations in which he finished eighth.

In 1947, Hampshire first drove Reg Parnell's "The Challenger" in the British Empire Trophy and Parnell's ERA E-type (GP1) at Lausanne both ending in retirements.

On the whole, 1948 was more fruitful: Hampshire finished second in his Delage 158L in the 1948 British Empire Trophy at Douglas, Isle of Man, and seventh in the Zandvoort Grand Prix in the Netherlands. He also competed in that year's Jersey Road Race.

In 1949, with the newly acquired (but 10-year-old) ERA R12b he was fourth in the British Grand Prix at Silverstone and also fourth at the Goodwood Trophy. There were top ten results in the Jersey Road Race and the British Empire Trophy, an 11th position at the International Trophy Meeting, but retirements at the Albi and Lausanne GPs.

During the 1950 Formula One season, Hampshire competed in two World Championship Formula One Grands Prix, and numerous non-Championship Formula One races. He took pole position for the non-Championship Jersey Road Race in the Scuderia Ambrosiana Maserati 4CLT, but his maiden Formula One win eluded him when the car's magneto failed. Nevertheless, he recorded the fastest lap of the race, which was won by Peter Whitehead in a Ferrari. Later in the season he did finally manage to take a Formula One race victory in the 1950 Nottingham Trophy at Gamston, which he won in a Scuderia Ambrosiana Maserati 4CLT.

Hampshire competed in the 1951 24 Hours of Le Mans race in a works Aston Martin DB2 where, along with his friend, Reg Parnell, he finished third in class and seventh overall.

== Complete Formula One World Championship results ==
(key)

Year	Entrant	Chassis	Engine	1	2	3	4	5	6	7	WDC	Points
1950	Scuderia Ambrosiana	Maserati 4CLT/48	Maserati Straight-4	GBR; 9	MON	500	SUI	BEL	FRA; Ret	ITA	NC	0
