= Swedish Grand Prix (disambiguation) =

The Swedish Grand Prix was a round of the Formula One World Championship from 1973 to 1978.

Swedish Grand Prix may also refer to:

- Swedish Winter Grand Prix, a former motor race held on the ice of frozen lakes
- Swedish motorcycle Grand Prix
- Speedway Grand Prix of Sweden
