= Rämen =

Lake in Dalarna, Sweden

Lake Rämen
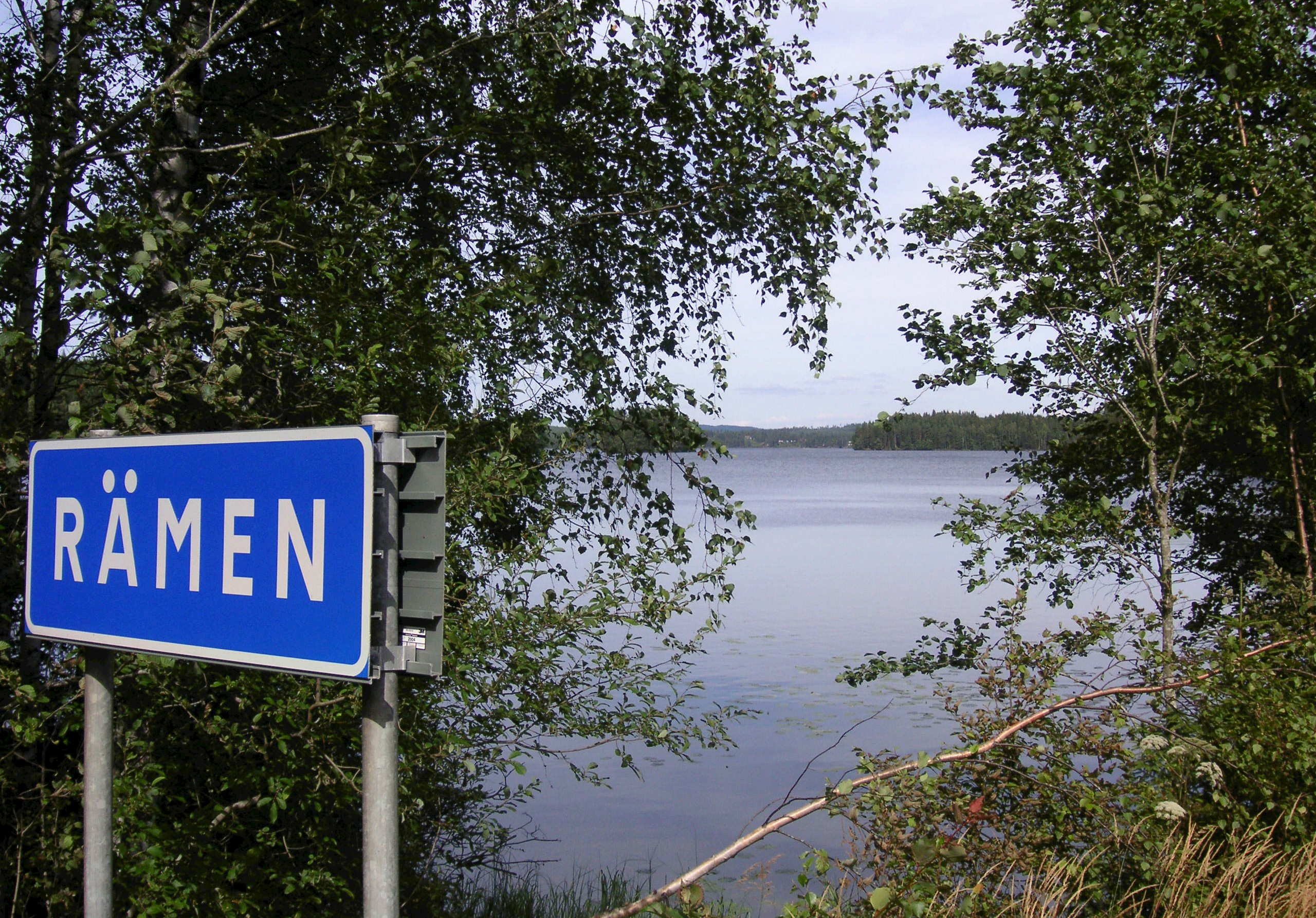
- Lake Rämen towards northeast, 2007

- Location within Sweden
- Location: Dalarna, Sweden
- Coordinates: 60°18′N 15°11′E
- Surface area: 7.8 km^{2} (3.0 sq mi)
- Surface elevation: 245 m (804 ft)

Rämen (Swedish pronunciation: [ˈrɛ̌mːɛn]) is a lake in southern Dalarna circa 25 kilometres (16 miles) southwest of Borlänge. The lake is situated 245 metres (804 ft) above sea level and has an area of 7.8 square kilometres (3.0 sq mi).

In the 1930s auto racing was held on and around the lake, one of the races was the Swedish Winter Grand Prix.
