= ERA Mini Turbo =

Modified Mini city car (1989–1991)

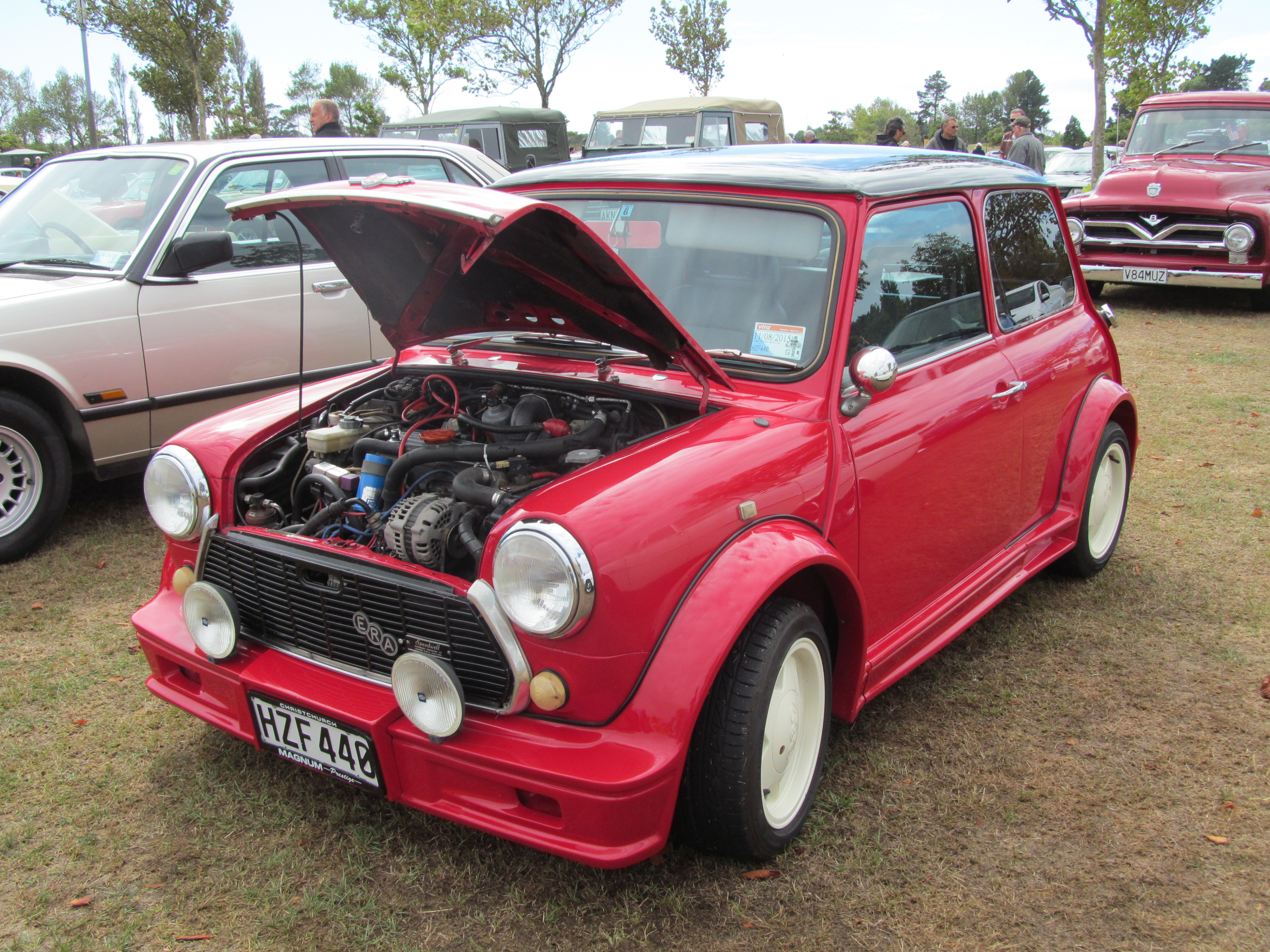

Overview
- Manufacturer: English Racing Automobiles
- Production: 1989–1991
- Assembly: Dunstable, Bedfordshire

Body and chassis
- Class: City car
- Body style: 2-door saloon
- Layout: Front-engine, FWD

Powertrain
- Engine: Austin A-series 1.3 litre turbocharged I4
- Transmission: 4-speed manual

Dimensions
- Length: 120.5 in (3,061 mm)
- Width: 61.25 in (1,556 mm)
- Height: 53 in (1,346 mm)
- Kerb weight: 14 1/2 long cwt (737 kg; 1,624 lb)

The ERA Mini Turbo is a modified Mini city car that was produced by English Racing Automobiles under the ERA brand name from 1989 to 1991 at Dunstable in Bedfordshire, England. The fastest-ever version of the original Mini to be sold through official dealers, it has been described as "the spiritual successor to the Cooper and the 1275 GT".

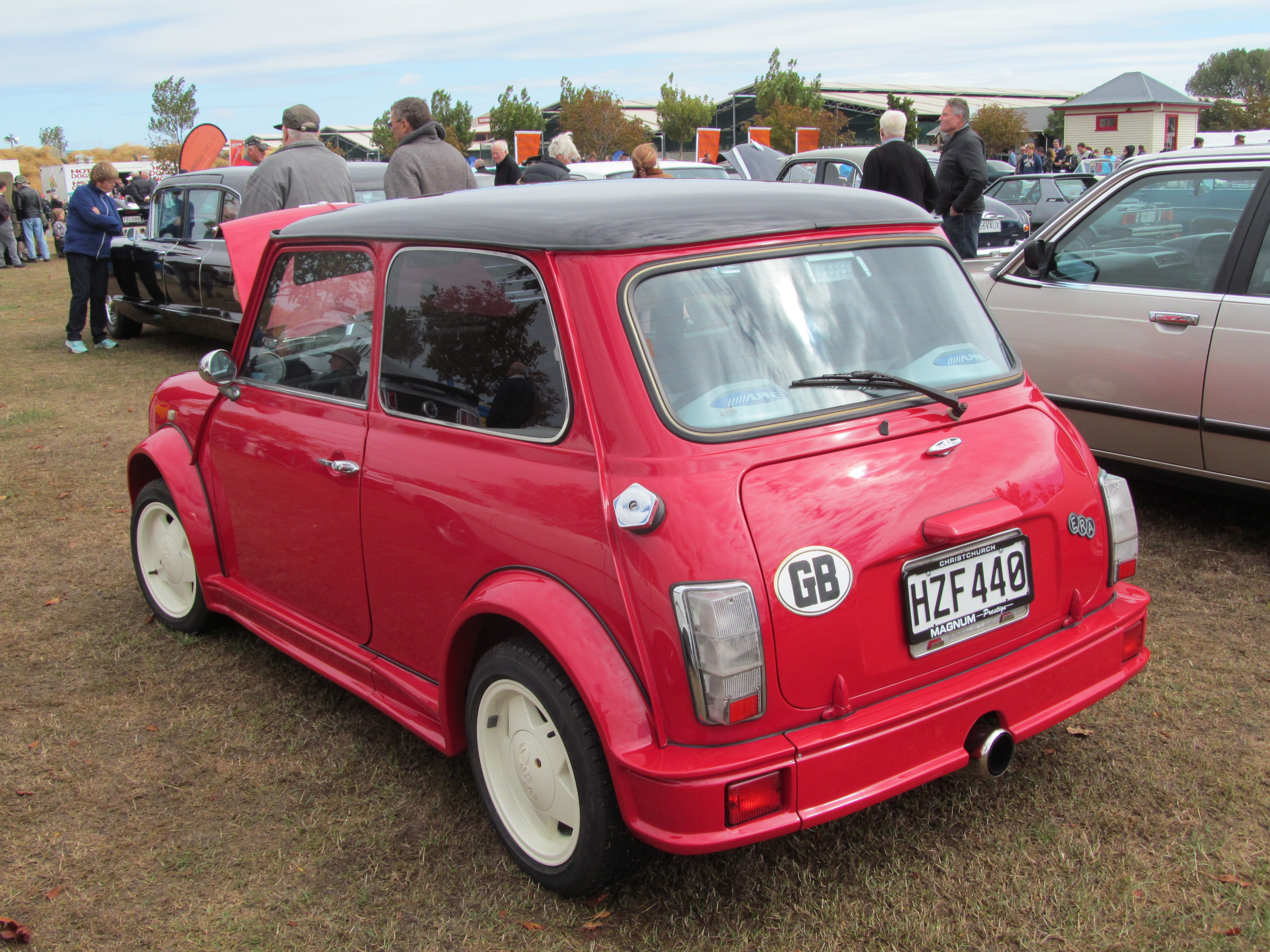
Rear

To create the car, ERA installed a turbocharged Austin Rover A-Series 1300 MG Metro engine, which produces 94 bhp (70 kW) at 6200 rpm and gave the car a claimed top speed of 115 mph (185 km/h), in a standard Mini and modified the body, suspension, brakes, water and oil cooling systems, and interior. The body kit was styled by Dennis Adams, who also designed the Marcos sports cars and the Probe 16 (the car used in 'A Clockwork Orange').

The car, which uses mostly Austin Rover components, was marketed through Austin Rover dealers.

The interior has specially narrowed MG Metro front seats trimmed in Connolly Leather hide or a mix of grey tweed and leather, VDO instruments in an ERA-designed dash panel, pile carpeting, and a sunroof.

Torque steer, common in a front-wheel drive layout, is mitigated by greater front-wheel toe-out and specially-made lower front suspension arms that provide 1.5 degrees of negative camber. The 6" x 13" aluminium alloy wheels are intended for either Goodyear or Dunlop 165/60HR13 low-profile tyres.

The servo-assisted braking system has Metro ventilated discs and four-pot calipers at the front, with modified drums at the rear. The car has adjustable shock absorbers all round, and the ride height is lowered.

A total of 436 ERA Mini Turbos were produced.
