= Swedish Winter Grand Prix =

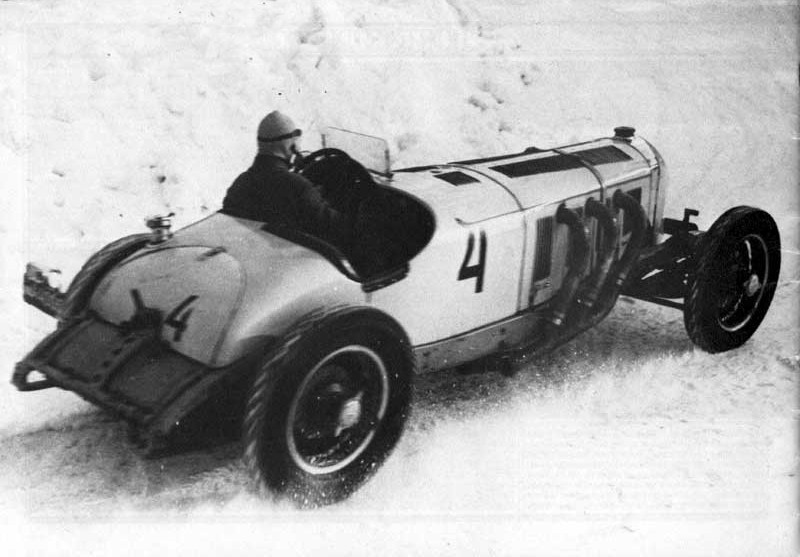

Race information
- Number of times held: 5
- First held: 1931
- Last held: 1947
- Most wins (drivers): no repeat winners
- Most wins (constructors): Alfa Romeo (2)
- Circuit length: 5.2 km (3.2 miles)
- Race length: 103.5 km (64.1 miles)
- Laps: 20 laps

Last race (1947)

Pole position
- no qualifying

Podium
- 1. (United Kingdom) Reg Parnell; ERA; 2. (United Kingdom) Leslie Brooke; ERA; 3. (United Kingdom) George Abecassis; ERA

Fastest lap
- (United Kingdom) Leslie Brooke; ERA; 2:51.8

The Swedish Winter Grand Prix was a race held on the ice of frozen lakes, similar to races held in Estonia, Finland and Norway. The 1930s also saw the Swedish Summer Grand Prix, which can be seen as a predecessor of the Swedish Grand Prix, which was a round of the Formula One World Championship from 1973 to 1978.

== History ==
=== Pre-war ===
While racing in Sweden had a long history it was not until 1931 that a race was first titled Grand Prix. The first Swedish Winter Grand Prix was held on a mammoth 46 kilometre circuit near Lake Rämen, with a lap time of approximately 35 minutes. In an entry that included Rudolf Caracciola, the race was claimed by Finnish Mercedes racer Karl Ebb in the first Grand Prix victory of his ice racing career. Sven Olaf Bennström won the second race the following year with Per-Viktor Widengren winning the third race in an Alfa Romeo monoposto.

Later the same year the first Swedish Summer Grand Prix was held on a 30 kilometre circuit at Norra Vram. The Winter Grand Prix was held again in 1936 with Eugen Bjørnstad claiming another monoposto Alfa Romeo victory but the huge crowds of the earlier years did not return and the Winter Grand Prix was not held again until after the war in 1947.

=== Post-war ===
The 1947 race was held on a circuit surrounding a Swedish Air Force site at Rommehed. Only four cars started and three finished, all visiting British ERAs, after the ship carrying the bulk of the grid was not able to make its destination. As the race was for cars complying with the new International Formula that was later called "Formula One", this is considered by some as the first Formula One race.

== Winners of the Swedish Winter Grand Prix ==
| Year | Driver | Constructor | Location | Report |
|---|---|---|---|---|
| 1947 | (United Kingdom) Reg Parnell | ERA | Rommehed | Report |
| 1946 - 1937 | Not held | | | |
| 1936 | (Norway) Eugen Bjørnstad | Alfa Romeo | Lake Rämen | Report |
| 1935 | Not held | | | |
| 1934 | Not held | | | |
| 1933 | (Sweden) Per-Viktor Widengren | Alfa Romeo | Lake Rämen | Report |
| 1932 | (Sweden) Sven Olaf Bennström | Ford Special | Lake Rämen | Report |
| 1931 | (Finland) Karl Ebb | Mercedes-Benz SSK | Lake Rämen | Report |
