= Scuderia Ambrosiana =

- Full name: Scuderia Ambrosiana
- Base: Milan, Italy
- Founder(s): Franco Cortese, Giovanni Lurani, Eugenio Minetti, Luigi Villoresi
- Noted drivers: (United Kingdom) David Hampshire (United Kingdom) David Murray (United Kingdom) Reg Parnell

Formula One World Championship career
- First entry: 1950 British Grand Prix
- Races entered: 6 (5 starts)
- Race victories: 0
- Pole positions: 0
- Fastest laps: 0
- Final entry: 1954 British Grand Prix

Scuderia Ambrosiana was an Italian motor racing team that competed in Grand Prix motor racing and the Formula One World Championship. The team was founded in 1937 by drivers Giovanni Lurani, Luigi Villoresi, Franco Cortese and Eugenio Minetti and was named after the patron saint of Milan, Saint Ambrose. The team's cars were painted in blue and black after the colours of F.C. Internazionale Milano, which at the time went under the name Ambrosiana Inter.

The team competed at the Targa Florio in 1937, 1938 and 1939, where it finished second, third, and second again with Lurani, Cortese and Villoresi. Cortese took also part at the German Grand Prix in 1938, where he finished ninth. In 1947 future World Champion Alberto Ascari drove for the team. Other drivers associated with Scuderia Ambrosiana include Tazio Nuvolari, Reg Parnell, Leslie Brooke and Clemar Bucci.

Between 1950 and 1954 Scuderia Ambrosiana competed sporadically in the Formula One World Championship. Their best result was ninth place in their first event, the 1950 British Grand Prix, with David Hampshire in a Maserati 4CL. The team's last entry was at the 1954 British Grand Prix, Reg Parnell retiring his Ferrari 500.

In 1951 Lurani and Giovanni Bracco took part in the 24 Hours of Le Mans with a Lancia Aurelia B20, finishing twelfth.

== Formula One results ==
(key) (results in bold indicate pole position) (results in italics indicate fastest lap)

Year	Chassis	Engine	Driver	1	2	3	4	5	6	7	8	9
1950	Maserati 4CL; Maserati 4CLT/48	Maserati 1.5-litre L4		GBR	MON	500	SUI	BEL	FRA	ITA		
1950	Maserati 4CL; Maserati 4CLT/48	Maserati 1.5-litre L4	(United Kingdom) David Hampshire	9					Ret			
1950	Maserati 4CL; Maserati 4CLT/48	Maserati 1.5-litre L4	(United Kingdom) David Murray	Ret						Ret		
1950	Maserati 4CL; Maserati 4CLT/48	Maserati 1.5-litre L4	(United Kingdom) Reg Parnell						Ret			
1951	Maserati 4CLT/48	Maserati 1.5-litre L4		SUI	500	BEL	FRA	GBR	GER	ITA	ESP	
1951	Maserati 4CLT/48	Maserati 1.5-litre L4	(United Kingdom) David Murray					Ret	DNS			
1954	Ferrari 500	Ferrari 2.5-litre L4		ARG	500	BEL	FRA	GBR	GER	SUI	ITA	ESP
1954	Ferrari 500	Ferrari 2.5-litre L4	(United Kingdom) Reg Parnell					Ret				

== Gallery of Scuderia Ambrosiana representatives ==
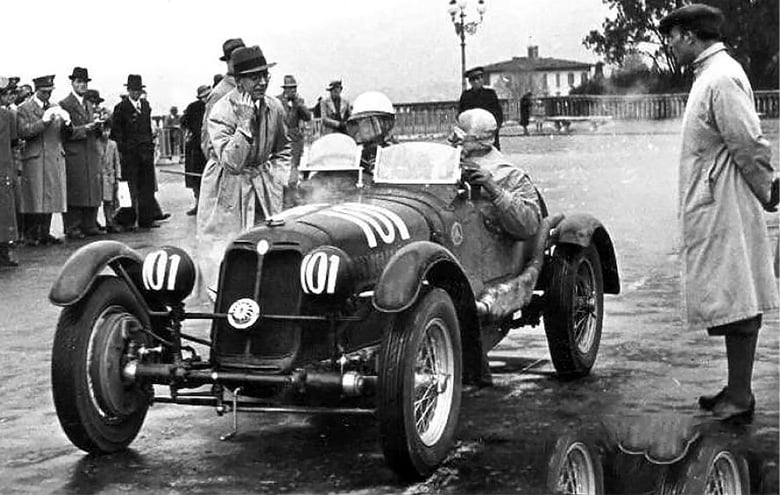
Their first season, a Maserati 4CS at the 1937 Mille Miglia, driven by Luigi Villoresi and Giovanni Lurani

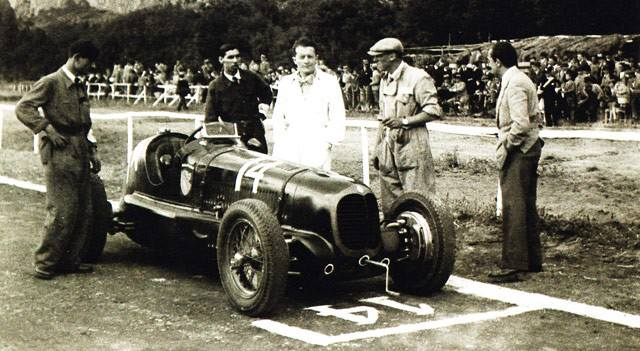
Maserati 6CM at the 1938 Targa Florio driven by Ferdinando Righetti

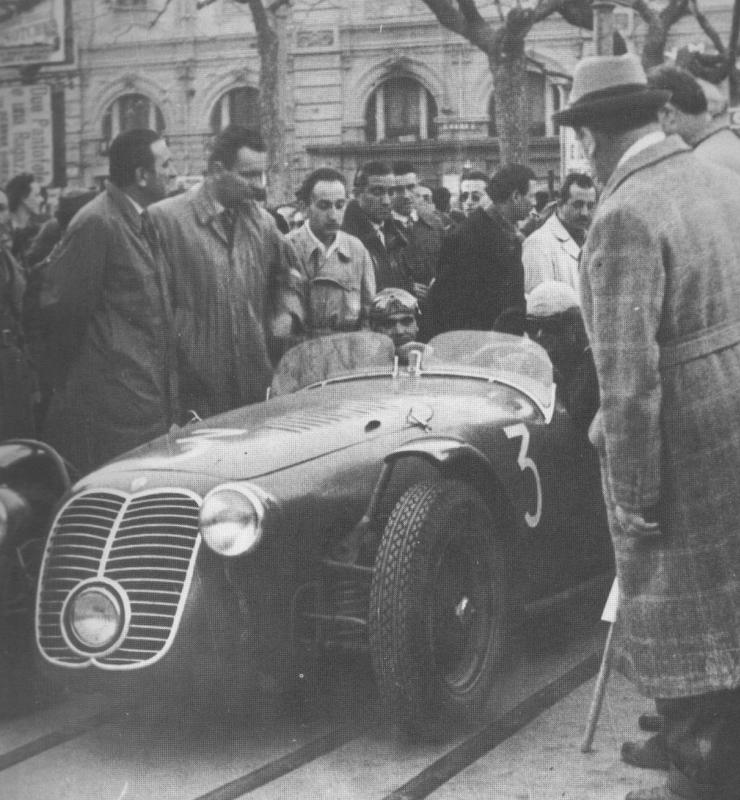
Maserati A6GCS at the 1948 Targa Florio, driven by Alberto Ascari

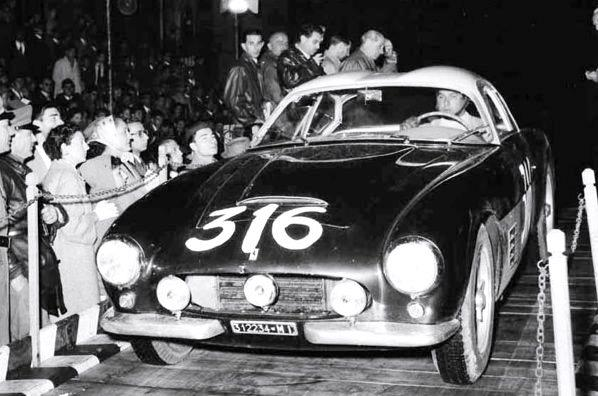
Ferrari 250 GT TdF at the 1957 Giro Sicilia driven by Albino Buttichi
