= Leslie Brooke =

British racing driver (1910–1967)

- Nationality: British
- Born: Henry Leslie Brooke; 12 September 1910 Rusholme, UK
- Died: 9 November 1967 (aged 57) Birmingham, UK

World Sportscar Championship
- Years active: 1955
- Teams: Triumph Motor Company
- Starts: 1
- Wins: 0
- Poles: 0

Previous series
- 1947–1954: Non-championship Formula One

24 Hours of Le Mans career
- Years: 1955
- Teams: Triumph Motor Company
- Best finish: 19th (1955) (7th in class)
- Class wins: 0

Henry Leslie Brooke, GM (12 September 1910 – 9 November 1967) was a British racing driver from England. He competed in various classes of racing, including non-championship Formula One, the Le Mans 24-hour race and the Monte Carlo Rally, in the 1930s, 1940s and 1950s.

== Racing career ==
=== Pre-World War II ===
Brooke began his career in 1937 with a self-built special based upon a Riley Imp chassis, with an 1,100 cc (67 cu in) MG engine. He entered several events that season but without much success. However, he continued to develop the car over the subsequent two seasons and in 1939, using a Riley 1,750 cc (107 cu in) straight-six engine, achieved three podium finishes at Brooklands, together with a second place at Shelsley Walsh and another second place in the International Trophy at Silverstone.

=== Post-war ===
Brooke's career was then interrupted by World War II. He resumed thereafter, initially with his special, but subsequently purchased an ERA B-type. With this car he won the Grand Prix des Frontières in 1946 and hillclimb events.

In 1947, Brooke finished second in the Swedish Winter Grand Prix in February, but retired from the Vallentuna F1 race held later the same month and from the Jersey F1 race held at Saint Helier. Brooke then purchased an ERA E-type which he used to compete in the Reims Grand Prix retiring after five laps after which he shared Fred Ashmore's ERA B-type which also retired after 33 laps. At the Grand Prix d'Albi, Brooke resumed with his own B-type but having qualified sixth, retired after 18 laps with an engine problem. At the Nice Grand Prix, he finished seventh with the B-type having qualified 20th, and last. He achieved the first-ever race finish (fourth) for the E-type in the 1947 British Empire Trophy at Douglas Circuit and at the 1947 French Grand Prix, qualified in eighth position with the same car but retired after only one lap with an engine problem. He later sold the car back to ERA.

In 1948, Brooke began the season with the B-type, retiring from the Jersey F1 race in April, but claiming third-place in the British Empire Trophy in May, followed by fourth place in the inaugural Zandvoort Grand Prix. He then moved to a Maserati 4CLT, entered by Scuderia Ambrosiana and finished 11th in the Grand Prix d'Albi and 11th in the 1948 Italian Grand Prix under his own name, but was forced to retire from the Monza Grand Prix and the Penya Rhin Grand Prix.

In 1949, Brooke finished seventh in the Grand Prix d'Albi with the Maserati, did not progress past the heats at the International Trophy and retired from the 1949 Italian Grand Prix.

Brooke retired from the 1950 San Remo Grand Prix after eight laps. He subsequently reduced his participation in circuit racing and began competing in rallying with a Triumph TR2. He also competed in the Monte Carlo Rally in 1955 when the Standard Motor Company entered several of their Eight and Ten models.

Brooke made an appearance at the 1954 Goodwood F1 race with a Connaught A-type-Lea Francis. However, having set fastest time in qualifying, he failed to start the race.

=== Career highlights ===
Season	Series/event	Position	Entrant	Car
1946	Grand Prix des Frontières	1st	Leslie Brooke	ERA B-type
1947	Swedish Winter Grand Prix	2nd	Leslie Brooke	ERA B-type
1948	British Empire Trophy	3rd	Leslie Brooke	ERA B-type

=== Complete Mille Miglia results ===
Year	Team	Co-drivers	Car	Class	Pos.	Class Pos.
1954		(United Kingdom) Jack Fairman	Triumph TR2	S2.0	94th	
1955		(United Kingdom) Frank Lampe	Triumph TR2	S2.0	59th	
1956		(United Kingdom) Stan Asbury	Austin-Healey 100	SP	DNF	

=== Complete 24 Hours of Le Mans results ===
Year	Team	Co-Drivers	Car	Class	Laps	Pos.	Class Pos.
1955	(United Kingdom) Standard Triumph	(United Kingdom) Mortimer Morris-Goodall	Triumph TR2	S2.0	214	19th	7th

== Personal life ==
Brooke was awarded the George Medal during World War II for bravery during the Coventry Blitz. He was also joint-principal of Coventry-based Speed Engines Limited, set up in the mid 1950s to build a British F1 engine. The project was short-lived though and only one example was produced.
