= Cuth Harrison =

British racing driver (1906–1981)

- Born: 6 July 1906; Ecclesall, Sheffield, West Riding of Yorkshire, England
- Died: 21 January 1981 (aged 74); Sheffield, South Yorkshire, England

Formula One World Championship career
- Nationality: (United Kingdom) British
- Active years: 1950
- Team: ERA
- Entries: 3
- Championships: 0
- Wins: 0
- Podiums: 0
- Career points: 0
- Pole positions: 0
- Fastest laps: 0
- First entry: 1950 British Grand Prix
- Last entry: 1950 Italian Grand Prix

Thomas Cuthbert Harrison (6 July 1906 – 21 January 1981) was a British racing driver from England. He was born in Ecclesall, Sheffield, and also died in Sheffield. He participated in three World Championship Formula One Grands Prix, debuting on 13 May 1950. He scored no championship points. He founded the T.C.Harrison Ford dealership.

== Complete Formula One World Championship results ==
(key)

Year	Entrant	Chassis	Engine	1	2	3	4	5	6	7	WDC	Points
1950	Cuth Harrison	ERA B Type	ERA Straight-6	GBR; 7	MON; Ret	500	SUI	BEL	FRA	ITA; Ret	NC	0
