= Reg Parnell =

British racing driver (1911–1964)

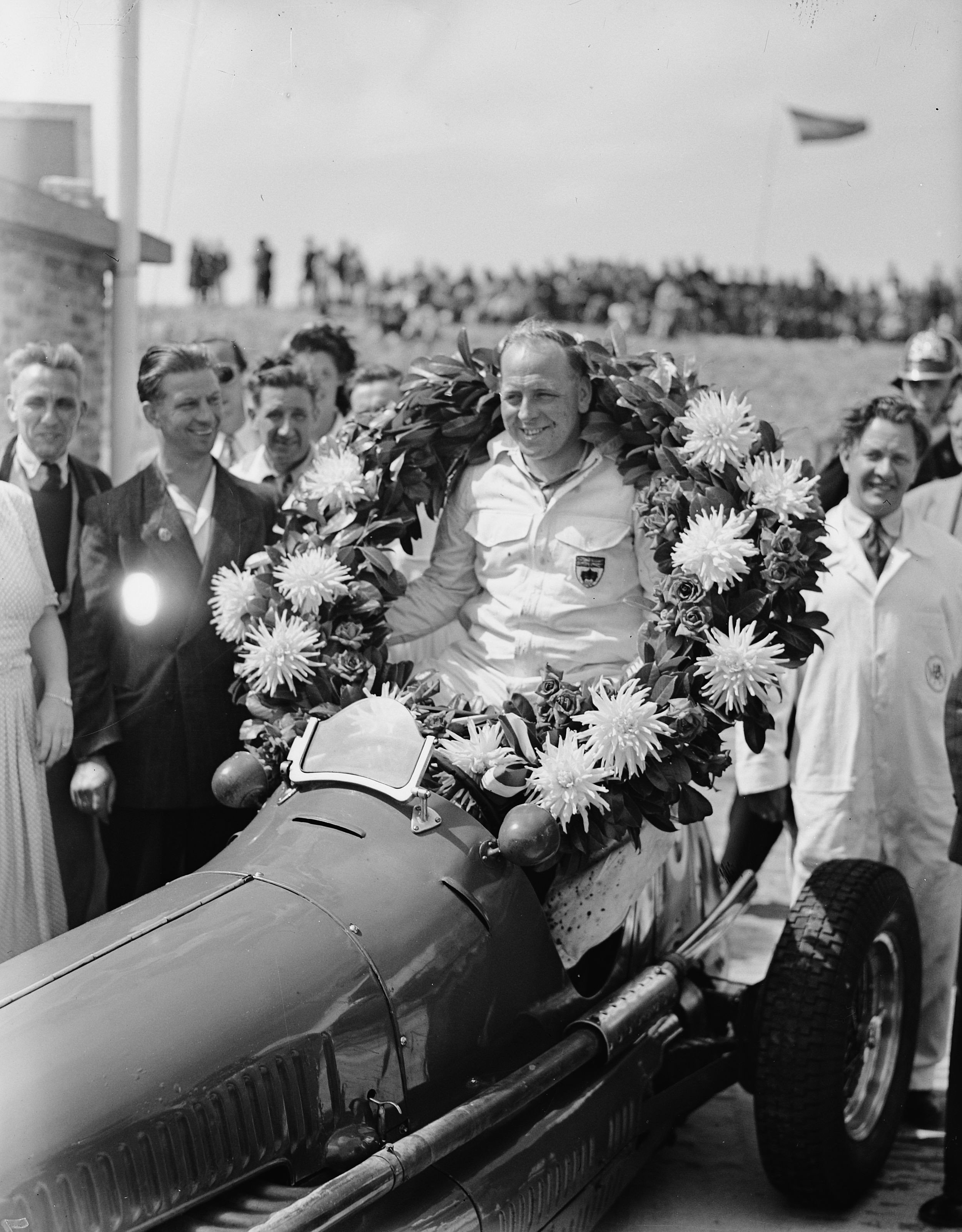
- Born: 2 July 1911; Derby, Derbyshire, England
- Died: 7 January 1964 (aged 52); Derby, Derbyshire, England

Formula One World Championship career
- Nationality: (United Kingdom) British
- Active years: 1950 – 1952, 1954
- Team(s): Alfa Romeo, BRM, non-works Ferrari, non-works Maserati, non-works Cooper
- Entries: 7 (6 starts)
- Championships: 0
- Wins: 0
- Podiums: 1
- Career points: 9
- Pole positions: 0
- Fastest laps: 0
- First entry: 1950 British Grand Prix
- Last entry: 1954 British Grand Prix

Reginald Parnell (2 July 1911 – 7 January 1964) was a racing driver and team manager from Derby, England. He participated in seven Formula One World Championship Grands Prix, achieving one podium, and scoring a total of nine championship points.

Parnell, as both a driver and a team manager, had a considerable influence on post-war British motorsport until his premature death in 1964. Parnell raced at Brooklands and was banned following an accident with Kay Petre which ended her racing career. Before the war he bought up racing cars. Once the hostilities had ceased he sold them to form the basis of post-war racing entries. He later raced a whole host of cars before turning to management and taking Aston Martin into Formula 1. Parnell went on to run the Yeoman Credit Racing team with the help of his son Tim who later raced in Formula 1 himself.

== Early career ==
Parnell came from a family which ran a garage business in Derby. In 1933, he was a spectator when Donington Park held its first motor race, and he decided to try the sport. By 1935, he bought an old 2-litre Bugatti single-seater for just £25. It broke its rear axle in the paddock at its first meeting, but buying spare parts for the Bugatti was too expensive, so it was replaced with a MG Magnette K3. Parnell had secured wins at both Brooklands and Donington Park, but in 1937 he lost his licence following a practice accident for the 500 Mile race, at Brooklands. He misjudged an overtaking move on Kay Petre, when he lost control of the MG, crashing into her Austin 7 from behind, causing it to roll. She crashed badly and was seriously injured. She never raced competitively again. Although she put the incident down to "bad luck", the RAC revoked Parnell's racing license for two years. This meant that he was unable to race.

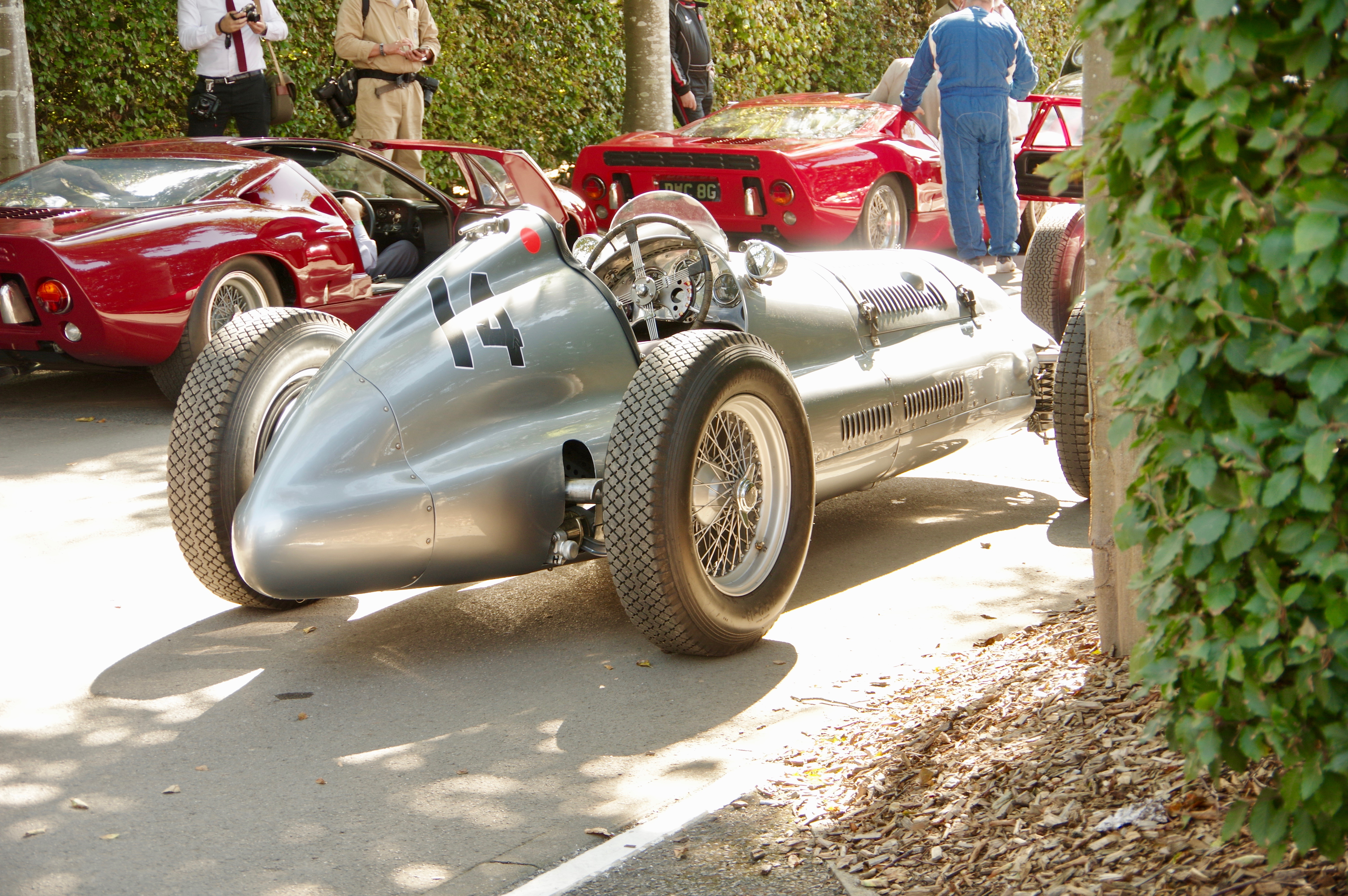
Parnell Challenger, Goodwood Revival, 2019

The ban meant in effect that, during 1938, Parnell found himself unable to race his cars, he soon discovered that lending the cars to other drivers was an excellent way of being involved in racing. His later abilities as a team manager were probably developed during this period. With his licence restored in 1939, Parnell was back with 4.9-litre Bugatti-engined single-seater, known as the BHW. He was particularly successful with this BHW at Donington Park. Meanwhile, he started to construct his own car for voiturette (the pre-war version of Formula Two), known as the Challenger, however with the outbreak of World War II, the best years of his career were wasted.

During the war years, Parnell finished the Challenger and built up a comprehensive collection of racing machinery, which included Alfa Romeo, ERA, Riley, Delage, MG and Maserati models. He also sold race cars, with many famous and less famous racing machines passing through his hands, whilst making a name for himself in the business. This did not prevent Parnell from driving as soon as the war ended.

== Post WWII ==
Parnell returned to racing as soon as he could in 1946 in a variety of machinery, most notably a Maserati 4CLT, then an ERA A-type alongside several Delages and Rileys. As for the Challenger, it was sold. This proved to be a poor year for mechanical reliability, although in his Maserati 4CLM, he did finish second behind Prince Bira in the Ulster Trophy, around the streets of Dundrod. There was only one motor racing event held on English soil in 1946, and this took place at Gransden Lodge, with Parnell winning the main race of the event, the Gransden Lodge Trophy.

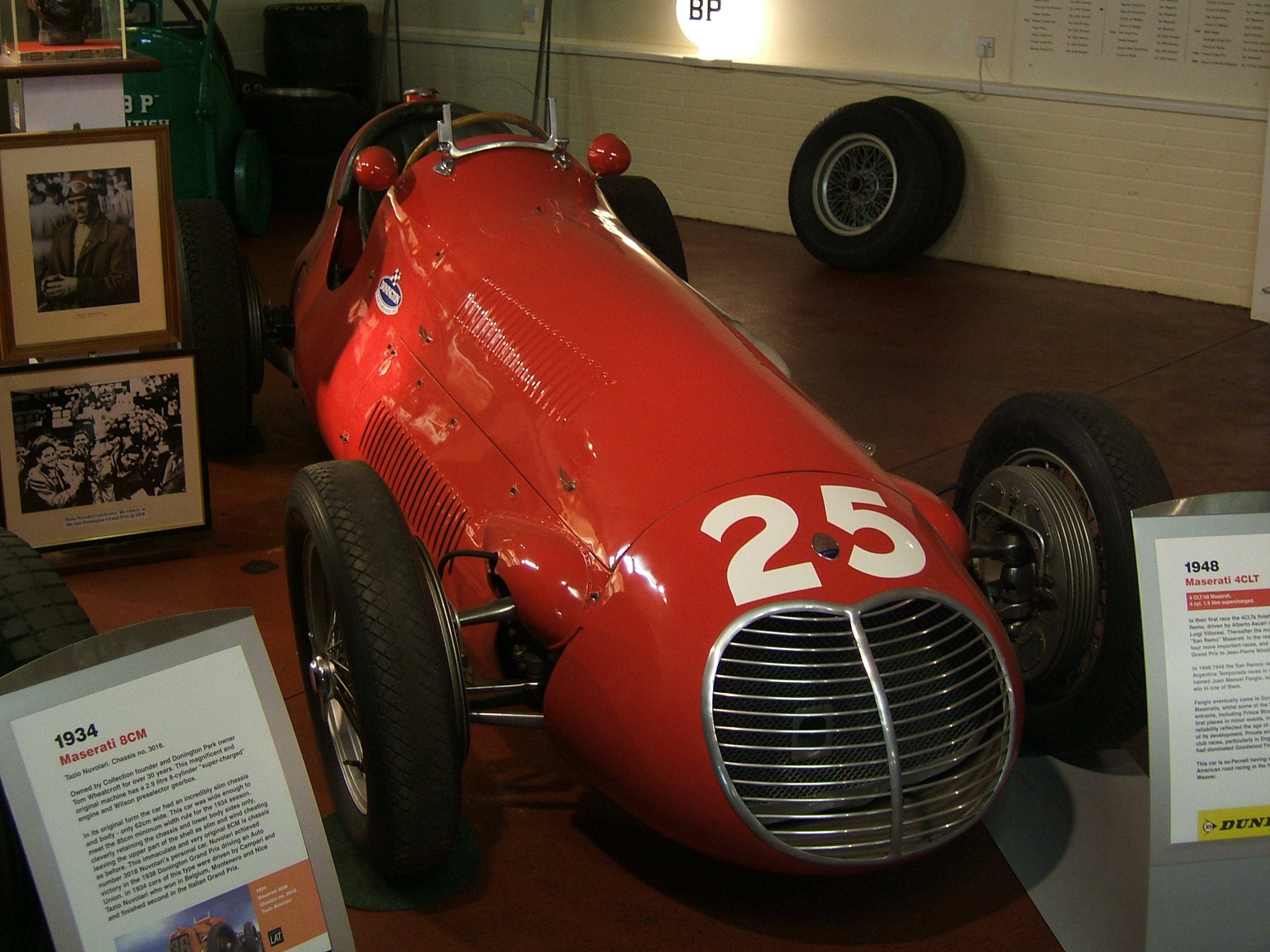
An ex-Reg Parnell Maserati 4CLT "San Remo", in the Donington Collection museum, Leicestershire, England.

In 1947, Parnell was Britain's most successful racing driver, for which he won the BRDC's Gold Star. He began the year by winning two ice races in Sweden, with his ERA A-type, the earlier of these being the first Formula 1 race. He then returned to Britain, to win the Jersey Road Race in the Maserati 4CLT. He would have also won in Ulster, had his recently acquired ERA E-type not broken a de Dion tube. The following year, Parnell would again win the Gold Star. He took his new Maserati 4CLT/48 to Zandvoort and finished third in the circuit's inaugural meeting. He won the Goodwood Trophy at the first-ever meeting at Sussex circuit, was second in the Penya Rhin Grand Prix and fifth in the Gran Premio d'Italia. Parnell maintained this success into 1949 with the Maserati, gaining many successes at Goodwood, earning him the nickname, "Emperor of Goodwood", and raced at almost every major circuit across Europe. He also competed in the early-season races in South America.

It was in Sweden that Parnell showed true British ingenuity. He was there for the 1947 Swedish Winter Grand Prix at Rommehed, the first race run for cars complying with the newly-introduced Formula 1. He duly won, thus becoming the first winner of a Formula 1 race. He led an ERA clean sweep of the podium, as the only three cars to finish. Their chief rivals – the French – were stranded miles away from the circuit, on a ship stuck fast in the ice. The organiser decided to rerun the event as the Stockholm Grand Prix, on Lake Vallentuna. Meanwhile, between the two races Parnell had the idea of fitting twin rear wheels to his ERA to improve its road-holding on the ice. When he arrived at the race, the lead French driver, Raymond Sommer immediately objected but Parnell had checked the rules beforehand and found that there was nothing to preclude twin rear wheels. Despite temperatures of −15°F, Parnell's extra wheels really made the difference, as he skated to victory.

== Formula One ==
The following season, Parnell was asked to drive the fourth works Alfa Romeo, in the inaugural World Championship Formula One race at Silverstone. He finished in third place, achieving a place on the podium, together with his teammates Giuseppe Farina and Luigi Fagioli. He would be the only British driver to be selected to race with the all-conquering factory.

Whilst racing his Maserati, under the Scuderia Ambrosiana banner, he then became involved with BRM, initially as a test driver of the original V16 and later as the team's lead driver of the BRM Type 15, although BRM did not make many appearances. He remained under contract to BRM for 1951, but raced his Maserati because BRM could never get him a car, first with a win in the Chichester Cup at Goodwood, then having to retire in the Gran Premio di San Remo. When the BRM did work, it was at Goodwood that the car had its first victories when Parnell won the Woodcote Cup, then the Goodwood Trophy later the same day.

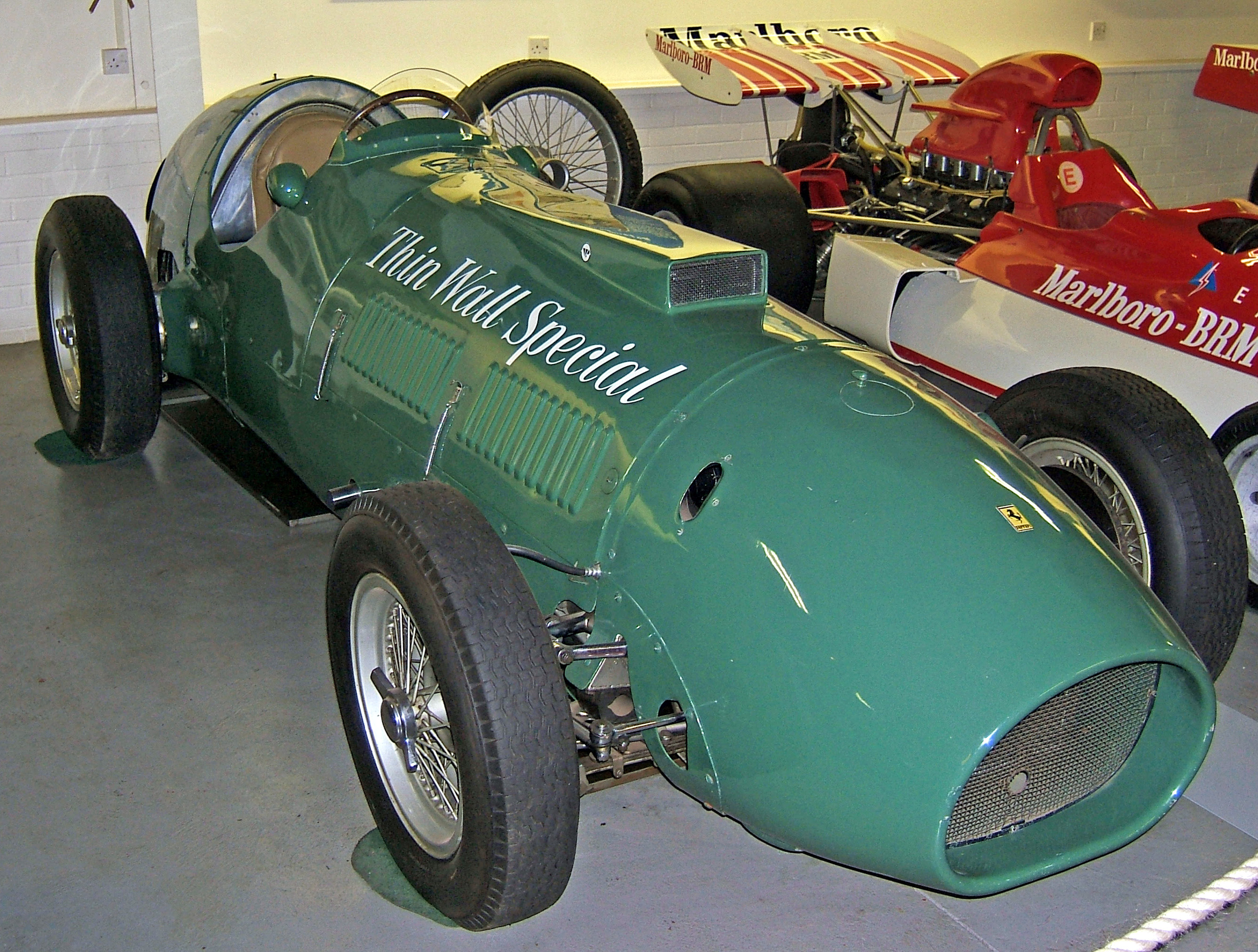
Tony Vandervell's modified Ferrari 375, used by Parnell between 1952 and 1954, in the Donington Collection museum, Leicestershire, England.

After the trip in Italy, Tony Vandervell approached him which saw Parnell driving Vandervell's Thinwall Special (a highly modified Formula One Ferrari 375) in numerous F1 races. He left a star-studded field standing in conditions so bad that the BRDC International Trophy final raced through hail, lightning and heavy rain. With poor visibility and the track under as much as six inches of water, the race had to be stopped after six laps due to Silverstone being flooded and too dangerous to continue. When the race was abandoned, Parnell was in the lead; no official winner was declared, so although he defeated the Alfa Romeo team, it was not until two months later in the 1951 British Grand Prix that the Alfas suffered their first real defeat. After the race Reg said, "It's a pity it was stopped as I would have liked the race to have continued. I was a minute ahead of the Italians and I am sure they would not have made this up. It was like aquaplaning in an ice-cold tub, but in the cockpit it was very hot and steamy so that at 80mph I only had a dim outline of the comers and only the outlines of spray telling me that another car was in front."

Vandervell immediately entered Parnell for the Festival of Britain Trophy at Goodwood, just a few weeks later. Parnell won the first heat, breaking the outright lap record on his first lap, from a standing start, from Farina and his 4CLT. He would go on and win the final, after a tremendous battle with Farina.

Parnell was back in the 4CLT at Dundrod for the Ulster Trophy. Following his defeat at Goodwood, Farina arrived with a works Alfa Romeo 158. At the start, the Italian had the better start and took the lead with Parnell running second. This was a tactical move, as the Farina knew that he would have to stop for fuel, whereas Parnell could run the race without stopping. As Farina exited the pits, Parnell shot past into the lead, but just one lap later, the Farina ate up Parnell's 3-second lead, passed him and won the race with Parnell taking second.

At the Grand Prix de l'A.C.F., BRM announced they would race at Reims-Gueux with Parnell, so Vandervell offered the Thinwall Special to Brian Shawe-Taylor. However, as the BRM failed to show up, and Shawe-Taylor was clearly at the same level as Parnell, Vandervell offered the Thinwall to Parnell, who finished fourth. After finishing second at Goodwood, he ended his season by taking the Scottish Grand Prix, at Winfield.

June 1952, over 25,000 spectators squeezed into Boreham to see Parnell take his only Formula Two victory aboard a Cooper –Bristol T20.

== Sportscars ==
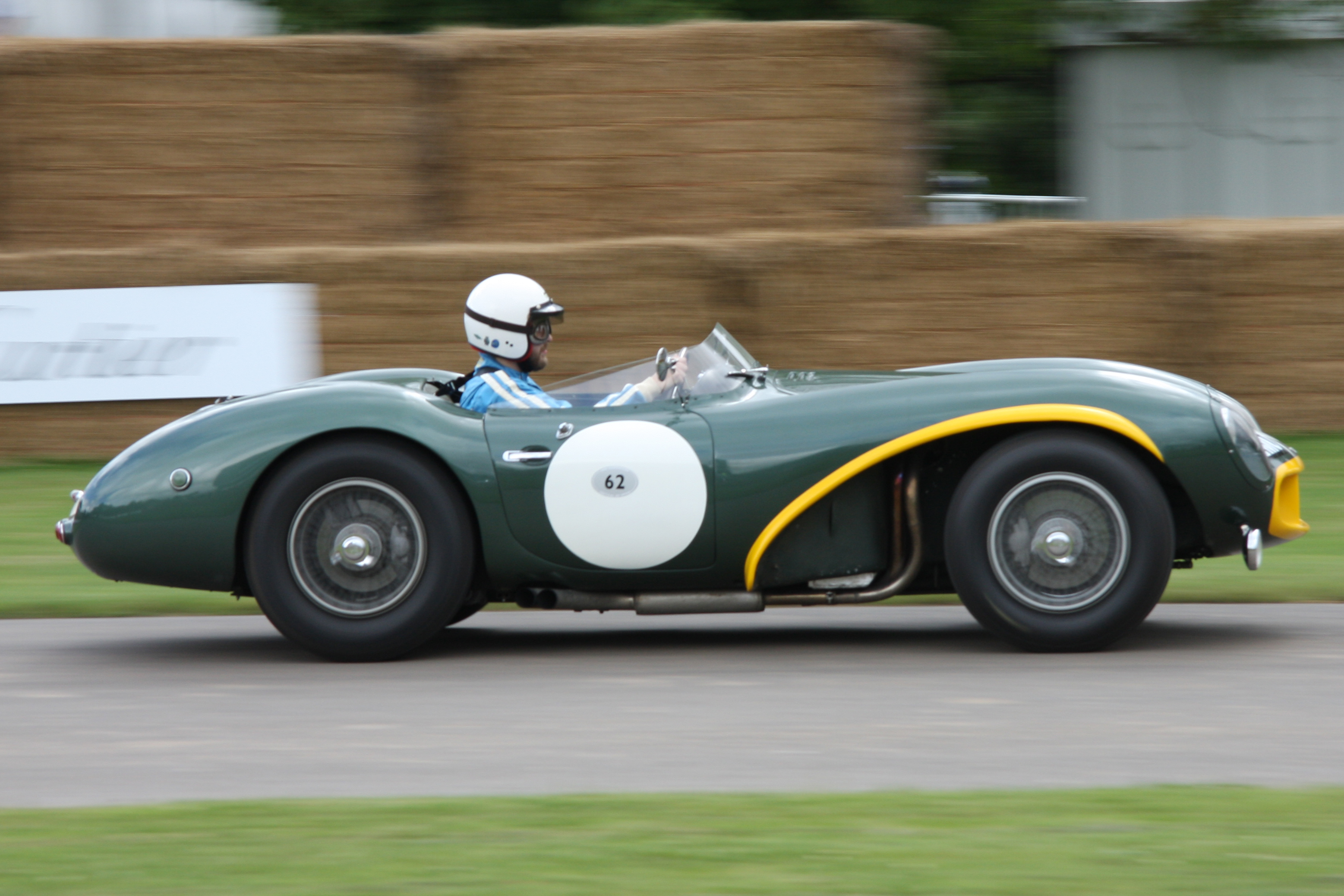
an Aston Martin DB3S, similar to the model, Parnell took numerous race wins, on the Goodwood Hill.

Following his success into the 1950 RAC British Grand Prix, Parnell was signed by Aston Martin, taking a DB2 to sixth place in to 24 Heures du Mans, partnered by Charles Brackenbury (second in class). He followed this up with a class win (fourth overall) in the RAC Tourist Trophy, held around the narrow lanes of Dundrod.

In 1952, Parnell enjoyed more class success with the DB2, taking wins at Silverstone and Boreham; at Goodwood, he unhesitatingly assumed duties as team manager for Aston Martin, following a pit fire seriously injured John Wyer. This was a foretaste of things to come. The success continued into 1953. At that year's Mille Miglia despite driving on the ignition switch after a broken throttle had to be wired up fully open, he and navigator, Louis Klemantaski finished in fifth place in their DB3. This was the highest ever finish by a British car at the great Italian classic. This result followed his second place in the 12 Hours of Sebring. He was also second at the RAC Tourist Trophy, and victorious in the Goodwood Nine Hours.

== Later years ==
In 1954, in addition to his commitments for Aston Martin, Parnell continued to drive his own Ferrari 625 in numerous Formula One events, winning at Goodwood, Snetterton and Crystal Palace. The following season, he secured more victories for Aston Martin, before an unsuccessful sortie to New Zealand with an experimental single-seater Aston Martin. During 1956 Whit Monday at Crystal Palace, Parnell crashed Rob Walker's Connaught B-type, suffering a broken collar-bone and a badly cut knee. He recovered from this and returned to New Zealand, with the Scudeia Ambrosiana entered Ferrari 555/860, winning both the New Zealand Grand Prix and the Dunedin Trophy, early 1957.

Parnell was successful in other formulae, but at the end of 1957, he decided to retire at the age of just 45. His last international race was the New Zealand Championship Road Race, at Ryal Bush where he finished second in a Ferrari 555/860.

== Team management ==
Parnell became the team manager of Aston Martin, a move which led him to oversee a famous 1–2 in 1959 24 Hours of Le Mans, when Roy Salvadori and Carroll Shelby led home Maurice Trintignant and Paul Frère. The company then decided to enter Formula One and Parnell led the team but at the end of 1960 the programme was abandoned.

In 1961, the Samengo-Turner brothers (Paul, William & Fabian) asked Parnell to take over the management of the Yeoman Credit Racing Team sponsorship deal from Ken Gregory of the British Racing Partnership. During the 1961 Formula One season, he ran two Cooper T53 Low-Line–Climax cars for John Surtees and Roy Salvadori, who between them collected a handful of championship points. For the 1962 season the team was renamed Bowmaker-Yeoman Racing, and in place of the Coopers, ran Lola Mk4 chassis, again powered by Climax engines. Surtees and Salvadori remained with the team, but Salvadori had a nightmare season, failing to finish a single race. Surtees fared much better, however, scoring 19 points and finishing in fourth place in the Drivers' Championship. During the season he also gave Parnell his first podium finishes as manager – with second places in both the British and German events – and took pole position at the season-opening Dutch Grand Prix.

After the Bowmakers withdrew from F1 at the end of 1962, Parnell set up a team in his own name. Reg Parnell Racing was still in the early stages of development in its premises in Hounslow, running a car of the young driver, Chris Amon.

Dr. Bartrip wrote that Parnell "could prepare a car meticulously and was as astute judge of a driver, identifying the potential of such talented prospects as John Surtees, Chris Amon, and Mike Hailwood".

== Death ==
For the 1964 season, Parnell had commissioned a design for a new car, when he died from peritonitis at age 52 from complications after an appendix operation. Parnell's son Tim, also a racing driver, took over the team management and developed a strong working relationship with BRM during the late 1960s.

== Racing record ==
=== Career highlights ===
Season	Series	Position	Team	Car
1946	Gransden Lodge Trophy	1st		Maserati 4CL
	Ulster Trophy	2nd		Maserati 4CL
1947	Swedish Winter Grand Prix	1st		ERA A-Type
	Stockholm Grand Prix	1st		ERA A-Type
	Jersey Road Race	1st		Maserati 4CL
	Nîmes Grand Prix	3rd		Maserati 4CL
	Nice Grand Prix	3rd		Maserati 4CL
1948	Goodwood Trophy	1st		Maserati 4CLT/48
	Gran Premio de Penya Rhin	2nd		Maserati 4CLT/48
	Jersey Road Race	3rd		Maserati 4CL
	Grand Prix de Zandvoort	3rd		Maserati 4CLT
1949	Richmond Trophy	1st		Maserati 4CLT/48
	Chichester Cup	1st		Maserati 4CLT
	Woodcote Cup	1st		Maserati 4CLT
	Goodwood Trophy	1st		Maserati 4CLT/48
	Goodwood International	2nd		Maserati 4CLT
	Copa de Acción San Lorenzo	2nd	Scuderia Ambrosiana	Maserati 4CLT
1950	Richmond Trophy	1st		Maserati 4CLT/48
	Woodcote Cup	1st	Owen Racing Organisation	BRM Type 15
	Goodwood Trophy	1st	Owen Racing Organisation	BRM Type 15
	Jersey Road Race	2nd		Maserati 4CLT
	Nottingham Trophy	2nd		Maserati 4CLT
	RAC British Grand Prix	3rd	Alfa Romeo SpA	Alfa Romeo 158
	FIA World Championship of Drivers	9th	Alfa Romeo SpA; Scuderia Ambrosiana	Alfa Romeo 158; Maserati 4CLT/48
1951	Chichester Cup	1st		Maserati 4CLT/48
	Festival of Britain Trophy	1st	GA Vandervell	Ferrari 375 Thinwall Special
	BRDC International Trophy	1st	GA Vandervell	Ferrari 375 Thinwall Special
	Castletown Trophy	1st		Maserati 4CLT/48
	Scottish Grand Prix	1st	GA Vandervell	Ferrari 375 Thinwall Special
	Ulster Trophy	2nd	GA Vandervell	Ferrari 375 Thinwall Special
	Woodcote Cup	2nd	GA Vandervell	Ferrari 375 Thinwall Special
	Goodwood Trophy	2nd	GA Vandervell	Ferrari 375 Thinwall Special
	FIA World Championship of Drivers	10th	GA Vandervell; Owen Racing Organisation	Ferrari 375 Thinwall Special; BRM Type 15
1952	West Essex CC Formula 2 Race	1st	Archie Bryde	Cooper-Bristol T20
	Silverstone International	2nd	David Brown	Aston Martin DB2
	Daily Graphic Trophy	2nd	Owen Racing Organisation	BRM Type 15
	Boreham International	3rd		Maserati 4CLT
	Woodcote Cup	3rd	Owen Racing Organisation	BRM Type 15
1953	British Empire Trophy	1st	Aston Martin	Aston Martin DB3S
	Charterhall International	1st	Aston Martin Ltd.	Aston Martin DB3S
	Goodwood Nine Hours	1st	David Brown	Aston Martin DB3S
	Grand Prix, 12 Hours of Sebring	2nd	Aston Martin Ltd.	Aston Martin DB3
	RAC Tourist Trophy	2nd	Aston Martin Ltd.	Aston Martin DB3S
	Silverstone International	3rd	Aston Martin Ltd.	Aston Martin DB3
1954	Lavant Cup	1st	Scuderia Ambrosiana	Ferrari 500
	Whitsun Trophy	1st	Scuderia Ambrosiana	Ferrari 500
	Crystal Palace Trophy	1st	Scuderia Ambrosiana	Ferrari 500
	August Bank Holiday Cup	1st	Scuderia Ambrosiana	Ferrari 500
	RedeX Trophy	1st	Scuderia Ambrosiana	Ferrari 500
	International Gold Cup	2nd	Scuderia Ambrosiana	Ferrari 500
	Daily Telegraph 200	2nd	Scuderia Ambrosiana	Ferrari 500
	Aintree International	3rd	Aston Martin	Aston Martin DB3S
1955	Silverstone International	1st	Aston Martin	Aston Martin DB3S
	Charterhall International	1st		Aston Martin DB3S
	Oulton Park International	1st	Aston Martin	Aston Martin DB3S
	British Empire Trophy	3rd	Aston Martin	Aston Martin DB3S
	Goodwood International	3rd	Eq. Endeavour	Cooper-Connaught T39
1956	Southland Road Race	1st		Aston Martin DB3S
	New Zealand Championship Road Race	2nd		Aston Martin DB3S
	Production Car Grand Prix de Spa-Francorchamps	2nd	Aston Martin	Aston Martin DB3S
1957	New Zealand Grand Prix	1st	Scuderia Ambrosiana	Ferrari 555/860
	Dunedin Road Race	1st	Scuderia Ambrosiana	Ferrari 555/860
	New Zealand Championship Road Race	2nd	Scuderia Ambrosiana	Ferrari 555/860

=== Complete Formula One World Championship results ===
(key)

Year	Entrant	Chassis	Engine	1	2	3	4	5	6	7	8	9	WDC	Points
1950	Alfa Romeo SpA	Alfa Romeo 158	Alfa Romeo Straight-8	GBR; 3	MON	500							9th	4
1950	Scuderia Ambrosiana	Maserati 4CLT/48	Maserati Straight-4				SUI; DNA	BEL	FRA; Ret	ITA; DNA			9th	4
1951	G.A. Vandervell	Ferrari 375 Thinwall	Ferrari V12	SUI	500	BEL; DNA	FRA; 4						10th	5
1951	BRM Ltd.	BRM P15	BRM V16					GBR; 5	GER	ITA; DNS	ESP; DNA		10th	5
1952	A.H.M. Bryde	Cooper T20	Bristol Straight-6	SUI	500	BEL	FRA	GBR; 7	GER	NED	ITA		NC	0
1954	Scuderia Ambrosiana	Ferrari 500/625	Ferrari Straight-4	ARG	500	BEL	FRA	GBR; Ret	GER	SUI	ITA	ESP	NC	0

=== Complete 24 Hours of Le Mans results ===
Year	Team	Co-Drivers	Car	Class	Laps	Pos.	Class Pos.
1950	(United Kingdom) Aston Martin Ltd.	(United Kingdom) Charles Brackenbury	Aston Martin DB2	S3.0	244	6th	2nd
1951	(United Kingdom) Aston Martin Ltd.	(United Kingdom) David Hampshire	Aston Martin DB2	S3.0	208	7th	3rd
1952	(United Kingdom) Aston Martin Ltd.	(United Kingdom) Eric Thompson	Aston Martin DB3	S3.0		DNF (Transmission)	
1953	(United Kingdom) Aston Martin Ltd.	(United Kingdom) Peter Collins	Aston Martin DB3S	S3.0	16	DNF (Accident)	
1954	(United Kingdom) David Brown	(United Kingdom) Roy Salvadori	Aston Martin DB3S	S5.0	222	DNF (Head gasket)	
1955	(United Kingdom) Aston Martin Lagonda Ltd.	(United Kingdom) Dennis Poore	Lagonda DP166	S5.0	93	DNF (Out of fuel)	
1956	(United Kingdom) David Brown	(United Kingdom) Tony Brooks	Aston Martin DBR1	S3.0	246	DNF (Gearbox)	

=== Complete 12 Hours of Sebring results ===
Year	Team	Co-Drivers	Car	Class	Laps	Pos.	Class Pos.
1953	(United Kingdom) Aston Martin, Ltd.	(United Kingdom) George Abecassis	Aston Martin DB3	S3.0	172	2nd	1st
1954	(United Kingdom) Aston Martin Ltd.	(United Kingdom) Roy Salvadori	Aston Martin DB3S	S3.0	24	DNF (Engine)	
1956	(United Kingdom) David Brown & Sons, Ltd.	(United Kingdom) Tony Brooks	Aston Martin DB3S	S3.0	169	DNF (Engine)	

=== Complete Mille Miglia results ===
Year	Team	Co-Drivers	Car	Class	Pos.	Class Pos.
1953	(United Kingdom) Aston Martin Lagonda	(United Kingdom) Louis Klemantaski	Aston Martin DB3	S+2.0	5th	5th
1954	(United Kingdom) David Brown	(United Kingdom) Louis Klemantaski	Aston Martin DB3S	S+2.0	DNF (Accident)	

Sporting positions
Preceded by Giuseppe Farina	BRDC International Trophy; Winner; 1951	Succeeded by Lance Macklin
Records
Preceded by Inaugural	Youngest driver to score a podium position in Formula One; 38 years, 315 days (1950 British Grand Prix)	Succeeded by Alberto Ascari; 31 years, 312 days (1950 Monaco GP)
Preceded by Inaugural	Youngest driver to score points in Formula One; 38 years, 315 days (1950 British Grand Prix)	Succeeded by Alberto Ascari; 31 years, 312 days (1950 Monaco GP)
