= English Racing Automobiles =

Automobile manufacturer

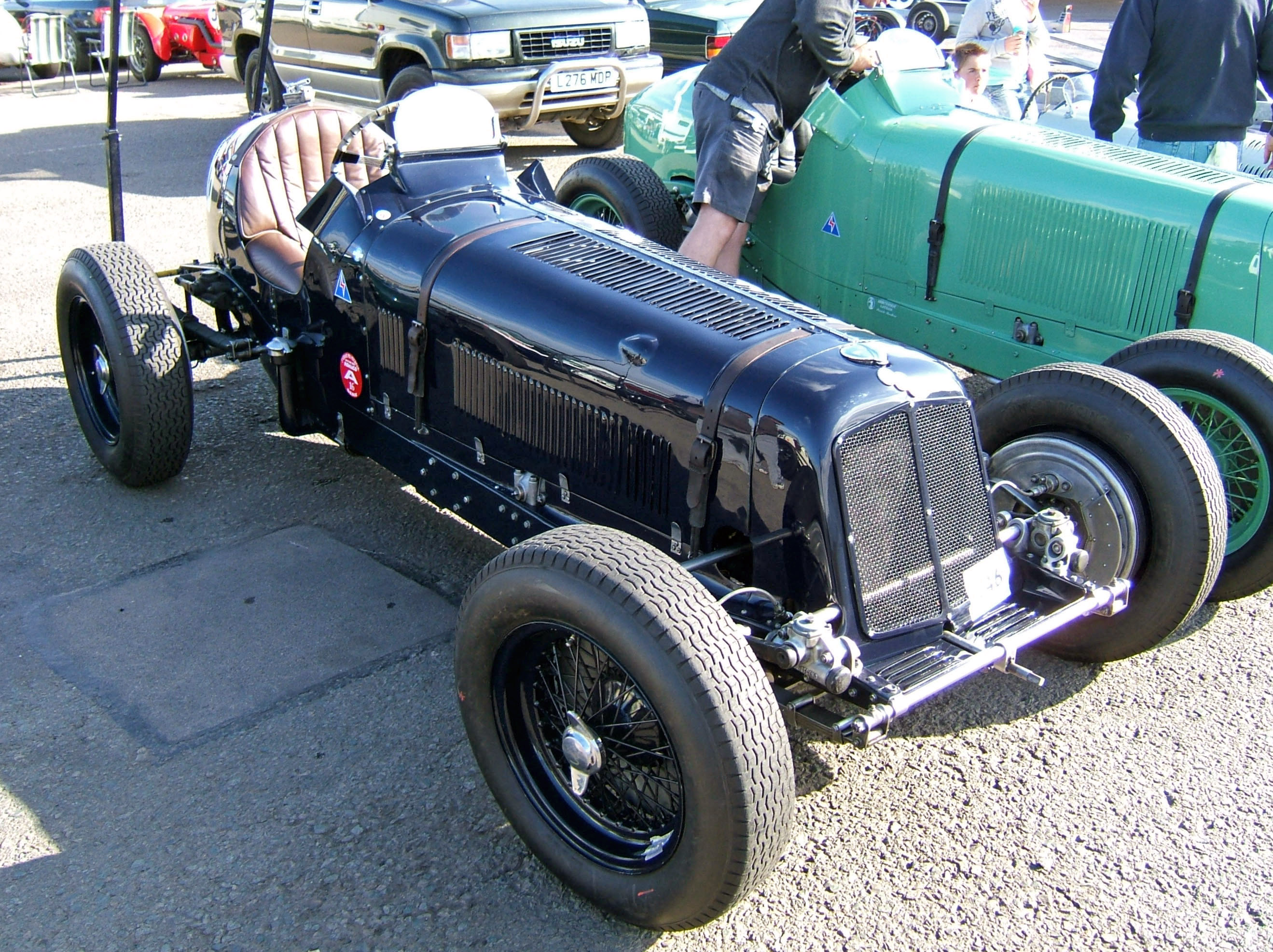
1936 1.5-litre ERA R6B, ex-Dudley "Doc" Benjafield

English Racing Automobiles (ERA) was a British racing car manufacturer active from 1933 to 1954.

== Prewar history ==
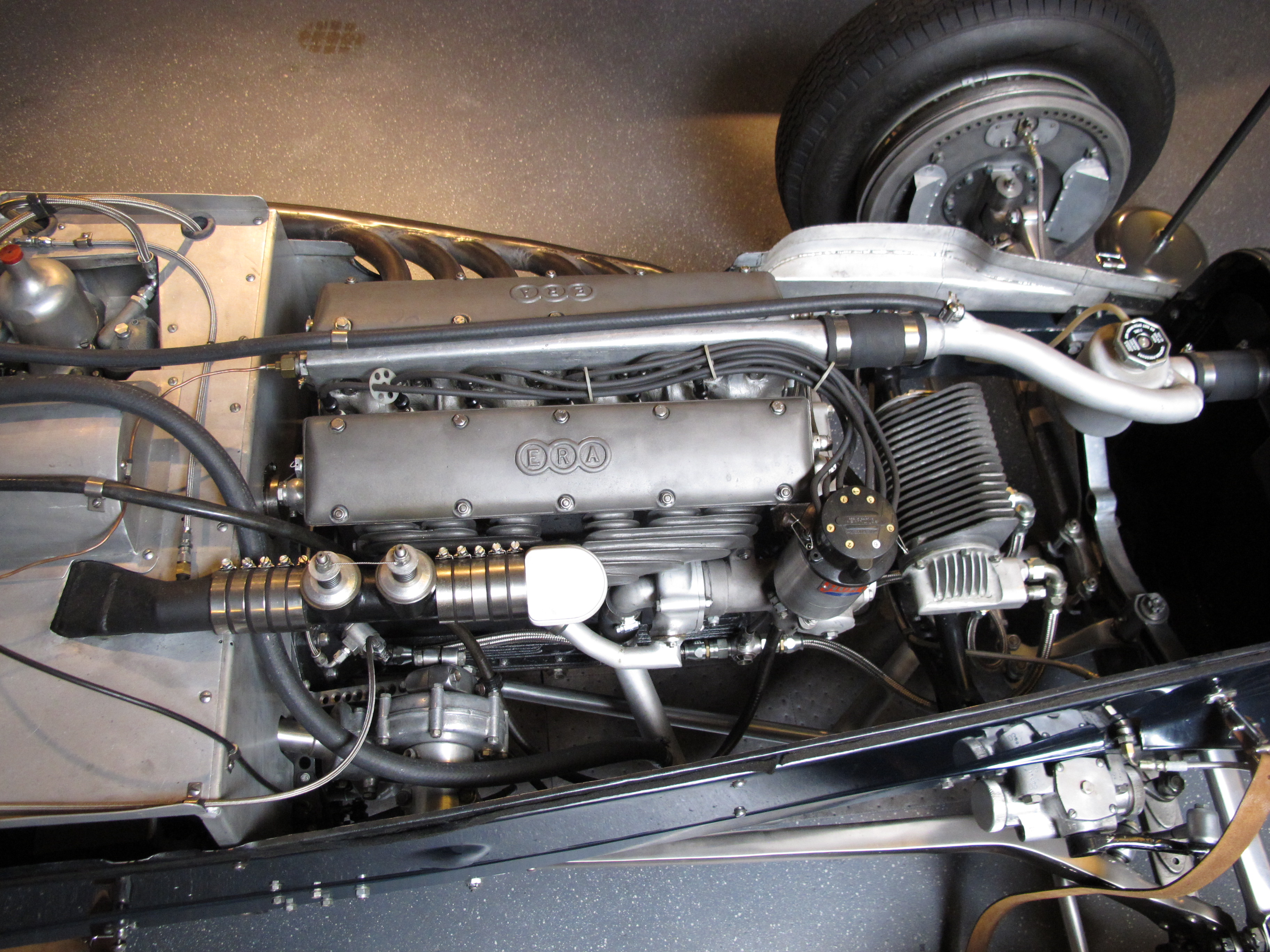
A six-cylinder supercharged ERA engine in Prince Bira's racing car

ERA was founded by Humphrey Cook, Raymond Mays, and Peter Berthon in November 1933 and established in Bourne, Lincolnshire, next to Eastgate House, the family home of Raymond Mays between Eastgate and Spalding Road. Their ambition was to manufacture and campaign a team of single seater racing cars capable of upholding British prestige in Continental European racing.

With the cost of full Grand Prix racing prohibitive, they instead aimed ERA's efforts at the smaller voiturette—1500cc supercharged—class of motor racing, the Formula 2 equivalent of the day. Humphrey Cook financed the operation—using the wealth from the family drapery business, Cook, Son & Co., of St Paul's Churchyard, London. Berthon was responsible for the overall design of the cars, while Mays became its principal driver—having already successfully raced several other makes including Vauxhall, Bugatti and Riley. A new chassis was conceived by British designer Reid Railton (who had also successfully designed the Bluebird land speed record cars for Malcolm Campbell) and was constructed by Thomson & Taylor at Brooklands. The engine was based on the well-proven Riley six-cylinder unit, albeit this was modified in a number of significant ways. A stronger forged crankshaft with a large centre Hyatt roller bearing was made and an entirely new aluminium cylinder head designed. The engine was supercharged using a bespoke supercharger designed by Murray Jamieson who had worked with Mays and Berthon on the White Riley. The ERA engine was designed around three capacities— a base 1488cc for the 1500cc racing class, one of 1088cc for the 1100cc class and also was capable of being expanded up to 1980cc for the 2000cc class. It ran on methanol and in its 1500cc form was capable of producing around 180–200 bhp and in excess of 250–275 bhp in 2000cc form.

The panel-beating brothers George and Jack Gray hand-fashioned the new car’s single-seater bodywork, to a design credited to a Mr Piercy who had previously designed the bodywork for Campbell’s '‘Bluebird’' record breaker.

=== A-Type ===
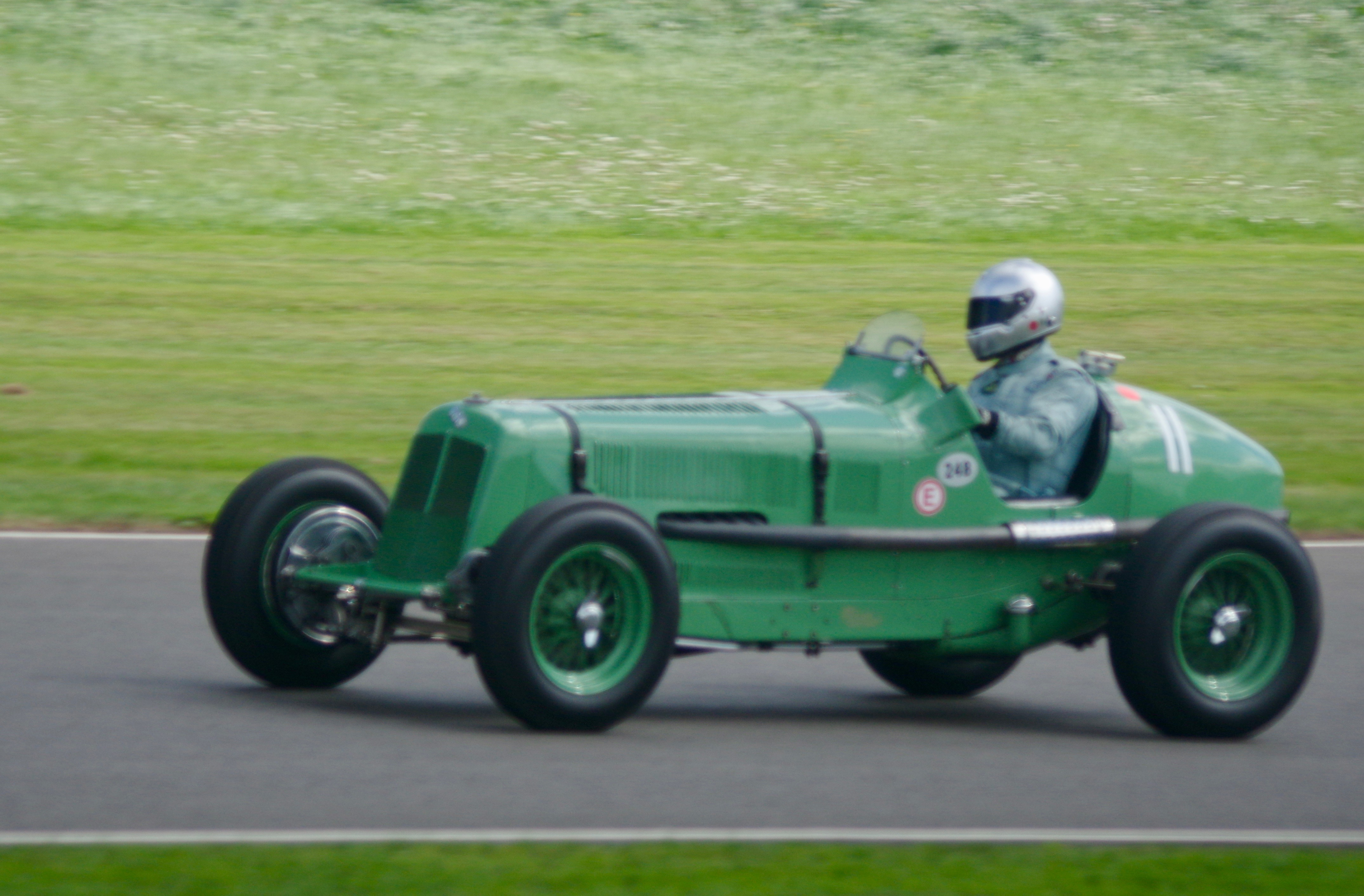
1934 ERA A-Type R3A

The unveiling of the first ERA—chassis R1A—to the press and public took place at Brooklands on 22 May 1934 following testing at Syston Park. After initial chassis handling problems, which required a number of modifications, soon ERA had a winning formula. By the end of the year ERAs had scored notable victories against many more established marques. In 1935, in a major race at the Nürburgring, ERAs took first, third, fourth and fifth places. The car was available in engine sizes running from 1.1 to 2.0 Litres. Four were built, two with 1.1-litre supercharged engines, one 1.5- and one 2-litre.

Through the remainder of the decade, with drivers of the calibre of Dick Seaman in the team, ERA dominated voiturette racing.

=== B-Type ===
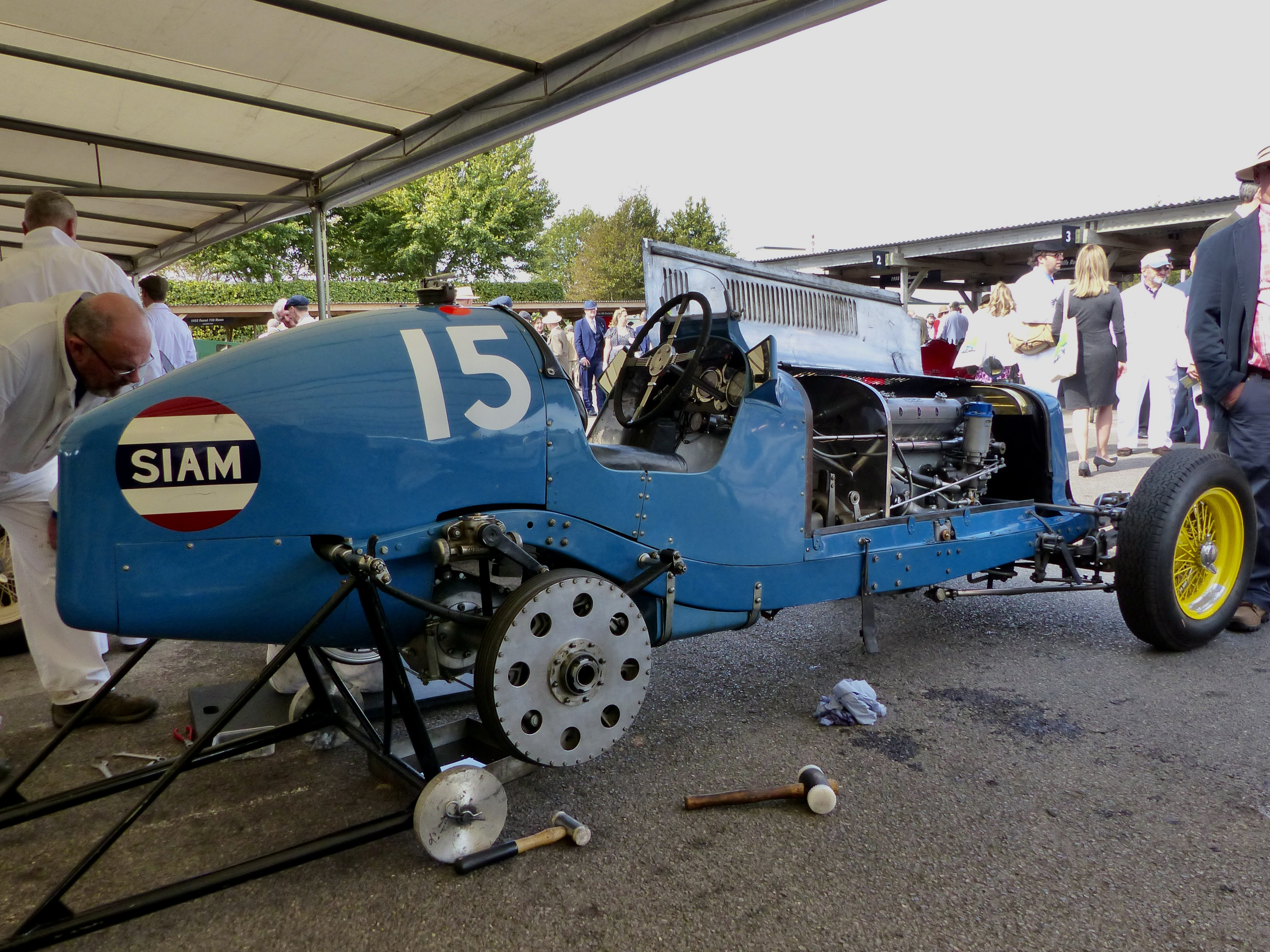
ERA R5B Remus, Goodwood Revival 2015

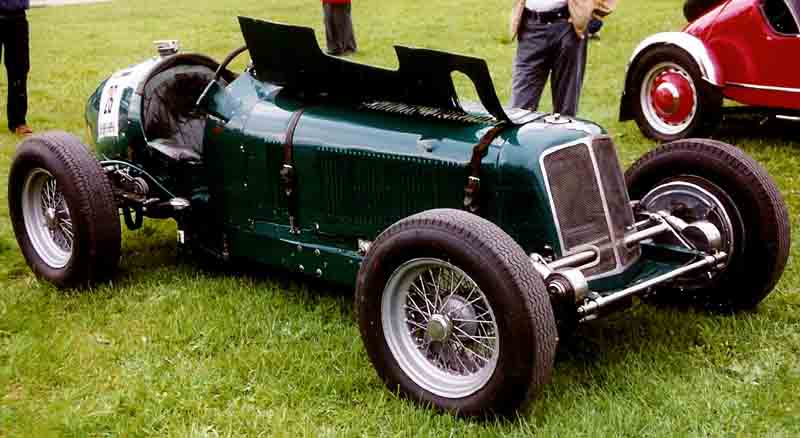
1937 ERA 2-Litre R14B

In 1935, production of the B-Type began (minimally changed). The A and B models were offered with three engine sizes.

Two Siamese princes, Chula Chakrabongse and Bira Birabongse, whose trio of ERAs became famous as "Hanuman", "Romulus" and "Remus", ran their own team, operating from The White Mouse Garage, Hammersmith. Prince Chula owned the team, having bought Romulus as a present for his cousin, Prince Bira, who was the team's driver.

13 B-Type ERAs were produced, three of which were later modified to subsequent (type C or in one case type D) specifications.

=== C-Type ===
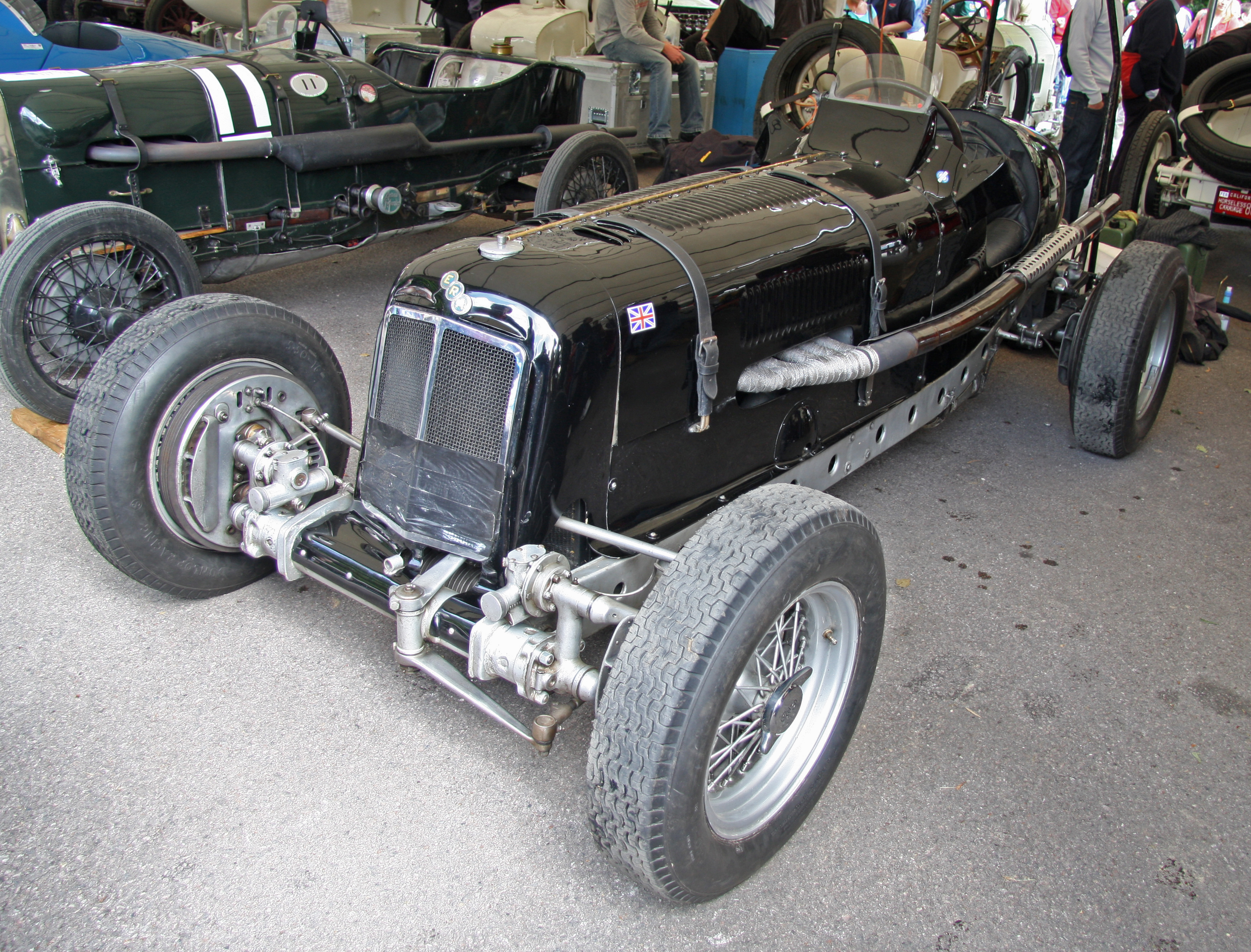
1935 ERA D-Type R4D

1937 saw the emergence of the C-Type. The same ladder-frame chassis and aluminum panel bodywork were kept on from the A and B models. However, the C model had a slightly different range of engines. None of the C stage cars had the smallest engine option, having instead 1.5 or 2.0 liter, with an added 1.75 liter intermediate engine option. Changes were also made in the suspension and control arms. Hydraulic dampers were installed on the rear suspension while a completely new front suspension appeared, replacing the elliptic leaf springs and friction dampers with a trailing arm with transverse torsion bars and hydraulic dampers. Three type B ERAs were modified to type C standard, cars R4B, R8B, and R12B.

=== D-Type ===
The D-Type was the designation for the number R4B ERA after modification in 1938. R4B had previously become R4C before being modified to this standard.

=== E-Type ===
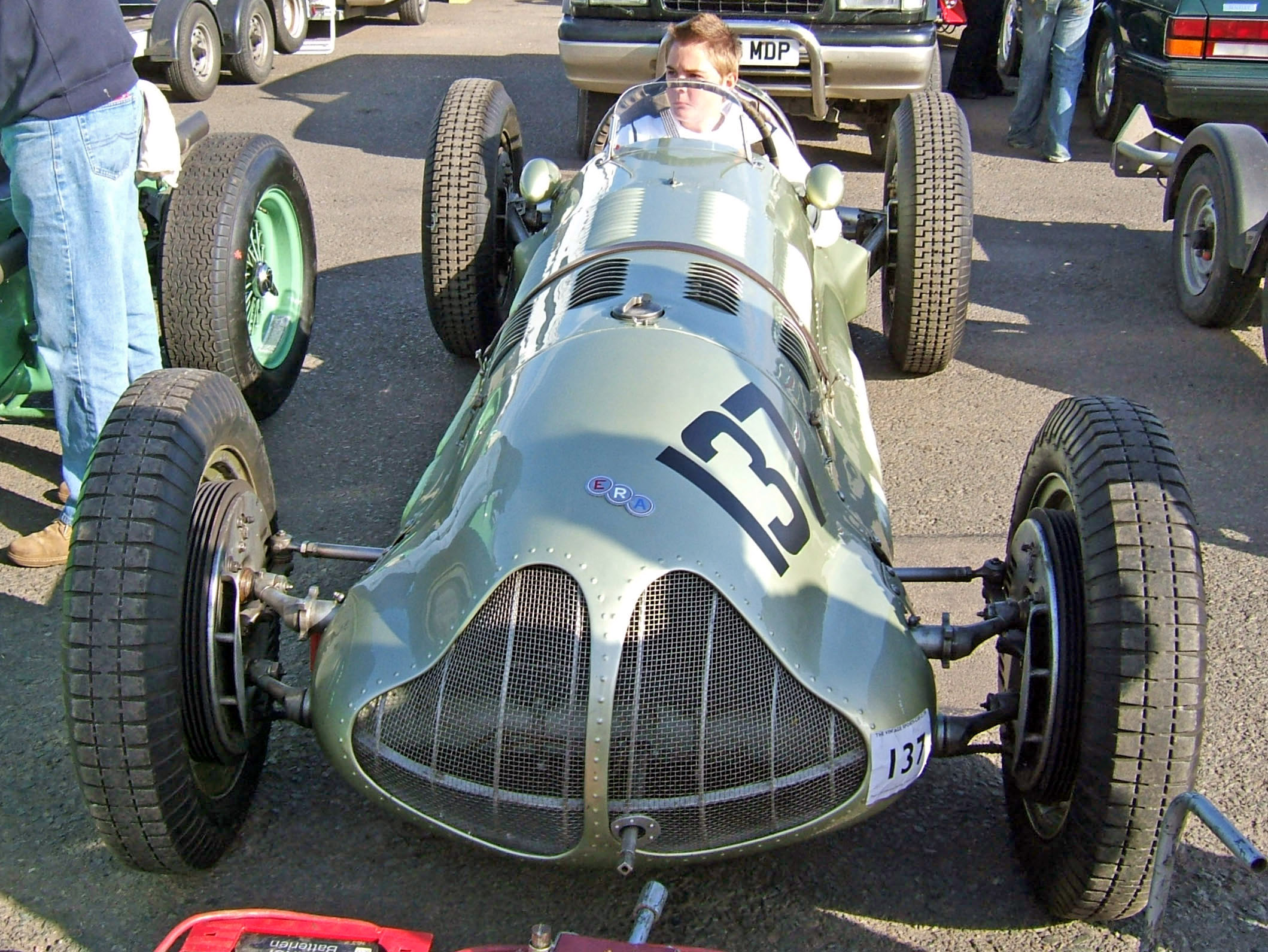
1938 E-Type chassis no. GP1, raced by H.L. Brooke, Leslie Johnson, Reg Parnell, Peter Walker and Peter Whitehead

The more modern E-Type ERA appeared just before the Second World War but was not fully developed, with only one car, GP1, actually racing.

== Postwar history ==
The Second World War brought a halt to motor racing in Europe, and the team's Bourne site was sold to the Bus operator Delaine who occupied adjacent premises. The original building is still in use today by Delaine as an office block. By the time racing resumed in the late 1940s Berthon and Mays had moved on to the British Racing Motors (BRM) project.

=== E-Type ===
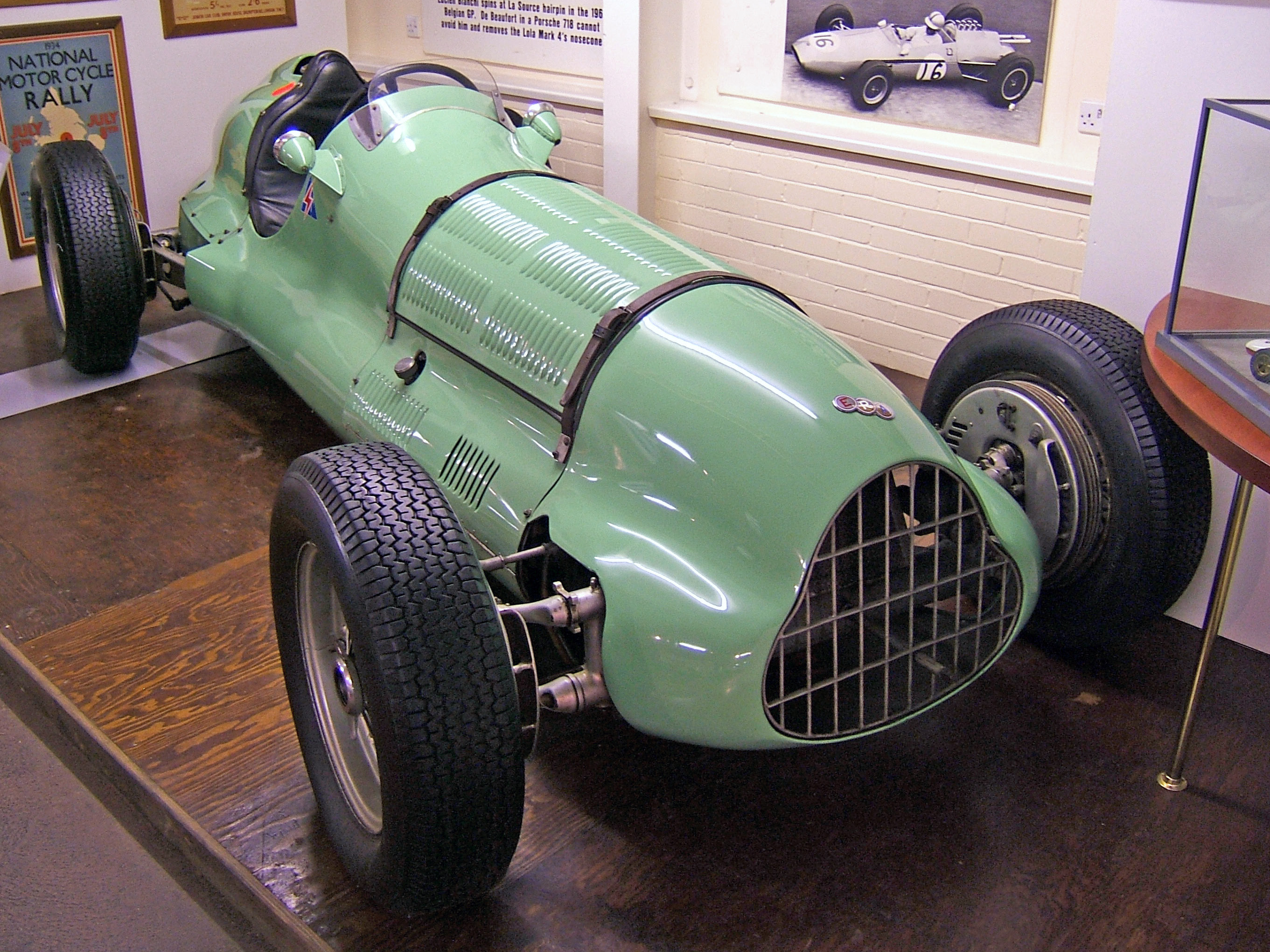
Leslie Johnson's E-Type, GP2, displayed in the Donington Grand Prix Exhibition museum

ERA restarted operations in Dunstable under new ownership in 1947 when Leslie Johnson bought the company, together with ERA E-Type GP2, the second of two built in 1939, which had been raced by Reg Parnell and Leslie Brooke. Refitted with a Zoller supercharger and driven by Johnson, GP2 tied with Parnell's Maserati 4CLT for fastest lap in the 1948 British Empire Trophy and finished fifth. In the same race GP1, upgraded by the works with Murray Jamieson-designed Roots-type supercharging and driven by Reg Parnell's mechanic Wilkie Wilkinson (who had supervised modification of the E-Types), retired with a broken connecting rod.

After posting the fastest time in the opening practice session for the 1948 British Grand Prix, Johnson retired GP2 from third place on the first lap when a driveshaft universal joint failed. In practice for the Coupe du Salon at Montlhéry he broke the lap record but retired GP2 from the race with a fractured fuel tank after three laps.

In 1949 at Goodwood GP2 broke a back axle universal joint in practice but Johnson took the car to fifth in the Richmond Trophy and third in the Chichester Cup. In the first day's practice for the Jersey International Road Race, he was second-fastest to Luigi Villoresi's record-breaking lap in a Maserati but on the second day the engine bearings failed and the car did not race. At Silverstone's 1950 Grand Prix d'Europe the supercharger disintegrated after two laps.

Meanwhile, GP1, driven by Fred Ashmore, failed to finish the 1948 Jersey International Road Race owing to fuel starvation and defective steering.

In the 1949 BRDC/Daily Express International Trophy, Peter Walker took GP1 to within 1.2 seconds of Giuseppe Farina's Maserati in practice and finished fifth in the race, despite gearbox and steering problems, a leaking radiator, and the exhaust burning the driver's foot. Walker was fastest in practice for Ireland's Wakefield Trophy road race, but a snatching brake forced him down the escape road at the first corner. Here GP1's race ended when it was hit by an Alta that had already collided with Salvadori's Maserati 4CL.

Finally in 1950, GP1 was gutted by fire in a crash at the British Empire Trophy race on the Isle of Man, caused by driveshaft failure when the car was at high speed with Walker at the wheel.

=== G-Type ===
The 2-litre G-Type raced in the 1952 World Championship, the first season to be run under Formula Two rules. The fundamental design was laid down by Robert Eberan-Eberhorst, one of the world's leading theorists of racing car design, who had replaced Ferdinand Porsche at Auto Union and designed the Auto Union Type D Grand Prix car. His protégé and successor David Hodkin completed the G-Type design. The frame was constructed of two longitudinal magnesium tubes with four crossmembers. Suspension was by double wishbone with coil springs at the front and de Dion tube at the rear. The car was powered by a Bristol engine with modifications to Hodkin's specifications.

Stirling Moss drove, but the engine was unreliable and the race results were disappointing. Moss said: "It was, above all, a project which made an awful lot of fuss about doing very little. By this time I was very disillusioned by the Clever Professor approach to racing car design. I would eventually learn that even the most brilliant concept could fail if the team concerned lacks the manpower and organization and money to develop the inevitable bugs out of it."

Johnson sold the project to Bristol—who used the car as the basis for an assault on Le Mans that would bring them several class wins in the mid-1950s—and focused the company on research and development (R&D) engineering. He eventually sold it to Zenith Carburettor Ltd, which was then purchased by Solex, another carburettor firm.

=== Chassis design for the Jowett Jupiter ===
In 1949 von Eberhorst, working for ERA, designed the space-frame chassis for the Jowett Jupiter.

=== Legacy ===
Although renamed Engineering Research and Application Ltd, and still primarily an R&D operation, ERA still did a small amount of race preparation. In the 1980s it put its name to the ERA Mini Turbo, a turbocharged version of the Mini.

== Today ==
=== ERAs in competition ===
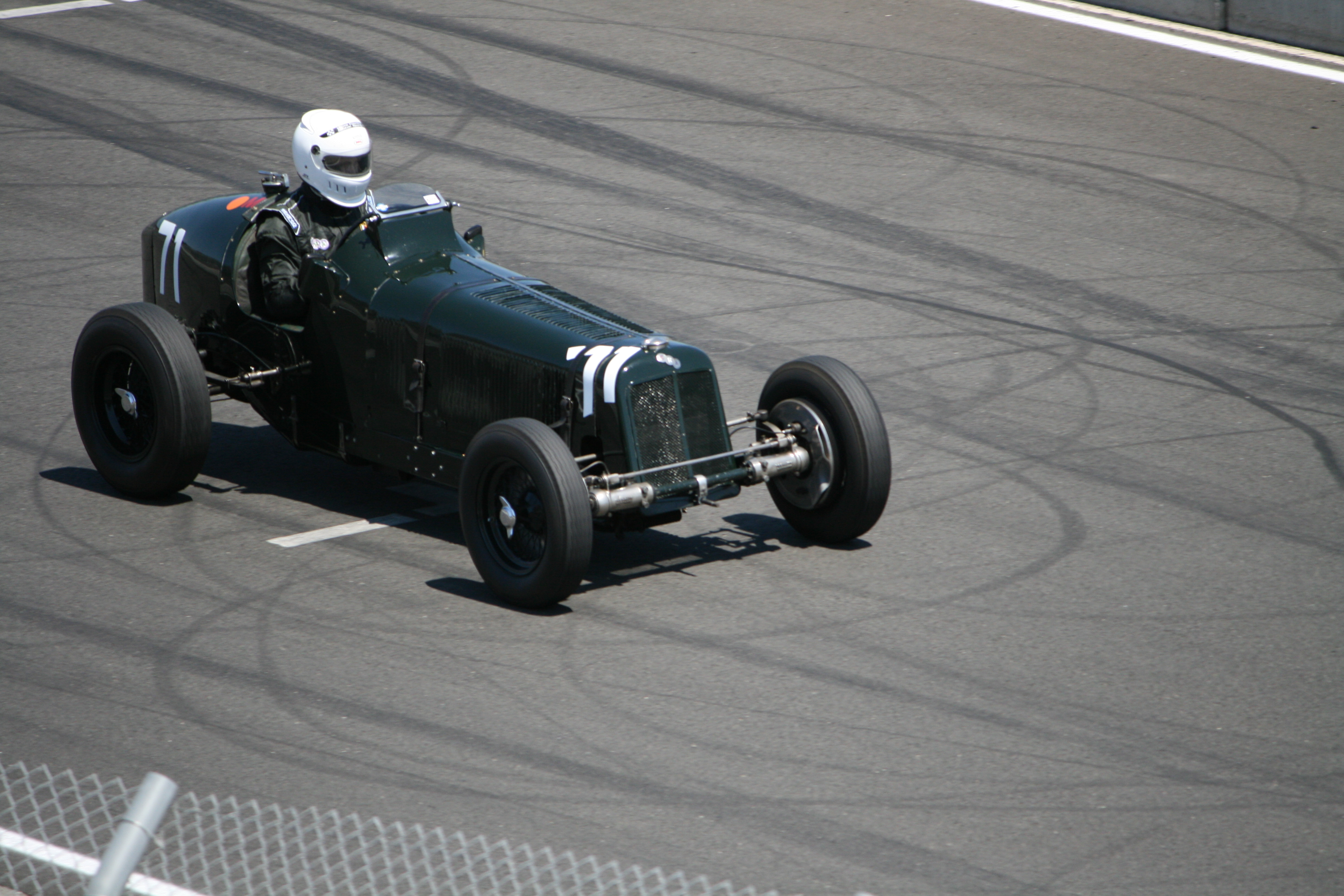
1934 1.5-litre ERA R2A at Mazda Raceway Laguna Seca in 2008

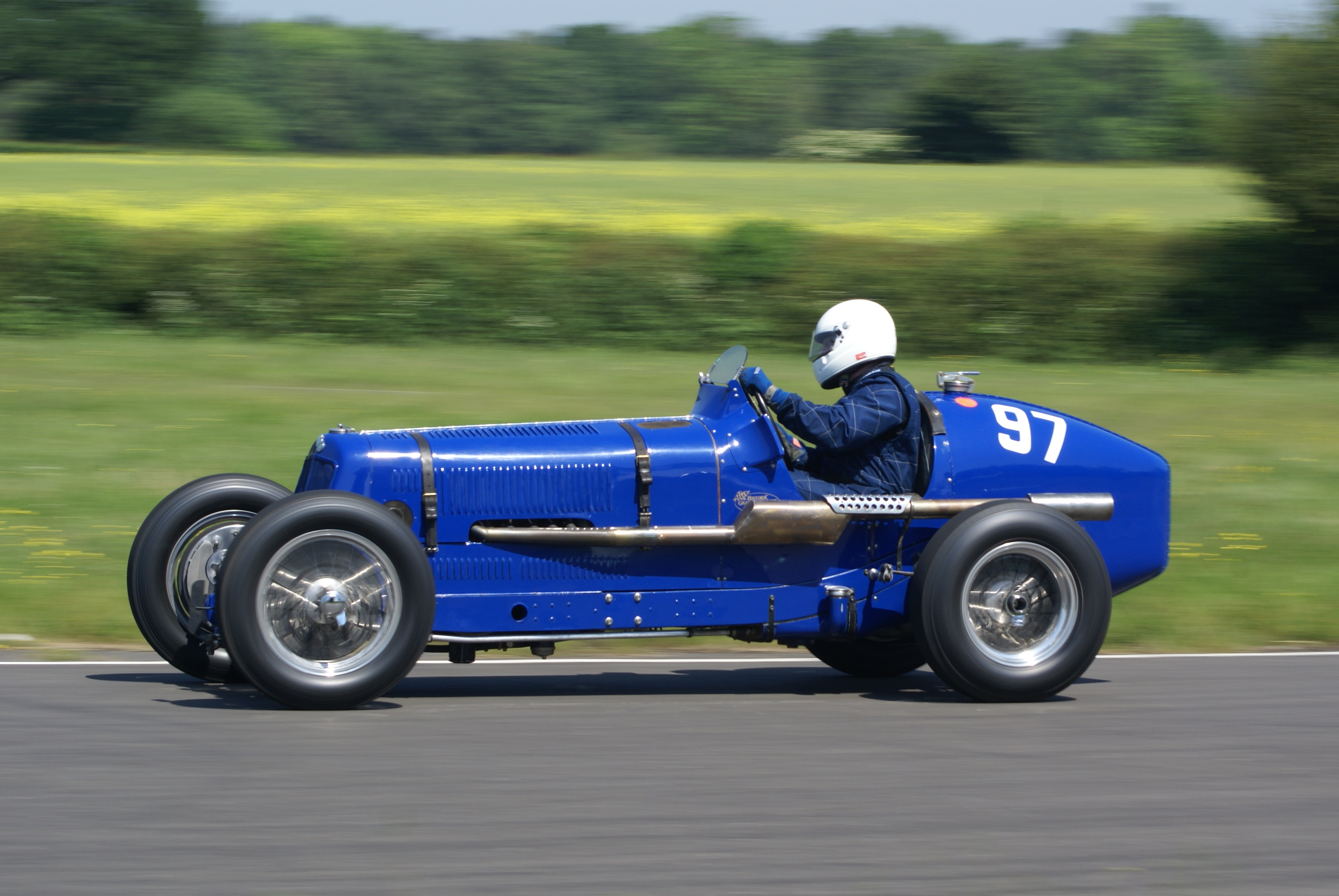
1937 E.R.A. R12C at VSCC Curborough Speed Trials 2009

The vast majority of prewar ERAs are still in existence, and they have continuous and verifiable provenance. They still compete in historic events like the Historic Monaco Grand Prix, where despite the youngest being nearly seventy years old. The cars are particularly associated with the Historic Monaco Grand Prix, where they won nine times, and the Shelsley Walsh hillclimb thanks in large part to Mays, who won the first two British Hill Climb Championships in 1947 and 1948; indeed an ERA has for many years held the hill record for a prewar car.

=== Mays exhibition ===
There is a permanent exhibition about Raymond Mays' contribution to motor racing, including his ERA days, at Bourne Civic Society's heritage centre in Bourne. It is open on weekend and bank holiday afternoons.

=== ERA trademark ===
The ERA trademark is currently owned by Tiger Racing

== Complete Formula One World Championship results ==
Key: D=Dunlop

Year	Chassis	Engine	Tyres	Driver	1	2	3	4	5	6	7	8
1950					GBR	MON	500	SUI	BEL	FRA	ITA	
1950	ERA E-Type	ERA 1.5 L6s	D	(United Kingdom) Leslie Johnson	Ret							
1950	ERA E-Type	ERA 1.5 L6s	D	(United Kingdom) Peter Walker	Ret*							
1950	ERA E-Type	ERA 1.5 L6s	D	(United Kingdom) Tony Rolt	Ret*							
1950	ERA B-Type; ERA C-Type	ERA 1.5 L6s	D	(United Kingdom) Cuth Harrison	7	Ret					Ret	
1950	ERA C-Type; ERA A-Type	ERA 1.5 L6s	D	(United Kingdom) Bob Gerard	6	6						
1951					SUI	500	BEL	FRA	GBR	GER	ITA	ESP
1951	ERA B-Type	ERA 1.5 L6s	D	(United Kingdom) Bob Gerard					11			
1951	ERA B-Type	ERA 1.5 L6s	D	(United Kingdom) Brian Shawe-Taylor					8			
1952					SUI	500	BEL	FRA	GBR	GER	NED	ITA
1952	ERA G-Type	Bristol BS1 2.0 L6	D	(United Kingdom) Stirling Moss			Ret		Ret		Ret	

* Indicates shared drive

== Bibliography ==
- ERA Gold Portfolio, 1934–1994, Brooklands Books - compilation of historic and contemporary articles on ERA and includes the full text of John Lloyd's The Story of ERA
- ERA: The History of English Racing Automobiles, David Weguelin, White Mouse Press: expensive and scarce but hugely detailed and profusely illustrated book covering the contemporary and historic career of all the cars.
