= 1949 British Empire Trophy =

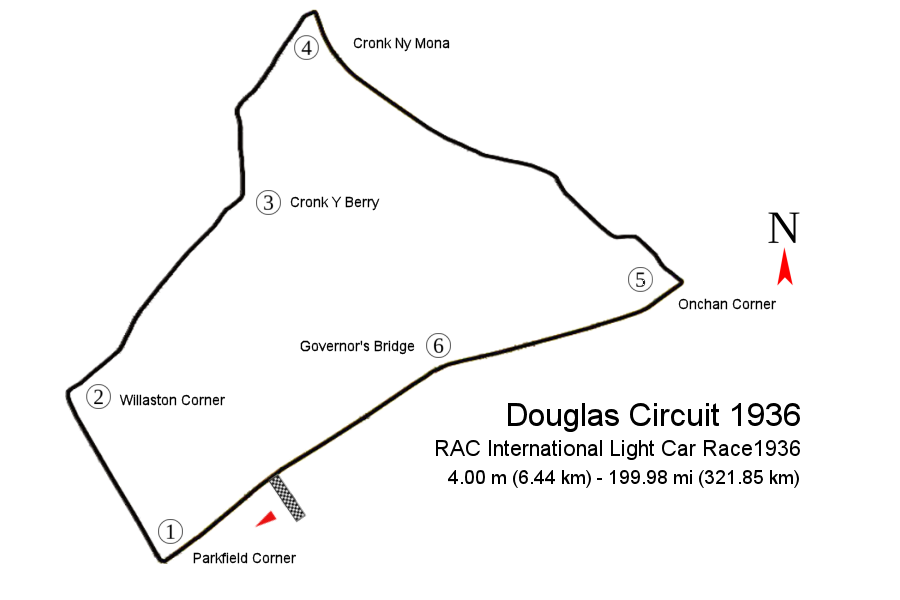

Race details
- Date: 26 May 1949
- Official name: XI British Empire Trophy
- Location: Douglas Circuit; Douglas, Isle of Man
- Course length: 6.45 kilometres (4.01 miles)
- Distance: 36 laps, 224.79 kilometres (139.68 miles)

Pole position
Driver	(United Kingdom) Reg Parnell	Maserati
- Time: 3:06.0

Fastest lap
Driver	(United Kingdom) Bob Gerard	ERA
- Time: 3:09.0

Podium
First	(United Kingdom) Bob Gerard	ERA
Second	(United Kingdom) John Horsfall	ERA
Third	(United Kingdom) Fred Ashmore	Maserati

The 11th British Empire Trophy was a Formula One motor race held on 26 May 1950 at the Douglas Circuit, in Douglas, Isle of Man. The 36-lap race was won by ERA driver Bob Gerard. John Horsfall finished second in another ERA, and Fred Ashmore was third in a Maserati.

== Results ==
Pos	No.	Driver	Entrant	Constructor	Time/Retired	Grid
1	14	(United Kingdom) Bob Gerard	F.R. Gerard	ERA B-Type	1.57:54, 71.06mph	4
2	6	(United Kingdom) John Horsfall	P.H. Bell	ERA B-Type	+1:29	5
3	28	(United Kingdom) Fred Ashmore	R. Parnell	Maserati 4CLT/48	+1:33	10
4	16	(United Kingdom) Cuth Harrison	T.C. Harrison	ERA C-Type	+3:03	7
5	20	(United Kingdom) Peter Walker	P.N. Whitehead	ERA B-Type	+1 lap	2
6	50	(United Kingdom) Tony Rolt	A.P.R. Rolt	Aitken-Alfa Romeo	+1 lap	6
7	10	(United Kingdom) David Hampshire	D.A. Hampshire	ERA B-Type	+2 laps	8
8	48	(Belgium) Johnny Claes	Écurie Belge	Talbot-Lago T26C	+2 laps	12
9	12	(United Kingdom) Geoff Ansell	G.E. Ansell	ERA B-Type	+2 laps	11
10	2	(United Kingdom) John Heath	G.E. Abecassis	Alta GP	+2 laps	17
11	40	(United Kingdom) Geoff Richardson	G.N. Richardson	RRA-ERA	+4 laps	14
12	44	(United Kingdom) Guy Jason-Henry	R.R.C. Walker	Delahaye 135	+4 laps	16
13	8	(United Kingdom) George Nixon	G.R. Nixon	ERA A-Type	+5 laps	15
Ret	24	(United Kingdom) David Murray	D. Murray	ERA	26 laps, gearbox	9
Ret	30	(United Kingdom) Reg Parnell	R. Parnell	Maserati 4CLT/48	5 laps, supercharger drive	1
Ret	4	(United Kingdom) Michael Chorlton	M.C. Chorlton	CDL-Bugatti	5 laps, fuel tank	13
DNS	2	(United Kingdom) George Abecassis	G.E. Abecassis	Alta GP	car driven by Heath	3
DNS	4	(United Kingdom) James Boothby	M.C. Chorlton	CDL-Bugatti	car driven by Chorlton	-
DNS	6	(United Kingdom) John Bolster	P.H. Bell	ERA B-Type	car driven by Horsfall	-
DNS	44	(United Kingdom) Tony Rolt	R.R.C. Walker	Delahaye 135	car driven by Jason-Henry	-
DNS	50	(United Kingdom) Guy Jason-Henry	A.P.R. Rolt	Aitken-Alfa Romeo	car driven by Rolt	-
DNA	18	(United Kingdom) Leslie Johnson	T.A.S.O. Mathieson	ERA E-Type		
DNA	22	(United Kingdom) Peter Whitehead	P.N. Whitehead	Ferrari 125		
DNA	26	(United Kingdom) Bob Ansell	R.E. Ansell	Maserati 4CL		
DNA	32	(Italy) Luigi Villoresi	Scuderia Ambrosiana	Maserati 4CLT/48		
DNA	34	(United Kingdom) Roy Salvadori	R.F. Salvadori	Maserati 4CL		
DNA	36	(United Kingdom) Archie Baring	A.A. Baring	Maserati 4CM		
DNA	38	(United Kingdom) Ernest Ramseyer	Écurie Genève	Maserati 4CM		
DNA	42	(United Kingdom) Archie Butterworth	A.J. Butterworth	AJB-Steyr		
DNA	46	(United Kingdom) Gordon Watson	G.M. Watson	Alta IFS		

Previous race: 1949 Marseille Grand Prix	Formula One non-championship races 1949 season	Next race: 1949 Formula One Grand Prix des Frontières
Previous race: 1948 British Empire Trophy	British Empire Trophy	Next race: 1950 British Empire Trophy
