= 1948 British Empire Trophy =

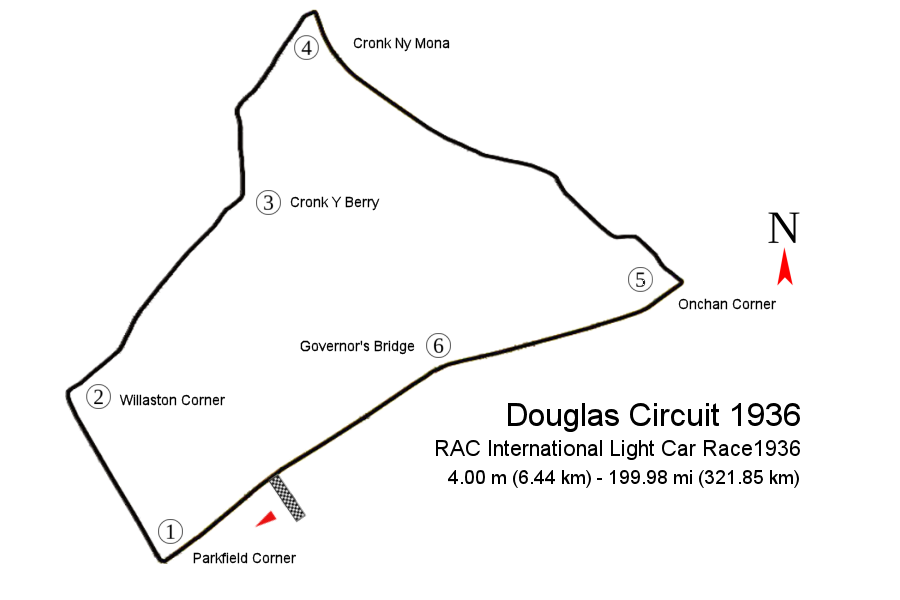

Race details
- Date: 25 May 1948
- Official name: X British Empire Trophy
- Location: Douglas Circuit; Douglas, Isle of Man
- Course length: 6.45 kilometres (4.01 miles)
- Distance: 36 laps, 224.79 kilometres (139.68 miles)

Pole position
Driver	(United Kingdom) Bob Gerard	ERA
- Time: 3:10

Fastest lap
Drivers	(United Kingdom) Reg Parnell	Maserati
	(United Kingdom) Leslie Johnson	ERA
- Time: 3:13

Podium
First	(United Kingdom) Geoffrey Ansell	ERA
Second	(United Kingdom) David Hampshire	Delage
Third	(United Kingdom) Leslie Brooke	ERA

The 10th British Empire Trophy was a Formula One motor race held on 25 May 1948 at the Douglas Circuit, in Douglas, Isle of Man.

== Summary ==
The 36-lap race was won by ERA driver Geoffrey Ansell. David Hampshire finished second in a Delage, and Leslie Brooke was third in an ERA. Bob Gerard started from pole position in his ERA but retired with brake problems. Reg Parnell (Maserati) and Leslie Johnson (ERA) set joint fastest lap.

Reg Parnell led from half-distance, having overtaken Bob Ansell, and was leading into the final lap, but the pump on his auxiliary fuel tank failed, and the Maserati rolled to a halt; attempts to float the fuel included pouring beer into the auxiliary tank, but all was to no avail, and Geoffrey Ansell swept past for the victory.

== Results ==
Pos	No.	Driver	Entrant	Constructor	Time/Retired	Grid
1	10	(United Kingdom) Geoffrey Ansell	Geoffrey Ansell	ERA B-Type	2:03:45, 108.93kph	6
2	12	(United Kingdom) David Hampshire	Joe Ashmore	Delage 158L	+43s	11
3	16	(United Kingdom) Leslie Brooke	Leslie Brooke	ERA B-Type	+1:34	7
4	22	(United Kingdom) Cuth Harrison	T.C. Harrison	ERA B-Type	+1 lap	15
5	24	(United Kingdom) Leslie Johnson	Leslie Johnson	ERA E-Type	+2 laps	24
6	4	(United Kingdom) Gordon Watson	Gordon Watson	Alta	+3 laps	21
7	52	(United Kingdom) Guy Jason-Henry	Selbourne Mayfair	Delahaye 135S	+4 laps	18
8	6	(United Kingdom) Michael Chorlton	Michael Chorlton	Bugatti Type 51A	+6 laps	22
9	42	(United Kingdom) Archie Baring	A.A. Baring	Maserati 6CM	+12 laps	17
Ret	40	(United Kingdom) Reg Parnell	Reg Parnell	Maserati 4CL	35 laps, out of fuel	2
Ret	38	(United Kingdom) Bob Ansell	Reg Parnell	Maserati 4CL	28 laps, brakes	4
Ret	14	(United Kingdom) John Bolster	P.H. Bell	ERA B-Type	25 laps, half-shaft	9
Ret	26	(United Kingdom) Raymond Mays	Raymond Mays	ERA B-Type	21 laps, supercharger	5
Ret	50	(United Kingdom) Tony Rolt	A.P.R. Rolt	Alfa Romeo Tipo B	12 laps, rear axle	3
Ret	54	(United Kingdom) Paul Emery	Emeryson Cars	Emeryson-Duesenberg	12 laps, transmission	8
Ret	48	(United Kingdom) Roy Salvadori	Roy Salvadori	Maserati 4CM	10 laps, valve	20
Ret	20	(United Kingdom) Bob Gerard	Bob Gerard	ERA B-Type	9 laps, accident	1
Ret	30	(United Kingdom) Wilkie Wilkinson	Reg Parnell	ERA E-Type	5 laps, connecting rod	13
Ret	32	(United Kingdom) Peter Walker	Peter Walker	ERA B-Type	4 laps, engine	19
Ret	36	(United Kingdom) Duncan Hamilton	George Abecassis	Maserati 6CM	4 laps, accident	10
Ret	2	(United Kingdom) George Abecassis	George Abecassis	Alta GP	2 laps, gearbox	12
DNS	18	(United Kingdom) Sheila Darbishire	Sheila Darbishire	ERA B-Type		23
DNS	40	(United Kingdom) Fred Ashmore	Reg Parnell	Maserati 4CL	car driven by Parnell	14
DNS	44	(United Kingdom) John Gordon	John Gordon	Maserati 6CM		16

Previous race: 1948 Nations Grand Prix	Formula One non-championship races 1948 season	Next race: 1948 Paris Grand Prix
Previous race: 1947 British Empire Trophy	British Empire Trophy	Next race: 1949 British Empire Trophy
