= 1947 British Empire Trophy =

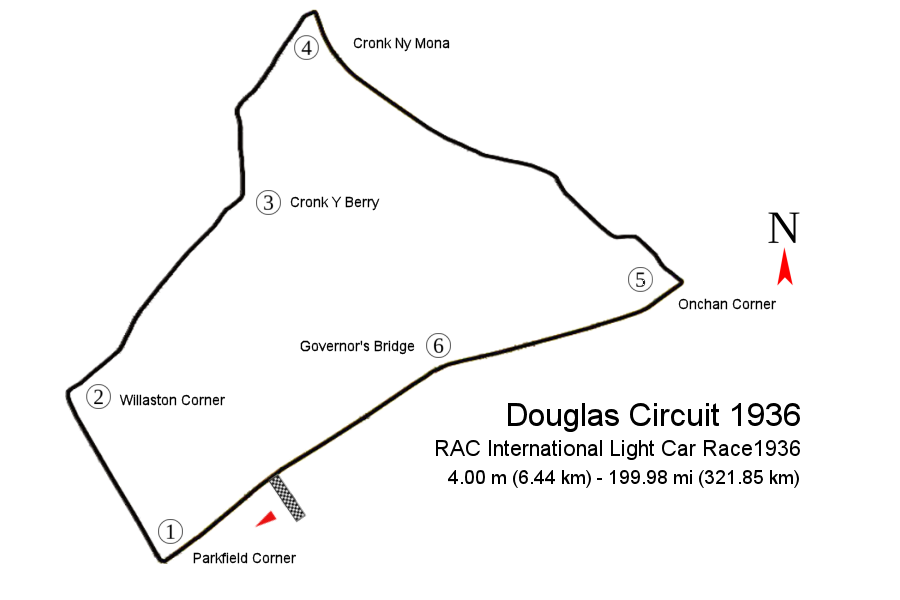

Race details
- Date: 21 August 1947
- Official name: IX British Empire Trophy
- Location: Douglas Circuit, Isle of Man
- Course: Temporary road circuit
- Course length: 6.45 kilometres (4.01 miles)
- Distance: 40 laps, 249.588 kilometres (155.087 miles)

Pole position
Driver	(Thailand) B. Bira	Maserati
- Time: 3:16

Fastest lap
Driver	(United Kingdom) Bob Gerard	ERA
- Time: 3:18

Podium
First	(United Kingdom) Bob Gerard	ERA
Second	(United Kingdom) Peter Whitehead	ERA
Third	(United Kingdom) Bob Ansell	Maserati

The 9th British Empire Trophy was a Formula One motor race held on 21 August 1947 at the Douglas Circuit, in Douglas, Isle of Man. The 40 lap race was won by Bob Gerard in an ERA B-Type, setting fastest lap in the process. Peter Whitehead finished second in another B-Type, and Bob Ansell was third in a Maserati 4CL. B. Bira started from pole position in his Maserati 4CL and finished fifth.

== Results ==
Pos	No.	Driver	Entrant	Constructor	Time/Retired	Grid
1	22	(United Kingdom) Bob Gerard	F.R. Gerard	ERA B-Type	2:16:52, 109.46kph	5
2	32	(United Kingdom) Peter Whitehead	Peter Whitehead	ERA B-Type	+1:43	2
3	36	(United Kingdom) Bob Ansell	Bob Ansell	Maserati 4CL	+1 lap	7
4	20	(United Kingdom) Leslie Brooke	English Racing Automobiles	ERA E-Type	+2 laps	9
5	34	(Thailand) B. Bira	Prince Chula	Maserati 4CL	+2 laps	1
6	16	(United Kingdom) Brian Shawe-Taylor (United Kingdom) George Bainbridge	Bob Ansell	ERA B-Type	+2 laps	8
7	12	(United Kingdom) Barry Woodall	Barry Woodall	Delage 15S8	+4 laps	11
8	46	(United Kingdom) Sheila Darbishire	S.B. Reece	Riley	+8 laps	14
9	24	(United Kingdom) Cuth Harrison	Cuth Harrison	ERA B-Type	+12 laps	6
Ret	48	(United Kingdom) Tony Rolt	Tony Rolt	Alfa Romeo Tipo B	24 laps, oil pressure	4
Ret	14	(United Kingdom) George Abecassis	George Abecassis	ERA A-Type	21 laps, accident	3
Ret	10	(United Kingdom) David Hampshire	Reg Parnell	Challenger-Delage	21 laps, magneto	13
Ret	2	(United Kingdom) Geoffrey Crossley	Geoffrey Crossley	Alta	18 laps, piston	12
Ret	38	(United Kingdom) Guy Jason-Henry	J.S. Gordon	Maserati 6C-1500	8 laps, out of fuel	15
Ret	50	(United Kingdom) Leslie Johnson	Leslie Johnson	Talbot 150C	0 laps, fire	10
DNS	8	(United Kingdom) Michael Chorlton	Michael Chorlton	Bugatti Type 51A		

Previous race: 1947 Montevideo Grand Prix	Formula One non-championship races 1947 season	Next race: 1947 Mar del Plata Grand Prix
Previous race: 1946 British Empire Trophy	British Empire Trophy	Next race: 1948 British Empire Trophy
