= 1950 British Empire Trophy =

- Non-championship race in the 1950 Formula One season
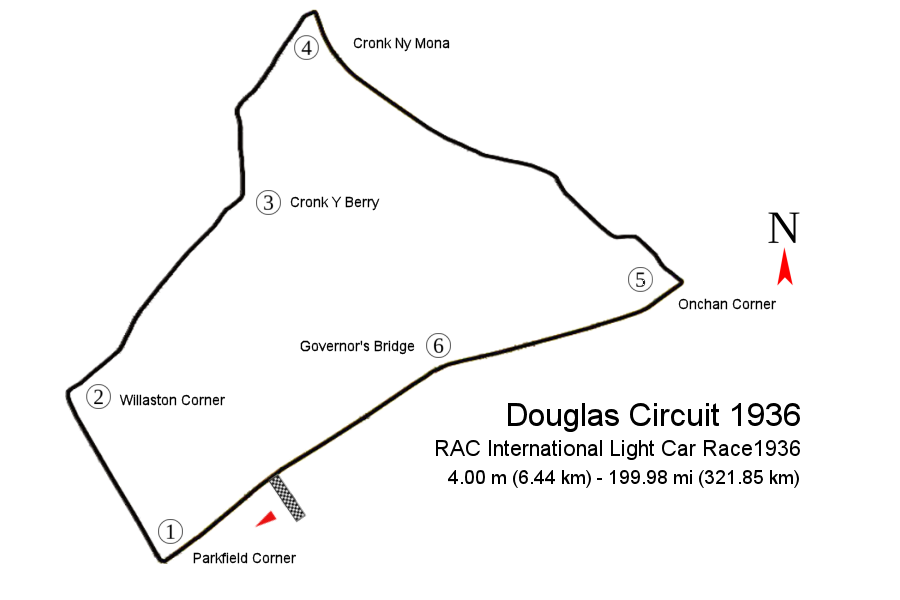

Race details
- Date: 15 June 1950
- Official name: XII British Empire Trophy
- Location: Douglas Circuit; Douglas, Isle of Man; United Kingdom
- Course length: 6.45 km (4.011 miles)
- Distance: 36 laps, 354.787 km (220.454 miles)

Pole position
Driver	(United Kingdom) Cuth Harrison	ERA
- Time: 3:10.0

Fastest lap
Driver	(United Kingdom) Reg Parnell	Maserati
- Time: 3:08.0

Podium
First	(United Kingdom) Bob Gerard	ERA
Second	(United Kingdom) Cuth Harrison	ERA
Third	(Switzerland) Toulo de Graffenried	Maserati

The 1950 British Empire Trophy was a non-Championship Formula One motor race held on 15 June 1950 at the Douglas Circuit, in Douglas, Isle of Man. It was the ninth race of the 1950 Formula One season.

The 36-lap race was won by ERA driver Bob Gerard. Cuth Harrison finished second in an ERA, and Emmanuel de Graffenried third in a Maserati.

== Results ==
Pos	No.	Driver	Entrant	Constructor	Time/Retired	Grid
1	1	(United Kingdom) Bob Gerard	Bob Gerard	ERA	1.59:36.8	3
2	12	(United Kingdom) Cuth Harrison	Cuth Harrison	ERA	+ 1:32.4	1
3	5	(Switzerland) Toulo de Graffenried	Enrico Platé	Maserati	+ 2:48.1	7
4	15	(United Kingdom) Brian Shawe-Taylor	Brian Shawe-Taylor	ERA	+ 2:58.8	5
5	3	(United Kingdom) David Hampshire	Scuderia Ambrosiana	Maserati	35 laps	6
6	2	(United Kingdom) Reg Parnell	Scuderia Ambrosiana	Maserati	35 laps	8
7	7	(United Kingdom) Tony Rolt	Rob Walker Racing Team	Delage	35 laps	2
Ret	11	(United Kingdom) Graham Whitehead	Graham Whitehead	ERA	Lost wheel	9
Ret	14	(United Kingdom) Colin Murray	Charles Murray	Maserati	Accident	12
Ret	9	(United Kingdom) Gordon Watson	Gordon Watson	Alta F2	Piston	11
Ret	6	(Thailand) Prince Bira	Enrico Platé	Maserati	Accident	13
Ret	4	(United Kingdom) David Murray	Scuderia Ambrosiana	ERA	Accident	4
Ret	16	(Republic of Ireland) Joe Kelly	Joe Kelly	Maserati	Accident	10
DNS	10	(United Kingdom) Peter Walker	Peter Walker	ERA	Fire	–
DNS	8	(United Kingdom) John Rowley	J.W. Rowley	Delage	Camshaft drive	–
DNA	17	(United Kingdom) Alister Baring	A.A. Baring	HWM-Alta	Car not ready	–
DNA	18	(United Kingdom) Bobby Baird	W.R. Baird	Tornado-Clemons Duesenburg	Car not ready	–
DNA	19	(United Kingdom) Archie J. Butterworth	A.J. Butterworth	A.J.B.-Steyr	Car not ready	–

Previous race: 1950 Paris Grand Prix	Formula One non-championship races 1950 season	Next race: 1950 Bari Grand Prix
Previous race: 1949 British Empire Trophy	British Empire Trophy	Next race: 1951 British Empire Trophy
