= British Empire Trophy =

Motor race in the United Kingdom

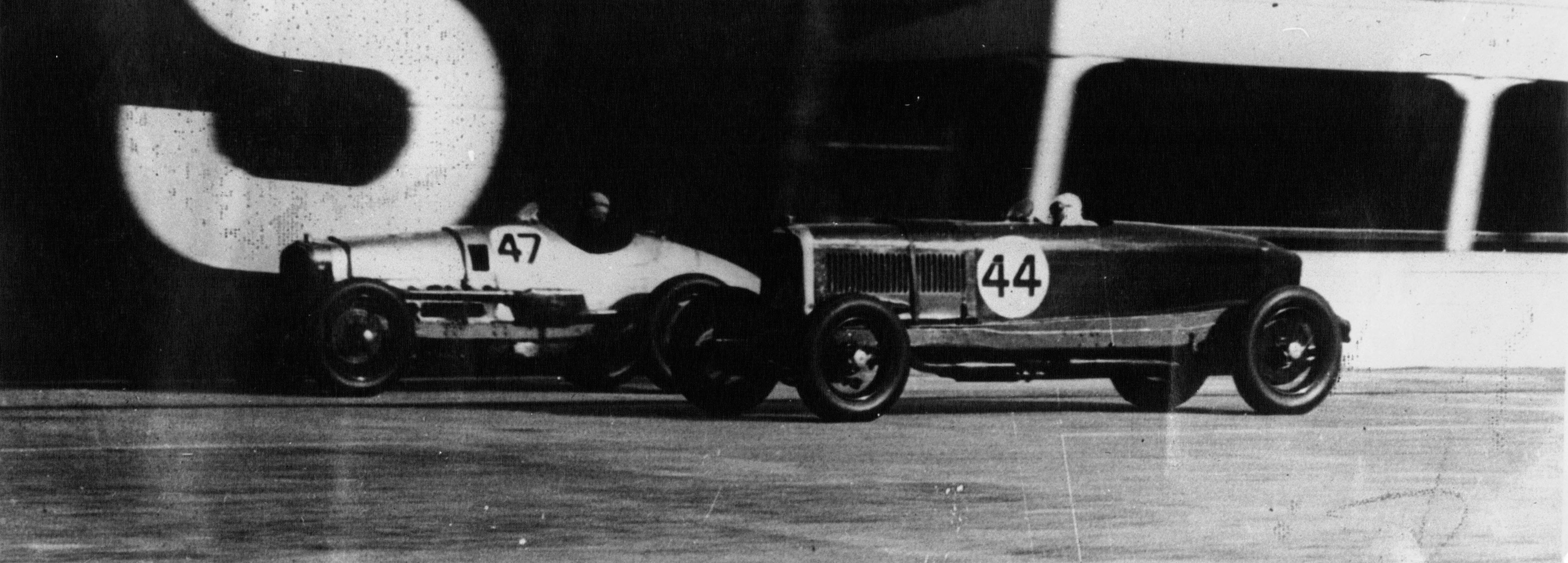
First race in 1932

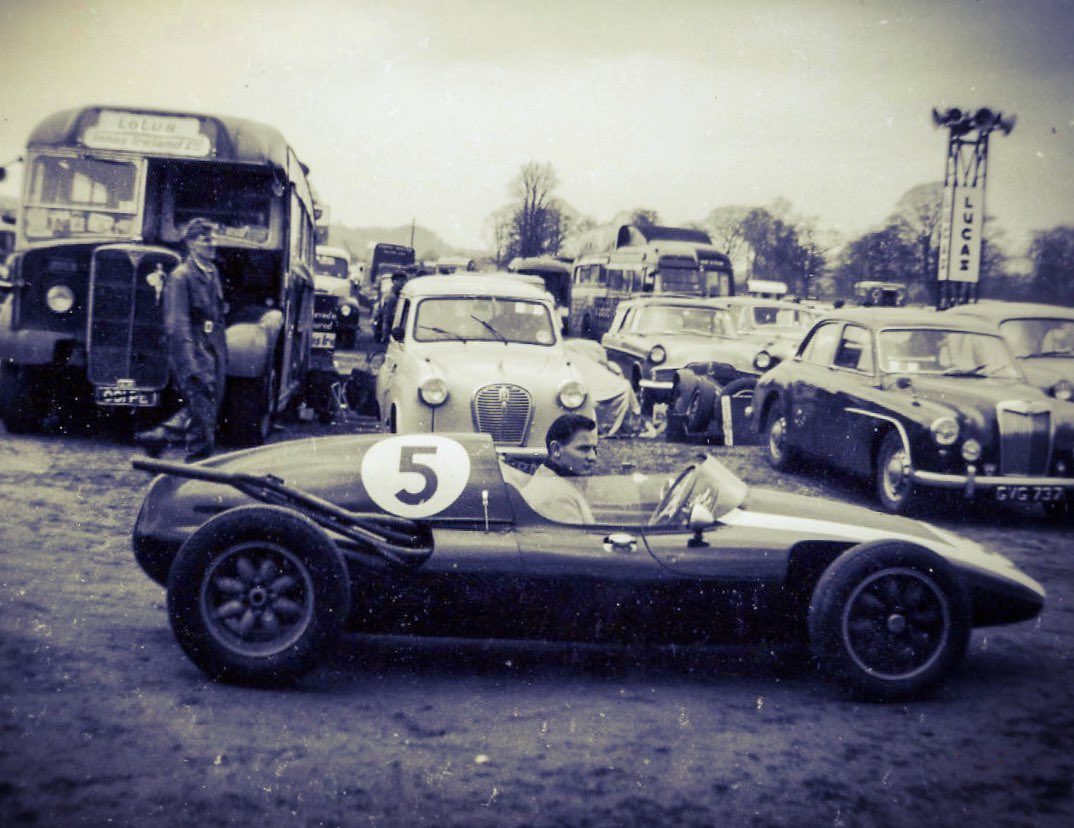
Bruce McLaren at the 1959 British Empire Trophy at Oulton Park

The British Empire Trophy was a motor race in the United Kingdom. Since its inception in 1932, the Empire Trophy was hosted at five different circuits and awarded for eleven separate racing categories. The race was run a total of 44 times, spanning over eight decades, making it one of the longest running and most prestigious racing events.

== History ==
1932–1935:
1936–1939:
1947–1953:
1954–1959:
1960–1961:
1970–1971:
1972–1974:
1977–1978:
1990–2003:
2005–2006:

Brooklands Circuit
Donington Park
Douglas Circuit
Oulton Park
Silverstone Circuit
Oulton Park
Silverstone Circuit
Donington Park
Silverstone Circuit
Silverstone Circuit

Formula Libre - Voiturette
Formula Libre - Voiturette
Grand Prix - Formula 1 - Sports car
Sports car - Formula 2
Formula Junior - Intercontinental Formula
Formula 3
Historics
Historics
GT Sports car
Group C GTP

== Winners by year ==
Year	Circuit	Category	Winner	Manufacturer	Report
1932	Brooklands	Formula Libre	(United Kingdom) John Cobb	Delage V12/LSR	Report
1933	Brooklands	Formula Libre	(Poland) Stanisław Czaykowski	Bugatti T54	Report
1934	Brooklands	Formula Libre	(United Kingdom) George Eyston	MG Magnette K3	Report
1935	Brooklands	Formula Libre	(United Kingdom) Freddie Dixon	Riley 6	Report
1936	Donington Park	Formula Libre	(United Kingdom) Richard Seaman	Maserati 8CM	Report
1937	Donington Park	Formula Libre	(United Kingdom) Raymond Mays	ERA C-Type	Report
1938	Donington Park	Formula Libre	(United Kingdom) Charles Dobson	Austin	Report
1939	Donington Park	Formula Libre	(United Kingdom) Tony Rolt	ERA B	Report
1940–1946 (No racing events held)
1947	Douglas Circuit	Grand Prix	(United Kingdom) Bob Gerard	ERA B	Report
1948	Douglas Circuit	Grand Prix	(United Kingdom) Geoffrey Ansell	ERA B	Report
1949	Douglas Circuit	Grand Prix	(United Kingdom) Bob Gerard	ERA B	Report
1950	Douglas Circuit	Formula One	(United Kingdom) Bob Gerard	ERA B	Report
1951	Douglas Circuit	Sports car	(United Kingdom) Stirling Moss	Frazer Nash Bristol L6 OHV	Report
1952	Douglas Circuit	Sports car	(United Kingdom) Pat Griffith	Lester T51 MG 6850	Report
1953	Douglas Circuit	Sports car	(United Kingdom) Reg Parnell	Aston Martin DB3S	Report
1954	Oulton Park	Sports car	(United Kingdom) Alan Brown	Cooper T22 - Bristol	Report
1955	Oulton Park	Sports car	(United Kingdom) Archie Scott-Brown	Lister-Bristol	Report
1956	Oulton Park	Sports car	(United Kingdom) Stirling Moss	Cooper Climax T39	Report
1957	Oulton Park	Sports car	(United Kingdom) Archie Scott-Brown	Lister-Jaguar	Report
1958	Oulton Park	Sports car	(United Kingdom) Stirling Moss	Aston Martin DBR2/300	Report
1959	Oulton Park	Formula 2	(United Kingdom) Jim Russell	Cooper Climax T45	Report
1960	Silverstone Circuit	Formula Junior	(United Kingdom) Henry Taylor	Lotus 18 - Ford	Report
1961	Silverstone Circuit	Intercontinental	(United Kingdom) Stirling Moss	Cooper Climax T53	Report
1962–1969 (No racing events held)
1970	Oulton Park	Formula 3	(United Kingdom) Bev Bond	Lotus 59A - Ford	Report
1971	Oulton Park	Formula 3	(Australia) David Walker	Lotus 69 - Ford	Report
1972	Silverstone Circuit	Historics	(United Kingdom) Willie Green	Maserati T61	Report
1973	Silverstone Circuit	Historics	(United Kingdom) Neil Corner	Aston Martin DBR4/300	Report
1974	Silverstone Circuit	Historics	(United Kingdom) John Harper	Lister - Jaguar	Report
1975–1976 (No racing events held)
1977	Donington Park	Historics	(United Kingdom) Neil Corner	BRM P25	Report
1978	Donington Park	Historics	(United Kingdom) Neil Corner	BRM P25	Report
1979–1989 (No racing events held)
1990	Silverstone Circuit	Sports car	(United Kingdom) Martin Brundle (France) Alain Ferté	Jaguar XJR-11	Report
1991	Silverstone Circuit	Sports car	(United Kingdom) Derek Warwick (Italy) Teo Fabi	Jaguar XJR-14	Report
1992	Silverstone Circuit	Sports car	(United Kingdom) Derek Warwick (France) Yannick Dalmas	Peugeot 905 B	Report
1993–1994 (No racing events held)
1995	Silverstone Circuit	GT Sports car	(United Kingdom) Andy Wallace (France) Olivier Grouillard	McLaren F1 GTR	Report
1996	Silverstone Circuit	GT Sports car	(United Kingdom) Andy Wallace (France) Olivier Grouillard	McLaren F1 GTR	Report
1997	Silverstone Circuit	GT Sports car	(Netherlands) Peter Kox (Italy) Roberto Ravaglia	McLaren F1 GTR	Report
1998	Silverstone Circuit	GT Sports car	(Germany) Bernd Schneider (Australia) Mark Webber	Mercedes-Benz CLK GTR	Report
1999	Silverstone Circuit	GT Sports car	(Monaco) Olivier Beretta (Austria) Karl Wendlinger	Chrysler Viper GTS-R	Report
2000	Silverstone Circuit	GT Sports car	(United Kingdom) Julian Bailey (United Kingdom) Jamie Campbell-Walter	Lister Storm - Jaguar	Report
2001	Silverstone Circuit	Historics	(United Kingdom) Graham Hathaway (United Kingdom) Gary Pearson	Jaguar XJR-11	Report
2002	Silverstone Circuit	GT Sports car	(Brazil) Thomas Erdos (United Kingdom) Ian McKellar	Saleen S7R	Report
2003	Silverstone Circuit	GT Sports car	(United Kingdom) Piers Johnson (Republic of Ireland) Shane Lynch	TVR T400R	Report
2004 (No racing events held)
2005	Silverstone Circuit	Group C GTP	(United Kingdom) Gary Pearson	Jaguar XJR-11	Report
2006	Silverstone Circuit	Group C GTP	(United Kingdom) David Mercer	Spice SE90C	Report

== Race history by circuit ==
Brooklands (1932–1935)

Donington Park (1936–1939)

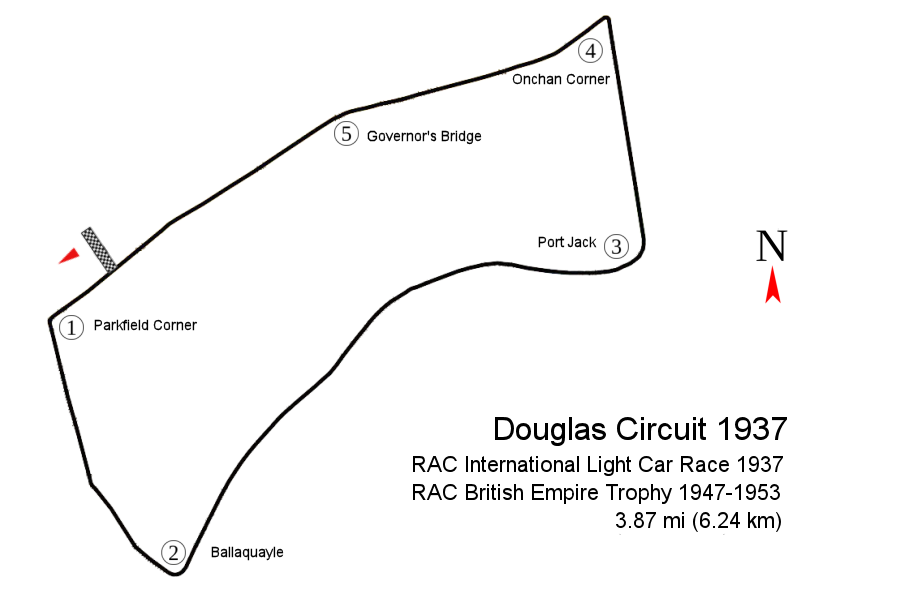
Douglas Circuit (1947–1953)

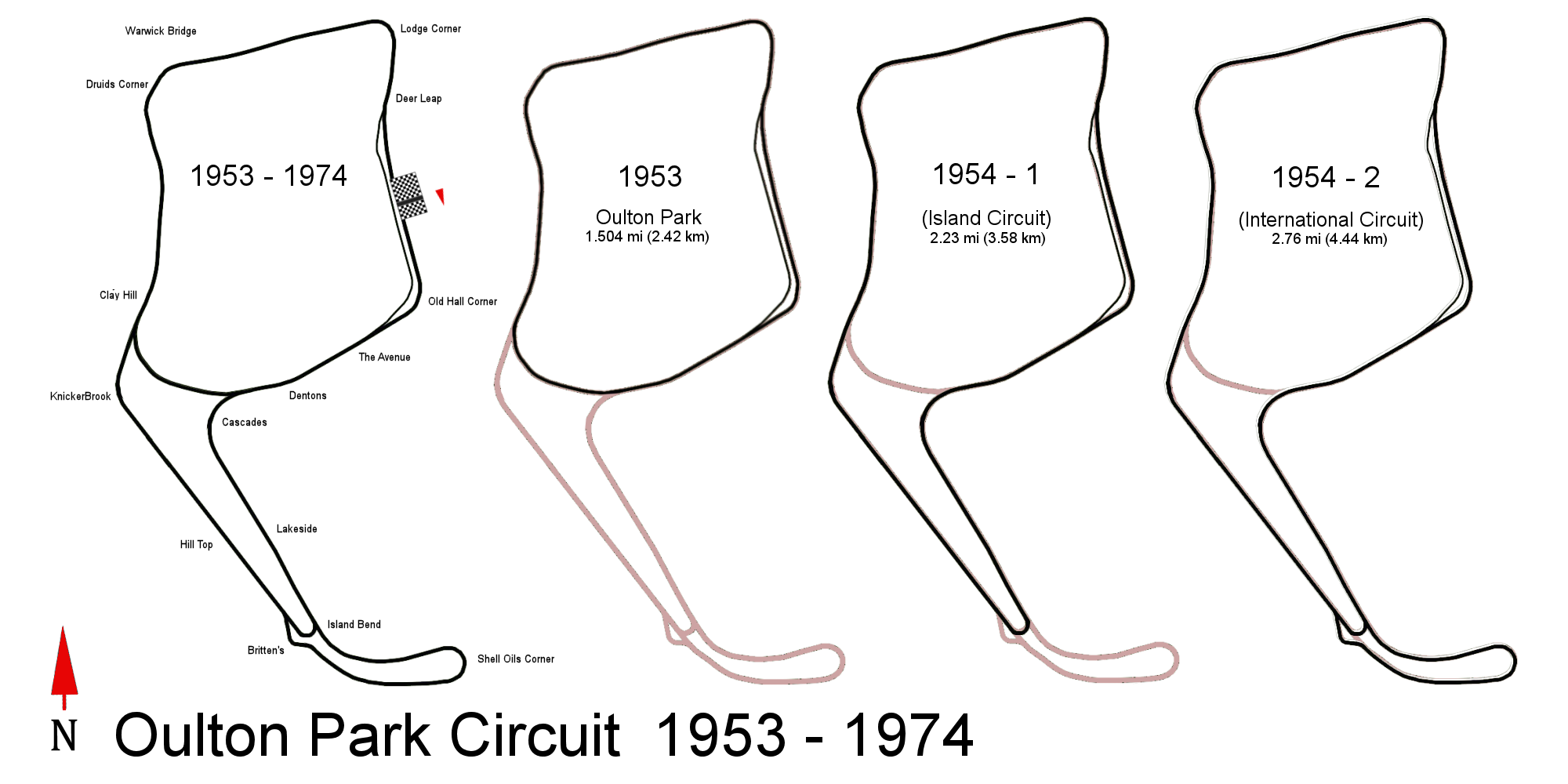
Oulton Park (1954–1959, 1970–1971)

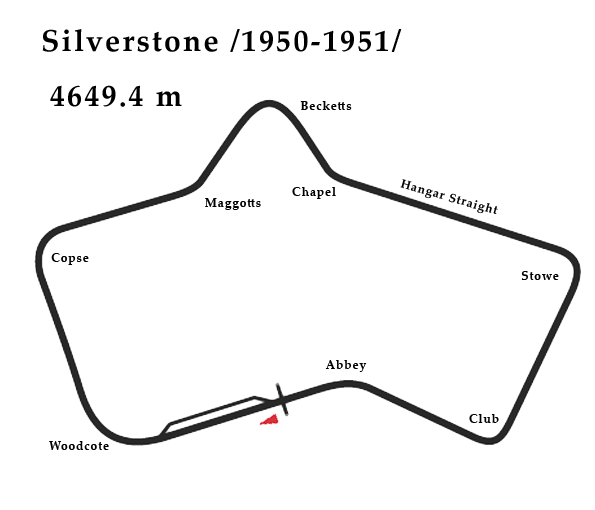
Silverstone (1960–1961, 1972–1974, 1990–2003)

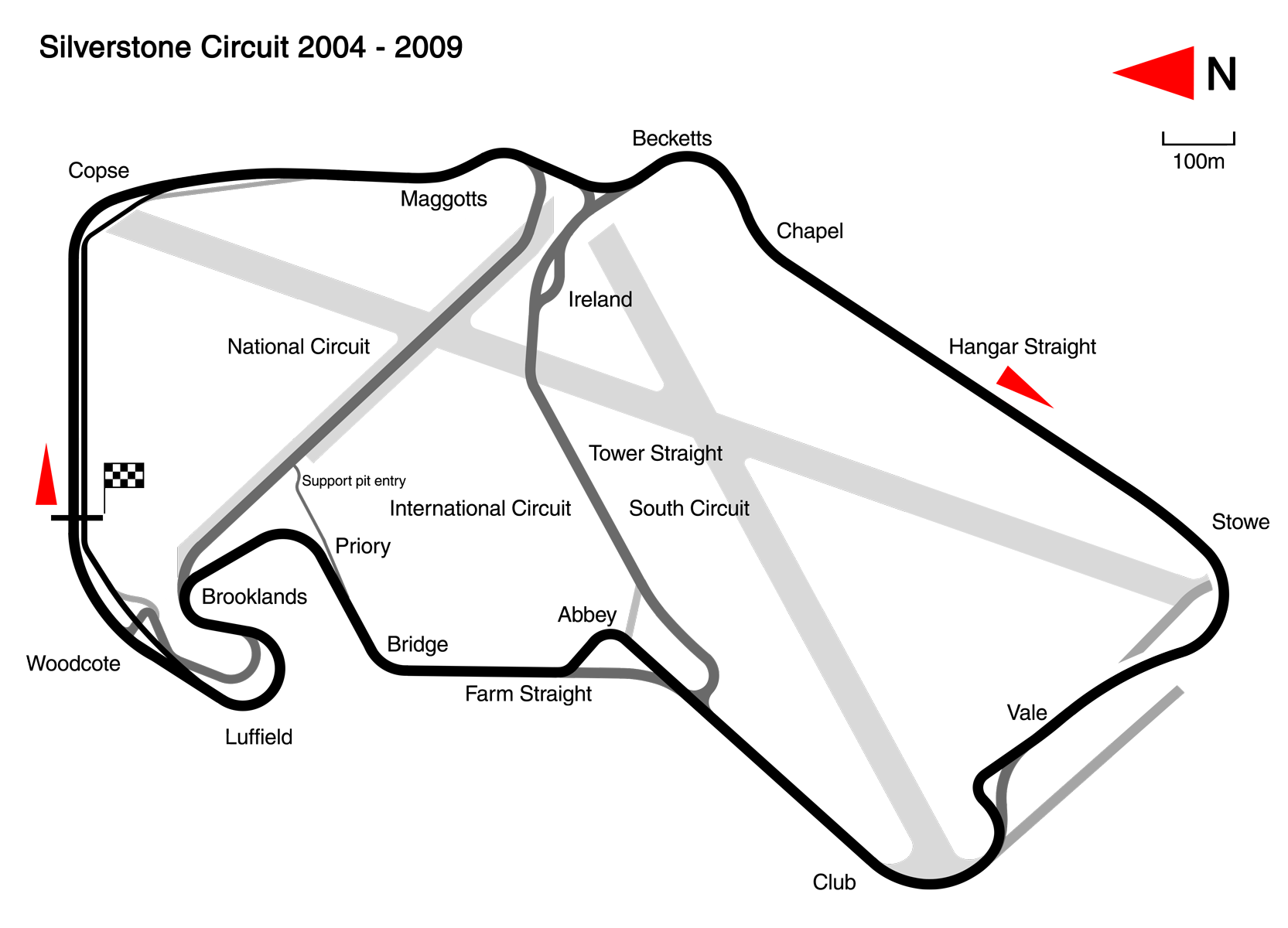
Silverstone (2005-2006)
