= 1948 British Grand Prix =

1948 RAC International Grand Prix
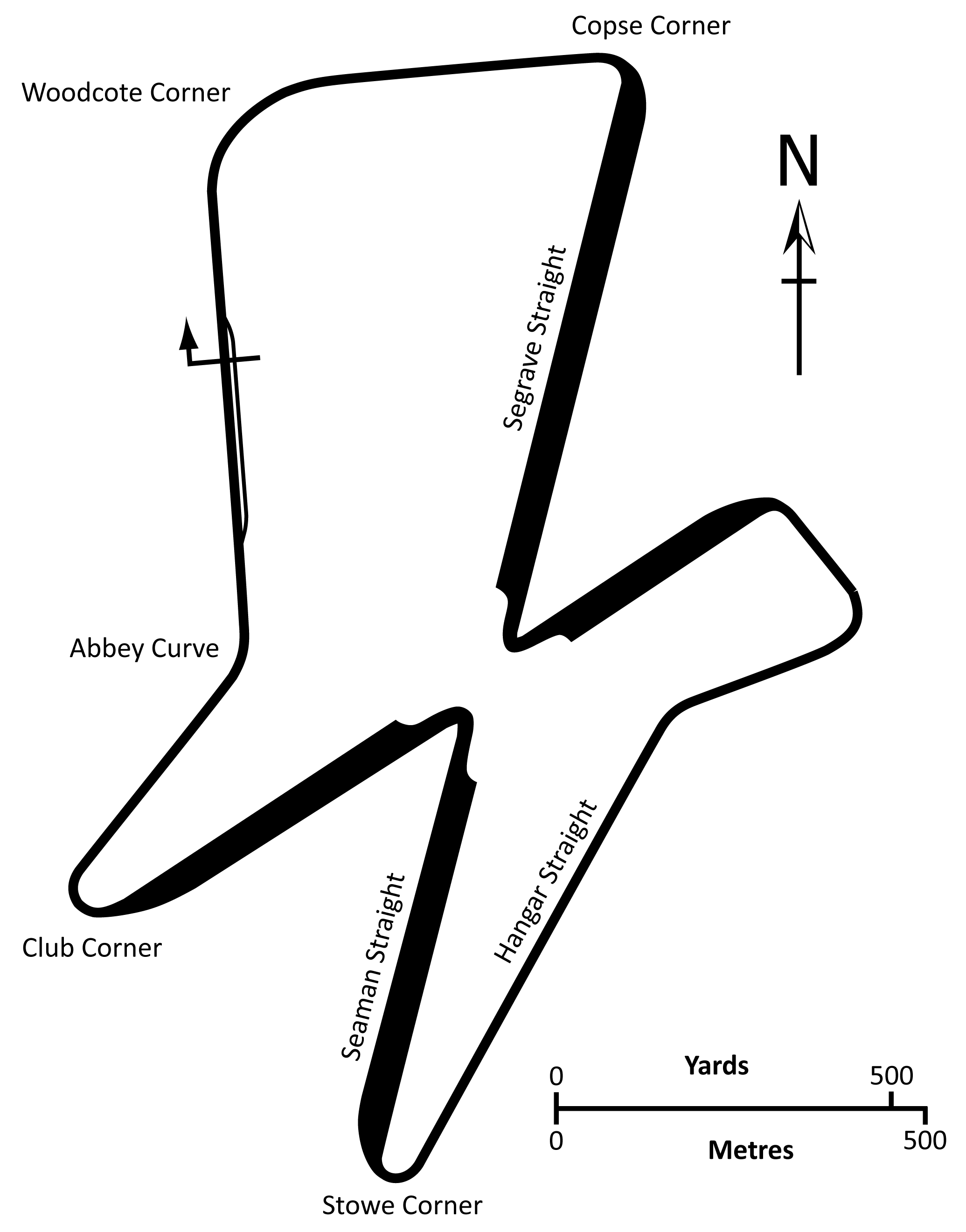

Race details
- Date: 2 October 1948
- Official name: RAC International Grand Prix
- Location: RAF Silverstone, Northamptonshire
- Course: Converted aerodrome
- Course length: 5.907 km (3.670 miles)
- Distance: 65 laps, 383.91 km (238.55 miles)
- Weather: Dry, light cloud.

Pole position
Driver	(Monaco) Louis Chiron	Talbot-Lago
- Time: 2:56.0

Fastest lap
Driver	(Italy) Luigi Villoresi	Maserati
- Time: 2:52.0

Podium
First	(Italy) Luigi Villoresi	Maserati
Second	(Italy) Alberto Ascari	Maserati
Third	(United Kingdom) Bob Gerard	ERA

The Royal Automobile Club International Grand Prix was a motor race held on 2 October 1948, at Silverstone Airfield, Northamptonshire, UK. It is commonly cited as the first British Grand Prix of the modern era.

Held two years before the inauguration of the FIA World Championship of Drivers, the 65-lap race was run under the new Formula One regulations which effectively replaced the pre-war Grand Prix motor racing standards. Winner was the Italian Luigi Villoresi, in a Maserati 4CLT/48. A 13-lap 500 cc race, preceding the Grand Prix, was won by Spike Rhiando in a Cooper. Stirling Moss failed to finish after mechanical problems.

The race meeting marked the opening of the Silverstone Circuit, although at the time the site was only on a one-year loan to the RAC from the Air Ministry, having been a bomber station during World War II.

== Background ==
The Royal Automobile Club had previously run two International Grands Prix at the banked Brooklands circuit, in Surrey, in 1926 and 1927, and the Donington Park circuit had hosted four non-ranking Grands Prix between 1935 and 1939, but with the hiatus caused by the Second World War motorsport in Britain had lost ground to continental countries. Its two major race circuits were unusable, with Donington still littered with detritus from its wartime role as a supply depot, while the Brooklands circuit had been a major centre for aircraft development during the war and much of the track had been built over. With the abundance of redundant airfields in the years following the end of hostilities, however, there were plenty of potential venues for new race circuits. One such was at RAF Silverstone, a former bomber station.

=== The circuit ===
The Royal Automobile Club took a one-year lease on the Silverstone airfield site in early 1948 and set about creating a race track. The airfield conformed to the standard model for WWII RAF sites: three long, wide runways formed a triangle, their ends joined by a narrow perimeter roadway. In this inaugural year the RAC decided to lay out a relatively long circuit, using the full lengths of the two longest runways, as well as large portions of the perimeter road.

The competitors started on the western perimeter road and headed north towards a right-hand turn, the high-speed Woodcote Corner. From there the track used the northern edge of the perimeter to a sharp right turn onto the main runway at Copse Corner. Then came the main runway, known for the race as Segrave Straight, with the track continuing to the point at which the two largest runways intersected. Here, in an attempt to better emulate a true road circuit, the course designers narrowed the track with straw bales, which funnelled the cars into a 130° left hairpin bend onto the second runway. At the end of the second runway the cars rejoined the perimeter road, just before the old Becketts Corner, before continuing on the long straight road in front of the main aircraft hangar complex, known appropriately as Hangar Straight.

At the end of the straight at what is now Stowe Corner, competitors rejoined the main runway (this southern portion now named the Seaman Straight), and headed back towards the central hairpin complex. Once again, at the intersection of the two runways the track was narrowed, before a left-hand hairpin onto the second runway, heading back out to the perimeter road. The perimeter road was rejoined at Club Corner. From this point the track once again headed north towards the finish line, passing through the flat-out Abbey Curve en route. Total track length was approximately 3.7 miles (5.9 km), substantially longer than the 2.9 miles (4.7 km) of Silverstone's classic layout, and longer even than the current 3.2-mile (5.1 km) circuit design. This was the only Grand Prix event ever held on this track layout, as from 1949 onward Silverstone circuits used only the perimeter roads. To commemorate the opening of this new circuit, all drivers completing either the Grand Prix or 500 cc race received the RAC Silverstone Plaque. Despite the interim and improvised nature of the Silverstone site, the event attracted in excess of 100,000 spectators.

=== Grand Prix entrants ===
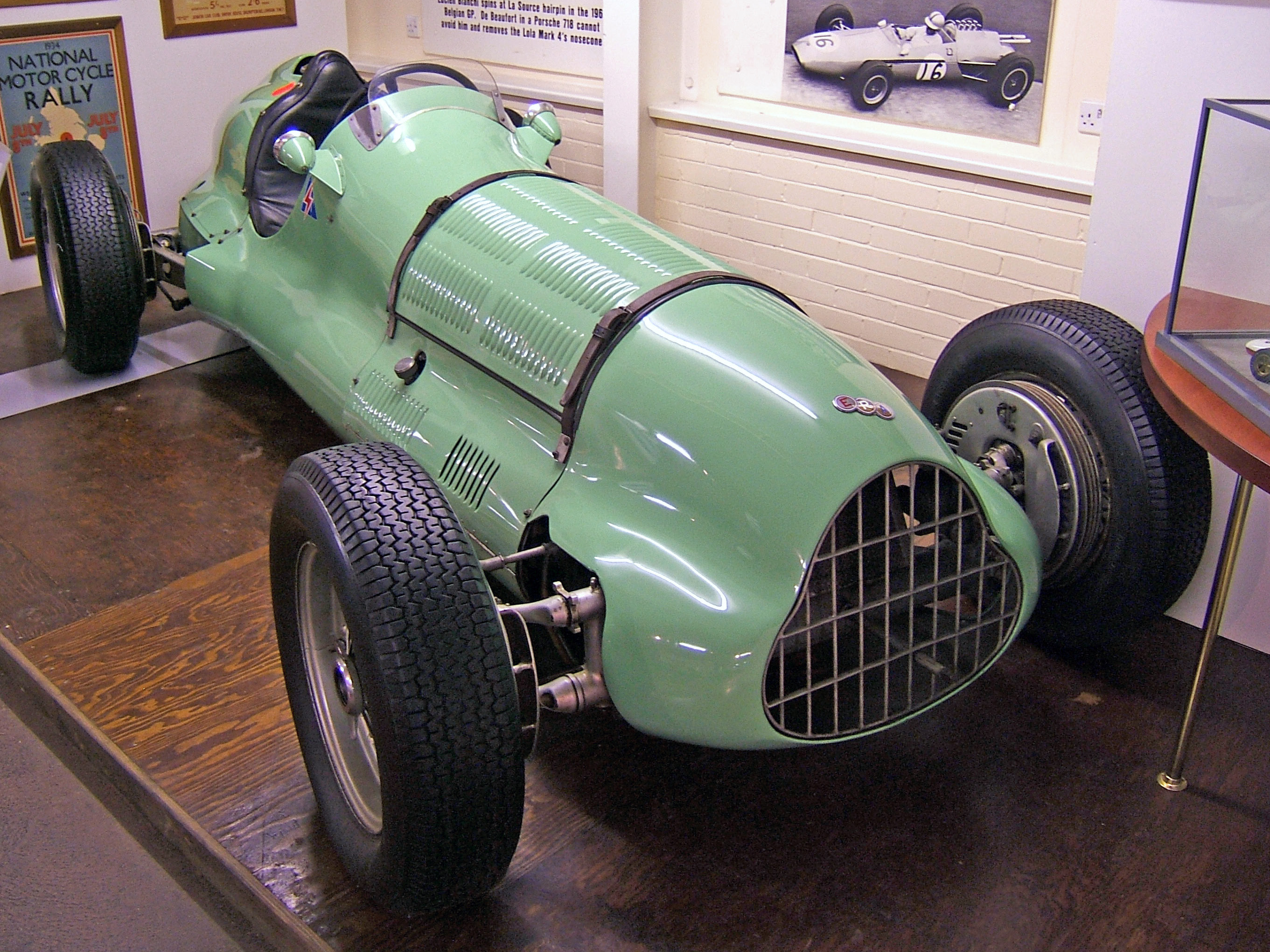
ERA E-type GP2, entered and driven by Leslie Johnson in the 1948 British Grand Prix. One of many ERA entries for the race.

The entry list for the 65-lap Grand Prix was very mixed. Brand new, full works cars were entered by Maserati, Talbot-Lago and Ferrari, while the majority of the remaining field was made up of privateer entrants, mostly running pre-war cars. The organisers were particularly pleased to have attracted entries from leading continental firm Maserati; two of their brand new 4CLT/48 Sanremo models were entered: a works car for Luigi Villoresi, and one by British privateer Reg Parnell. A third 4CLT/48 was later entered for a second factory driver, Alberto Ascari, and a fourth as a reserve in the hands of local driver Leslie Brooke. Four Talbot-Lago T26C cars were also entered, including one for pre-war star driver Louis Chiron, and a fifth held in reserve, entered by Lord Selsdon. Although Scuderia Ferrari entered two of its Ferrari 125s, the team decided at the last minute to concentrate their efforts on mainland Europe and did not arrive.

Of the older vehicles, two of the most notable were the Maserati 4CLs from the Scuderia Platé and White Mouse Stable teams. These cars were to be driven by Toulo de Graffenried and Prince Bira respectively, both previously winners of major races. The ERA marque, well represented among the local privateers, was bolstered by a factory entry from the firm's progenitor Raymond Mays. Another significant ERA entry was that of David Hampshire who drove R1A, the first ERA car to be constructed, dating from 1934. Leslie Johnson, owner of ERA in 1948, entered and drove one of the firm's 1939 E-type models. Although Peter Walker was also entered in an E-type, the car was unavailable on race day so he reverted to his own B-type, R10B.

Notable by their absence were the Alfa Romeo works team, who decided not to attend with their dominant 158 Alfetta cars. One Alfa oddity was on show, however: the 1935 Bimotore, albeit with only one of its two engines in operation, was driven by Tony Rolt, an ex-Colditz prisoner of war and the future developer of four-wheel drive.

==== Entry list ====
No	Driver	Entrant	Car	Qual.
1	(Monaco) Louis Chiron	Ecurie France	Talbot-Lago T26C	1
2	(Italy) Gianfranco Comotti	G. Comotti	Talbot-Lago T26C	11
3	(France) Louis Rosier	L. Rosier	Talbot-Lago T26C	12
4	(France) Philippe Étancelin	P. Étancelin	Talbot-Lago T26C	3
5 (r)	(United Kingdom) Lord Selsdon	Lord Selsdon	Talbot-Lago T26C	–
6	(United Kingdom) Reg Parnell	R. Parnell	Maserati 4CLT/48	7
7 (r)	(United Kingdom) Fred Ashmore	F. Ashmore	Maserati 4CL	–
8	(United Kingdom) Duncan Hamilton	D. Hamilton	Maserati 6CM	18
9	(United Kingdom) Bob Ansell	R.E. Ansell	Maserati 4CL	21
10	(France) Raymond Sommer	R. Sommer	Ferrari 125	DNA
11	(Italy) Giuseppe Farina	G. Farina	Ferrari 125	DNA
12	(United Kingdom) Raymond Mays	Raymond Mays	ERA B-Type	17
14	(United Kingdom) Peter Walker	P.D.C. Walker	ERA E-Type	8
15	(United Kingdom) Leslie Johnson	Leslie Johnson	ERA E-Type	5
16	(United Kingdom) Bob Gerard	F.R. Gerard	ERA B-Type	4
17 (r)	(United Kingdom) Gordon Watson	G. Watson	Alta 69/IS	16
18	(Italy) Luigi Villoresi	Scuderia Ambrosiana	Maserati 4CLT/48	24
19	(Thailand) B. Bira	H.R.H. Prince Chula	Maserati 4CL	6
20	(Switzerland) Emmanuel de Graffenried	E. Platé	Maserati 4CL	2
21 (r)	(United Kingdom) Anthony Baring	A.A. Baring	Maserati 6CM	–
22	(United Kingdom) Geoffrey Ansell	G. Ansell	ERA B-Type	15
23	(United Kingdom) Cuth Harrison	T.C. Harrison	ERA B-Type	10
24	(United Kingdom) David Hampshire	D.A. Hampshire	ERA A-Type	19
25 (r)	(United Kingdom) John Bolster	P.H. Bell	ERA B-Type	13
26	(United Kingdom) Sam Gilbey	S.J. Gilbey	Maserati 6CM	23
27	(United Kingdom) Roy Salvadori	Rowland Motors Ltd.	Maserati 6CM	22
28	(United Kingdom) Leslie Brooke	Alfieri Maserati	Maserati 4CLT	–
29	(United Kingdom) Tony Rolt	A.P.R. Rolt	Alfa Romeo 3.45 L	9
30 (r)	(United Kingdom) George Nixon	G. Nixon	ERA A-Type	20
31 (r)	(United Kingdom) Geoff Richardson	G. Richardson	Riley-ERA	14
32	(Republic of Ireland) Bobby Baird	R. Baird	Emeryson-Duesenberg	DNQ
(11)^{1}	(Italy) Alberto Ascari	Scuderia Ambrosiana	Maserati 4CLT/48	25

^{1}Late entry, assumed the running number of non-arrival Giuseppe Farina.
(r) Reserve entry.

== RAC 500 cc race ==
The main Grand Prix event was supported by a race for 500 cc (later to become Formula 3) cars. It was dominated by privateer Cooper entries that included future Grand Prix star Stirling Moss and John Cooper himself, both driving the new MkII. Future four-time British Hill Climb Champion Ken Wharton was also in the running, driving his self-built 500 cc special, in a strong field of well over 30 cars.

Despite the prestigious occasion – running two hours before the main Grand Prix event, the 500 cc race was actually the first ever competitive race on the Silverstone Circuit – the start was something of a shambles. When British Racing Drivers' Club President Lord Howe dropped the starting flag only two of the 34 drivers were ready to begin. Eric Brandon – an experienced 500 cc driver, and the first to win a 500 cc race in Britain – was not even seated in his car, but recovered to finish fifth. Moss had dominated the British 500 cc race season up to this point, but his car lost drive during the race and challenger Spike Rhiando won in his Cooper MkII. John Cooper was second, and the 58-year-old Baronet of Bodicote, Sir Francis Samuelson (also a Cooper MkII driver) took third.

== Grand Prix ==
=== Qualifying ===
The works Maserati 4CLTs were delayed on their way to Silverstone, and in their absence qualifying was dominated by Monegasque driver Chiron, in his Ecurie France-run Talbot-Lago. He took pole position with a time of 2:56.0, a second clear of de Graffenried's Maserati in second place. Third was the Talbot-Lago of Philippe Étancelin, a further second behind de Graffenried. Despite driving a car a decade older than those in front of him, Bob Gerard managed to put his ERA R14B into fourth position, only two-tenths of a second behind Étancelin, with Johnson's ERA E-type in fifth. Having missed official practice, the Maseratis of Villoresi and Ascari were forced to start at the back of the field, in 24th and 25th positions respectively, but in unofficial practice immediately before the race Ascari posted a lap of 2:54.6, over a second faster than Chiron's pole position time.

=== Race ===
At the start, de Graffenried got away from the line fastest, but he was passed by Chiron, Parnell and Johnson before the first corner at Woodcote. This group was followed by Bira, Étancelin and Gerard. As the leaders entered Woodcote Johnson drew level with the leader, Chiron, but at that moment the driveshaft on Johnson's ERA failed, causing its immediate retirement. Further back in the field, Salvadori went straight to his pit box from the start, to attend to an oiled spark plug. The stop cost him half a lap, and put him into last position. In the early corners Parnell was close behind Chiron, in second place, but his month-old Maserati dropped out on the first lap after a flying stone tore out the drain plug of his fuel tank.

By the end of the second lap the Maseratis of Villoresi and Ascari, showing their superior pace and benefiting from retirements, had made their way through the field and were close on Chiron's tail. On lap three both passed Chiron, and Villoresi took the lead. Later on the same lap Italian privateer Gianfranco Comotti joined the early retirees, when his Talbot's brakes failed. Another driver whose brakes fared badly was B. Bira, who dropped back into the pack because of them, after having pressed the leaders in the opening few laps. Rolt's single-engined Bimotore Alfa Romeo lost the use of that remaining motor on lap 6, and Rolt was forced to retire. Geoffrey Ansell's ERA R9B rolled on lap 23, throwing Ansell out of the car. He was unscathed.

As the race progressed de Graffenried dropped yet further back, as his engine went out of tune and started to overheat, and he eventually finished six laps behind the winners. The other early leader, Chiron, started to suffer from a lack of performance in his Talbot on lap 17, and Bira slipped ahead of him into third place. Gerard sat in fifth place, after Étancelin's engine began to overheat, which dropped him back down the field as he was forced to make successive pit stops to top up his radiator fluid, and he eventually retired on lap 22. Chiron dropped even further back after spending 45 seconds in the pits investigating the poor handling of his Talbot, and he eventually retired with a seized gearbox on lap 37. Gerard passed Bira during refuelling pit stops, his pit crew completing the task four seconds faster than Bira's. However, Louis Rosier slipped past both of them as he did not need to stop for fuel. Gerard eventually caught Rosier again on lap 52, and passed him to take third place.

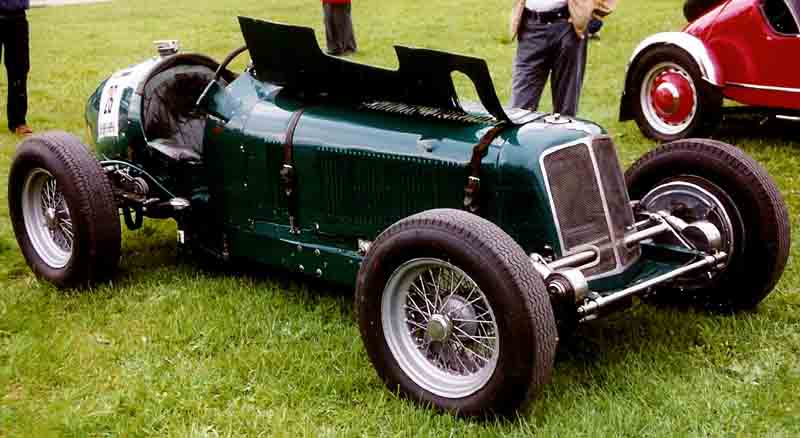
Bob Gerard's car, ERA R14B, that he drove to third place

The works Maseratis were never more than a few seconds apart, and they regularly swapped the lead between them. On laps 27 and 29, respectively, Villoresi and Ascari came into the pits to refuel. During his stop, Ascari also replaced both rear wheels of his Maserati, and the extra time taken for this stop put him 50 seconds behind his teammate, but he retained second place. He lost a further 16 seconds to Villoresi during the second round of pit stops, putting him almost a full minute behind the leader at that point. However, Villoresi, who posted the fastest lap of the race (2:52.0), suffered an unusual mishap when his tachometer's fixings failed and the unit fell out of the Maserati's dashboard. In addition to not now knowing the speed of his engine, the tachometer lodged underneath Villoresi's clutch pedal and prevented him from using the clutch for the remainder of the race. Despite this, Villoresi managed to hold on to the lead and proved the eventual winner, 14 seconds ahead of Ascari and half a lap ahead of Gerard. The only other finisher on the same lap as the leaders, but only a few seconds from being lapped, was Rosier's Talbot-Lago.

=== Classification ===
Pos	No	Driver	Manufacturer	Laps	Time/Retired
1	18	(Italy) Luigi Villoresi	Maserati	65	3:18:03.0
2	11	(Italy) Alberto Ascari	Maserati	65	+ 14.0s
3	16	(United Kingdom) Bob Gerard	ERA	65	+ 2:03.0
4	3	(France) Louis Rosier	Talbot-Lago	65	+ 4:35.6
5	19	(Thailand) B. Bira	Maserati	64	+ 1 lap
6	25	(United Kingdom) John Bolster	ERA	63	+ 2 laps
7	24	(United Kingdom) Philip Fotheringham-Parker (United Kingdom) David Hampshire	ERA	60	+ 5 laps
8	27	(United Kingdom) Roy Salvadori	Maserati	60	+ 5 laps
9	20	(Switzerland) Emmanuel de Graffenried	Maserati	59	+ 6 laps
10	30	(United Kingdom) George Nixon	ERA	58	+ 7 laps
11	14	(United Kingdom) Peter Walker	ERA	53	+ 12 laps
12	9	(United Kingdom) Bob Ansell (United Kingdom) George Bainbridge	Maserati	50	+ 15 laps
Ret	23	(United Kingdom) Cuth Harrison	ERA	47	Valve
Ret	1	(Monaco) Louis Chiron	Talbot-Lago	37	Gearbox
Ret	26	(United Kingdom) Sam Gilbey (United Kingdom) Dudley Folland	Maserati	36	Gearbox
Ret	12	(United Kingdom) Raymond Mays	ERA	35	Piston
Ret	4	(France) Philippe Étancelin	Talbot-Lago	22	Engine
Ret	22	(United Kingdom) Geoffrey Ansell (United Kingdom) Brian Shawe-Taylor	ERA	22	Crashed
Ret	31	(United Kingdom) Geoff Richardson	ERA	12	Transmission
Ret	17	(United Kingdom) Gordon Watson	Alta	8	Sheared camshaft
Ret	8	(United Kingdom) Duncan Hamilton	Maserati	8	Oil pressure
Ret	29	(United Kingdom) Tony Rolt	Alfa Romeo	6	Engine
Ret	2	(Italy) Gianfranco Comotti	Talbot-Lago	3	Brakes
Ret	15	(United Kingdom) Leslie Johnson	ERA	0	Transmission
Ret	6	(United Kingdom) Reg Parnell	Maserati	0	Split fuel tank

Grand Prix Race
Previous race: 1948 Italian Grand Prix	1948 Grand Prix season Grandes Épreuves	Next race: 1949 British Grand Prix
Previous race: 1927 British Grand Prix	British Grand Prix	Next race: 1949 British Grand Prix
