= George Nixon (racing driver) =

British racing driver and garage owner

- Born: George Reginald Nixon; 4 May 1913 Great Ponton, Lincolnshire, England
- Died: 27 June 1990 (aged 77) Crete, Greece

George Reginald Nixon (4 May 1913 – 27 June 1990) was a British racing driver, active in the 1940s and 1950s.

== Career ==
Nixon served in the Royal Warwickshire Regiment in the Second World War, and in civilian life owned a garage in Newcastle-under-Lyme. He took up motor racing, and won the 1948 Manx Cup in a modified Riley.

He bought E.R.A. R2A from Reg Parnell the following month, and used it for a number of British Formula One races in 1948 and 1949, including the 1948 and 1949 British Grands Prix. His best result was 10th in the 1948 Grand Prix, and early in 1950 he sold the car, albeit having to wait six months to find a buyer.

Nixon continued as an entrant over the next decade, having a substantial programme in sportscar racing (albeit almost entirely in Britain) in the mid-1950s, and was an eye-witness to Don Beauman's fatal accident at the 1955 Leinster Trophy, Beauman crashing having just overtaken Nixon. In 1957 he took delivery of a Cooper T43 Formula Two car, and undertook a more comprehensive series of racing at the wheel himself. By 1958 he had resorted to more one-off races, while entering the Cooper, and its marque successors, for the likes of Ian Burgess and Henry Taylor.

Nixon died while on holiday in Crete in 1990, leaving an estate worth just over £200,000.
