= Geoffrey Ansell =

Amateur racing driver (1919–1951)

- Born: Geoffrey Edward Ansell; 14 April 1919 Tamworth, Staffordshire
- Died: 19 February 1951 (aged 31) Romsey, Hampshire

Geoffrey Edward Ansell (14 April 1919 – 19 February 1951) was an amateur British racing driver and brewery director.

== Career ==
Ansell was a member of the Ansells brewing family, and after the Second World War took up motor racing, driving cousin Bob Ansell's E.R.A. R9B.

He took part in two Grands Prix, namely the 1948 and 1949 British Grands Prix, both times sharing R9B with family friend Brian Shawe-Taylor. In the former race, Ansell suffered a frightening accident in which his car barrel-rolled twice, but Ansell was thrown out and only suffered bruises. In the latter the pair finished 9th.

Ansell's greatest racing achievement was winning the 1948 British Empire Trophy on the Isle of Man in R9B, beating a strong - if all-British - field, which included 11 drivers who would go on to take part in the World Drivers' Championship. Ansell was near the front for most of the race, and inherited second from cousin Bob when the latter retired at two-thirds distance, and took the lead on the very final lap, when Reg Parnell ran out of fuel, his Maserati's auxiliary fuel pump having failed. It was only Ansell's second race.

== Personal life ==
Ansell served with the Rifle Brigade in the Second World War, and married Miss Pat Reid-Graham in 1949, which seems to have prompted his retirement from motor racing; the following year the couple had a daughter. By 1951, he was living at Roke Manor in Romsey in Hampshire, his mother's home town although he was still involved in the brewery, as well as having farming interests. He died in February 1951, at Romsey Hospital, following an operation.

== External sites ==
- F1 results
- 1948 British Grand Prix crash
