= St John Horsfall =

British motor racing driver (1910–1949)

St John Ratcliffe Stewart "Jock" Horsfall (31 July 1910 – 20 August 1949) was a British motor racing driver.

== 1920-30s ==
In his early 20s, Horsfall began competing in British club level events and he won The Motor Trophy at the MCC's Llandudno Trials in 1934, driving a Wolseley. During the late 1930s, he became a familiar and popular competitor at British and European motor races, usually driving his Aston Martin 2-litre Speed Model, nicknamed the 'Black Car', or Tony Rolt's ERA. Driving the 'Black Car', Horsfall won the 1938 Leinster Trophy race at Tallaght. In the same year the pairing took victory in the 2-litre class and finished second overall in the RAC Tourist Trophy race at Donington Park, beating the more fancied BMW works cars.

== World War II ==
During World War II he was employed as a specialist driver for the British secret service. As part of his duties he was involved in Operation Mincemeat, a famously successful disinformation plot to convince the Germans that the Allies planned to land in Greece rather than Italy. This operation was featured in the 1956 film The Man Who Never Was and the 2021 film Operation Mincemeat.

== 1940s ==
In 1945 he acquired a second Speed Model, registration EML129, which initially was comprehensively developed into a "Formula B" car running on methanol.

Returning to the track following the cessation of hostilities, Horsfall drove the 'Black Car' to victory in the 1946 Belgian Sports Car Grand Prix.

In 1948 he and co-driver Leslie Johnson won the Spa 24 Hours race, sharing a prototype Aston Martin 2-Litre Sports car. Also in 1948 he entered EML129 in the Hill Climb at Luton Hoo and posted the fastest time for an unsupercharged 2 litre car.

In 1949 he converted EML129 back into sports car specification and entered the Spa 24 hour race as a privateer. While he had Paul Frère as a co-driver (who had not driven the car at all), he chose to drive the car for the entire 24 hours single-handed. He finished the race 2nd in class and 4th overall and completed a longer distance than in the works car the year before. Many commentators have considered this to be one of his finest achievements. The car from then onwards became known as the 'Spa Special'.

== Death ==
St John Horsfall was killed in an accident while driving an ERA racing car in the 1949 BRDC International Trophy race at Silverstone Circuit. Having finished in sixth place in the first 20-lap heat, on lap 13 of the 30-lap final race he clipped a straw bale at Stowe Corner and the car rolled. Unfortunately for Horsfall, he was trapped in the car as it rolled and his resultant injuries proved fatal.

== Legacy ==
The Aston Martin Owners Club holds an annual race meeting in his memory.
