= Leslie Johnson (racing driver) =

British racing driver (1912–1959)

- Born: 22 March 1912; Walthamstow, London
- Died: 8 June 1959 (aged 47); Foxcote, Gloucestershire

Formula One World Championship career
- Nationality: British
- Active years: 1950
- Team: ERA
- Entries: 1
- Championships: 0
- Wins: 0
- Podiums: 0
- Career points: 0
- Pole positions: 0
- Fastest laps: 0
- First entry: 1950 British Grand Prix

Leslie George Johnson (22 March 1912 – 8 June 1959) was a British racing driver who competed in rallies, hill climbs, sports car races and Grand Prix races.

== Overview ==
Leslie Johnson was born in Walthamstow, at that time one of London's poorest districts, and he spent his early years there. His father, a cabinet maker, died soon after starting his own business. Johnson, left with a mother and younger brother to support even though he was still in his teens, took charge of the firm. The employees responded to his enlightened, philanthropic management with a loyalty and dedication which, allied with Johnson's astute business brain, helped create the successful furniture manufacturing business that funded his entry into motor sport.

When competition resumed after World War II he progressed from rallies to hill climbs, sports car racing and single-seaters. Although a prodigiously gifted driver who early in his career won the admiration of senior competitors such as Raymond Sommer and Louis Chiron, however, he never made a full commitment to racing. Business interests remained his primary focus. Further, as a child his heart and kidneys were damaged by nephritis and acromegaly, and deteriorating health in adulthood imposed its own constraints on his racing.

Johnson specialised in European sports car endurance events, competing in five Le Mans 24-hour races, two Spa 24-hour races and four Mille Miglias. He also took part in five Grands Prix, and broke several world speed records for production cars.

In sports car racing, Johnson achieved Aston Martin's first postwar international victory, and also the first successes for Jaguar's XK120 model in both England and America.

Johnson's business ventures included the acquisition of British racing car manufacturer English Racing Automobiles (ERA) after World War II. He also initiated and negotiated Stirling Moss's first commercial sponsorship deal, with Shell.

Among Johnson's close friends were Jaguar founder William Lyons (to whom he lent his BMW 328 for detailed mechanical investigation during the planning and design of the XK120) and Mercedes-Benz Grand Prix engineering supremo Rudolf Uhlenhaut. (Johnson used three Mercedes-Benz road cars: 300SL "gullwing," 300 "Adenauer" saloon, and 220S "ponton" saloon.)

Johnson's worsening heart condition finally forced permanent retirement from competition in 1954. He bought a farm in Gloucestershire that included three houses: one was for himself and his family, one for his farm manager, and one for his bank manager. He continued to run his Maidenhead-based company Prototype Engineering, which produced precision components for the fledgling nuclear industry. Towards the end of his life he developed a keen interest in the "Sport of Kings" and owned several racehorses.

Doug Nye recorded motor racing photographer Guy Griffiths's personal recollection of Leslie Johnson:

"[Q]uite the most charming, friendly, unassuming and courteous man in motor racing... [His] furniture factory [was] an extremely paternalistic, caring concern, in which long-term employees were looked after virtually to the grave. When they became too old for their regular work they might be put onto lighter duties for a lesser wage, but there'd always be something for them, Johnson made sure of that.

"When he acquired ERA Ltd and re-established it at Dunstable he [employed] a number of old lags from pre-war racing who were looking for a job postwar. When he drove the E-Type, I think in the Isle of Man, Reg Parnell wandered over for a chat with Johnson, and absent-mindedly gave the car's steering wheel a tweak, to discover VAAAST free-play. 'You can't race this Leslie, you'll kill yourself'. 'Oh yes, well, it takes a bit of getting used to but you know, the boys have worked so hard to get it ready I really feel I ought to give it a go...'.

"He apparently never complained, he was a very buttoned-up, stoical, philosophical chap...his final illness was very quick, and extremely painful for him, yet he never let it show [...] He was regarded as being straight as a die...a good fellow."

Johnson was married to the widow of Anglo-French driver Pierre Maréchal, and stepfather to her son Christian Maréchal, an advertising copywriter, UK ultralight aviation pioneer and freelance journalist.

Johnson died in 1959, aged 46, at Foxcote House, the family's home in the village of Foxcote, Gloucestershire, England.

== Review of competition career ==
Key: FTD fastest time of the day; DNF did not finish; DNS did not start

=== Rallies ===
Johnson’s involvement in motor sport began and ended with rallying, and he was a member of the Rootes factory teams in four Monte Carlo Rallies and one Alpine Rally. Rootes Competition Manager Norman Garrad said Johnson "knew more about the geometry of driving than anybody in the business . . . I used to sit beside Leslie and say, 'I don't give a damn who you are, you are never going to get round this one at this speed.' Thank God he always did."

Johnson's rally results included:

- 1937: Winner, Scottish Rally. Winner, Torquay Rally, BMW 328.
- 1938: 3rd, RAC Rally, BMW 328.
- 1939: 3rd, RAC Rally, BMW 328.
- 1952: 3rd, RAC Rally, Jaguar XK120. Later disqualified after a protest for running without rear spats, despite the scrutineers having noted and agreed their removal.
- 1953: Winner, Team Prize, Monte Carlo Rally, with Stirling Moss and Jack Imhof, Sunbeam-Talbot Mark IIAs. Class winner, Alpine Rally, Sunbeam Alpine Mark I.
- 1954: Winner, Team Prize, Monte Carlo Rally, with Stirling Moss and Sheila van Damm, Sunbeam-Talbot Mark IIAs. During the rally Johnson suffered a heart attack. Norman Garrad, who was in the car with Johnson and navigator John Cutts, said: "It was altogether typical of Johnson that he somehow persuaded his colleagues . . . to get to the end of the event before committing him to hospital in Monaco." He recalled that they arrived in Monte Carlo with Johnson "absolutely unconscious", and that he nearly died that night in the hospital.

=== Speed hill climbs ===
Johnson competed in numerous British speed hill climbs in 1946. Notable results included:

- First and second, Shelsley Walsh Speed Hill Climb International meeting 1 June; Talbot-Lago T150C and BMW 328. John Eason Gibson reported: "It was noticeable that Johnson was one of the select few who deliberately slid their cars into the swerves, in preference to waiting for a centrifugally inspired slide to compel them to dice a bit…the high praise poured on Johnson by Sommer and Chiron, for his driving at Brussels, has been confirmed elsewhere."
- 4th and 5th, Bugatti Owners Club Prescott Speed Hill Climb 23 June; Talbot-Lago and BMW 328.
- 2nd, Bugatti Owners Club Prescott Speed Hill Climb 28 July; Talbot-Lago.
- First, FTD and course record, Scottish Sporting Club Bo'ness Speed Hill Climb 7 September; Talbot-Lago. Achieved on his first acquaintance with the course.
- 3rd in class (to Sydney Allard's Allard), Jersey Motor Club Bouley Bay Speed Hill Climb 17 October; Talbot-Lago.

=== Racing: sports cars ===
Johnson's early races were with a BMW 328 and a Talbot-Lago T150C sports-racing car. Louis Chiron had driven the latter to victory in the 1937 Grand Prix de l'A.C.F. at Montlhéry. Johnson fitted extra fuel tanks in the tail and cockpit for long-distance racing.

- 1946: 2nd overall and fastest lap, Brussels International Sports Car Race, Spa; BMW. The Motor reported his performance as that of "a budding Dick Seaman" and added: "Sommer and Louis Chiron danced with fiendish glee as Johnson took the esses in a single controlled slide. Chiron said he had the flair of Nuvolari. Sommer, inarticulate with emotion, kissed the poor chap."
- 1948: Winner, Spa 24 Hours; prototype Aston Martin shared with St. John Horsfall. Aston Martin's first postwar victory.
- 1949:
  - 3rd, Spa 24 Hours; Aston Martin DB2, partnered by Charles Brackenbury.
  - Winner, Silverstone National Allcomers Race; Bentley 8 Litre owned by Forrest Lycett

Johnson's name is closely associated with the Jaguar XK120 model. His racing record in his white XK120, road-registered as JWK 651, made it the world's most valuable XK120 when it sold at auction for £230,000 ($350,000) in 2001.

His various successes with XK120s included the model's first-ever victories in Europe and the United States:

- 1949: Winner, Daily Express International Sports Car Race, Silverstone, the XK120's first race, after an early collision with a spinning Jowett Javelin dropped Johnson to fifth.
- 1950: Winner in class, 4th overall, Palm Beach Shores, Florida, SCCA sports car race – the XK120s first American race – despite losing the brakes. Johnson was granted an American racing licence for the event, as his entry was not sanctioned by the RAC, and the Jaguar was unmodified from standard specification. Jim McCraw wrote, "In rain and high winds, the Jaguar finished fourth in a race that included three giants of American sports-car racing – Briggs Cunningham in a Cadillac-Healey, second; Phil Walters in a Healey, fifth; and Miles Collier in a Riley-Ford, sixth. Sam Collier finished eighth in one of the XK 120s, and Bill Spear DNF'd with no brakes in the third car." The success launched Jaguar in the US market.

Johnson's Le Mans results:

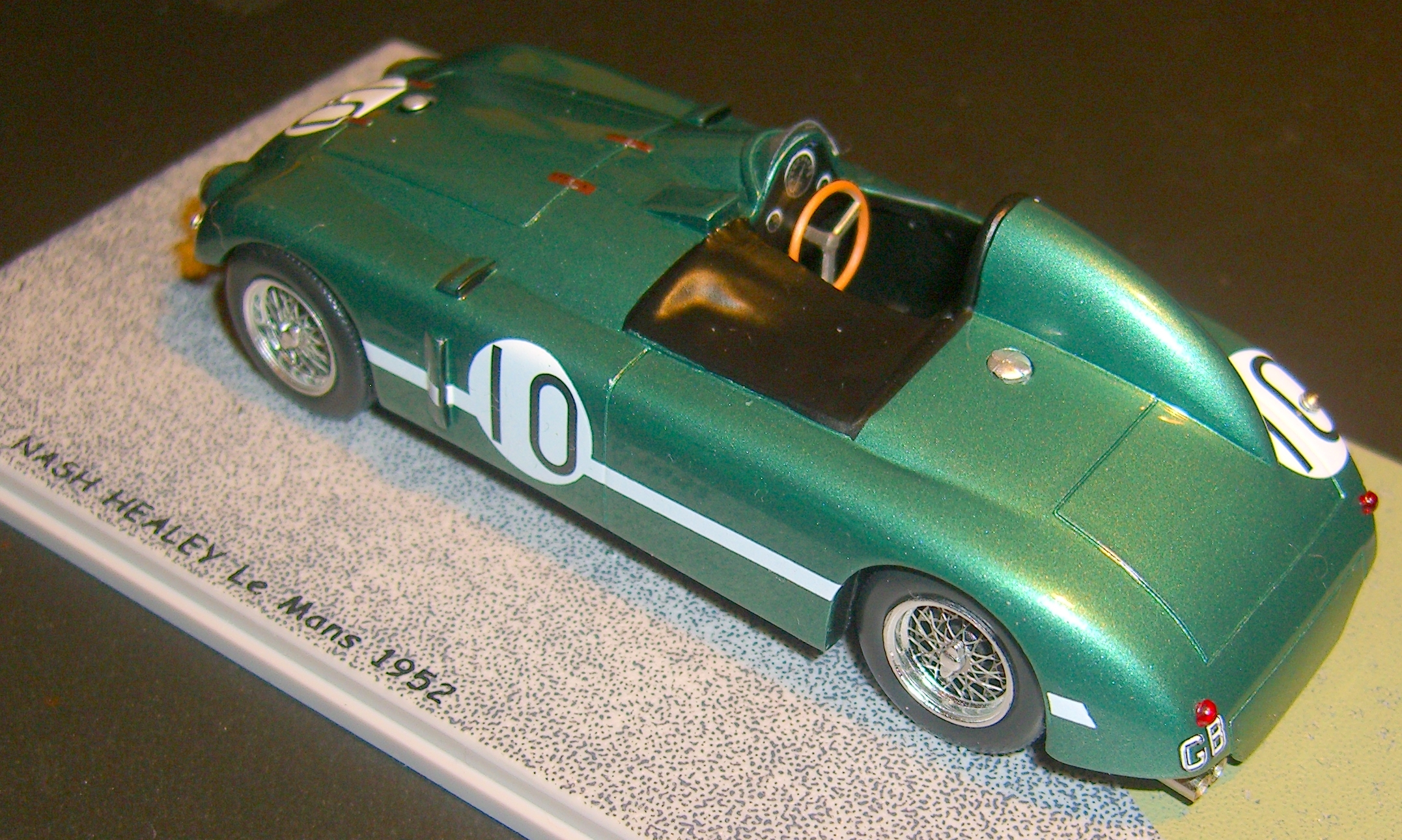
Scale model by Bizarre 1/43 (Art. BZR090) of the 1952 Nash-Healey lightweight purpose-built for the Le Mans 24-hour race. Driven by Leslie Johnson and Tommy Wisdom, it finished third.

- 1949: DNF, Aston Martin DB2, co-driver Charles Brackenbury. Retired from fifth place after six laps; overheating caused by water pump failure.
- 1950: DNF, Jaguar XK120; clutch failure after 21 hours while lying third and catching the leader at a rate that would have seen the Jaguar in the lead before the full 24 hours had elapsed—an effort that convinced William Lyons it was worth investing in success at Le Mans. Explaining the clutch failure, Jim McCraw wrote: "Leslie Johnson ran as high as second during the middle portion of the race, but, in order to save brake wear, he kept downshifting the transmission at high speeds and eventually blew the clutch, which prompted the substitution of a solid-disc clutch plate from then on."
- 1951: DNF, Jaguar C-Type, co-driver Clemente Biondetti. Retired from third place after 50 laps; no oil pressure.
- 1952: 3rd overall out of 57 starters, behind two factory-entered Mercedes-Benz W194 300SLs; first in class, ahead of triple Le Mans winner Luigi Chinetti's Ferrari; second in Index of Performance; winner, Gold Challenge Cup. Nash-Healey (a lightweight competition version hastily constructed for the race—the body was fabricated in less than a week; the entire car built from scratch in a fortnight).
- 1953: 11th out of 60 starters; Nash-Healey.

His Mille Miglia results:

- 1950: 5th, Jaguar XK120. The best-ever result by an Englishman driving a British car, in this instance a production model beaten only by lightweight competition cars entered by Alfa Romeo (Fangio's came third) and Ferrari.
- 1951: DNF, Ferrari-Jaguar "Biondetti Special" shared with his 1951 Le Mans partner and four-time Mille Miglia winner Clemente Biondetti.
- 1952: 7th to Bracco's winning works team Ferrari, the works Mercedes-Benz 300SLs of Kling and Caracciola, and three works Lancias. Lightweight competition Nash-Healey, with Daily Telegraph motoring correspondent Bill McKenzie as passenger.
- 1953: DNF, Jaguar C-Type.

=== Racing: single-seaters ===
Johnson raced Delage, Talbot-Lago and ERA cars in single-seater events between 1946 and 1950.

In August 1946, he had his first drive in a "proper" racing car, albeit one that was already 20 years old, in the Ulster Trophy at the Ballyclare circuit. The car was the supercharged straight-eight Delage previously raced by Earl Howe, Dick Seaman and Prince Bira. The clutch failed to release at the start so the car had to be pushed off the line. Having lost some 200 yards to the rest of the field, Johnson worked his way up to fourth behind Bira, Reg Parnell and Bob Gerard but a spark plug melted four laps from the end, forcing him out. He went on to attain fastest average in the subsequent handicap race with his BMW 328.

He entered three 1947 Grands Prix with his ten-year-old ex-Louis Chiron Talbot-Lago T150C – Johnson raced it both as a sports car and a single-seater, simply removing the mudguards to convert it to Grand Prix configuration. The results were:

- 6th, Jersey International Road Race. Finished ahead of several Maserati and ERA single-seaters.
- 7th, Belgian Grand Prix, Spa.
- DNF, Swiss Grand Prix, Bern. There was an almost total lack of crowd control, with the result that Achille Varzi's Alfa Romeo killed one spectator on the track in practice, and Johnson pulled out of the race after his Talbot-Lago locked a brake entering a corner and tail-swiped the spectators, killing two. The following year, Varzi suffered a fatal accident in practice for the same event.

In November 1947 Leslie Johnson acquired English Racing Automobiles, together with one of their prewar ERA E-Type single-seaters. The car was fast but fragile, and Johnson's 1948 results were disappointing despite a lap record and a fastest lap:

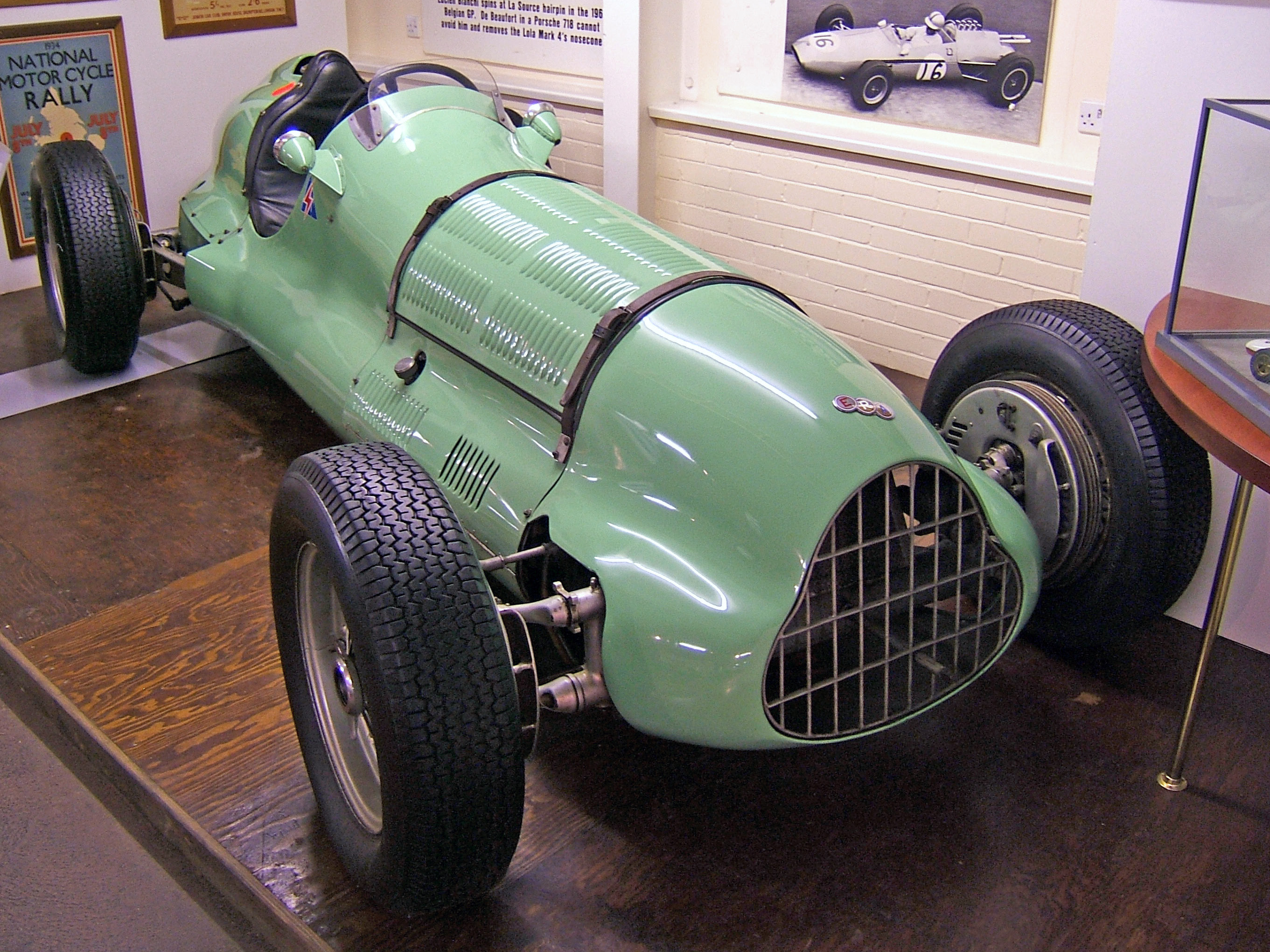
ERA E-Type GP2 driven by Leslie Johnson in the 1948 and 1950 British Grand Prix.

- DNF, Grand Prix du Salon, Montlhéry. Lap record and pole position, but the fuel tank split in the race.
- DNF, British Grand Prix, Silverstone. Autosport magazine reported that he posted fastest lap in the opening practice session, "good enough for Johnson to be a front row man, and a potential winner!" He was 5th on the starting grid. In the race, de Graffenried's Maserati 4CL was fastest off the line. Before Woodcote, the first corner, Chiron's Talbot-Lago T26C took the lead, followed by Parnell's Maserati 4CLT and Johnson's ERA. Entering Woodcote, Johnson drew level with Chiron. Then there was a "crash and a bang"' and the ERA "rolled to a standstill . . . leaving a trail of flame and smoke in its wake." A driveshaft universal joint had failed.
- 5th and fastest lap (shared with Parnell's 4CLT Maserati), British Empire Trophy.

1949 saw three promising results from five entries:

- DNF, British Grand Prix, Silverstone—Britain's first World Championship Grand Prix.
- 5th, Richmond Trophy, Goodwood.
- 3rd, Chichester Trophy.
- 3rd, British Empire Trophy, despite broken rear shock-absorbers.
- DNS, Jersey Road Race. Second fastest to Italian champion Luigi Villoresi's Maserati in practice, but engine bearing failure kept the car out of the race.

But in 1950 Johnson again found himself repeatedly sidelined by the car's unreliability:

- DNF, British Grand Prix, Silverstone. Started from the fourth row. The supercharger disintegrated after two laps and the car caught fire.

Other outings ended in steering failure and another split fuel tank.

Johnson's ambitious and technically advanced E-Type successor, the G-Type ERA, was designed to race in both Grands Prix and Formula 2. The anticipated development funds did not materialise, and the car was unsuccessful even in the hands of Stirling Moss.

In 1951 Johnson was to have driven the new 600 bhp V16 BRM in the Italian Grand Prix at Monza, but he was unable to reach the circuit in time for a pre-race test session in the very early morning. Hans Stuck took the drive but the car blew up in practice and did not race.

=== Record-breaking ===
Johnson set numerous world records with Jaguar sports cars at the Autodrome de Montlhéry, the banked oval track near Paris; most notably:

- 1950: 107.46 mph for 24 hours, including stops for fuel and tyres, in Johnson’s Jaguar XK120 roadster JWK 651; co-driver Stirling Moss. The first time a production car had averaged over 100 mph for 24 hours. Johnson and Moss, driving in three-hour shifts, covered 2579.16 miles, with a best lap of 126.2 mph.
- 1951: 131.83 miles in one hour, with a best lap of 134.43 mph; Johnson solo with the XK120. "No mean feat...driving at almost twice today's maximum (UK) speed limit into a steep turn, assaulted by the g-force induced by 30 degree banking twice every minute, using Forties technology, leaf spring suspension and narrow crossply tyres...Johnson remarked that the car felt so good it could have gone on for another week, an off-the-cuff comment that sowed the seed for another idea. Flat out for a week...
- 1952: 100.31 mph for 7 days and 7 nights; Jaguar XK120 coupé; co-drivers Stirling Moss, Bert Hadley and Jack Fairman.

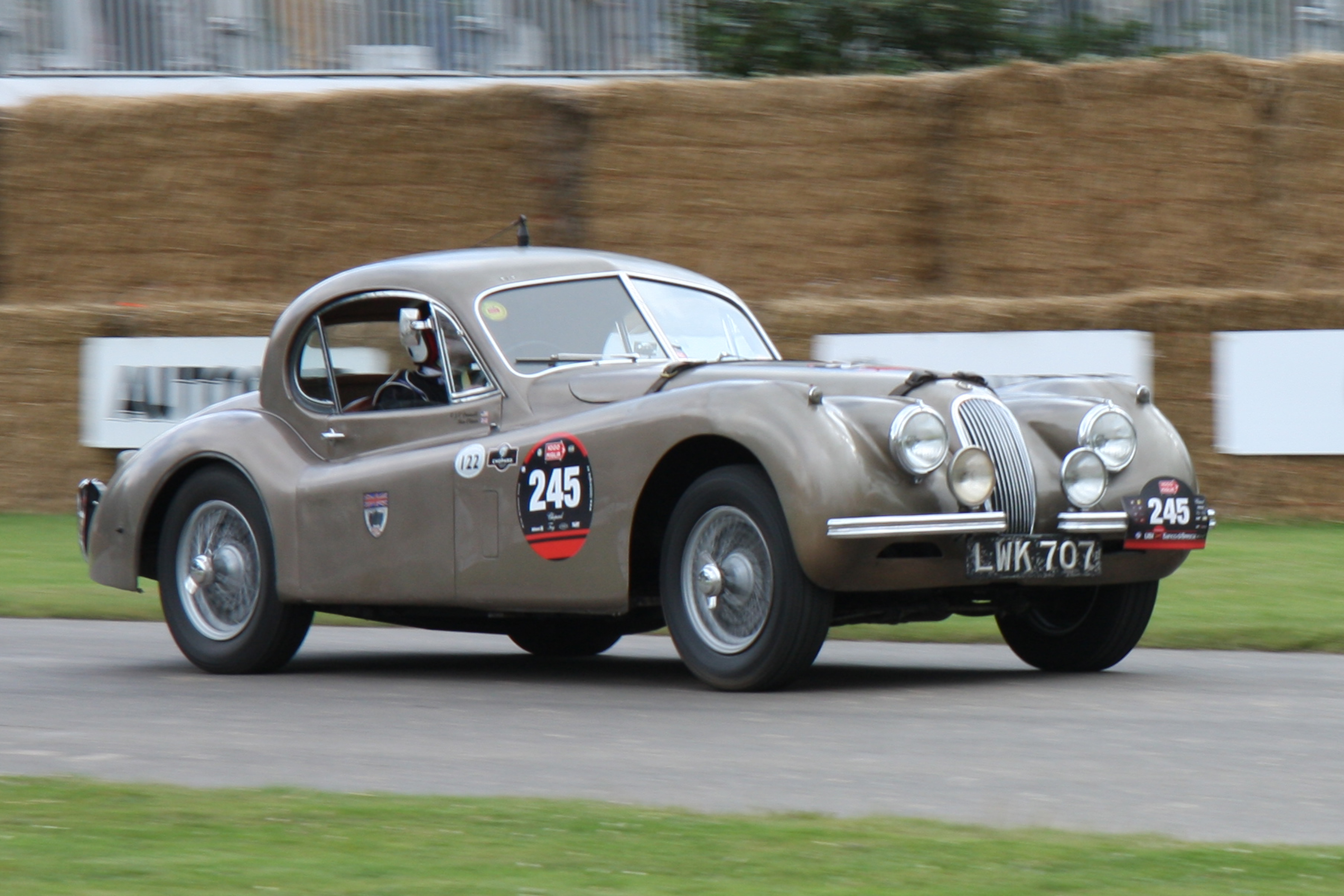
The Montlhéry Jaguar XK120 FHC, seen in 2008

For the week-long 1952 marathon, Jaguar's founder William Lyons presented Johnson with a brand new gold-coloured XK120 FHC. It was Jaguar chief engineer Walter Hassan's car, the second right-hand drive coupé made.

Moss recalled:

"...in mid-summer Leslie Johnson had another of his ideas. Having averaged 100mph for 24 hours at Montlhéry he now talked Jaguar into attempting 100mph for a week!...We again drove in three-hour spells. The speedbowl lap was under a minute at 120mph, so it was quite a strain. After each straight we hit the banking high up near the lip, then plunged off, twice every fifty seconds, night and day. In each spell we would cover about 2000 laps. It was impossible to keep one's mind occupied on a job like that. We had a two-way radio which helped keep boredom at bay. We talked all the time, called each other names, even told stories. One dare not let the mind wander, because we were running within four feet of the banking lip at around 120mph. One had to concentrate on something. I worked out how many million revs the engine made in a day, how many times the wheels turned, things like that.

The weather did not help; hot by day, cold at night. Night driving was a strain too, because we couldn't afford the drain on the battery of extra lights. The headlights had to be set very high to let us see the top of the banking when we were on it, and this meant that on the short straights we could see nothing at all because the beams were playing in the air.

We hit several hares, rabbits and birds, and Leslie swore at one point that he'd seen a huge ten-foot tall figure in a long cloak, wearing a tall pointed hat, striding toward him along the verge. Next time round the figure had gone...it worried the life out of him for the rest of his stint. In fact I had donned a Shell fuel funnel, pulled a tarpaulin around me and sat on Jack Fairman's shoulders as he strode along the verge. After Leslie had whizzed by we ran away and hid...All very childish, but good fun in the circumstances. Leslie then had an extraordinary idea to get his own back during one of my stints. I came whistling off the banking to find him sitting with Jack Fairman in the middle of the track, playing cards!

Then he took the pit signal board and put it out on the track, so that my natural line past the pits took me between it and the timekeeper's hut. He was lounging beside the hut so I waved to him as I shot through the gap. Next time round the board had been moved closer to the hut. The gap was narrower, but I couldn't leave the fast line so I shot through it again. Next time round, he'd moved the board closer still. Each lap he narrowed the gap which made me concentrate harder to pass through it. Eventually he gave in, and the board went back to its proper position, hung on the tent. At least it passed the time..."

Montlhéry's concrete surface was rough, and the Jaguar broke a spring when it was already well into the run. No spare was carried on board. Regulations stipulated that an outside replacement would make the car ineligible for any further records beyond those already achieved before the repair. Johnson drove nine hours to save the other drivers from added risk while the speed had to be maintained on the broken spring. When finally he stopped to have it replaced, the car had taken the World and Class C 72-hour records at 105.55 mph, World and Class C four-day records at 101.17 mph, Class C 10,000-kilometer record at 107.031 mph, World and Class C 15,000-kilometer records at 101.95 mph, and World and Class C 10,000-mile records at 100.65 mph. After the repair the car went on to complete the full seven days and nights, covering a total of 16,851.73 miles at an average speed of 100.31 mph.

In 1953 Rootes commissioned Johnson's company ERA to modify a Sunbeam Alpine for Stirling Moss and Sheila van Damm to drive flat-out through a flying kilometre on the Jabbeke highway in Belgium, where Moss's speed of 120.13 mph (193.33 km/h) established a new Belgian national record for cars of its class. Two days after the record runs, Johnson drove the car for an hour at an average speed of 111.2 mph (179.0 km/h) at Montlhéry, and Moss put in a lap at 116 mph (187 km/h).

=== High-speed run: 16 countries in 90 hours ===
In December 1952 Johnson, Stirling Moss, rally driver David Humphrey, and navigator John Cutts crewed a Humber Super Snipe Mark IV on a journey from Oslo, Norway, to Lisbon, Portugal—a total of 16 countries and 3,380 miles—in 3 days, 17 hours and 59 minutes. The purpose was to publicise the car, which Rootes had introduced six weeks earlier as a new model for 1953. The company's Competition Manager Norman Garrad, who had come up with the idea, hoped the trip might be completed in five days.

The team stopped only for meals, refuelling, driver changeovers, and to change a wheel after a puncture. With "heroic driving, particularly from Stirling Moss and Leslie Johnson" they finished at Lisbon 30 hours earlier than Garrad had expected, despite traffic, sheet ice, blizzards, and snowdrifts up to 18 inches deep en route. They took every opportunity to cruise at 90 mph (140 km/h)—Moss recalled that "many times" the speedometer indicated "over ninety for a quarter of an hour at a stretch"—and Johnson drove the last three hours to Lisbon at an average of 64 mph (103 km/h).

== Complete Formula One World Championship results ==
(key)

Year	Entrant	Chassis	Engine	1	2	3	4	5	6	7	WDC	Points
1950	ERA Ltd	ERA E	ERA 1.5l s/c	GBR; Ret	MON	500	SUI	BEL	FRA	ITA	NC	0
