= Fred Ashmore =

British racing driver (1907–89)

- Born: Frederick Ashmore; 6 September 1907 North Hykeham, Lincolnshire
- Died: 22 November 1989 (aged 82) Lichfield, Staffordshire

Fred Ashmore (6 September 1907 – 22 November 1989) was a British racing driver.

== Career ==
Born in Lincolnshire, the Ashmore family moved to Smethwick when Fred was a teenager, as his father was working in the horse trade. Fred, along with his brother Joe, started to race in an MG in 1935, and in 1936 Fred and Joe entered into partnership with Reg Parnell to found Highfield Garages in Derbyshire. Ashmore also ran a garage (Ashmore Auto Engineers) in West Bromwich, although he was now living on a farm near Lichfield.

Ashmore took part in many of the big races from 1947 to 1949, originally in various model E.R.A.s which Parnell and the Ashmores had accumulated during the Second World War, but from 1948 Ashmore mostly raced in Maserati 4CLTs. These were entered by Parnell, but sometimes the entry list carried under the name Scuderia Ambrosiana - Parnell and the Scuderia had mutual arrangements for ease of shipping cars, and prize money, across heavily-regulated borders. He was a reserve entrant for the 1948 British Grand Prix, but finished 6th in a 4CLT at the 1948 Penya Rhin Grand Prix. This elevated his status to the extent that he raced in three national Grands Prix in 1949 (the Swiss, British, and Belgian Grands Prix), finishing 6th at Silverstone and Spa-Francorchamps, in a CLT previously used by Alberto Ascari.

He did not take part in any Formula 1 World Championship events, his last Formula 1 appearance was at the 1951 Richmond Trophy, in Parnell's ancient ex-B. Bira B-type E.R.A., engine gremlins preventing him from starting. He retired to his Lichfield home afterwards to breed ponies horses and in 1971 sold off some land from his farm for the building of a motorcycle track.

== Personal life ==
Gerry Ashmore, who drove in Grands Prix in the 1960s, was Fred's nephew; another of Joe's sons, Chris, also raced in lower formulae. Fred was married for over 50 years and his children became champion show jumpers.
