= Bob Ansell =

Amateur racing driver (1917–2004)

- Born: Robert Edward Ansell; 18 November 1917 Sutton Coldfield, Birmingham
- Died: 13 January 2004 (aged 86) Coln St Aldwyns, Gloucestershire

Robert Edward "Bob" Ansell (18 November 1917 – 13 January 2004) was an amateur Grand Prix driver and executive in the brewing industry.

== Career ==
Ansell was from the Ansells brewing family, and in February 1938 bought E.R.A. chassis R9B from fellow Birmingham racer Denis Scribbans, replacing Scribbans' cream colour scheme with dark blue. His first race in the car was the J.C.C. International Trophy at Brooklands in May, retiring with engine troubles, but enjoyed his first triumph in it at the Prescott Speed Hill Climb in September, setting the fastest time.

He made his Grand Prix racing debut in the last such race before the Second World War, at the 1939 Swiss Grand Prix; his 6th place in the voiturette heat earned him a start in the Grand Prix proper, in which he finished 13th. He had also finished 9th in the International Trophy that year, recruiting Charles Brackenbury to share R9B, and 4th in the Nuffield Trophy at Donington, this time sharing the drive with family friend Brian Shawe-Taylor.

Ansell served in the Royal Artillery in the Second World War, and returned to race R9B in 1946, letting regular mechanic George Bainbridge use it for the 1946 Grand Prix des Nations as he himself had been prevented from going to Switzerland, but from 1947 he handed R9B over to his cousin Geoffrey Ansell and replaced it with a Maserati 4CLT which previously belonged to Reggie Tongue. He took part in two post-war Grands Prix; the 1947 Swiss Grand Prix, finishing 11th, and the 1948 British Grand Prix, sharing the car with Bainbridge, but the duo was flagged off at the time limit, running 12th and last. He practised for the 1949 British Grand Prix, but an engine failure prevented him from setting a starting time, and he scratched.

== Post-motor racing career ==
In 1950, Ansell was promoted to heading up its international trading division, and he gave up motor racing, citing unaffordable costs of over £1,000 per year; Shawe-Taylor took over R9B. After the formation of Allied Breweries, he became chairman of the Grants of St James winery, returning to the Ansells subdivision in 1969. He suffered a heart attack in 1973 and, on medical advice, retired from the brewery in October 1974; he was the last of the Ansell family to be on the company board. He died at home in 2004, aged 86.

== External sites ==
- Race list
