= Tony Rolt =

British racing driver (1918–2008)

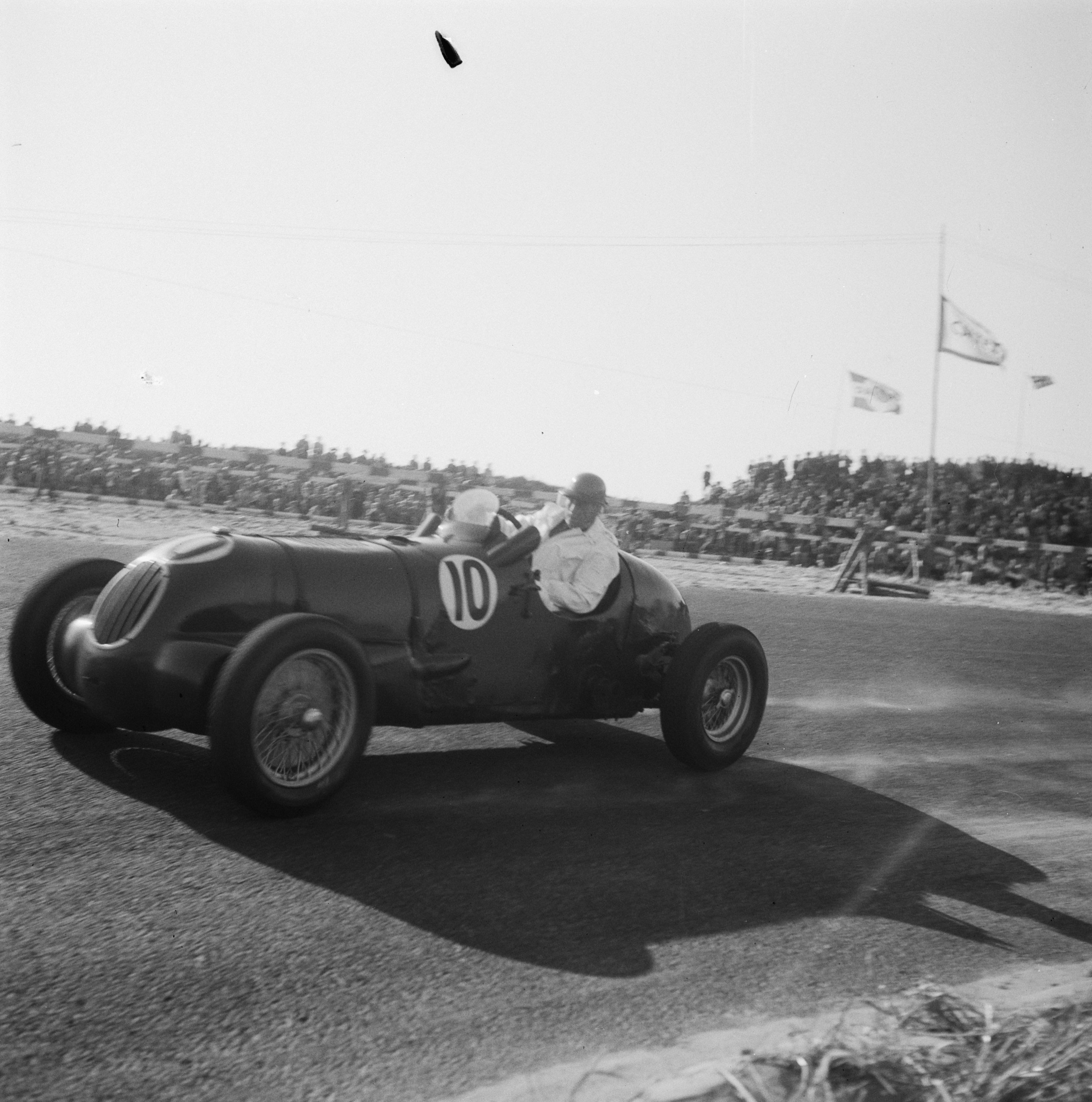
- Circuit Zandvoort, 7 August 1948. Tony Rolt in the 3.2-litre Aitken-Alfa, made by Peter Aitken (1912–47) based on an Alfa Romeo 8C bimotore
- Nationality: (United Kingdom) British
- Born: Anthony Peter Roylance Rolt; 16 October 1918 Bordon, Hampshire, England, UK
- Died: 6 February 2008 (aged 89) Warwick, Warwickshire, England, UK
Tony Rolt
Formula One World Championship career
- Active years: 1950, 1953, 1955
- Team(s): Connaught (including non-works); Non-works ERA
- Entries: 3
- Championships: 0
- Wins: 0
- Podiums: 0
- Career points: 0
- Pole positions: 0
- Fastest laps: 0
- First entry: 1950 British Grand Prix
- Last entry: 1955 British Grand Prix
24 Hours of Le Mans career
- Years: 1949–1954
- Teams: R. R. C. Walker, Nash-Healey Motors, Jaguar Cars
- Best finish: 1st (1953
- Class wins: 1 (1953)

Major Anthony Peter Roylance Rolt, MC & Bar, (16 October 1918 – 6 February 2008) was a British racing driver, soldier and engineer. A war hero, Rolt maintained a long connection with the sport, albeit behind the scenes. The Ferguson 4WD project he was involved in paid off with spectacular results, and he was involved in other engineering projects.

At his death, Rolt was the longest surviving participant of the first ever World Championship Grand Prix at Silverstone in 1950. He was one of the last prewar winners remaining too – he won the 1939 British Empire Trophy, aged just 20 in 1939 – this was after he started his career in 1935, as a 16-year-old, in a 3-wheeler Morgan in speed trials. He won the 1953 24 Hours of Le Mans and participated in three Formula One World Championship Grands Prix.

== Early life and prewar racing ==
Rolt was born in Bordon, Hampshire, and brought up at St Asaph in Denbighshire, Wales. He was the fourth child of Brigadier-General Stuart Rolt, and educated at Eton, where he got into trouble for keeping a car.

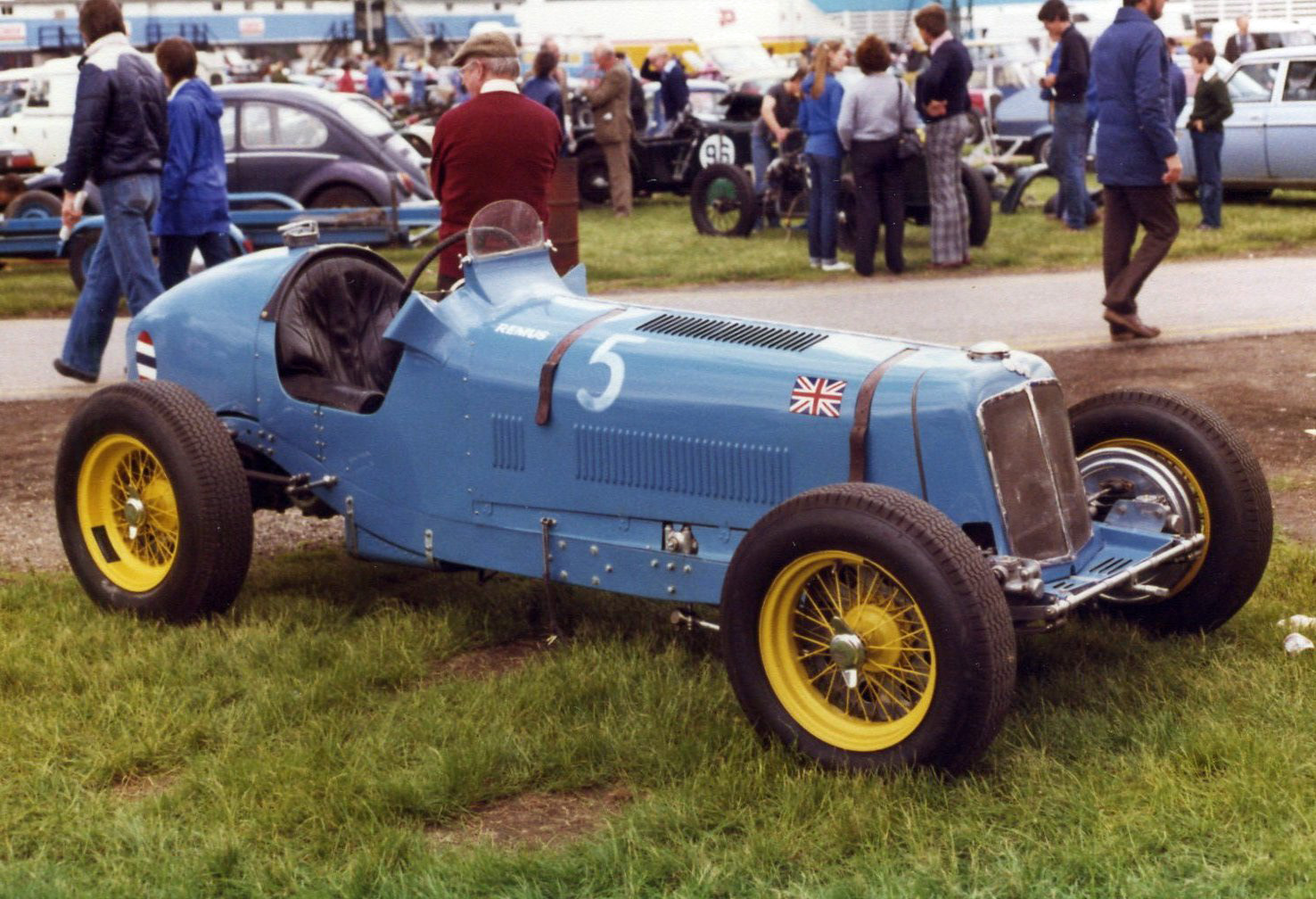
Prince Bira's ERA "Remus", which Rolt bought in 1938

Rolt began competing while at Eton, in a Morgan three-wheeler in their trials before, in 1936, making his track début sharing a Triumph Gloria Vitesse with Jack Elliott in the Spa 24 Hours, where the pair finished 11th, fourth in class. He drove there because he had just lost his British driving licence for speeding along Denbigh High Street. Throughout 1937, he raced the Triumph Dolomite, winning the Coronation Trophy, before acquiring the famous ERA Remus from his fellow Old Etonians, the Siamese princes, Chula Chakrabongse and Bira Birabongse.

In a minor race at Brooklands, a bolt dropped from the ERA’s exhaust and flames began swirling around Rolt’s lap; he removed his gloves, stuffed one across the hole and won the race. For 1939, he acquired another ERA, immediately winning the 200-mile British Empire Trophy race at Donington Park.

== Second World War ==
Rolt entered the Royal Military College, Sandhurst, and in 1939 received a commission in the Rifle Brigade. During the Second World War, Rolt was a lieutenant in the Rifle Brigade and in 1940 was sent to France, where he was in charge of a reconnaissance platoon. He was soon in the thick of the fighting and helped defend Calais. The men defending Calais held for three days trying to stop the 10th Panzer Division (Wehrmacht) from advancing, and in doing so delaying their attack on Dunkirk. He was captured and taken prisoner of war at the end of the battle for Calais, just before the Dunkirk evacuation. For his actions, he was awarded the Military Cross: his exploits included helping a wounded comrade while firing his Bren gun at the advancing German troops.

Rolt escaped seven times from German prisoner-of-war camps including Laufen (Oflag VII-C), Biberach (Oflag V-B), Posen (Stalag XXI-D), Warburg (Oflag VI-B) and Eichstätt (Oflag VII-B), before eventually being sent to the maximum security prison, Oflag IV-C in Colditz Castle on 14 July 1943. In one attempt to escape, he got within yards of the Swiss border before being recaptured – which accounted for his transfer to the East German fortress. For his determined escape attempts, Rolt was awarded a Bar to his Military Cross. In early 1944, he was one of the masterminds behind the audacious glider escape plan, but in spring 1945, the US army liberated the castle, obviating the need for it.

After the war, Rolt resigned his commission with the rank of Major to develop advanced automotive technologies.

== Racing career ==
After the war, Rolt resumed racing with an Alfa Romeo Bimotore, in which he took a fine second place in the 1948 Zandvoort GP. Between 1949 and 1952, he began a close association with Freddie Dixon and Rob Walker, setting an engineering partnership with the former and racing Walker’s 1926 Delage and Delahaye. In 1950 and 1951, he shared a Nash-Healey, with Duncan Hamilton, on both occasions, finishing fourth and sixth at Le Mans. From 1952 to 1955, Rolt raced Walker’s dark-blue Connaughts in which he was tremendously successful in English national events, winning numerous Formula Two, Formula Libre and handicap races. Unfortunately, his business obliged him to restrict his racing. Also, in 1952 came the most significant move of his racing career; he was invited to join the Jaguar team, ”I’d proved quite competitive at Dundrod where I actually lapped the C-Type faster than Stirling [Moss]. Then they asked me who I’d like as my co-driver and I said Duncan. They said "Duncan, you must be mad!” but he joined me in the team for 1952 and we always drove in long distance races together". . Their first Le Mans together for Jaguar was a disaster, which resulted in a head gasket failure and an early retirement.

== Grand Prix racer ==
Rolt competed in three Formula One World Championship races, the British Grands Prix of 1950, 1953, & 1955, but all three outings ended in retirement. At the 1950 British Grand Prix, the first-ever round of the F1 World Championship, he started tenth on the grid in an ERA that had been qualified by Peter Walker, but the gearbox failed after four laps. In the 1953 race, once again he started from tenth, but a half shaft on his Connaught failed after 70 laps. In his final Grand Prix, he again shared a drive with Walker in 1955. In what was to be the last F1 outing for both drivers: their Connaught started 14th and retired with transmission trouble after 18 laps. Stirling Moss asserts that Rolt would have been among the top GP drivers, if he raced regularly.

== Called from the Bar ==
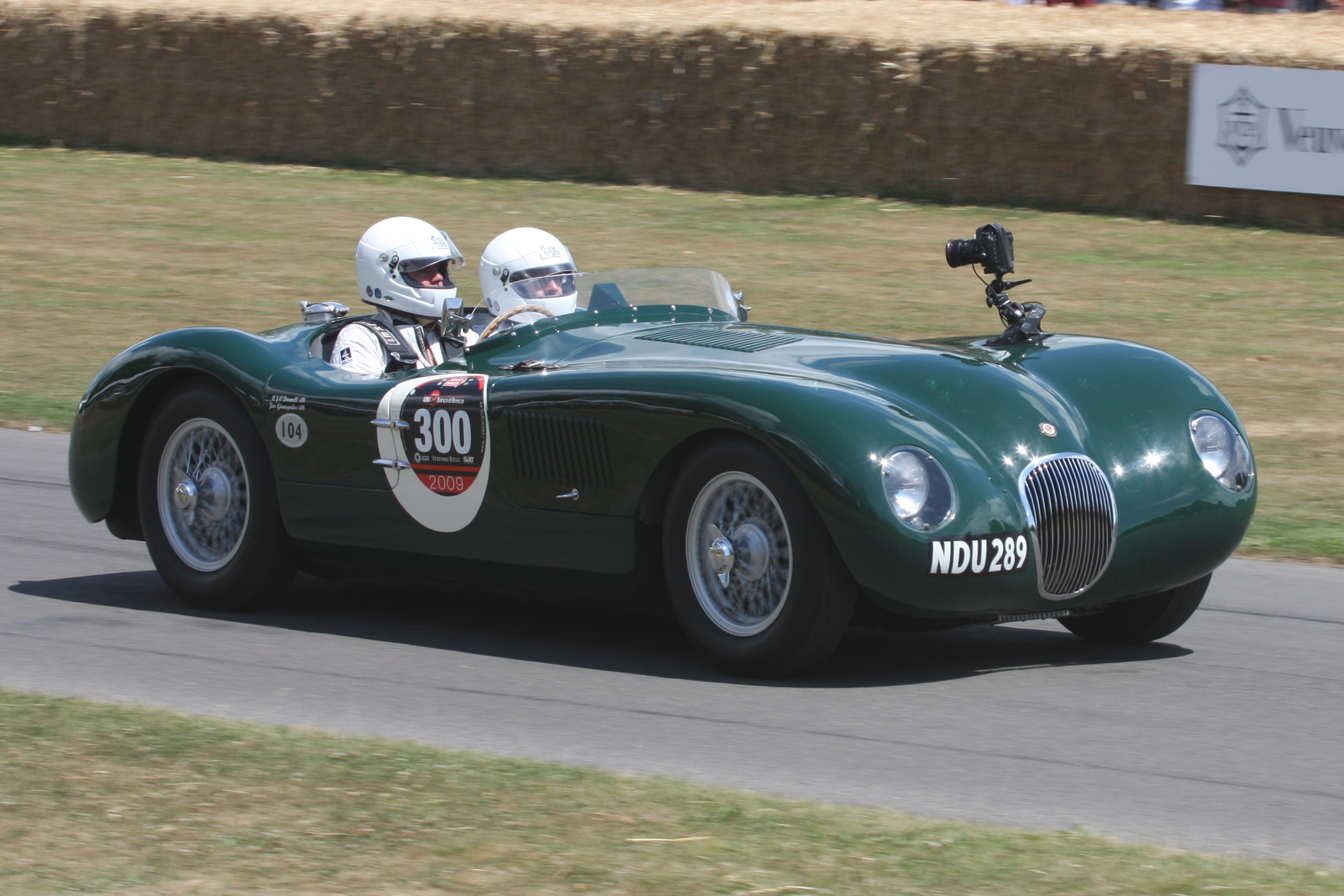
Jaguar C-Type, similar to which Rolt and Hamilton drove to victory at Le Mans

Rolt competed in every 24 Heures du Mans race from 1949 to 1955, famously winning the 1953 event in a Jaguar C-Type shared with Hamilton. Initially, the pairing were disqualified for practising in a Jaguar that had the same racing number as another on the circuit at the same time, but they were reinstated. Hamilton's account has become a motor racing legend: when Jaguar team manager Lofty England persuaded the organisers to let them race, both drivers were already drunk in a local bar. England said: ”Of course I would never have let them race under the influence. I had enough trouble when they were sober!”

The Rolt/Hamilton partnership continued in 1954, where they finished second to a works Scuderia Ferrari, in a Jaguar D-Type. This was despite an incident during a hail storm, Rolt realised that he could not see properly, so he pitted for a visor, but as a Ferrari was in its pit, the team waved him out again. When Rolt pitted again the next lap, his goggles were full of water. He hopped out of the car to fix on a visor and Hamilton jumped into the car and was away. Having made up a four-lap deficit, the Rolt/Hamilton D-Type finished less than four kilometres behind the victorious Ferrari. They also finished second for Jaguar in the 12 heures internationals – Voiture Sport Reims, but retired from the 1955 Les 24 Heures du Mans while running in second place. Rolt and his wife, Lois witnessed the disaster that year, which claimed more than 80 lives after Pierre Levegh's Mercedes left the track and ploughed into spectators. Thereafter, he concentrated on his engineering. By the end of 1956, although still a member of the Jaguar works team, Rolt retired from active racing to devote his full efforts to the Ferguson development programme.

== Engineering career ==
After the war, Rolt returned to form part of Rolt Dixon Research, with his mechanic, Freddie Dixon, to work on an idea that they had considered before the war: four-wheel drive. The company they formed also pioneered the viscous coupling. This eventually led to backing from tractor magnate Harry Ferguson and gave rise to the development of the Ferguson P99 four-wheel drive F1 car. Rolt subsequently built Indianapolis 500 track-racing 4WD cars for the American STP Corporation, and Ferguson transmissions appeared in the Lotus 56, Novi-Ferguson and STP-Paxton Turbocar Indy Cars of 1964 to 1969. With the technical director Claude Hill and the project engineer Derek Gardner, Rolt was among the unsung backroom heroes of British racing development. When Ferguson Development closed, Rolt founded FF Developments in 1971, converting cars, vans and ambulances to four-wheel drive. During the 1980s, major automotive manufacturers finally saw advantages in all-wheel drive technology, and the company became a major technology partner of Ford, Chrysler, Audi, Fiat and General Motors.

In 1994, the business was sold to Ricardo, who continued the development of "smart" transmissions using Rolt FFD and Ferguson experience. Rolt was immensely proud that the Audi sports cars that have dominated the 24 Heures du Mans and the American Le Mans Series endurance championships since 2000 used Ricardo transmissions.

=== The F1 Tractor ===
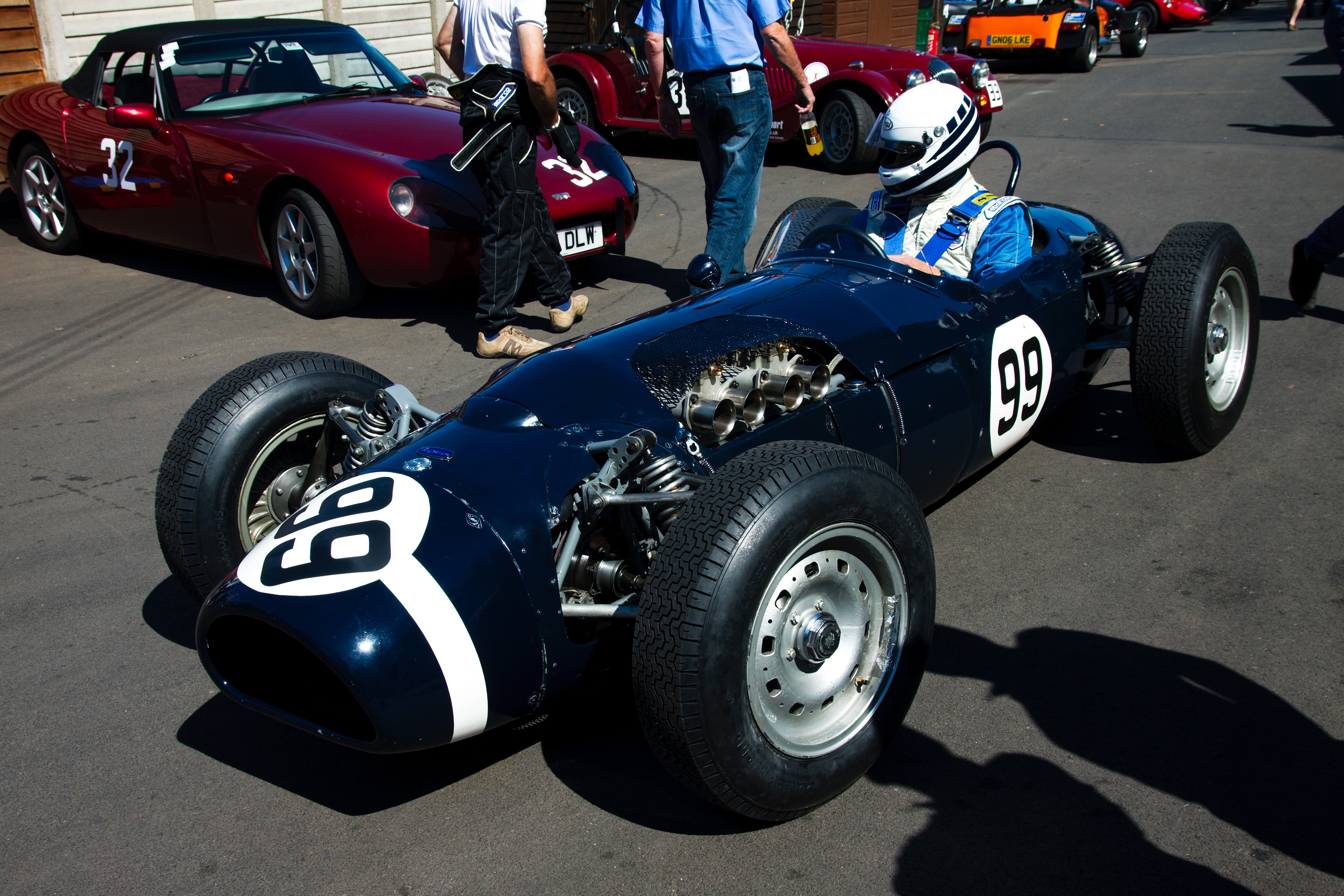
The Ferguson P99

By the early 1960s, Rolt and FF Developments had decided that it would build a 4WD racing car to demonstrate the value of four-wheel drive technology. Rolt helped to design, and also tested the Ferguson P99. Although Rolt was more than capable of driving the car fast enough for test purposes, Jack Fairman was called in to race it in the 1961 British Empire Trophy and 1961 RAC British Grand Prix at Aintree, proving without doubt the four-wheel drive allied to the Dunlop Maxaret braking system was substantially superior in the wet. The P99 was run under the banner of Rob Walker Racing and became the only 4WD car to win a Formula One race, when in the hands of Stirling Moss it won the 1961 Oulton Park Gold Cup. The car was also the last front-engined car ever to win a F1 race. Despite a trip the Tasman Series and success in the hands of Peter Westbury, when he won the British Hill Climb Championship in 1964, the car was not used much again. Subsequently the four-wheel-drive concept succeeded in the United States and in 1966 was built into the Jensen FF road car.

Rolt was a very private man, but had great charm and presence. He also had the dignity to shun personal publicity, and the notion that he had done something heroic in trying to escape from Colditz never crossed his mind. He avoided Colditz reunions. He simply saw it as his duty to make escape attempts and was quick to emphasise that there was nothing light-hearted about those efforts, and would say ”Escaping was not a game. Nor was it fun. It was a duty" . He gained much satisfaction from shooting and skiing. Lois and his daughter, Nikki, predeceased him, but he was survived by his other daughter Angela, and sons David and Stuart, the latter of whom raced Saloon cars in the 1970s and served as chairman of the British Racing Drivers' Club (BRDC).

Rolt was the last surviving driver from that inaugural World Championship Grand Prix held at Silverstone; also the last pre-World War member of the prestigious BRDC, having been elected in 1936.

== Racing record ==
=== Career highlights ===
Season	Series	Position	Team	Car
1937	Coronation Trophy	1st		Triumph Dolomite
1939	British Empire Trophy	1st		ERA B-Type
1948	Zandvoort Grand Prix	2nd		Alfa Romeo Bimotore
1951	Goodwood Trophy	3rd		Delage-ERA 15S8
	Woodcote Cup	3rd		Delage-ERA 15S8
1952	BRDC International Trophy	2nd		HWM-Alta
	Richmond Trophy	2nd	R.R.C. Walker	Delage-ERA 15S8
1953	Coronation Trophy	1st	R.R.C. Walker Racing Team	Connaught-Lea Francis A Type
	Snetterton Coronation Trophy	1st	R.R.C. Walker Racing Team	Connaught-Lea Francis A Type
	Les 24 Heures du Mans	1st	Jaguar Cars Ltd.	Jaguar C-Type
	Crystal Palace Trophy	1st	R.R.C. Walker Racing Team	Connaught-Lea Francis A Type
	United States Air Force Trophy	1st	R.R.C. Walker Racing Team	Connaught-Lea Francis A Type
	Bristol MC & LCC Trophy	1st	R.R.C. Walker Racing Team	Connaught-Lea Francis A Type
	Mid-Cheshire MC Formula 2 Race	1st	R.R.C. Walker Racing Team	Connaught-Lea Francis A Type
	Chichester Cup	2nd		Delage-ERA 15S8
	London Trophy	2nd	R.R.C. Walker Racing Team	Connaught-Lea Francis A Type
	Lavant Cup	3rd	R.R.C. Walker Racing Team	Connaught-Lea Francis A Type
	AMOC Trophy	3rd	R.R.C. Walker Racing Team	Connaught-Lea Francis A Type
	BRDC International Trophy	3rd	R.R.C. Walker Racing Team	Connaught-Lea Francis A Type
	Madgwick Cup	3rd	R.R.C. Walker Racing Team	Connaught-Lea Francis A Type
1954	Les 24 Heures du Mans	2nd	Jaguar Cars Ltd.	Jaguar D-Type
	12 heures internationals – Voiture Sport Reims	2nd	Jaguar Cars Ltd.	Jaguar D-Type
	August Bank Holiday Cup	3rd	R.R.C. Walker Racing Team	Connaught-Lea Francis A Type
1955	Silverstone International	3rd	Jaguar Cars Ltd.	Jaguar D-Type

=== Complete Formula One World Championship results ===
(key)

Year	Entrant	Chassis	Engine	1	2	3	4	5	6	7	8	9	WDC	Points
1950	Peter Walker	ERA E-Type	ERA Straight-6	GBR; Ret*	MON	500	SUI	BEL	FRA	ITA			NC	0
1953	RRC Walker Racing Team	Connaught A Type	Connaught Straight-4	ARG	500	NED	BEL	FRA	GBR; Ret	GER	SUI	ITA	NC	0
1955	Connaught Engineering	Connaught B Type	Connaught Straight-4	ARG	MON	500	BEL	NED	GBR; Ret*	ITA			NC	0

* Indicates shared drive with Peter Walker

=== Complete 24 Hours of Le Mans results ===
Year	Team	Co-Drivers	Car	Class	Laps	Pos.	Class Pos.
1949	(United Kingdom) R.R.C. Walker	(United Kingdom) Guy Jason Henry	Delahaye 135CS	S5.0	126	DNF (Bearings)	
1950	(United Kingdom) Healey Motors Ltd.	(United Kingdom) Duncan Hamilton	Nash-Healey E	S5.0	250	4th	3rd
1951	(United Kingdom) Healey	(United Kingdom) Duncan Hamilton	Nash-Healey Coupé	S5.0	250	6th	4th
1952	(United Kingdom) Jaguar Ltd.	(United Kingdom) Duncan Hamilton	Jaguar C-Type	S5.0		DNF (Head gasket)	
1953	(United Kingdom) Jaguar Cars Ltd.	(United Kingdom) Duncan Hamilton	Jaguar C-Type	S5.0	304	1st	1st
1954	(United Kingdom) Jaguar Cars Ltd.	(United Kingdom) Duncan Hamilton	Jaguar D-Type	S5.0	301	2nd	2nd
1955	(United Kingdom) Jaguar Cars Ltd.	(United Kingdom) Duncan Hamilton	Jaguar D-Type	S5.0	186	DNF (Gearbox)	

=== Complete Mille Miglia results ===
Year	Team	Co-Drivers	Car	Class	Pos.	Class Pos.
1953	(United Kingdom) Bill Cannell /Jaguar Cars Ltd.	(United Kingdom) Len Hayden	Jaguar C-Type	S+2.0	DNF (Engine)	

=== Complete Spa 24 Hours results ===
Year	Team	Co-Drivers	Car	Class	Laps	Pos.	Class Pos.
1936		(United Kingdom) Jack Elliott	Triumph Gloria Vitesse	2.0		11th	4th
1948	(United Kingdom) Jock Horsfall	(Belgium) André Pilette	Aston Martin Speed Model	S2.0		DNF (Split fuel tank)	

=== Complete 12 Hours of Reims results ===
Year	Team	Co-Drivers	Car	Class	Laps	Pos.	Class Pos.
1954	(United Kingdom) Jaguar Cars Ltd.	(United Kingdom) Duncan Hamilton	Jaguar D-Type		214	2nd	2nd

=== Complete 12 Hours of Donington results ===
Year	Team	Co-Drivers	Car	Class	Pos.	Class Pos.
1937	(United Kingdom) J. Elliott	(United Kingdom) J. Elliott	Triumph		DNF (Engine)	

=== Complete 12 Hours of Paris results ===
Year	Team	Co-Drivers	Car	Class	Pos.	Class Pos.
1948		(United Kingdom) John Heath	Alta	2.0	DNF	

Sporting positions
Preceded by Hermann Lang; Fritz Riess	Winner of the 24 Hours of Le Mans; 1953; With: Duncan Hamilton	Succeeded by José Froilán González; Maurice Trintignant
Preceded by Charles Dobson; 1938	British Empire Trophy; 1939	Succeeded by Bob Gerard; 1947
