= Bob Gerard =

British racing driver (1914–1990)

- Born: 19 January 1914; Leicester, England
- Died: 26 January 1990 (aged 76); South Croxton, Leicestershire, England

Formula One World Championship career
- Nationality: (United Kingdom) British
- Active years: 1950 – 1951, 1953 – 1954, 1956 – 1957
- Team(s): Privateer ERA and Cooper
- Entries: 8
- Championships: 0
- Wins: 0
- Podiums: 0
- Career points: 0
- Pole positions: 0
- Fastest laps: 0
- First entry: 1950 British Grand Prix
- Last entry: 1957 British Grand Prix

24 Hours of Le Mans career
- Years: 1953
- Teams: Frazer Nash
- Best finish: dnf
- Class wins: 0

Frederick Roberts Gerard (19 January 1914 – 26 January 1990) was a racing driver and businessman from England. He participated in numerous top-level motor racing events on either side of World War II, including eight World Championship Formula One Grands Prix, scoring no championship points.

== Early career ==
Gerard was born in 1914 in Leicester into a family well acquainted with mechanical transport. His family's business was Parr's Ltd., initially a bicycle manufacturer who, like many others such as Triumph, moved into the newly evolving motor vehicle market at the turn of the 20th century. Parr's, though, was far from a high-performance firm, concentrating mostly on haulage.

However, as daily transport his father favoured the sporting Riley brand, and it was with a Riley Nine that Gerard made his first foray into motorsport in the 1933 MCC Land's End trial. Success came immediately, and in this first event Gerard not only completed the demanding course (in itself a significant achievement) but did so in sufficient style to earn himself a Premier Award. This despite him being severely near-sighted.

Throughout the remainder of the 1930s, Gerard continued to compete in trials and sprint races, and after purchasing a 1½ litre Riley Sprite he also began to participate in circuit racing. Early club races at his East Midlands home circuit Donington Park continued his success, with Gerard taking two victories over cars with much larger engines, as well as ninth in the prestigious Donington TT race. In between running the family business, Gerard continued to compete at Donington as often as he could, driving in the Nuffield Trophy in 1938 and 1939, although without success. With war looming, in 1939 he also took the little Riley down to the Brooklands circuit in Surrey. At that year's Opening Meeting he took a highly creditable third place, and won a Campbell circuit handicap race later in the year.

== Post-war racing career ==
Towards the end of the war, Gerard purchased his first true racing car, paying Reg Parnell £1000 for ERA R4A. Using his engineering background and immaculate attention to detail, and by cannibalising sister car R6B for spares, Gerard managed to get R4A running in time for the Cockfosters demonstration in mid-1945. At the same run Gerard's wife, Joan, also demonstrated the old Riley Sprite.

Prior to the 1946 season, Gerard decided to equip himself with a more potent mount. While both Bob and Joan Gerard continued to use R4A for a string of hillclimbing and sprint victories, newly purchased ERA R14B was rebuilt and modified for circuit racing. Gerard's major changes to the pre-war design were to fit a preselector gearbox and to change the Zoller-type supercharger for a smaller, but more efficient Murray-Jamieson design. He also later changed the car's outward appearance, switching the old-fashioned upright radiator to one with a far more raked cowl, lowering the bonnet line to accommodate this.

Over the next five years, Gerard used R14B to great effect. He scored three consecutive victories in the Empire Trophy and two victories in the Jersey Road Race between 1947 and 1949, as well as regularly finishing in the top ten in many international standard events. In the first British Grand Prix, in 1948, Gerard drove the decade-old R14B to third place, beaten only by the brand new works' Maserati 4CLT/48s of Italian greats Luigi Villoresi and Alberto Ascari. The following year he went one better, taking second, again to a Maserati, this time driven by Swiss ace Toulo de Graffenried. His two wins and a Grand Prix second placing, along with seventh in the 1949 International Trophy race at Silverstone, earned Gerard the British Racing Drivers' Club's prestigious Gold Star award for 1949.

Gerard continued to campaign R14B for the first year of the new FIA World Championship in 1950. Despite the ever-increasing age gap between his car and the majority of the rest of the field, Bob Gerard's meticulous preparation of his cars, and his emphasis on increasing their reliability, meant that he often finished a race much higher in the placings than expected.

At the very first World Championship event, the 1950 British Grand Prix, the Gerard-R14B pairing only narrowly missed out on the points, finishing in sixth place, despite having started as low as 13th on the grid. He also finished in sixth in R4A at the Monaco event later in the season, this time from 16th at the start.

However, the rapid evolution of racing machinery, inspired by the rewards offered from the Championship, meant that for 1952 Gerard would have to abandon his old ERA in favour of something more modern. Retaining a degree of patriotism, Gerard bought a Cooper T23-Bristol, which he would continue to use for both Championship and non-Championship races until 1957 when he upgraded to the new, mid-engined T43 chassis.

While he only twice finished in the top ten in Championship races in his Coopers – in 1954 and in his final Championship event at the 1957 British Grand Prix – Gerard remained a force in UK national level race events. During the 1950s, he won many races, at most British circuits, and was a widely respected competitor.

Gerard's achievements were honoured by the owners of the Mallory Park track, in his native Leicestershire, when they named the circuit's most prominent bend Gerard's. Gerard himself continued to race into the 1960s, in a Turner sports car, and used his preparation expertise for the benefit of other drivers by acting as entrant for many promising newcomers right into the 1980s.

== Death ==
Gerard died in 1990, one week after his 76th birthday, in South Croxton, Leicestershire.

== Career results ==
=== Complete Formula One World Championship results ===
(key)

| Year | Entrant | Chassis | Engine | 1 | 2 | 3 | 4 | 5 | 6 | 7 | 8 | 9 | WDC | Pts |
|---|---|---|---|---|---|---|---|---|---|---|---|---|---|---|
| 1950 | Bob Gerard | ERA B | ERA 1.5 L6s | GBR; 6 | | | | | | | | | NC | 0 |
| 1950 | Bob Gerard | ERA A | ERA 1.5 L6s | | MON; 6 | 500 | SUI | BEL | FRA | ITA | | | NC | 0 |
| 1951 | Bob Gerard | ERA B | ERA 1.5 L6s | SUI | 500 | BEL | FRA | GBR; 11 | GER | ITA | ESP | | NC | 0 |
| 1953 | Bob Gerard | Cooper T23 | Bristol BS1 2.0 L6 | ARG | 500 | NED | BEL | FRA; 11 | GBR; Ret | GER | SUI | ITA | NC | 0 |
| 1954 | Bob Gerard | Cooper T23 | Bristol BS1 2.0 L6 | ARG | 500 | BEL | FRA | GBR; 10 | GER | SUI | ITA | ESP | NC | 0 |
| 1956 | Bob Gerard | Cooper T23 | Bristol BS1 2.0 L6 | ARG | MON | 500 | BEL | FRA | GBR; 11 | GER | ITA | | NC | 0 |
| 1957 | Bob Gerard | Cooper T44 | Bristol BS2 2.2 L6 | ARG | MON | 500 | FRA | GBR; 6 | GER | PES | ITA | | NC | 0 |

=== Complete British Saloon Car Championship results ===
(key) (Races in bold indicate pole position; races in italics indicate fastest lap.)

| Year | Team | Car | Class | 1 | 2 | 3 | 4 | 5 | 6 | 7 | 8 | 9 | DC | Pts | Class |
|---|---|---|---|---|---|---|---|---|---|---|---|---|---|---|---|
| 1958 | Bob Gerard | Austin A35 | A | BRH | BRH | MAL; 3† | BRH | BRH | CRY | BRH | BRH | BRH | ? | ? | ? |
| 1959 | Alexander Engineering Co. | Austin A35 | A | GOO | AIN | SIL; Ret | CRY | SNE ? | BRH | BRH | | | ? | ? | ? |

† Events with 2 races staged for the different classes.

== Sources ==
- Boddy, Bill (January 1999). "Privateer on Parade". Motor Sport magazine archive. p. 68.
- "Driver: Bob Gerard". ChicaneF1.com.
- "Drivers: Bob Gerard". GrandPrix.com.
- "Bob Gerard". Grand Prix Racing – the whole story. Archived from the original on 9 December 2007.
- Bob Gerard profile at The 500 Owners Association
