= 1949 BRDC International Trophy =

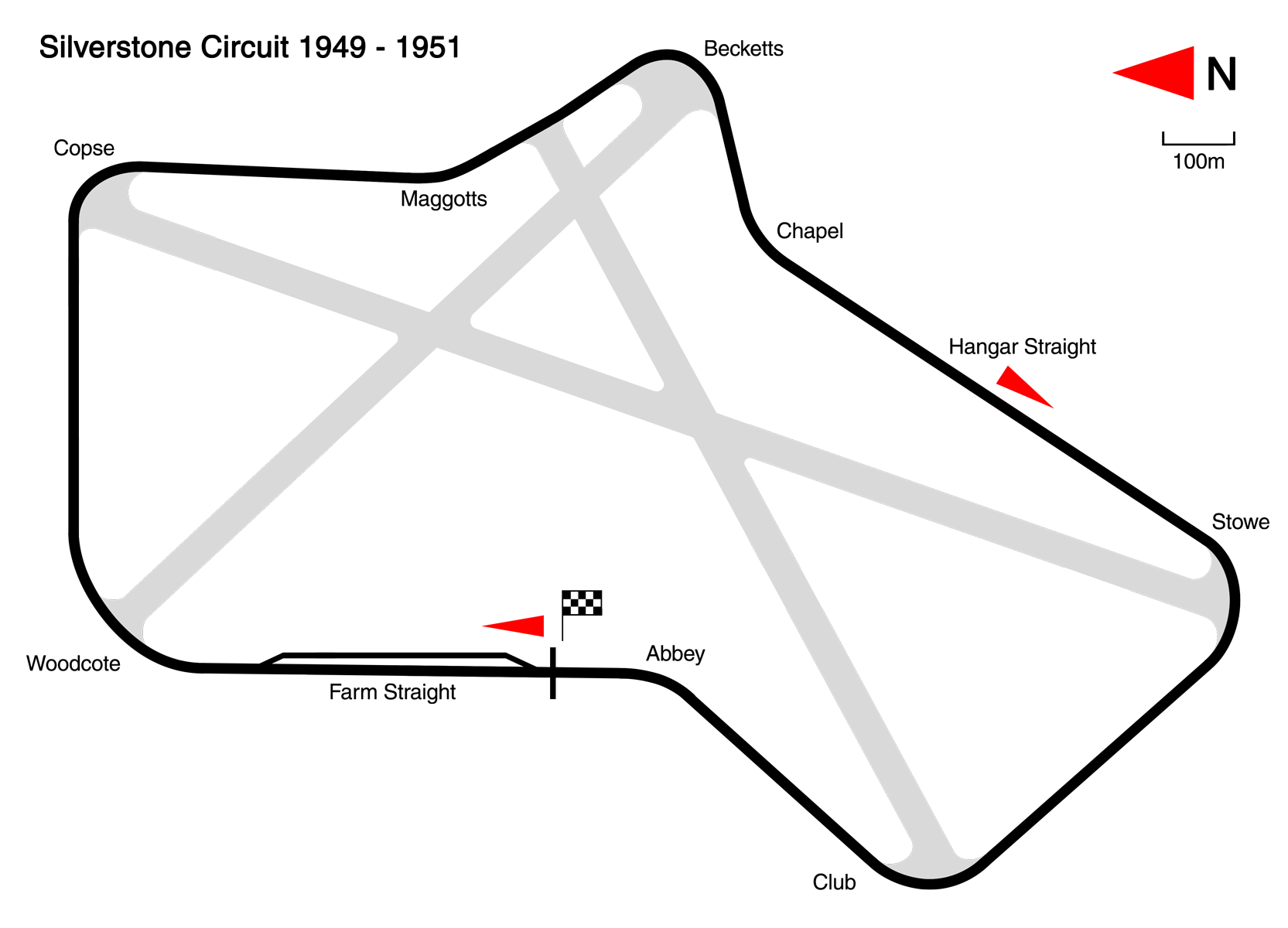

Race details
- Date: 20 August 1949
- Official name: Daily Express International Trophy
- Location: Silverstone Circuit, Northamptonshire
- Course: Permanent racing facility
- Course length: 4.649 km (2.889 miles)

Pole position
Driver	(Italy) Alberto Ascari (Heat 1) (Switzerland) Emmanuel de Graffenried (Heat 2)	Ferrari; Maserati
- Time: 1:56.0 (Heat 1); 1:55.0 (Heat 2)

Podium
First	(Italy) Alberto Ascari	Ferrari
Second	(Italy) Giuseppe Farina	Ferrari
Third	(Italy) Luigi Villoresi	Ferrari

The first BRDC International Trophy meeting, formally titled the Daily Express International Trophy, was held on 20 August 1949 at the Silverstone Circuit, England. It was the first race meeting to only use the former airfield's perimeter roadways, rather than the main runways. The event was held over two heats of 20 laps and one final of 30 laps of the Grand Prix circuit. The final was won by Italian Alberto Ascari, who would go on to win the World Championship of Drivers twice. In addition to the main Formula One-regulation competition, the meeting also contained events for 500 cc racing cars and production cars. The race meeting was attended by over 100,000 people, but was marred by the death of St. John Horsfall in an accident on the 13th lap of the final race.

== Results ==
=== Final ===
Pos	Driver	Chassis	Time/Retired
1	(Italy) Alberto Ascari	Ferrari 125	59:42.6
2	(Italy) Giuseppe Farina	Maserati 4CLT/48	+ 1.8 s
3	(Italy) Luigi Villoresi	Ferrari 125	+ 36.4 s
4	(Switzerland) Emmanuel de Graffenried	Maserati 4CLT	+ 36.4 s
5	(United Kingdom) Peter Walker	ERA E-type	+ 1:24.2
6	(Thailand) B. Bira	Maserati 4CLT	+ 2:15.8
7	(United Kingdom) Bob Gerard	ERA B-type	+ 1 lap
8	(United Kingdom) Fred Ashmore	Maserati 4CLT	+ 1 lap
9	(United Kingdom) Cuth Harrison	ERA B-type	+ 2 laps
10	(United Kingdom) Tony Rolt	Alfa Romeo Aitken	+ 2 laps
11	(United Kingdom) David Hampshire	ERA C-type	+ 2 laps
12	(Belgium) Johnny Claes	Talbot-Lago T26C	+ 3 laps
13	(France) Pierre Levegh	Talbot-Lago T26C	+ 3 laps
14	(United Kingdom) Gordon Watson	Alta 69	+ 3 laps
15	(United Kingdom) Joe Fry	Maserati 4CL	+ 3 laps
16	(United Kingdom) George Nixon	ERA A-type	+ 3 laps
17	(United Kingdom) Roy Salvadori	Maserati 4CL	+ 3 laps
18	(United Kingdom) David Murray	Maserati 4CL	+ 4 laps
19	(Republic of Ireland) Joe Kelly	Maserati 6CM	+ 4 laps
20	(United Kingdom) Geoffrey Crossley	Alta GP	+ 4 laps
21	(United Kingdom) Geoff Richardson	RRA	+ 9 laps
Ret	(United Kingdom) St John Horsfall	ERA B-type	Fatal accident

=== Heats ===
Heat 1

Pos	Driver	Time/Retired
1	(Thailand) B. Bira	39:00.2
2	(Italy) Alberto Ascari	+ 0.8 s
3	(United Kingdom) Reg Parnell	+ 43.8 s
4	(United Kingdom) Bob Gerard	+1:56.2
5	(United Kingdom) Cuth Harrison	+ 1 lap
6	(United Kingdom) St John Horsfall	+ 1 lap
7	(France) Philippe Étancelin	+ 1 lap
8	(United Kingdom) Joe Fry	+ 2 laps
9	(Belgium) Johnny Claes	+ 2 laps
10	(United Kingdom) David Murray	+ 2 laps
11	(United Kingdom) Anthony Baring	+ 2 laps
12	(United Kingdom) Geoffrey Crossley	+ 2 laps
13	(United Kingdom) Richard Habershon	+ 3 laps
14	(United Kingdom) Brian Shawe-Taylor	+ 9 laps
Ret	(United Kingdom) Peter Whitehead	valve
Ret	(United Kingdom) Duncan Hamilton	oil pipe
Ret	(United Kingdom) Graham Whitehead	?
Ret	(United Kingdom) Michael Chorlton	oil pipe

- Pole position: Alberto Ascari – 1:56.0
Heat 2

Pos	Driver	Time/Retired
1	(Italy) Giuseppe Farina	39:44.4
2	(Italy) Luigi Villoresi	+ 5.2 s
3	(Switzerland) Emmanuel de Graffenried	+ 27.6 s
4	(United Kingdom) Peter Walker	+1:44.8
5	(United Kingdom) Roy Salvadori	+ 1 lap
6	(United Kingdom) Tony Rolt	+ 1 lap
7	(United Kingdom) Fred Ashmore	+ 1 lap
8	(United Kingdom) David Hampshire	+ 1 lap
9	(France) Pierre Levegh	+ 1 lap
10	(United Kingdom) Geoff Richardson	+ 2 laps
11	(United Kingdom) Gordon Watson	+ 2 laps
12	(United Kingdom) George Nixon	+ 2 laps
13	(Republic of Ireland) Joe Kelly	+ 2 laps
14	(United Kingdom) Geoff Ansell	+ 2 laps
Ret	(United Kingdom) Leslie Brooke	?
Ret	(United Kingdom) John Gordon	Oil pump
Ret	(Monaco) Louis Chiron	Cylinder head gasket
DNS	(United Kingdom) Raymond Mays	

- Pole position: Emmanuel de Graffenried – 1:55.0
