= Baslow =

Village in Derbyshire, England

Coordinates: 53.248°N 1.623°W

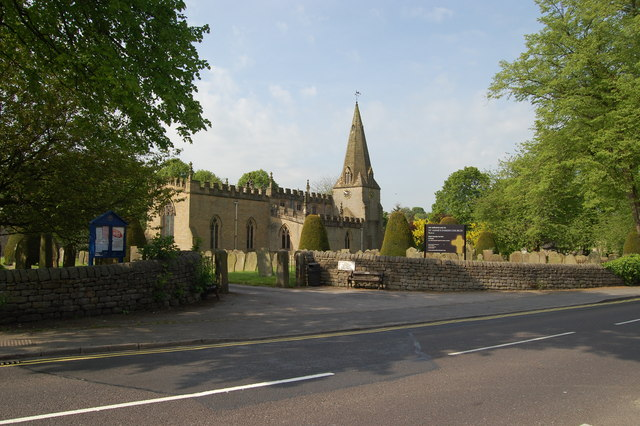
- Parish church

- Location within Derbyshire
- Population: 1,178
- OS grid reference: SK252723
- Civil parish: Baslow and Bubnell
- District: Derbyshire Dales
- Shire county: Derbyshire
- Region: East Midlands
- Country: England
- Sovereign state: United Kingdom
- Post town: BAKEWELL
- Postcode district: DE45
- Police: Derbyshire
- Fire: Derbyshire
- Ambulance: East Midlands
- UK Parliament: Derbyshire Dales

Pronounced
(listen)

Baslow is a village in Derbyshire, England, in the Peak District, situated between Sheffield and Bakewell, just over 1 mile (1.6 km) north of Chatsworth House. It is sited by the River Derwent, which is spanned by a 17th-century bridge, alongside which is a contemporary toll house.

Baslow village is composed of several distinct areas: Bubnell, Bridge End, Over End and Nether End. The village's civil parish, Baslow and Bubnell, had a population of 1,178, according to the 2011 census.

== History ==
St Anne's Church has an Anglo-Saxon coffin lid in the porch entrance, but the oldest part of the current building, the north aisle, dates from about 1200. The tower was constructed in the 13th century but the rest of the church is newer and was the subject of an extensive restoration in the 19th century. A sundial lies in the church grounds, atop the shaft, base and steps of a cross. This may have acted as a market cross in the 17th century. A second cross lies in the graveyard, moved from Bubnell by Doctor Wrench, who erected the nearby Wellington Monument and is buried in the churchyard. This cross may historically have been known as the "Butter Cross".

Just behind the church is Baslow Bridge, a Grade I listed building and scheduled monument. At the north west end of the bridge is a stone gabled watch hut, manned daily to protect the village from bandits (not a toll booth as is frequently stated). Built in 1608, this is the oldest bridge across the Derwent never to have been destroyed by floods.

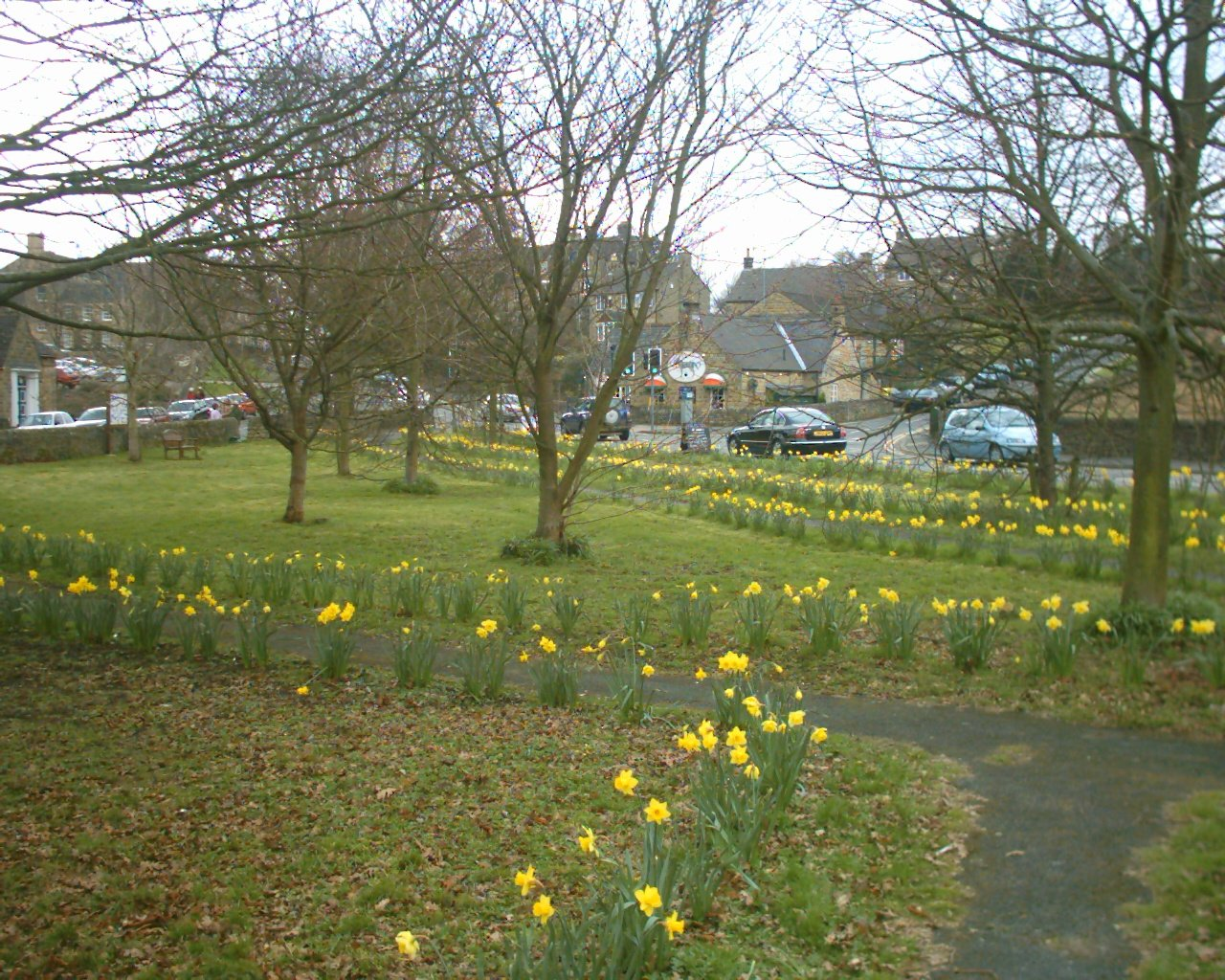
The village green in Nether End

The Baslow Grand Hotel Golf Club (now defunct) was founded in 1896. The course was still appearing on Ordnance Survey maps in the 1930s.

== Geography ==
Baslow village is composed of several distinct areas: Bubnell (west of the river), Bridge End (by the river crossings), Over End (north of the main road) and Nether End (adjacent to Chatsworth Park).

Bridge End is the original settlement, clustered around the church and the ancient bridge and ford across the River Derwent.

Nether End, at the eastern end of the village, has several hotels, pubs, restaurants and tea rooms. There is also a caravan site and a pedestrian entrance to Chatsworth Park. Just outside Nether End (and the village itself) are the so-called "Golden Gates", a set of gates dating from the 1st Duke's rebuilding of Chatsworth, which were moved here by Sir Joseph Paxton for William Cavendish, 6th Duke of Devonshire, in the 19th century to make a new entrance to the park, following its extension northwards towards Baslow in the 1830s. The gates are now only rarely used, most usually when large public events are held in the park.

Over End is a residential area on the hillside to the north of the village. It contains Baslow Hall, just off Calver Road, which was once occupied by Sebastian Ziani de Ferranti, the radio and electrical pioneer and inventor, and next by George Kenning. Today it is Fischer's Restaurant. Near the junction of Bar Road and Gorse Bank Lane was the site of a large Hydropathic hotel, which was demolished in 1936 and is now a small cul-de-sac called Hydro Close.

To the north of the village, Baslow Edge was once quarried for gritstone and features the Eagle Stone, an isolated 6-metre high block of gritstone. According to tradition, the local men had to climb this rock before they were worthy of marriage. Just behind it there is a monument to the Duke of Wellington, raised in 1866 by the local dignitary, Dr Lieutenant Colonel E. M. Wrench. It marked an earlier visit by Wellington to the moor, and was also intended as a balance to the nearby Nelson's Monument.

== Sport ==
=== Football ===
Baslow Football Club is based on Baslow Sports Field off Church Lane. The club currently competes in the Hope Valley Amateur League and they have a junior section in the Derwent Valley League.

=== Cricket ===
Baslow Cricket Club and ground is also based on Baslow Sports Field. The club has three senior teams: the 1st and 2nd XI Saturday teams compete in the Yorkshire and Derbyshire Cricket League and a Sunday XI team plays friendly matches in and around the region; they also have a junior section that plays in the Notts and Derby Border Youth Cricket League.

== Notable residents ==
- Frederic Barker (1808–1882) was born here and was vicar before being Bishop of Sydney.
- Francis Houlton Wrench (1869-1939), architect who designed Baslow Hall
- George Kenning (1880–1956), a nationwide car dealership entrepreneur, occupied Baslow Hall
- Valerie Hunter Gordon (1921–2016), the inventor of the world's first disposable nappy, and an early sanitary towel system.
- Michael Vaughan (born 1974), former cricketer and cricket commentator, moved locally in 2005

== See also ==
- Listed buildings in Baslow and Bubnell
