= Geoffrey Crossley =

British racing driver (1921–2002)

- Born: 11 May 1921; Baslow, Derbyshire, England
- Died: 7 January 2002 (aged 80); Headington, Oxfordshire, England

Formula One World Championship career
- Nationality: (United Kingdom) British
- Active years: 1950
- Team: privateer Alta
- Entries: 2
- Championships: 0
- Wins: 0
- Podiums: 0
- Career points: 0
- Pole positions: 0
- Fastest laps: 0
- First entry: 1950 British Grand Prix
- Last entry: 1950 Belgian Grand Prix

Geoffrey Crossley (11 May 1921 – 7 January 2002) was a British racing driver from England. He participated in two World Championship Formula One Grands Prix, debuting on 13 May 1950. He scored no championship points. He also participated in numerous non-Championship Formula One races.

== Racing career ==
By profession, Crossley was a furniture manufacturer, but he had been a keen amateur racing driver since just before World War II. Following the war he maintained his interest, and competed in a few races using a pre-war Alta, including the 1947 British Empire Trophy race on the Isle of Man.

In 1949, Crossley bought an Alta GP Grand Prix car, GP2, from the manufacturer, in Surrey. Made to order, the car featured a sleeker bodywork than its predecessors. With it, Crossley took International Class F (1,100 cc (67.1 cu in) to 1,500 cc (91.5 cu in)) standing start speed records over 50 km (125.92 mph), 50 miles (124.49 mph) and 100 km (124.17 mph) at the Montlhéry circuit in late 1949. Crossley also campaigned the Alta GP in selected races in 1949, including the 1949 Belgian Grand Prix, where he finished seventh and last, six laps down on the winner.

The following year, Crossley took part in the first ever World Championship Formula One race: the 1950 British Grand Prix at Silverstone Circuit. He qualified in 17th place, three places ahead of Joe Kelly in a similar Alta, despite the latter's higher specification engine. Crossley's race ended with transmission failure on lap 43. Later that season Crossley entered the Alta for the 1950 Belgian Grand Prix, where he qualified 12th and finished in ninth position. In addition to his Championship entries, Crossley also took part in a number of non-Championship races in the Alta, but at the end of the 1950 season he decided to retire due to the high costs of the sport.

Crossley made a brief return to motorsport in 1955, after he built a Lea-Francis-engined special which he called the Berkshire Special. Crossley entered the car for the 1955 Richmond Trophy race at Goodwood Circuit, but teething troubles with the car meant that he was slowest in practice and he decided to withdraw from the event. Owing to work and family commitments Crossley abandoned the Berkshire Special's development, and withdrew from racing for good.

Crossley died from a stroke, in the John Radcliffe Hospital, on 7 January 2002.

== Complete Formula One World Championship results ==
(key)

Year	Entrant	Chassis	Engine	1	2	3	4	5	6	7	WDC	Points
1950	Geoffrey Crossley	Alta GP	Alta L4s	GBR; Ret	MON	500	SUI	BEL; 9	FRA	ITA	NC	0

Records
Preceded by None	Youngest driver to start a Formula One race 29 years, 2 days (1950 British Grand Prix)	Succeeded by José Froilán González; 27 years, 228 days (1950 Monaco GP)
