= Strensham services =

Motorway service station in Worcestershire, England

Strensham Services
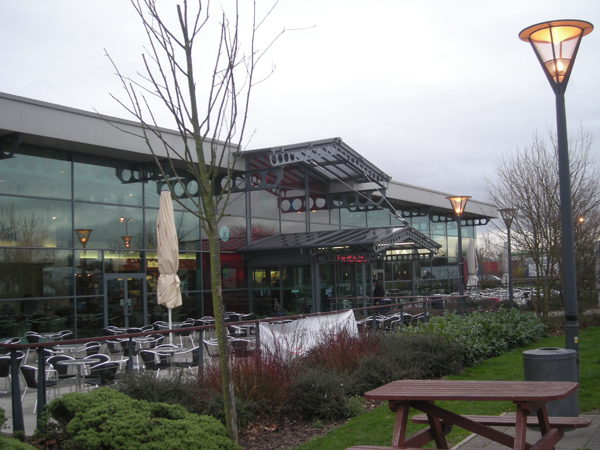
- The southbound services building.

- Location within Worcestershire

Information
- County: Worcestershire
- Road: M5 motorway
- Coordinates: 52.0573°N 2.1417°W
- Operator: Roadchef
- Previous operators: Kenning (1962 - 1994); Take a Break (1994 - 2001)
- Date opened: 1962
- Website: www.roadchef.com/home.asp

Northbound services
- Facilities: Days Inn Motel
- Fuel: BP
- OS grid reference: SO893409

Southbound services
- Fuel: BP
- OS grid reference: SO904399

Strensham services is a motorway service station on the M5 in Worcestershire, England. It is operated by Roadchef.

Unusually for a motorway service station, the two sites are about 0.5 miles (0.8 km) apart due to the proximity of junction 8 (for the M50 motorway). The services opened with the motorway in 1962 and have undergone many developments over time, largely due to the evolution of the motorway, which at the time of its opening ran from Birmingham to Strensham but now runs to Exeter about 120 miles (190 km) southwards. It was the first service station on the M5. The service station is also an operational base for the Midlands Air Ambulance.

== History ==
The original service station opened with the M5 and M50 motorways in November 1962, though none of the original buildings survive in use. It was built by A. Monk Ltd, of Padgate. The chief engineer was W.R.Thomson.

The M5, which was built with dual two-lane carriageways, was extended southwards, from junction 8 in 1969, with dual three-lane carriageways. It was widened between junctions 3 and 8 to dual three-lane carriageways in the early 1990s including a remodelling of junction 8 (M50). The proximity of the northbound area to the remodelled junction would have caused issues with traffic trying to join and leave the motorway and so it was relocated 0.5 miles (0.8 km) to the north on a new larger site in 1991. The exit from the southbound services has been altered to feed directly into the M50 junction. The former northbound area is now in use as a maintenance area, though due to the motorway widening this can now only be accessed from the local road network.

Wychavon District Council refused to renew the gambling machine permit for the service area in 1994, under its policy not to allow gambling machines in areas where food was sold to the public. The Kenning Motor Group, who operated the service area at the time went to the High Court to overturn the decision.

In 1994, the service area was subject to a management buyout, led by Nick Turner, who had been running the site for the previous three years. It was announced the services would trade under the new name, Take a Break. At the time Roadchef unsuccessfully showed interest in purchasing the site, it was not until 2001, by purchasing Take A Break that Roadchef started operating at the Strensham site.

Strensham was one of two test sites chosen by Roadchef for a new loyalty card scheme in 2005. The cards themselves used new technology to physically display the points total on the card. The loyalty scheme is no longer in use today.

In July 2008, Roadchef started a trial at the southbound site by replacing the Wimpy fast food franchise with a McDonald's outlet, previously only four UK motorway service areas had McDonald's franchises. If this trial was deemed to be successful, Roadchef planned to replace more Wimpy franchises. As part of this trial signs for the southbound area were changed to show the operator name as "McDonald's Costa", although the Roadchef brand is still used at the services itself. The refurbishment created around 80 jobs in the local area.

Since the southbound refurbishment, all Wimpy outlets have closed to be replaced by own brand The Burger Company. It is thought that this is just a 'holding' brand prior to a full-scale refurbishment. Due to the success of the trial Roadchef have refurbished more sites (including Strensham northbound) to include The Hot Food Company (Restaurant) and McDonald's.

== Notable events ==
=== 2007 Worcestershire flooding ===
As a consequence of heavy rainfall in Worcestershire in July 2007, the M5 motorway was blocked, leaving many stranded cars on the road. The operations manager of the service station, Quintin Speers, provided a key role in helping those stranded, opening up areas of the main building to be used by those stuck on the motorway. Speers also helped drivers by pushing cars to safety and distributing blankets to those in need.

== Air ambulance base ==
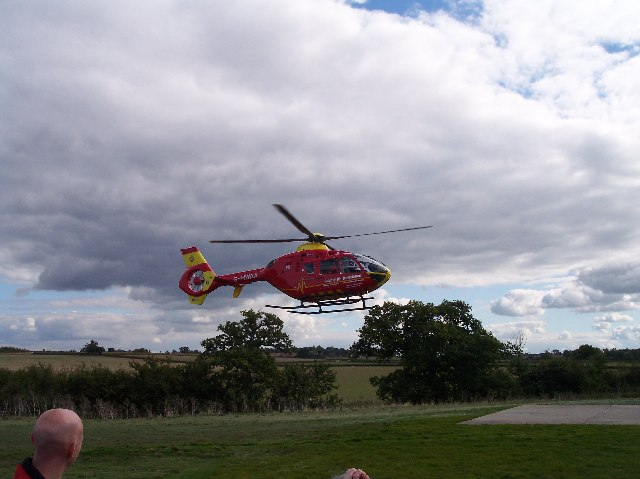
The air ambulance

The Midlands Air Ambulance, formerly known as the County Air Ambulance, which has been operating since 1991, moved to the Strensham site in 1998 under a sponsorship deal with Take a Break, who were operating the service area at the time. Access to the air ambulance site can be made from the service station itself or from the local road network via the staff entrance to the services. An open day is held at the site each year to raise money for the operation of the air ambulance. In May 2008, the operational hours of the service was increased from 12 to 14 hours each day, as a result of this, landing lights needed to be installed at the base to enable night time use. From 2022, operations on this site moved to 18 hours a day, and from early 2024, 24-hour operations started: responding by aircraft during the day and rapid response vehicle at night.

== Present day ==
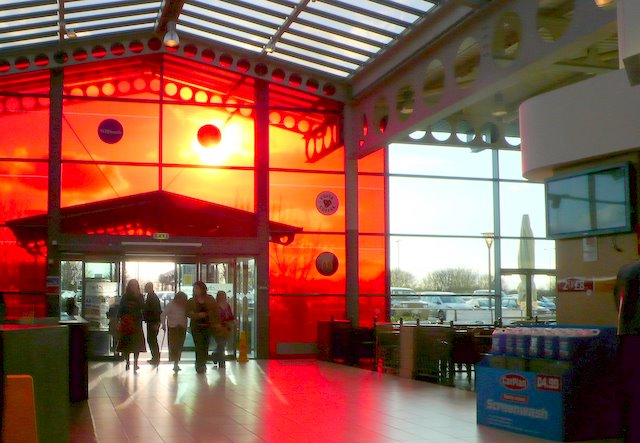
Inside the southbound service area

The buildings at this site are described in the book Pevsner's guide to Worcestershire.

=== Southbound ===
The southbound site is in its original location, though none of the original buildings survive. The main building is a large glass-fronted structure with the main car park situated in front of the building, with the lorry and coach parking behind.

In May 2005, it was reported that the southbound services had overnight parking facilities for 60 lorries. This was a chargeable service.

=== Northbound ===
Situated 0.5 miles (0.8 km) to the north of the southbound services, the northbound services are set back from the motorway. The main building has an unusual design based on curves and circles. Unlike the southbound site, the cash machines are located outside and both the car and lorry parking is to the front of the building.

Access to an air ambulance base is at the rear of the site. The site also has a budget-chain hotel located within the service area. In May 2005, it was reported that the northbound services had overnight parking facilities for 100 lorries. This was a chargeable service.

== Location ==
Strensham services are located slightly to the north of M5 junction 8, the exit slip road from the southbound area merges into the slip road from the M5 to junction 8, so traffic must negotiate junction 8 to rejoin the M5. Northbound the service area is about 1 mile (1.6 km) of the junction.

The services are located about 12 miles (19 km) south of Worcester, and about 16 miles (26 km) north of Gloucester.

Previous: Frankley	Motorway service stations on the M5 Motorway	Next: Gloucester
