= 1950 British Grand Prix =

Formula One motor race held in 1950

Next race →
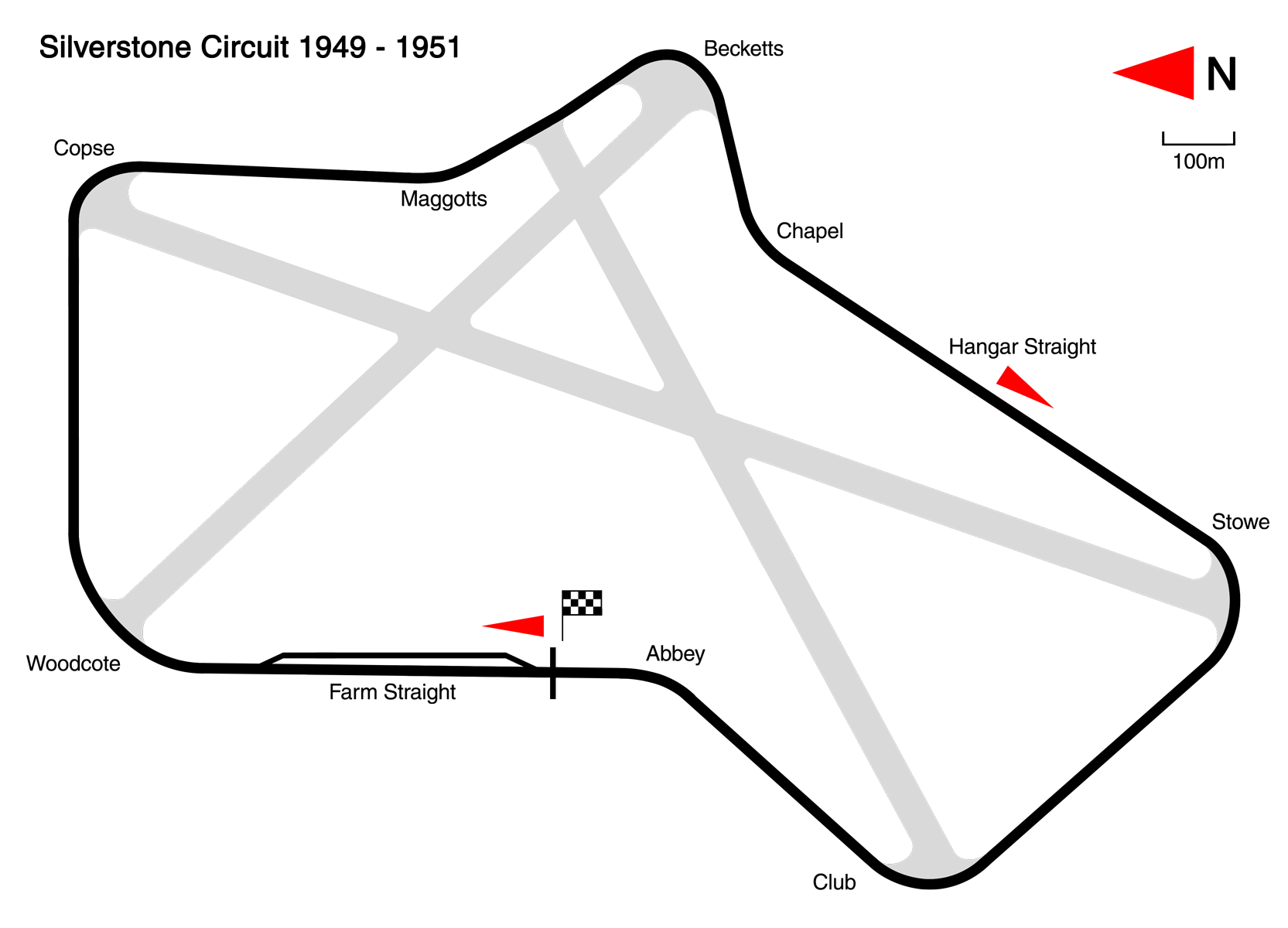
- Silverstone Circuit in 1950–1951 configuration

Race details
- Date: 13 May 1950
- Official name: The Royal Automobile Club Grand Prix d'Europe Incorporating The British Grand Prix
- Location: Silverstone Circuit; Silverstone, England
- Course: Permanent racing facility
- Course length: 4.649 km (2.889 mi)
- Distance: 70 laps, 325.430 km (202.213 mi)
- Weather: Sunny, mild, dry.
- Attendance: 100,000

Pole position
Driver	(Italy) Nino Farina	Alfa Romeo
- Time: 1:50.8

Fastest lap
Driver	(Italy) Nino Farina	Alfa Romeo
- Time: 1:50.6 on lap 2

Podium
First	(Italy) Nino Farina	Alfa Romeo
Second	(Italy) Luigi Fagioli	Alfa Romeo
Third	(United Kingdom) Reg Parnell	Alfa Romeo

The 1950 British Grand Prix, formally known as The Royal Automobile Club Grand Prix d'Europe Incorporating The British Grand Prix, was a Formula One motor race held on 13 May 1950 at the Silverstone Circuit in Silverstone, England. It was the first World Championship Formula One race, as well as the fifth British Grand Prix, and the third to be held at Silverstone after motor racing resumed after World War II. It was the first race of seven in the 1950 World Championship of Drivers.

The 70-lap race was won by Nino Farina for the Alfa Romeo team, after starting from pole position, with a race time of 2:13:23.6 and an average speed of 146.378 km/h (90.955 mph). Luigi Fagioli finished second in another Alfa Romeo, and Reg Parnell third in a third Alfa Romeo.

The race followed the non-championship Pau Grand Prix and San Remo Grand Prix (both won by Juan Manuel Fangio), the Richmond Trophy (won by Reg Parnell), and the Paris Grand Prix (won by Georges Grignard).

== Background ==
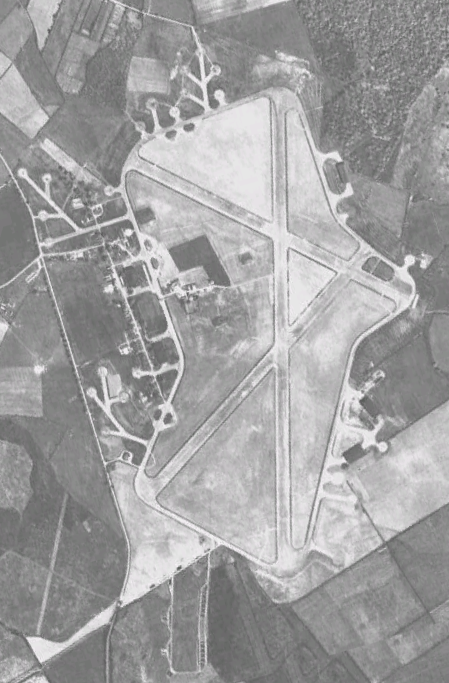
RAF Silverstone airport in 1945

=== Early Formula One racing ===
In 1946, the Fédération Internationale de l'Automobile's Commission Sportive Internationale first defined the "International Formula", a premier single-seater racing series to start in 1947. While the first Formula One race was the 1947 Pau Grand Prix, the 1950 British Grand Prix was the first Grand Prix of the new World Championship of Drivers.

Four non-championship races were held all across Europe in 1950 prior to the Grand Prix: Juan Manuel Fangio won the races in Pau and San Remo, Reg Parnell won in Douglas, and Georges Grignard won in Paris.

=== The first World Championship race ===
The 1950 edition of the British Grand Prix was fifth held since 1926 and the third held at Silverstone Circuit since its first time in 1948. It was also the designated European Grand Prix for the year, making it the 11th time the circuit has held the title since the first race in 1923.

The race was also supported by an international 500cc Formula Three race the same weekend, which was won by Stirling Moss driving a Cooper-JAP. There was also a demonstration run for the BRM P15, which was due to enter the sport later in the year. The race was attended by George VI, Queen Elizabeth The Queen Mother, Princess Margaret, and the Earl & Countess Mountbatten of Burma, which makes it the only motor race (and Formula 1 Grand Prix) in Britain attended by a reigning British monarch.

=== Entries ===
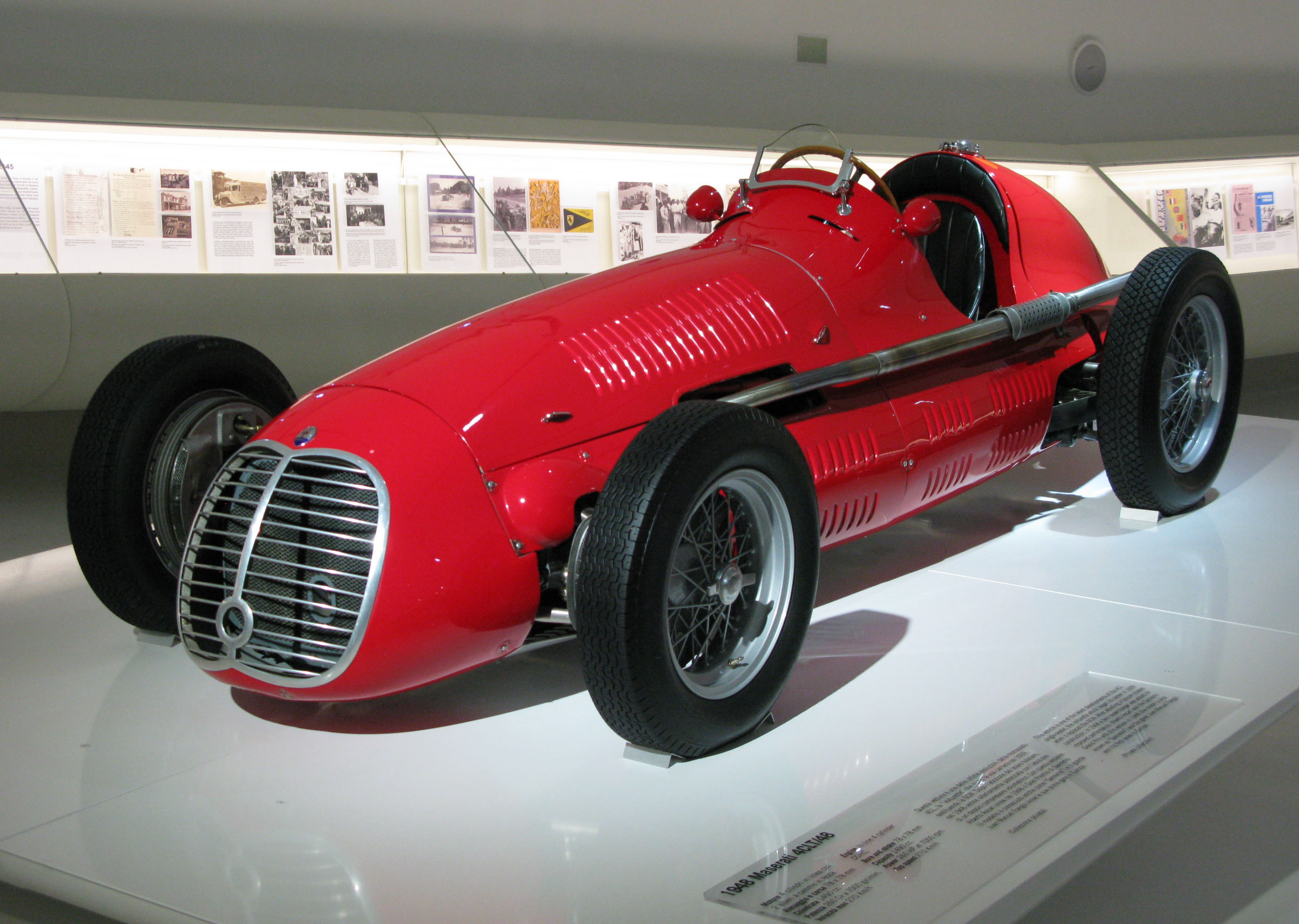
Maserati 4CLT/48

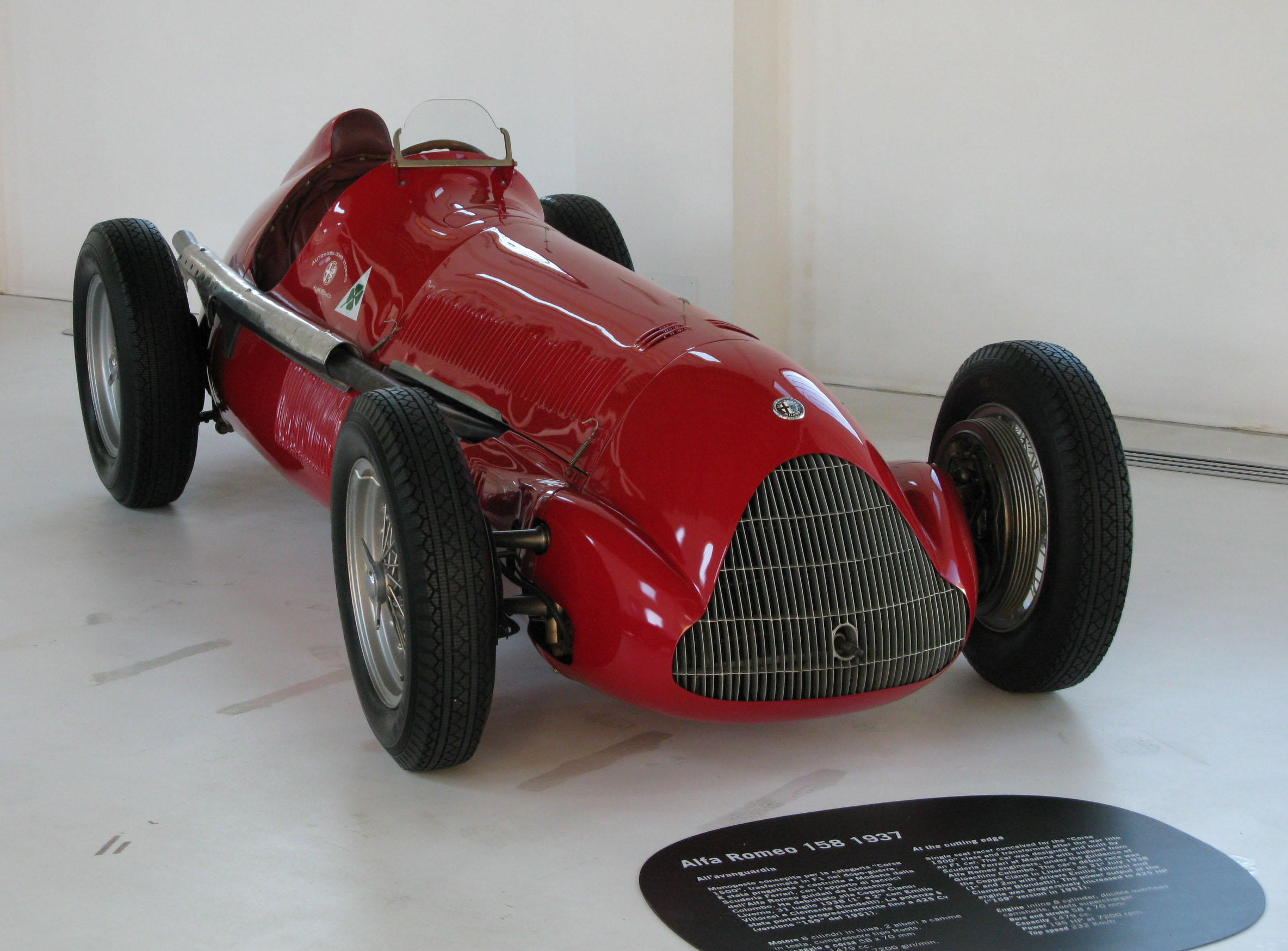
Alfa Romeo Alfetta 158

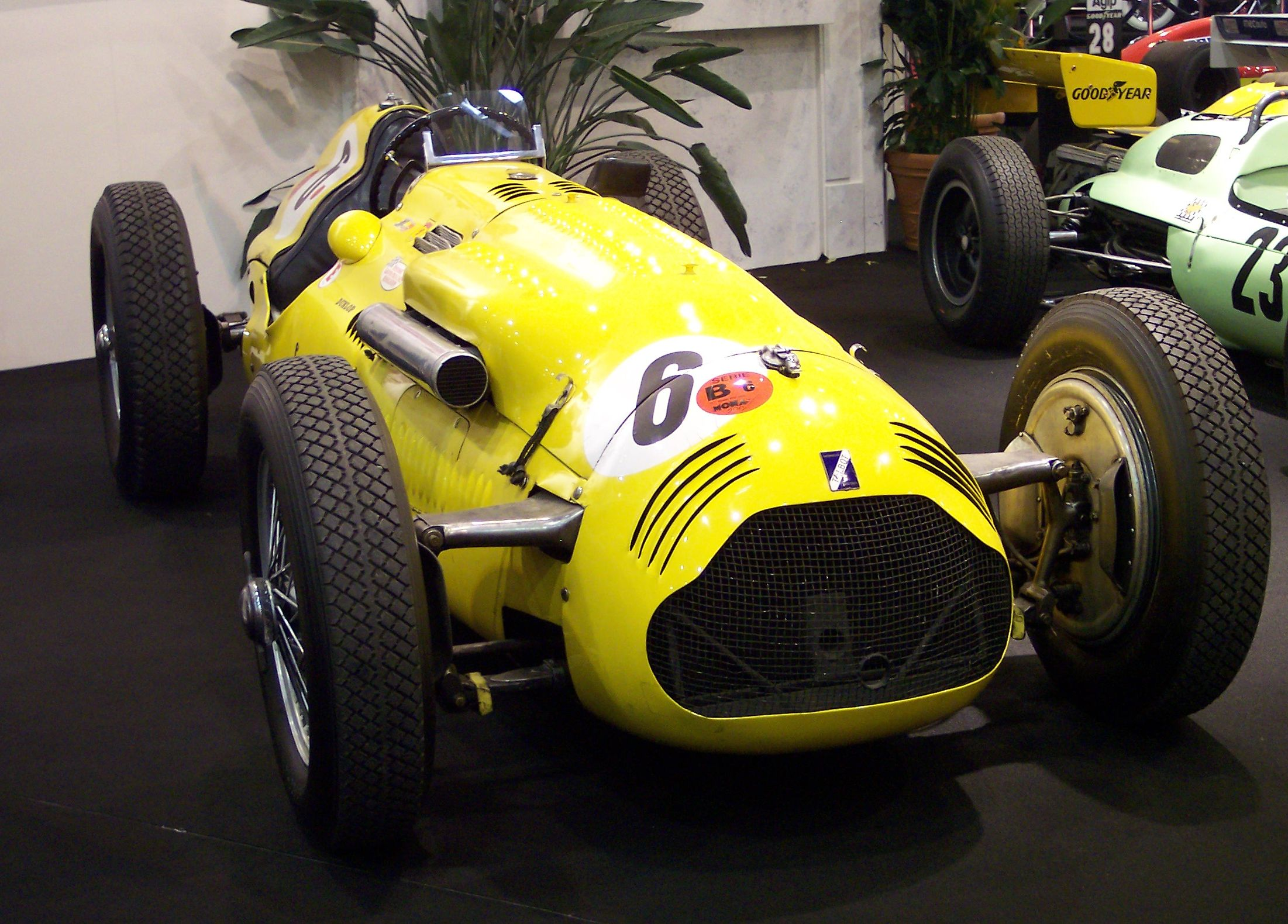
Talbot-Lago T26C

24 drivers were entered for the first race with them competing in 22 different cars. The numbers 7 and 13 were not assigned. The biggest absence was the Scuderia Ferrari who would not compete in the opening race with Enzo Ferrari not sending any cars to Britain with the team debuting at the next round in Monaco, due to the small amount of appearance money the organisers were willing to pay him to participate.

This meant that Alfa Romeo were favourites with their four drivers Farina, Fangio, Fagioli, and British driver, Reg Parnell, while their main competition came from the Maseratis of the Scuderia Ambrosiana and Enrico Platé teams. Felice Bonetto also entered a Maserati but would not arrive for the race.

Talbot-Lago sent over two factory cars in the traditional French pale blue colour to be driven by Yves Giraud-Cabantous and Eugène Martin. Other private Talbots were entered by Louis Rosier, Philippe Étancelin, and Belgian Johnny Claes in a car painted in Belgium's national yellow colour. The rest of the field was made up of local machinery, which included four ERAs and two Altas in British racing green.

No	Driver	Entrant	Constructor	Chassis	Engine	Tyre
1	(Argentina) Juan Manuel Fangio	Alfa Romeo SpA	Alfa Romeo	Alfa Romeo 158	Alfa Romeo 158 1.5 L8s	P
2	(Italy) Nino Farina	Alfa Romeo SpA	Alfa Romeo	Alfa Romeo 158	Alfa Romeo 158 1.5 L8s	P
3	(Italy) Luigi Fagioli^{1}	Alfa Romeo SpA	Alfa Romeo	Alfa Romeo 158	Alfa Romeo 158 1.5 L8s	P
4	(United Kingdom) Reg Parnell	Alfa Romeo SpA	Alfa Romeo	Alfa Romeo 158	Alfa Romeo 158 1.5 L8s	P
5	(United Kingdom) David Murray	Scuderia Ambrosiana	Maserati	Maserati 4CLT/48	Maserati 4CLT 1.5 L4s	D
6	(United Kingdom) David Hampshire	Scuderia Ambrosiana	Maserati	Maserati 4CLT/48	Maserati 4CLT 1.5 L4s	D
7	(United Kingdom) Duncan Hamilton	Duncan Hamilton	Maserati	Maserati 4CL	Maserati 4CL 1.5 L4s	D
8	(United Kingdom) Leslie Johnson	T.A.S.O. Mathieson	ERA	ERA E	ERA 1.5 L6s	D
9	(United Kingdom) Peter Walker^{2}	Peter Walker	ERA	ERA E	ERA 1.5 L6s	D
10	(United Kingdom) Joe Fry^{3}	Joe Fry	Maserati	Maserati 4CL	Maserati 4CL 1.5 L4s	D
11	(United Kingdom) Cuth Harrison	Cuth Harrison	ERA	ERA B	ERA 1.5 L6s	D
12	(United Kingdom) Bob Gerard	Bob Gerard	ERA	ERA B	ERA 1.5 L6s	D
14	(France) Yves Giraud-Cabantous	Automobiles Talbot-Darracq	Talbot-Lago	Talbot-Lago T26C-DA	Talbot 23CV 4.5 L6	D
15	(France) Louis Rosier	Ecurie Rosier	Talbot-Lago	Talbot-Lago T26C	Talbot 23CV 4.5 L6	D
16	(France) Philippe Étancelin	Automobiles Talbot-Darracq	Talbot-Lago	Talbot-Lago T26C	Talbot 23CV 4.5 L6	D
17	(France) Eugène Martin	Automobiles Talbot-Darracq	Talbot-Lago	Talbot-Lago T26C-DA	Talbot 23CV 4.5 L6	D
18	(Belgium) Johnny Claes	Ecurie Belge	Talbot-Lago	Talbot-Lago T26C	Talbot 23CV 4.5 L6	D
19	(Monaco) Louis Chiron	Officine Alfieri Maserati	Maserati	Maserati 4CLT/48	Maserati 4CLT 1.5 L4s	P
20	(Switzerland) Toulo de Graffenried	Enrico Platé	Maserati	Maserati 4CLT/48	Maserati 4CLT 1.5 L4s	P
21	(Thailand) Prince Bira	Enrico Platé	Maserati	Maserati 4CLT/48	Maserati 4CLT 1.5 L4s	P
22	(Italy) Felice Bonetto	Scuderia Milano	Maserati	Maserati 4CLT/50	Maserati 4CLT 1.5 L4s	P
23	(Republic of Ireland) Joe Kelly	Joe Kelly	Alta	Alta GP	Alta 1.5 L4s	D
24	(United Kingdom) Geoffrey Crossley	Geoffrey Crossley	Alta	Alta GP	Alta 1.5 L4s	D
26	(United Kingdom) Raymond Mays^{4}	Raymond Mays	ERA	ERA D	ERA 1.5 L6s	D

^1 – Luigi Fagioli qualified and drove all 70 laps of the race in the #3 Alfa Romeo. Gianbattista Guidotti, named substitute driver for the car, was not used at the Grand Prix.
^2 – Peter Walker qualified and drove 2 laps of the race in the #9 ERA. Tony Rolt took over the car for 3 laps of the race.
^3 – Joe Fry qualified and drove 45 laps of the race in the #10 Maserati. Brian Shawe-Taylor took over the car for 19 laps of the race.
^4 – Entry cancelled prior to the event.

== Qualifying ==
Qualifying took place on Friday and saw the Alfa Romeos end up on the front row of the grid as Farina claimed the first pole position in the history of Formula One with a time of 1:50.8. Fagioli and Fangio and Parnell would fill the remaining spots on the front row of the grid. Prince Bira was the fastest non-Alfa, 1.8 seconds back with the two Talbot's cars filling in the second row.

=== Qualifying classification ===
Pos	No	Driver	Constructor	Time
1	2	(Italy) Nino Farina	Alfa Romeo	1:50.8
2	3	(Italy) Luigi Fagioli	Alfa Romeo	1:51.0
3	1	(Argentina) Juan Manuel Fangio	Alfa Romeo	1:51.2
4	4	(United Kingdom) Reg Parnell	Alfa Romeo	1:52.2
5	21	(Thailand) Prince Bira	Maserati	1:52.6
6	14	(France) Yves Giraud-Cabantous	Talbot-Lago-Talbot	1:53.4
7	17	(France) Eugène Martin	Talbot-Lago-Talbot	1:55.4
8	20	(Switzerland) Toulo de Graffenried	Maserati	1:55.8
9	15	(France) Louis Rosier	Talbot-Lago-Talbot	1:56.0
10	9	(United Kingdom) Peter Walker	ERA	1:56.6
11	19	(Monaco) Louis Chiron	Maserati	1:56.6
12	8	(United Kingdom) Leslie Johnson	ERA	1:57.4
13	12	(United Kingdom) Bob Gerard	ERA	1:57.4
14	16	(France) Philippe Étancelin	Talbot-Lago-Talbot	1:57.8
15	11	(United Kingdom) Cuth Harrison	ERA	1:58.4
16	6	(United Kingdom) David Hampshire	Maserati	2:01.0
17	24	(United Kingdom) Geoffrey Crossley	Alta	2:02.6
18	5	(United Kingdom) David Murray	Maserati	2:05.6
19	23	(Republic of Ireland) Joe Kelly	Alta	2:06.2
20	10	(United Kingdom) Joe Fry	Maserati	2:07.0
21	18	(Belgium) Johnny Claes	Talbot-Lago-Talbot	2:08.8
DNA	7	(United Kingdom) Duncan Hamilton	Maserati	–
DNA	22	(Italy) Felice Bonetto	Maserati	–

== Race ==
On 13 May, 21 drivers from nine countries were represented at the old Silverstone airport, four from France, two from Italy, and one each from Belgium, Ireland, Monaco, Argentina, Thailand and Switzerland. The UK was represented by 9 drivers. The race drew 200,000 spectators. The cars drew up in a 4-3-4 formation. At the start of the race, Farina took the lead with Fagioli and Fangio in pursuit, while Cabantous got a poor start and lost four positions. In the early laps, they switched around between themselves several times to keep everyone amused. Fangio retired with engine troubles caused by a broken oil pipe (possibly due to clipping a straw bale) and so Farina led Fagioli home by 2.5 seconds with Parnell a distant third, despite hitting a hare during the race which caused a significant dent in the cowling of the British driver’s car. The nearest challenger was Giraud-Cabantous two laps down, with Bira having retired with a fuel problem. Crossley and Murray duelled at the back before retiring, de Graffenried had done so on lap 34, while Chiron was demoted to the role of the viewer 10 laps earlier.

Nino Farina led for 63 laps (1–9, 16–37 and 39–70). Luigi Fagioli led for 6 laps (10–15). Juan Manuel Fangio led for 1 lap (38).

Nino Farina achieved the fastest lap of the race, with a 1:50.6 on Lap 2.

=== Race classification ===
Pos	No	Driver	Constructor	Laps	Time/Retired	Grid	Points
1	2	(Italy) Nino Farina	Alfa Romeo	70	2:13:23.6	1	9^{1}
2	3	(Italy) Luigi Fagioli	Alfa Romeo	70	+2.6	2	6
3	4	(United Kingdom) Reg Parnell	Alfa Romeo	70	+52.0	4	4
4	14	(France) Yves Giraud-Cabantous	Talbot-Lago-Talbot	68	+2 laps	6	3
5	15	(France) Louis Rosier	Talbot-Lago-Talbot	68	+2 laps	9	2
6	12	(United Kingdom) Bob Gerard	ERA	67	+3 laps	13	
7	11	(United Kingdom) Cuth Harrison	ERA	67	+3 laps	15	
8	16	(France) Philippe Étancelin	Talbot-Lago-Talbot	65	+5 laps	14	
9	6	(United Kingdom) David Hampshire	Maserati	64	+6 laps	16	
10	10	(United Kingdom) Joe Fry^{2}	Maserati	64	+6 laps	20	
10	10	(United Kingdom) Brian Shawe-Taylor^{2}	Maserati	64	+6 laps	20	
11	18	(Belgium) Johnny Claes	Talbot-Lago-Talbot	64	+6 laps	21	
Ret	1	(Argentina) Juan Manuel Fangio	Alfa Romeo	62	Oil pipe	3	
NC	23	(Republic of Ireland) Joe Kelly	Alta	57	Not classified	19	
Ret	21	(Thailand) Prince Bira	Maserati	49	Out of fuel	5	
Ret	5	(United Kingdom) David Murray	Maserati	44	Engine	18	
Ret	24	(United Kingdom) Geoffrey Crossley	Alta	43	Transmission	17	
Ret	20	(Switzerland) Toulo de Graffenried	Maserati	36	Engine	8	
Ret	19	(Monaco) Louis Chiron	Maserati	24	Clutch	11	
Ret	17	(France) Eugène Martin	Talbot-Lago-Talbot	8	Oil pressure	7	
Ret	9	(United Kingdom) Peter Walker^{3}	ERA	5	Gearbox	10	
Ret	9	(United Kingdom) Tony Rolt^{3}	ERA	5	Gearbox	10	
Ret	8	(United Kingdom) Leslie Johnson	ERA	2	Compressor	12	

Notes

- ^1 – Includes 1 point for fastest lap
- ^2 – Joe Fry drove car #10 for the first 45 laps, then Brian Shawe-Taylor took over for 19 laps for a total of 64 laps.
- ^3 – Peter Walker drove car #9 for 2 laps, then Tony Rolt drove for an additional 3 laps, totaling 5 laps.

== Championship standings after the race ==
Drivers' Championship standings

Pos	Driver	Points
1	(Italy) Nino Farina	9
2	(Italy) Luigi Fagioli	6
3	(United Kingdom) Reg Parnell	4
4	(France) Yves Giraud-Cabantous	3
5	(France) Louis Rosier	2

- Note: Only the top five positions are listed. Only the best 4 results counted towards the Championship.

Previous race: N/A	FIA Formula One World Championship; 1950 season	Next race: 1950 Monaco Grand Prix
Previous race: 1949 British Grand Prix	British Grand Prix	Next race: 1951 British Grand Prix
Previous race: 1949 Italian Grand Prix	European Grand Prix (Designated European Grand Prix)	Next race: 1951 French Grand Prix
