= Baslow and Bubnell =

Civil parish in Derbyshire, England

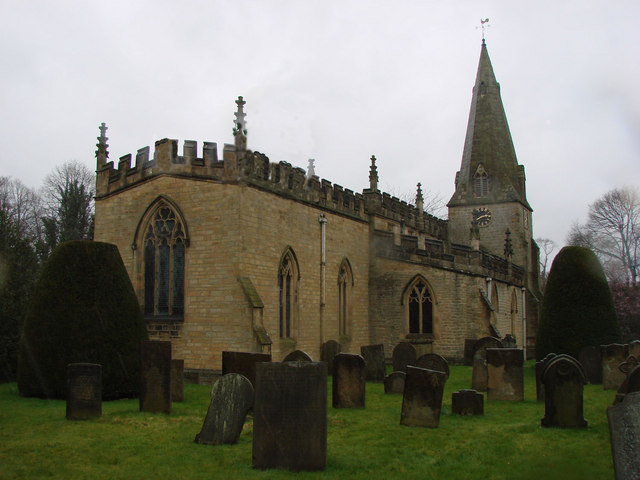
Baslow and Bubnell parish church.

Baslow and Bubnell parish highlighted within Derbyshire

Baslow and Bubnell is a civil parish in the Derbyshire Dales district of Derbyshire in England. According to the 2001 census it had a population of 1,185, falling slightly to 1,178 at the 2011 census. The parish is in the Peak District National Park and covers Baslow and Bubnell.

Baslow and Bubnell may also be known as 'Bakewell' due to its chapelry with the Bakewell parish.

John Marius described Baslow and Bubnell between 1870 and 1872 as: "The village stands on the river Derwent, in the northern vicinity of Chatsworth, 3½ miles NE of Bakewell r. station. It has a post office‡ under Chesterfield, and a good inn; and it forms a pleasant centre to tourists for visiting Chatsworth.

Baslow and Bubnell, often referred to as simply "Baslow", is close to Chatsworth House and the Peak District National Park.

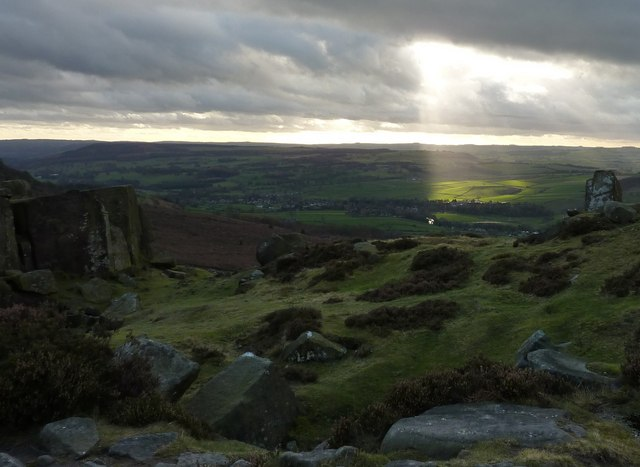
A 'God's Searchlight' found in Bubnell, Baslow

== Population and background ==
According to the 2011 census its population now stands at 1,178.

Population Graph between 1911 and 1931

Baslow is divided into three distinct areas, Over End, Nether End and Bridge End, where the river Derwent is spanned by a charming, 17th-century, three-arched bridge, beside which is a little stone shelter built for the toll collector. Nether End, with its 'Goose Green', a triangular paddock with trees and thatched cottages overlooking a brook, is popular with visitors. There is a number of little shops here.

St Anne's is both a beautiful and unusual church – one clock tower has Roman numerals and is dated 1759 and the other has 'Victoria 1897' on its face to mark Queen Victoria's Golden Jubilee. Inside the church by the door, in a glass case, is a dog whip, which in the 17th and 18th centuries was used by the official 'dog whipper' to keep stray dogs in order during the service. The whip has a thong three feet long, which is still in excellent condition and is bound round the handle with leather. Some historians also claim that it was used to maintain order among worshippers and to wake up those who snored during the service!

In the late 19th century a Hydropathic Establishment was built for people to come and 'take the cure', in the belief that Baslow Waters were a benefit to those suffering from joint and muscle pain. It was demolished in the 1920s. The inhabitants are partly employed in the cotton manufacture, and there are some quarries of ordinary building-stone. The living is a perpetual curacy; net income, £115; patron, the Duke of Devonshire; impropriator, the Duke of Rutland: the tithes (those on wool and lamb excepted) were commuted for land in 1822. The chapel, which is chiefly in the later English style, has a tower and low spire at the western end of the north aisle. There are two places of worship for Wesleyans; and about half a mile from the village is Stanton-Ford school, endowed with about £15 per annum.

== Prominent features ==
There are many historical features within the Baslow and Burnell Parish including The Wellington Monument, The Nelson Monument, The Victoria Stone and The Eagle Stone.

== See also ==
- Listed buildings in Baslow and Bubnell
