= Midlands Air Ambulance =

English charity air ambulance

Midlands Air Ambulance Charity
- Abbreviation: MAAC
- Formation: 1990
- Type: Charity
- Locations: RAF Cosford, Shropshire; Tatenhill, Staffordshire; Strensham, Worcestershire
- Region served: The Midlands and part of the South West
- Key people: Hanna Sebright – CEO
- Revenue: £19.9 million (2025)
- Staff: 159 (2025)
- Volunteers: 351 (2025)
- Website: www.midlandsairambulance.com

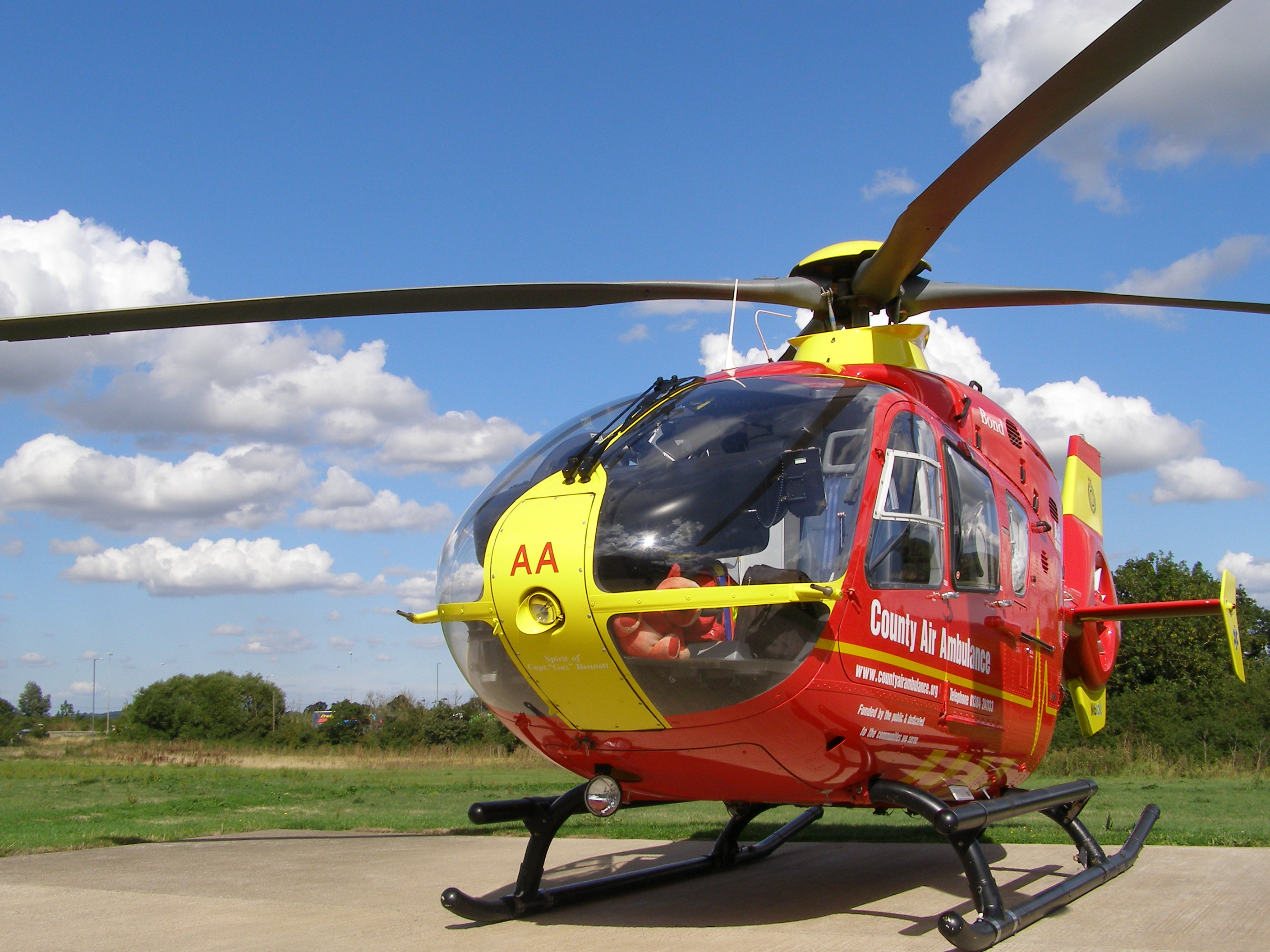
Airbus Helicopters H135 G-HWAA based at Tatenhill Airfield

The Midlands Air Ambulance Charity (MAAC), formerly County Air Ambulance, is a charity operating a Helicopter Emergency Medical Service (HEMS) in Gloucestershire, Herefordshire, Shropshire, Staffordshire, Worcestershire and the West Midlands. It operates three aircraft.

== History ==
The Midlands Air Ambulance was first registered as a charity in 1990, and started using the County Air Ambulance name in 1993. The role of the charity is the provision of HEMS in the Midland counties of England. It also provides secondary support to neighbouring counties. It responds to 2,000 potentially life saving missions every year.

At launch, the charity operated a single helicopter based at Halfpenny Green Airport and, at its peak, had grown to operating three aircraft covering 8,000 square miles (21,000 km^{2}) across 12 counties of England and Wales. The reduction in areas covered began in 2006 and was largely due to other air ambulance charities setting up or expanding and to consolidation of West Midlands Ambulance Service (WMAS) assets in the WMAS areas of responsibility. The operating name was changed back to Midlands Air Ambulance in 2009 to reflect the smaller area covered. Until 31 March 2008, the charity also served the East Midlands Ambulance Service (EMAS) area, based at East Midlands Airport, but, after some political wrangling between WMAS and EMAS, the aircraft was withdrawn and redeployed into Tatenhill, Staffordshire.

On 3 April 2014, MAAC introduced its first wholly owned Airbus Helicopters H135 helicopter (registration G-OMAA), which replaced one of the three leased aircraft.

In September 2015, three MAAC team members were honoured with a Pride of Britain Award following their response to a collision on The Smiler ride at Alton Towers.

In November 2017, doctors began working all shifts from all three airfields, working alongside a paramedic and pilot. Previously, only RAF Cosford had a doctor on-duty on a daily basis, leaving the other two bases with dual paramedic coverage.

On 20 February 2018, MAAC received a brand new Airbus Helicopters H145, the second aircraft owned by the charity. The aircraft was handed over at the Strensham services base, before being transferred to RAF Cosford.

== Organisation ==
The charity aircraft and response cars are generally crewed by Critical Care Paramedics and Doctors. In the year to March 2025, MAAC had an income of £19.9 million, and expenditure of £18.5M, of which £12.2M (66%) was spent on providing the air ambulance service. In 2025, the charity had 159 employees, of which 35 were paid between £60,000 and £200,000. The charity is generally funded by charitable donations given by companies, organisations, and members of the public, although in 2021 it received seven government grants totalling £668,000.

MAAC should not be confused with the County Air Ambulance Trust, which is a separate registered charity. That charity raises money for the provision of infrastructure items (such as helipads at hospitals) and also make an annual contribution towards a number of air ambulance charities, including the Midlands Air Ambulance.

== Coverage ==
The service covers the counties of Worcestershire, Shropshire, Staffordshire, Herefordshire, Gloucestershire and the West Midlands. It also provides secondary coverage to the surrounding areas.

== Helicopters ==
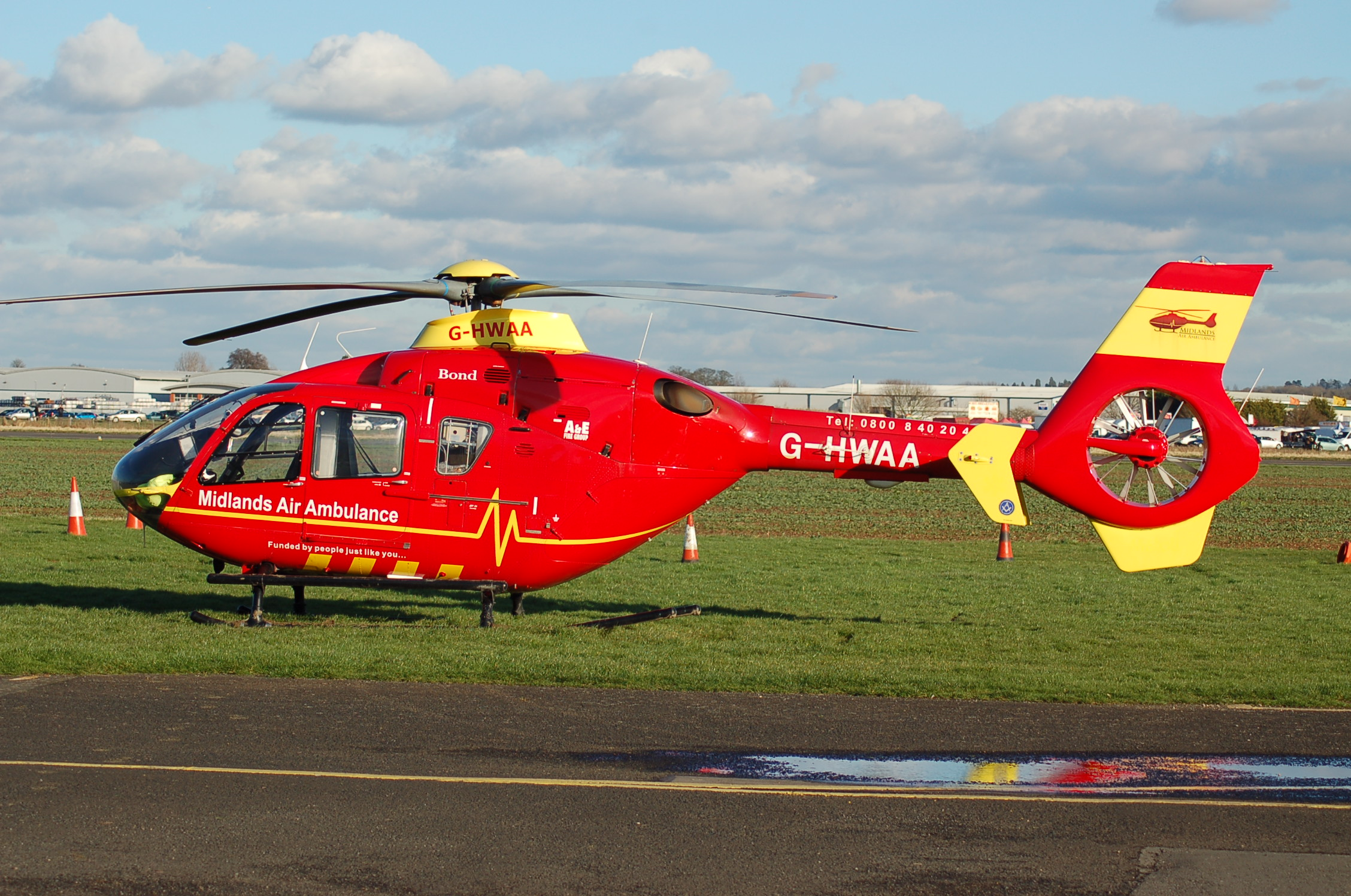
G-HWAA Airbus Helicopters H135

As of July 2026, MAAC use two Airbus H145 helicopters and a Eurocopter EC135, based at RAF Cosford in Shropshire, Tatenhill Airfield in Staffordshire, and Strensham services on the M5 motorway in Worcestershire. Each helicopter is crewed by one pilot, one doctor and one paramedic, and occasionally a second paramedic.

The pilots and helicopter maintenance are provided by Babcock Mission Critical Services Onshore.

Current fleet
	Registration	Aircraft	Callsign
RAF Cosford	G-RMAA	Airbus Helicopters H145	Helimed 03
Strensham services	G-OMAA	Airbus Helicopters H135	Helimed 06
Tatenhill Airfield	G-HMAA	Airbus Helicopters H145	Helimed 09

Previous fleet
Registration	Aircraft	Introduced	Retired
G-HWAA	Eurocopter EC135	2005	2025
G-EMAA	Eurocopter EC135	2005	2018
G-WMAA	MBB Bo 105	1994	2006
G-WMAS	Eurocopter EC135	2001	2014

== See also ==
- Air ambulances in the United Kingdom
