= Francis Houlton Wrench =

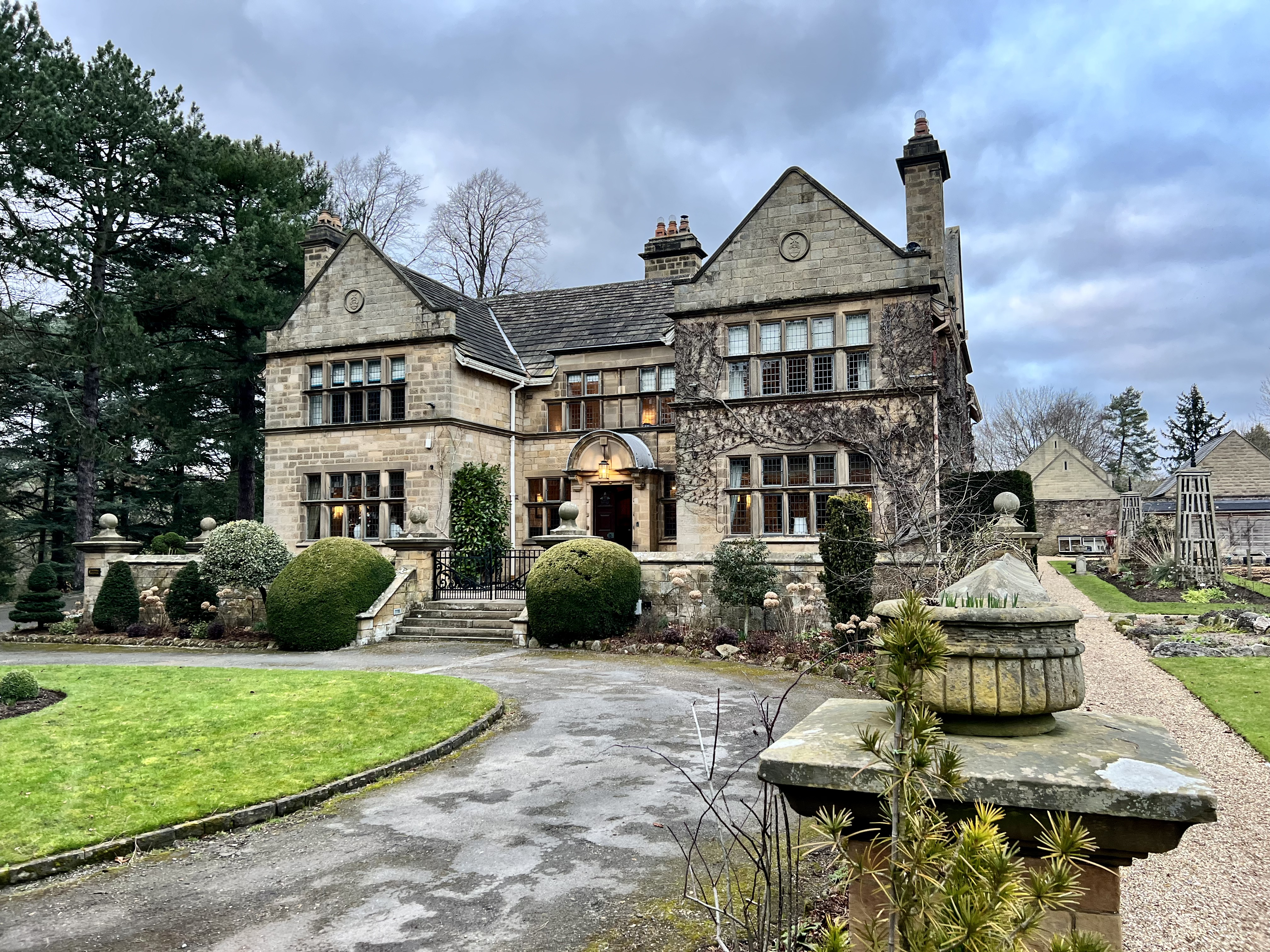
Baslow Hall of 1907

Francis Houlton Wrench LRIBA AMICE (29 August 1869 - 17 November 1939) was an architect based in Sheffield.

== History ==
He was born in 1869 in Baslow, Derbyshire, the son of Lieut-Colonel Edward Mason Wrench MVO, VD, FRCS (1833-1912) and Anne Eliza Kirk (1831-1920). He was educated at Drapers’ College, High Road, Tottenham and then University College, Sheffield from 1886 to 1889. He was then articled to Messrs. T. Meik & Sons from 1889 to 1890, then the Eyemouth Railway & Harbour company 1891–93. In 1895 he joined Sheffield Corporation Architects’ Department at a salary of £150 per annum.

He commenced independent practice in Sheffield in 1901 and was appointed LRIBA in 1910.

He married Georginia Charlotte Curll on 30 December 1892 in Edinburgh. They had two children:

- Georgina Annie Wrench (1894-1985)
- Francis Anthony Wrench (1897-1984)

He lived in Sheffield for many years.

He was junior engineer in the City Engineers’ Department. He lived at Upperthorpe until 1935 and was churchwarden at St Stephen's Church.

He was a member of the Sheffield Architects’ Society, a Freeman of the City of London, and a member of the Worshipful Company of Drapers of London.

He died at The Hall Cottage, East Markham in November 1939 and left an estate valued at £7,815.

== Works ==
- Abbeydale Road main sewer, Sheffield 1896
- Lock up shop, junction of St Philip’s Road and Netherthorpe Place, Sheffield 1902
- Baslow Hall 1907
- Memorial to Henry Bull, St Bartholomew's Church, Sheffield 1915
