= Listed buildings in Baslow and Bubnell =

Baslow and Bubnell is a civil parish in the Derbyshire Dales district of Derbyshire, England. The parish contains 30 listed buildings that are recorded in the National Heritage List for England. Of these, one is listed at Grade I, the highest of the three grades, one is at Grade II*, the middle grade, and the others are at Grade II, the lowest grade. The parish contains the villages of Baslow and Bubnell, and the surrounding countryside and moorland. Most of the listed buildings are houses, cottages and associated structures. The other listed buildings include a church and items in the churchyard, bridges, including a clapper bridge, a hotel, guide posts and guide stones, mile posts and a milestone, a boundary stone, a monument, and a telephone kiosk.

== Key ==
Grade	Criteria
I	Buildings of exceptional interest, sometimes considered to be internationally important
II*	Particularly important buildings of more than special interest
II	Buildings of national importance and special interest

== Buildings ==
Name and location	Photograph	Date	Notes	Grade
St Anne's Church; 53.24739°N 1.62411°W		13th century	The church has been altered and extended through the centuries, it was restored in 1852–53 by Joseph Paxton and G.H. Stokes, and the chancel was rebuilt in 1911. The church is built in sandstone, and consists of a nave with a clerestory, north and south aisles, a south porch, a chancel with a south vestry, and a steeple at the west end of the north aisle. The steeple has a tower with two stages, angle buttresses, a south doorway, clock faces with different dates and shapes on the north and east, and a broach spire with two tiers of lucarnes and a weathervane. The parapets on the body of the church are embattled with crocketed pinnacles.	II*
Churchyard Cross, St Anne's Church; 53.24773°N 1.62350°W	—	15th century (probable)	The remains of the medieval cross are in the churchyard of St Anne's Church. It is in gritstone, and consists of a square base, and an octagonal shaft about 1 metre (3 ft 3 in) high.	II
Sundial, St Anne's Church; 53.24725°N 1.62397°W	—	15th century (probable)	The sundial is in the churchyard, set on the steps of a medieval cross. It is in gritstone, with a base of four square steps, and has a square shaft with chamfered angles surmounted by a sundial without a dial. The upper parts date from the 18th century.	II
Bubnell House and Bubnell House East; 53.25302°N 1.63094°W		16th century (possible)	A house that was later extended and divided, it is in stone, partly rendered, and has a stone slate roof with coped gables and moulded kneelers. There are two storeys and a T-shaped plan, consisting of a main range of four bays, a gabled cross-wing, and a rear outshut. The doorway has a moulded surround and a hood mould. On the front are sash windows and a mullioned window with a stepped surround, and at the rear are a stair window and a cross window.	II
Baslow Bridge; 53.24780°N 1.62520°W		1618	The bridge carries a road over the River Derwent, it is in sandstone, and consists of three stepped round arches. The three triangular cutwaters rise to form refuges, the parapets have chamfered bases and copings, and the walls curve out at the ends. At the north end is a small toll booth that has a stone slate roof with a coped gable and moulded kneelers, and contains a doorway that has a lintel with a depressed ogee arch.	I
Bubnell Hall; 53.24971°N 1.62884°W		Early 17th century	A small country house in sandstone, with sill bands, and roofs of stone slate and Welsh slate with coped gables and moulded kneelers. The main part has three storeys and a half-H-shaped plan with projecting gabled bays. In the centre is a doorway with a moulded surround and a segmental pediment. The windows are mullioned, and in the right gable end are six-light mullioned and transomed windows. Recessed on the left is a later three-bay wing with sash windows, and on the east front is a doorway with a vermiculated rusticated surround.	II
Corner Cottage and Willow Cottage; 53.24772°N 1.62242°W	—	17th century (possible)	A pair of sandstone cottages that have stone slate roofs with coped gables and kneelers, and two storeys. Corner Cottage on the left has three bays, and a central doorway with a segmental pointed arch. To the right is s former shop window with pilasters and a cornice, and the other windows are cross windows. Willow Cottage to the right has two bays, a doorway with a bracketed hood, a single-light window above the doorway, and two-light mullioned windows in the right bay.	II
Greystones Cottage; 53.25080°N 1.61742°W		17th century	The cottage is in sandstone with a Welsh slate roof, two storeys, and a front of three bays. The doorway has a stone lintel and jambs, and stable-type doors. To its right is a sash window, and the other windows are mullioned.	II
Thatched Cottage; 53.24514°N 1.61254°W		17th century	The cottage is in sandstone, and has thatched roofs and stone coped gables. There is one storey and attics, and a garden front of two bays. The doorway has a massive lintel, and the windows are casements, those in the attics in eyebrow dormers. Inside, there is a cruck truss and an inglenook fireplace.	II
Monument, St Anne's Church; 53.24719°N 1.62399°W		1702	The monument in the churchyard consists of a gravestone in the form of a coffin. It is in gritstone on a rectangular chamfered base, and on the top is an inscription and relief carvings including an hourglass and skull and crossbones, and lifting rings in stone on the ends.	II
The Cavendish Hotel; 53.24571°N 1.61658°W		Early 18th century	The hotel is in sandstone, with quoins, and a stone slate roof with coped gables and kneelers. There are two storeys and symmetrical fronts of five bays. The south front has a central doorway with a moulded surround, and a hood mould. The windows are sashes, the window above the doorway with a round-arched head, a moulded surround, impost blocks, and a keystone. The north front has a central doorway with a plain surround and a bracketed hood, and in the roof are three round-arched dormers. In the west gable end is a canted bay window.	II
Clapper bridge 53.26399°N 1.58430°W		1742	The clapper bridge crossing Bar Brook consists of two monolithic gritstone slabs, each 3 metres (9.8 ft) long, 600 millimetres (24 in) wide and 250 millimetres (9.8 in) deep. They are set on rubble stone linings of the brook.	II
Guide post 53.29379°N 1.60445°W		18th century	The guide post on Big Moor consists of a square gritstone shaft about 3 feet (0.91 m) high. It is inscribed on the sides with the directions to Dronfield, Bakewell, Tideswell, and Sheffield.	II
Group of four guide stones 53.27518°N 1.58696°W		18th century (probable)	The guide stones on Big Moor consist of square gritstone shafts. They are much weathered and most of the inscriptions have been lost. On one stone are dates and the directions to Tideswell and Sheffield.	II
Heathy Lea; 53.24624°N 1.60282°W		18th century (possible)	A limestone house with sandstone dressings and stone slate roofs. There is an L-shaped plan, consisting of a front range of two storeys and four bays and four storeys at the rear, and two three-storey rear service wings. The porch has pilasters, a cornice and blocking course, and a bracketed hood. To its right is a small canted bay window, and in the outer bays are windows with segmental arched lights. The upper floor contains two-light mullioned windows.	II
Milestone, Clodhall Lane; 53.26148°N 1.58204°W		18th century	The milestone is on the southwest side of Clodhall Lane, and consists of a tapering gritstone slab with a curved top. It is inscribed with the distances to Manchester, Tideswell, and Chesterfield.	II
Barbrook Old Bridge; 53.24546°N 1.61326°W		Late 18th century	The bridge carries Church Lane over Bar Brook. It is in gritstone, and consists of three almost round arches. The bridge has triangular cutwaters and a plain parapet wall with rounded copings.	II
The Old Chapel; 53.24874°N 1.61946°W	—	1795	The chapel, later converted for residential use, is in sandstone, with quoins, sill bands, a moulded cornice, and a hipped Welsh slate roof. There are two storeys and a symmetrical front of three bays. The central doorway has a segmental arch, a quoined surround, voussoirs, and a keystone, and the windows are casements.	II
Bramley Farm; 53.25805°N 1.63541°W		1802	The farmhouse is in rendered sandstone, and has a stone slate roof with coped gables and kneelers. There are two storeys and a symmetrical front of three bays. The central doorway has a moulded surround, and the windows are sashes with channelled wedge lintels. On the west front is an oval initialled and dated panel.	II
Nelson Monument; 53.25282°N 1.58357°W		1805	The monument was erected to commemorate the victory of Nelson at the Battle of Trafalgar. It is in gritstone, and consists of a tapering obelisk-like shaft with a pitted finish, the top more steeply tapering and with a ball finial. The monument is about 10 feet (3.0 m) high, and is inscribed with the date of the battle.	II
Boundary stone 53.26317°N 1.58186°W		Early 19th century	The stone marks the boundary between the townships of Baslow and Holmesfield. It consists of a rectangular gritstone slab with the names of the townships painted.	II
Milepost, Bakewell Road; 53.24269°N 1.62552°W		Early 19th century	The milepost on Bakewell Road at the junction of the A619 road and B6012 road is in cast iron. It has a circular shaft surmounted by a cylinder with a moulded top divided into panels. The top is inscribed "LONDON", and in the lower panels are the distances to Manchester, Sheffield, Bakewell, Chatsworth, Edensor, and Ashford.	II
Milepost, Chesterfield Road; 53.24571°N 1.58727°W		Early 19th century	The milepost is on the south side of Chesterfield Road (A619 road) and is in cast iron. It has a circular shaft surmounted by a cylinder with a moulded top divided into panels. The top is inscribed "LONDON", and in the lower panels are the distances to Baslow, Chesterfield, Chatsworth, Bakewell, Manchester, and Buxton.	II
Milepost, Nether End; 53.24667°N 1.61110°W		Early 19th century	The milepost is on the south side of Chesterfield Road (A619 road) and is in cast iron. It has a circular shaft surmounted by a cylinder with a moulded top divided into panels. The top is inscribed "LONDON", and in the lower panels the distances have been overpainted.	II
Baslow Lodges, gates, piers and railings 53.24603°N 1.61006°W		1837	The lodges at the northern entrance to the grounds of Chatsworth House were designed by Jeffry Wyatville and completed by Joseph Paxton. They are in stone with paired pilasters, a moulded floor band, parapets, some of which are plain and others balustraded, and fluted finials. Each lodge has a block of two storeys and three bays, and a projecting single-storey porch with a doorway that has a moulded surround and a bracketed hood. The windows are sashes. Between the lodges are wrought iron gates and a screen, the central gates flanked by broad decorative pilasters with urns. The stone piers have sunk panels and pilasters, and are surmounted by caps with round arches and panels containing the relief of a snake.	II
Park Lodge; 53.24621°N 1.61107°W	—	1840–42	The house is in sandstone on a chamfered plinth, with a floor band, overhanging eaves, and a hipped and pitched roof of Westmorland slate. There are two storeys and an irregular plan. The garden front has two bays, and a porch with sidelights with a tripartite window to the left. In the upper floor is a central panelled pilaster, with a tripartite window on the right, and a pair of round-arched sash windows on the left. To the left of the front is a projecting wing, and to the right a recessed wing. In the entrance front is a porch and a doorway with a moulded surround and a keystone, above which is an arcaded balcony. Over the staircase is a square tower with a pyramidal roof.	II
Lychgate, St Anne's Church; 53.24783°N 1.62433°W		1890	The lychgate at the entrance to the churchyard has sandstone walls with chamfered copings, and a timber superstructure with openwork gables, and a tile roof with small gabled vents. On the bargeboards are carved inscriptions, and the gates are panelled with open trefoil motifs.	II
Baslow Hall; 53.25234°N 1.62585°W		1907	A small country house, later a hotel, in Jacobean style. It is in sandstone with moulded bands, a moulded eaves cornice, and a stone slate roof with coped gables and kneelers. There are two storeys and a half-H-shaped plan, with projecting gabled wings. Semicircular steps lead up to a central doorway that has a moulded surround with fleurons, a half-domed hood on moulded brackets, and a moulded keystone. The windows are mullioned and transomed, and in the gables are sunk roundels with crests.	II
Telephone kiosk 53.24784°N 1.62495°W		1935	The K6 type telephone kiosk on the approach to Baslow Bridge was designed by Giles Gilbert Scott. Constructed in cast iron with a square plan and a dome, it has three unperforated crowns in the top panels.	II
Guide stone 53.22260°N 1.56899°W		Undated	The guide stone on East Moor consists of a square gritstone post about 5 feet (1.5 m) high. It is inscribed with pointing hands and the directions to Chesterfield and Bakewell.	II
