= Tatenhill Airfield =

Airfield in Staffordshire, England

Tatenhill Airfield (RAF Tatenhill)
- IATA: none; ICAO: EGBM

Summary
- Airport type: Private
- Operator: Tatenhill Aviation Limited
- Location: Tatenhill, Staffordshire, England
- Elevation AMSL: 439 ft (134 m)
- Coordinates: 52°48′51″N 001°45′53″W
- Website: www.tatenhill.com

Map
- Location in Staffordshire

Runways
Direction	Length		Surface
Direction	ft	m	Surface
08/26		1,190	Asphalt
- Sources: UK AIP at NATS

Tatenhill Airfield (ICAO: EGBM) is a licensed airfield operated by Tatenhill Aviation Ltd. Its CAA Ordinary Licence (Number P813) allows flights for the public transport of passengers and for flying instruction as authorised by the licensee, Tatenhill Aviation. The three runways are paved, but one is no longer operational, and a second is used only occasionally. Running east–west, the main runway is the longest.

The airfield is part of the Needwood Survey, a 3000 hectare (12 sq miles) estate held by the Duchy of Lancaster in the area of the former Needwood Forest. The airfield lies 6 miles west of Burton upon Trent, Staffordshire, England, and is 11 miles south-west of Derby Airfield (a grass airfield with a flying school).

== History ==
=== Royal Air Force ===
Construction of the airfield was completed in 1941 during the Second World War, using the standard RAF specification of three co-intersecting runways. During the construction phase Miles Magister aircraft of No. 16 Elementary Flying Training School from RAF Burnaston used part of the airfield as a Relief Landing Ground. From 1941 until 1942 the airfield was a satellite for RAF Lichfield where No. 27 Operational Training Unit, Bomber Command used Vickers Wellington and Avro Anson aircraft. From 1942 until 1943 No. 15 (Pilots) Advanced Flying Training Unit RAF, Flying Training Command used the Airspeed Oxford. From 1943 until 1944 No. 5 (P) AFU used the Miles Master. From 1944 until 1945 No. 21 (P) AFU used the Airspeed Oxford, this was to be the last RAF flying unit. During 1944 No. 21 Maintenance Unit arrived after the disastrous explosion at their nearby station of RAF Fauld. The airfield finally housed the RAF School of Explosives from 1945 until 1947. The RAF had completely moved out by 1950 and the airfield became disused. Many of the buildings and structures from this period were extant in 2015.

=== Allied Breweries ===
In 1959 when the ground around the runways was returned to agriculture, the airfield lease was acquired by Allied Breweries of Burton-on-Trent for use in connection with their business, being a suitable location for many of their visitors to fly in directly and also as a base for the brewery to operate their own communications aircraft. During this time they operated: de Havilland Dove, Beech Baron, Beech Queen Air and Beech King Air aircraft. The flying operation ended in 1985.

== Current Use ==
=== Tatenhill Aviation ===
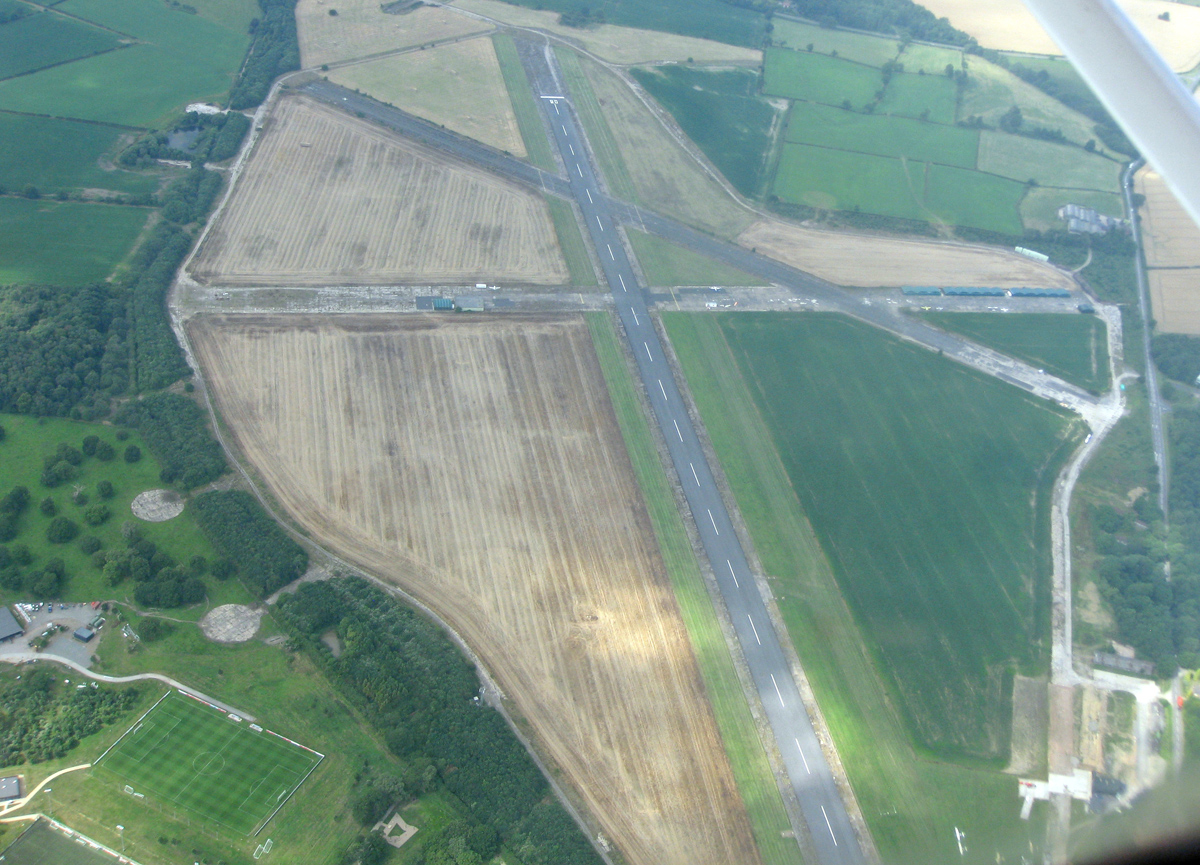
Tatenhill Airfield looking west in 2014.

In 1987, the airfield was taken over by Tatenhill Aviation for General Aviation use and gradually built up to become a viable operation. The field was licensed in the 1990s and a flying school started.

Tatenhill is now a medium-sized general aviation airfield, the north–south (17/35) and southwest–northeast (04/22) runways are now only used for aircraft parking with runway 17/35 featuring a complex of hangars, whereas the east–west (08/26) runway remains operational. A wartime Bellman hangar located at the northeast corner remains in use for aircraft servicing and repairs. The 08/26 runway is licensed for use at 1,190 m (3,904 ft) length and can handle a wide range of general aviation aircraft, including jets. This runway also has lighting, enabling night flying. A non-directional beacon is installed but there is no let-down procedure. The grass taxiway parallel to the operational runway is used in summer only, because of waterlogging.

Based at the airfield are Tatenhill Flying School, who operate aircraft from Tatenhill Aviation such as the Piper PA-24, Piper PA-28, Cessna 152 and Bellanca Decathlon; and the Merlin Flying Club (Rolls-Royce plc employees') who moved here when Hucknall Aerodrome was closed on 1 March 2015: they operate Cessna 150 Aerobat, Robin DR.200, Auster AOP.9 and Pitts Special aircraft. Central Flight Training school are resident, and provide instructor, commercial, multi-engine and instrument rating training: they operate Piper PA-24, Beech Duchess and Diamond DA-42 aircraft. Each July the airfield hosts a charity fly-in organized by East Staffordshire Flying Club which is also based here.

There is now a helicopter training school, H Helis based at Tatenhill. They provide training in a Schweizer S300CBi.

Many private owners base their aircraft at the airfield. The Midlands Air Ambulance, currently operating a Eurocopter EC145 helicopter, is also based at the airfield. There is a busy M3 aircraft engineering business carrying out aircraft servicing and repairs. There is also a JAR145 approved avionics business. Both Jet A1 and 100LL fuel are available.

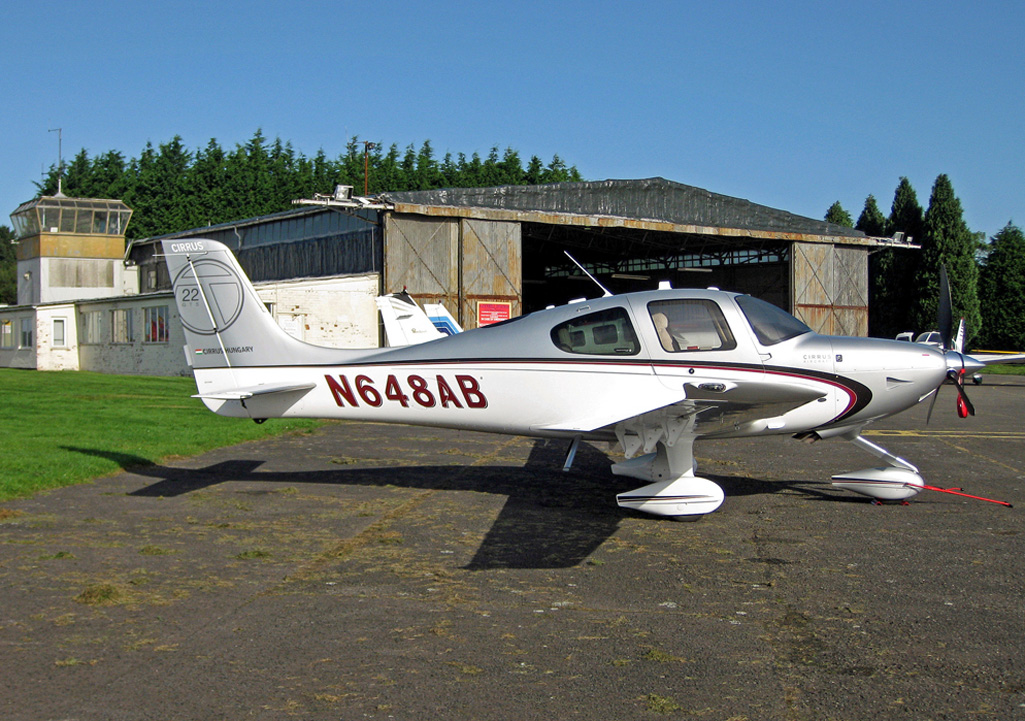
Tatenhill airfield in 2012 showing the Control tower and wartime Bellman Hangar. In the foreground is a Cirrus SR22T visiting for maintenance
