= Baslow Hall =

House in Baslow, Derbyshire, England

Coordinates: 53°15′8.2″N 1°37′33.5″W

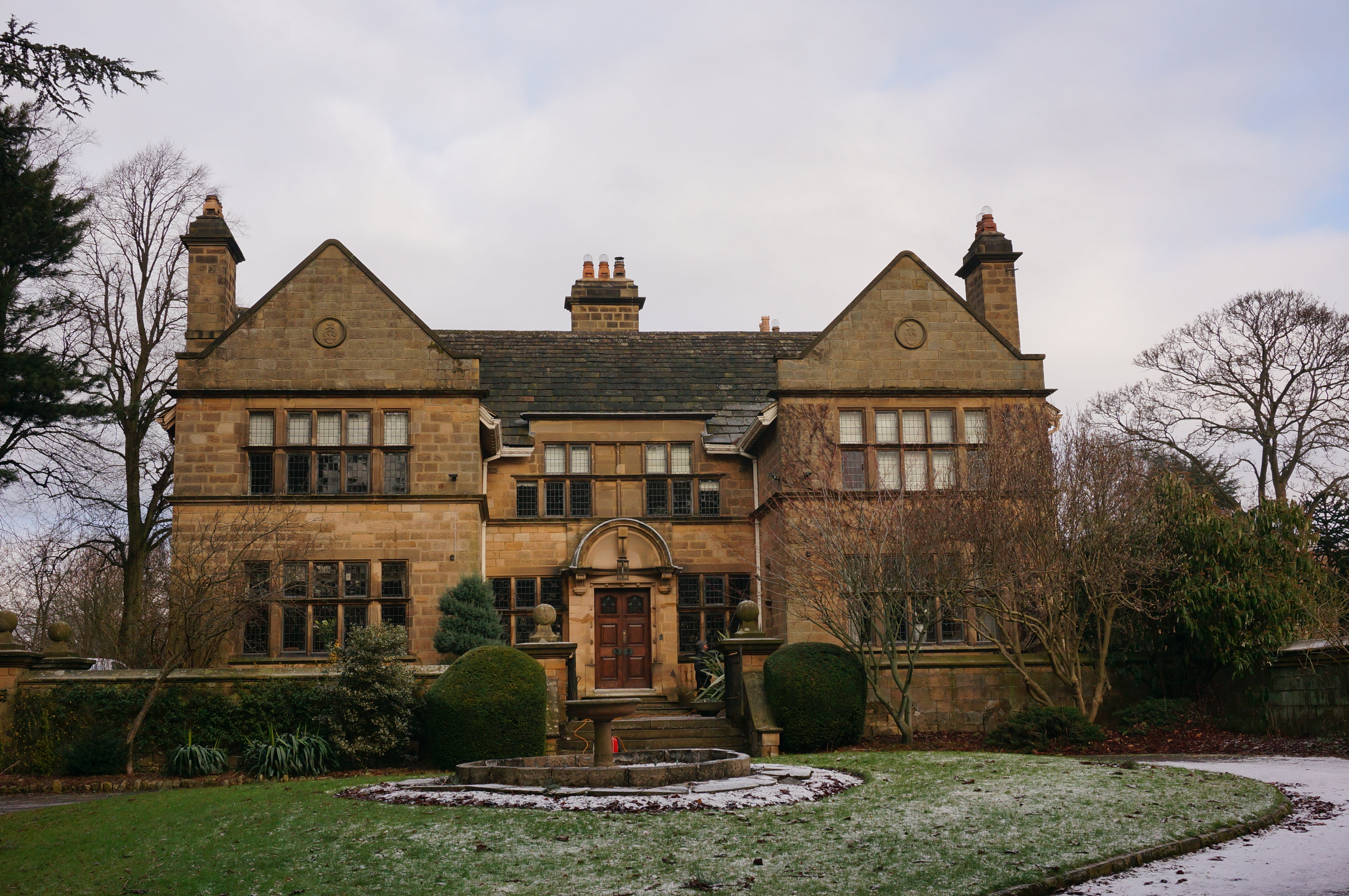
- Baslow Hall

- Location within Derbyshire

General information
- Location: Calver Road, Baslow
- Completed: 1907

Design and construction
- Architect: Francis Houlton Wrench
- Designations: Grade II listed

Baslow Hall is a Grade II listed building in Baslow, Derbyshire.

== History ==
Baslow Hall, just off Calver Road, was built in 1907 to the designs of the architect Francis Houlton Wrench of Sheffield on land bought from the Duke of Rutland for Mrs. Stockdale, widow of the Rev. J. Stockdale. The construction work caused some damage to the footpath along Calver Road, which the council refused to repair.

The hall was put up for sale in May 1911 when it was described as "a commodious Residence in the Tudor Style of Architecture, recently built for the owner, Mrs. Stockdale, with all modern conveniences, standing in its own grounds of about 8 acres". It was still being advertised for sale in August 1912, but by 1913 the house had been purchased by Gertrude de Ferranti and Sebastian Ziani de Ferranti, the radio and electrical pioneer and inventor. They installed a 25hp oil engine, running a private electrical plant until 1923, which powered many electrical devices including an electric laundry, a lawn-mower and lighting the tennis court with electric lights. The de Ferranti lamp posts still line the drive today.

After his death in 1930, the house was purchased by Mrs. McCreagh-Thornhill of Stanton Hall, Stanton in Peak as a wedding present for her grandson, Humphrey Bache Christopher Davie who occupied it until the Second World War.

The house was then let to George Kenning who occupied it until 1955 and his son Frank Kenning died in the garage with a shot wound to his head in 1956.

It was sold again, this time to T.C. Harrison, a second-hand car salesman, and later sold to a retired London stockbroker, Mr. Clixby. In 1988 it was purchased by the Fischer family and opened as a restaurant and hotel.

== See also ==
- Listed buildings in Baslow and Bubnell
