= Yorkshire and Derbyshire Cricket League =

Regional English Cricket League

The Yorkshire and Derbyshire Cricket League
- Countries: England
- Format: Limited overs cricket
- First edition: 1969 (Founded)
- Tournament format: League
- Number of teams: 10 (Division One)
- Current champion: Sheffield Centralians CC
- Most successful: Parkhead CC (12 titles)
- Website: https://yorksderby.play-cricket.com

The Yorkshire and Derbyshire Cricket League (YDCL) is a Saturday League, founded in 1969. The league administers cricket clubs that participate in its League, Cup and Trophy competitions and is in formal association with the cricket boards of Yorkshire and Derbyshire, and the League Cricket Conference.

The league consists of 3 divisions. Each division contains a maximum of 10 teams. Clubs participating in the league are mainly from the Sheffield region of South Yorkshire, and the rest are clubs from North East Derbyshire and the Peak District.

Since the formation of the league in 1969, the YDCL has witnessed Parkhead Cricket Club build an almost unassailable tally of 12 league championship titles (not including the shared championship title with Stainborough Cricket Club in 1971). Parkhead won their first YDCL championship in 1970, one year after the formation of the league, and maintained a high standard throughout the league's history, culminating with their most recent win in the season of 2019. Hundall follow with 8 championship titles to their name.

South Yorkshire Cricket Clubs in 2021.
Derbyshire Cricket Clubs in 2021.

== Past winners ==
- Year	Champions
  1969	Stainborough
  1970	Parkhead
  1971	Stainborough and Parkhead (Note: Shared title.)
  1972	Old Edwardians
  1973	Old Edwardians
  1974	Hathersage
  1975	Hathersage and Stainborough
  1976	Parkhead
  1977	Parkhead
  1978	Stainborough
  1979	Parkhead
  1980	Sheffield Collegiate
  1981	Hathersage
  1982	Sheffield Collegiate
  1983	Hathersage
  1984	Old Edwardians
  1985	Hathersage
  1986	Hathersage
  1987	Parkhead
  1988	Sheffield Centralians
- Year	Champions
  1989	Old Edwardians
  1990	Old Edwardians
  1991	Parkhead
  1992	Old Edwardians
  1993	Hundall
  1994	Sheffield Works Department
  1995	Parkhead
  1996	Sheffield Works Department
  1997	Sheffield Collegiate
  1998	Hundall
  1999	Hundall
  2000	Hundall
  2001	Hundall
  2002	Hundall
  2003	Hundall
  2004	Hundall
  2005	Sheffield Works Department
  2006	Stanton in the Peak
  2007	Parkhead
  2008	Parkhead
- Year	Champions
  2009	Sheffield Works Department
  2010	Millhouses Works
  2011	Holmesfield
  2012	Sheffield University Staff
  2013	Holmesfield
  2014	Parkhead
  2015	Parkhead
  2016	Holmesfield
  2017	Hollinsend Methodist
  2018	Hollinsend Methodist
  2019	Parkhead
  2020	League suspended (Note: Coronavirus pandemic)
  2021	Totley Bent
  2022	De La Salle Sheffield
  2023	Waverley
  2024	Sheffield Centralians
  2025	Sheffield Centralians

== Performance by season from 2006 ==
Key
Gold	Champions
Blue	Left League
Red	Relegated

Performance by season, from 2006 to 2025.
Club	2006	2007	2008	2009	2010	2011	2012	2013	2014	2015	2016	2017	2018	2019	2020	2021	2022	2023	2024	2025
Allama Iqbal																				4
Apperknowle					8	10		8	9											
Ashford in the Water	7	7	8	10					10				8							
Calver	10	10	9				10													
Coal Aston																				6
De La Salle Sheffield	5	6	7	8	6	6	6	3	4	6	6	6	3	3		5	1	5	8	
Grindleford								10												
Hallam										9		7	10				8	6		
Hathersage	8	11		7	7	8	9				5	3	9	8		9				
Hollinsend Methodist						5	3	4	3	3	3	1	1							
Holmesfield (Note: Holmesfield resigned from the League after the 2016 season.)	6	3	2	4	3	1	5	1	2	2	1									
Hundall	3	5	6	9		9	7	9					4							
Millhouses (Note: Millhouses became Millhouses Works after the 2009 season.)	12																			
Millhouses Works					1	2														
Notton Challengers																		10		
Parkhead (Note: Parkhead resigned from the League after the 2019 season.)	4	1	1	2	2	3	4	5	1	1	2	2	2	1			7	9		
Ridgeway				3	9													8	4	7
Sheffield Centralians	11				5	7	8	7	6	10		5	6	7		8	6	4	1	1
Sheffield Civil Service									7	7	7	10		10			9			
Sheffield Collegiate		9	10								8			6						
Sheffield Medics														9		7	3	7	5	2
Sheffield Spartans																				8
Sheffield Super Kings																3	5	2	2	5
Sheffield Transport																4	2	3	6	3
Sheffield University Staff		4	5	6	4	4	1	2	8	4	4	9		5		10			7	
Sheffield Works Department (Note: Sheffield Works Department resigned from the League after the 2009 season.)	2	2	3	1																
Stanton in the Peak	1	8	4	5																
Stocksbridge	9	12					2	6	5	5	9	4	7	2		2				
Super Strikers																6	4			
Totley Bent (Note: Totley Sports & Social became Totley Bent after the 2016 season.)												8	5	4		1	10			
Totley Sports & Social										8	10									
Waverley																		1	3	
References															(Note: Coronavirus pandemic forced all formal competitive sporting activities to be suspended.)					
