= Joe Kelly (racing driver) =

Irish racing driver (1913–1993)

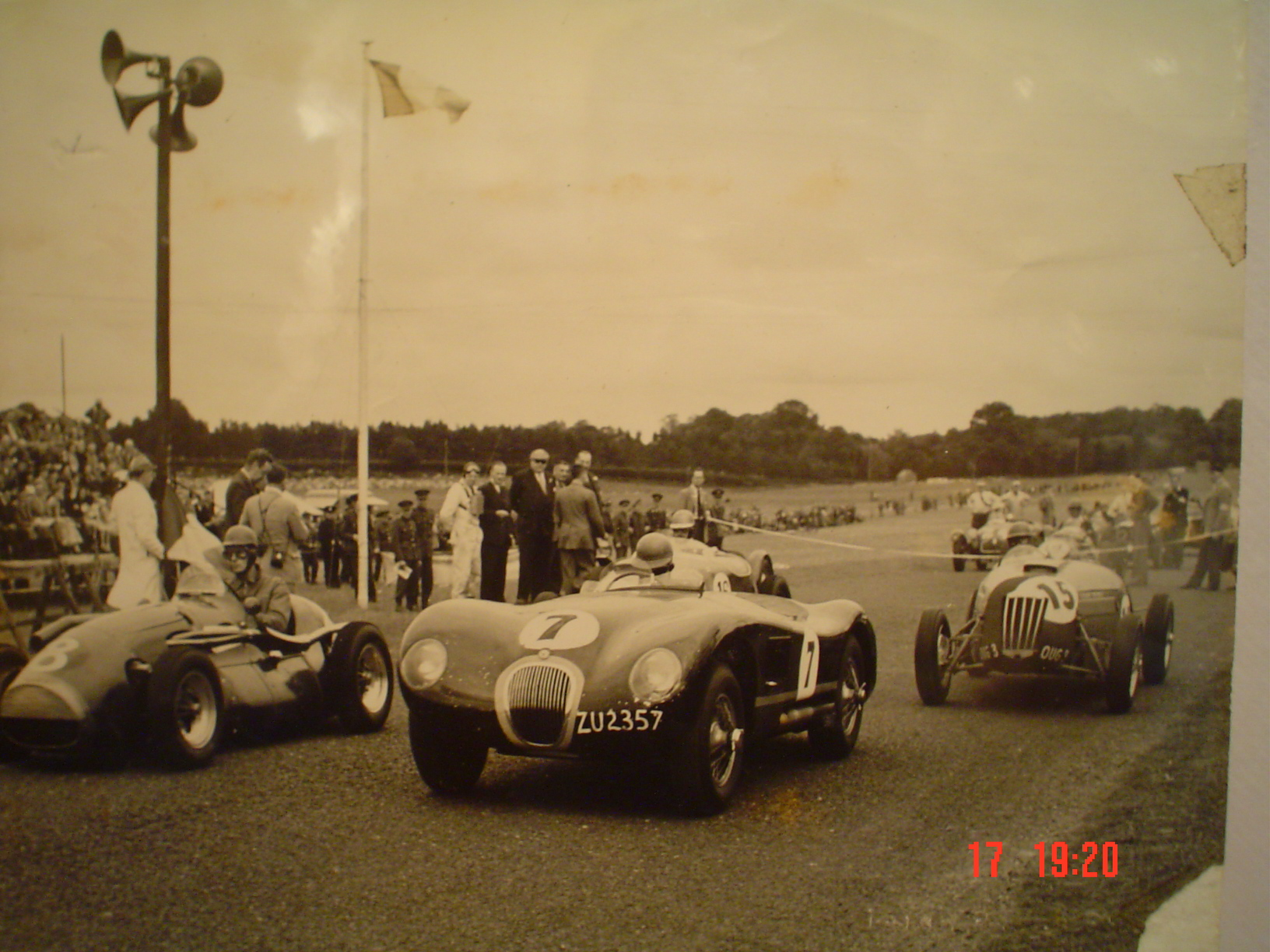
- Kelly driving his Jaguar C-Type
- Born: Joseph Michael Kelly; 13 March 1913; Dublin, Ireland
- Died: 28 November 1993 (aged 80); Neston, Cheshire, England

Formula One World Championship career
- Nationality: (Republic of Ireland) Irish
- Active years: 1950 – 1951
- Team: privateer Alta
- Entries: 2
- Championships: 0
- Wins: 0
- Podiums: 0
- Career points: 0
- Pole positions: 0
- Fastest laps: 0
- First entry: 1950 British Grand Prix
- Last entry: 1951 British Grand Prix

Joseph Michael Kelly (13 March 1913 – 28 November 1993) was an Irish racing driver and businessman, who entered into the 1950 and 1951 British Grand Prix.

== Biography ==
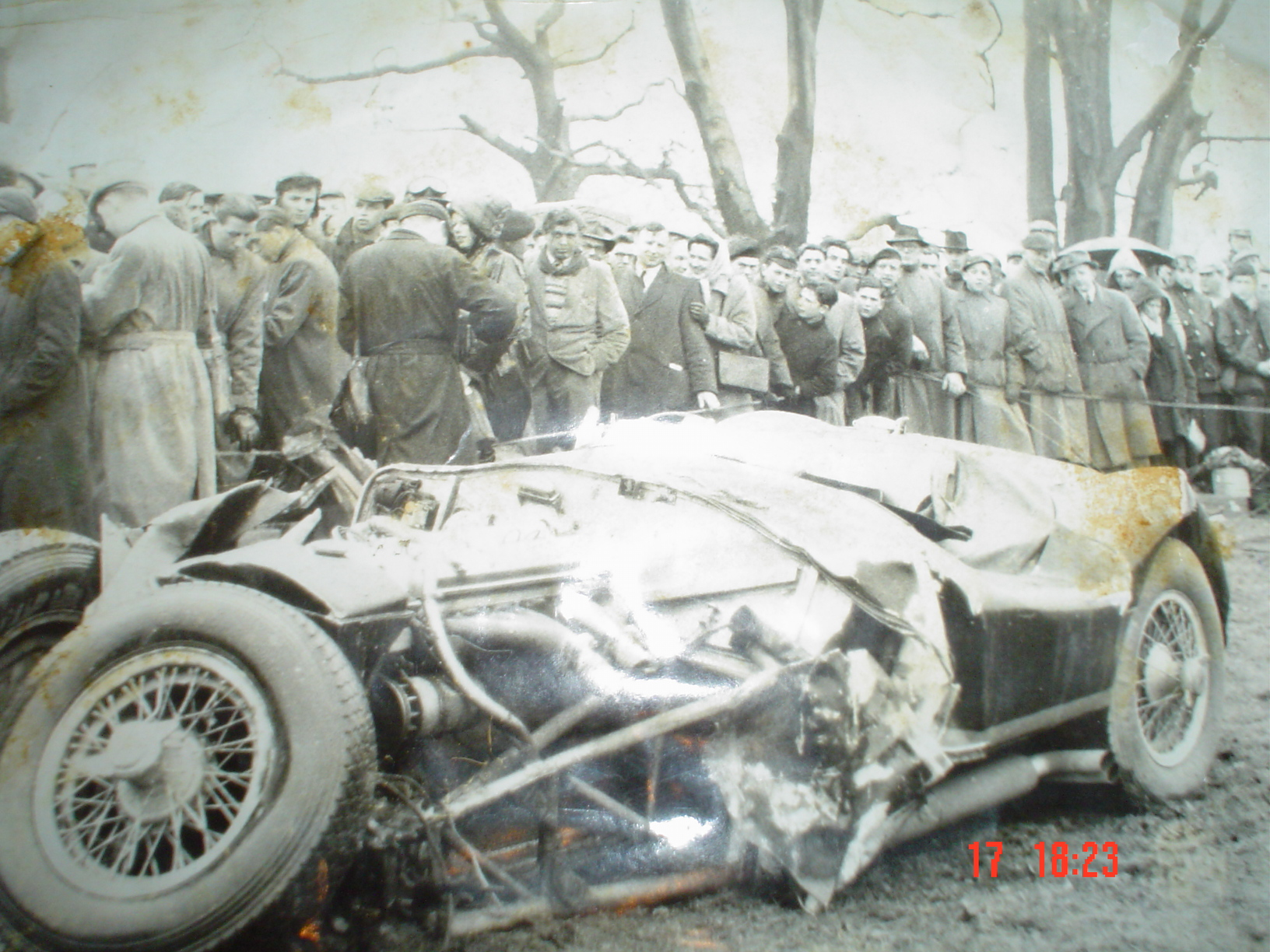
Joe Kelly's Jaguar after his crash at Oulton Park

=== Racing career ===
By profession, Kelly was a motor dealer from Dublin and he used the profits from this business to indulge his interest in motorsport. He raced a Maserati 6CM on 20 August 1949, during the 1949 BRDC International Trophy meeting at Silverstone Circuit. It was the first race meeting to use the former airfield's perimeter roadways, rather than the main runways. The event was held that day over two heats of 20 laps and one final of 30 laps of the Grand Prix circuit. The final was won by Italian Alberto Ascari driving a Ferrari; Ascari would go on to win the Formula One World Championship twice. The race meeting was marred by the death of St. John Horsfall in an accident during the final race.

In 1950, Kelly – using his own Alta GP car, the last built – participated in the 1950 and 1951 British rounds of the Formula One World Championship. He was not classified in the results of either race, scoring no championship points and his best grid position was 18th place, but his persistence with the Alta GP car paid off in 1952 with third place in the Ulster Trophy at Dundrod. His Alta was later modified to accept a naturally aspirated Bristol straight-6 engine to become the Irish Racing Automobile. He also owned and raced a Jaguar C-Type sports car which he raced in Ireland at "The Curragh", known throughout the world as the home of Irish horse racing, and could also boast of having no less than two motor racing circuits in the late 1940s and early fifties. Known as the "Short" circuit and the "Big" circuit, both played host to great entries and attracted huge crowds. The Short circuit was first used in 1947 and catered for both car and motorcycle events. It was used until the late fifties, whereas the "Big" circuit was the venue for the famous International Wakefield Trophy car races which were held annually from 1949 to 1954. At a June meeting the lap record was broken by Kelly, this time driving a Maserati. This was the first purpose-built racing car to compete at the Curragh. Up until then the entries consisted mostly of MGs and home or garage built "specials". The crowd had become a great fan of Kelly and he certainly gave them a demonstration of high speed racing that day. The record which he set that day was to remain unbroken until 1954, when he again shattered it by almost 10 mph, this time in a Ferrari sports car.

Kelly's own full-time driving career came to an end in 1955, following a serious accident at the Oulton Park circuit. However, he did compete in some hill climbs in later life driving Porsche and Ferrari sports cars, at Wicklow in Ireland. His Jaguar C-Type is still raced in historic meetings around the world, as is his Ferrari Monza.

=== Business life ===
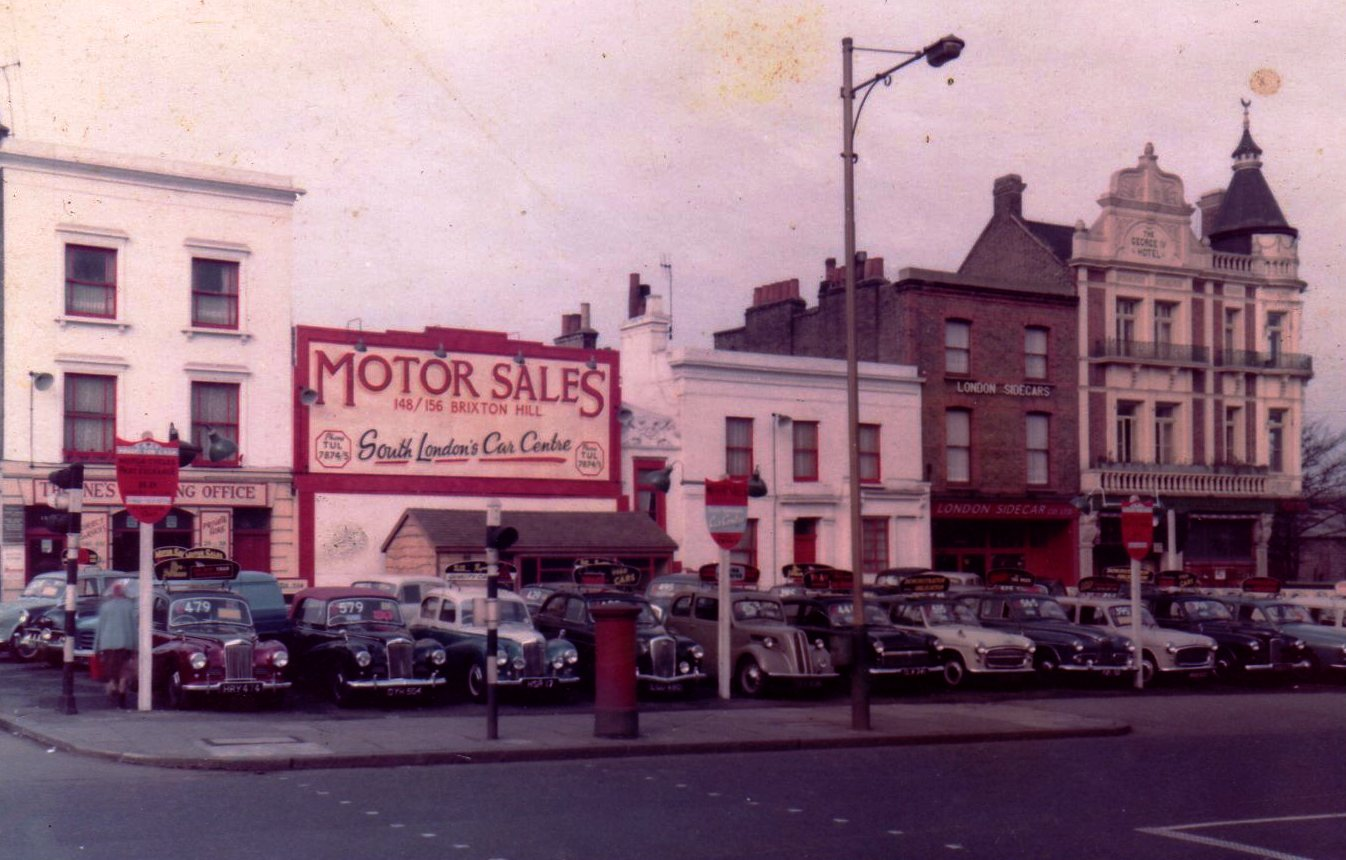

Kelly was first a businessman; his racing took second place to making money. His car dealing and property trading came high on his list of priorities; he owned many very famous homes during his property dealing days in the 1970s and 80's in Ireland and England. He was very well known in his native Dublin. He hit the Irish Press in the Fifties due to being the first Irishman to get a royal invitation to the first British Grand Prix at Silverstone. Following his withdrawal from racing, Kelly concentrated on his business interests, which included the Irish Ferrari concession.

=== Collections and later life ===
After 1955 and the crash at Oulton Park, Kelly worked on building up car showrooms in England, then in 1969 sold them all and decided to move back to Athy, Ireland. This is where he started his property portfolio which resulted in Kelly owning some of the most impressive estates in the country, including Old Conna Hill near Dublin.

In the late 1970s and 80s, Kelly started a collection of rare and expensive cars which included Lamborghini, Ferrari and Rolls-Royce.

Whilst he spent most of his life in Ireland, Kelly died in Neston, Cheshire, England.

== Complete Formula One World Championship results ==
(key)

Year	Entrant	Chassis	Engine	1	2	3	4	5	6	7	8	WDC	Points
1950	Joe Kelly	Alta GP	Alta L4 s	GBR; NC	MON	500	SUI	BEL	FRA	ITA		NC	0
1951	Joe Kelly	Alta GP	Alta L4 s	SUI	500	BEL	FRA	GBR; NC	GER	ITA	ESP	NC	0
