= George Kenning (entrepreneur) =

Motor car distributor

Sir George Kenning
- Born: 21 May 1880; Clay Cross, Derbyshire, England
- Died: 6 February 1956 (aged 75); Stumperlowe Hall, Sheffield, England
- Occupation: Entrepreneur in the motor trade
- Known for: Kenning car dealerships and vehicle hire business
- Notable work: Early pioneer of providing motor trade services

Sir George Kenning (21 May 1880 – 6 February 1956) was an English entrepreneur who grew the family business from a corner shop to a nationwide car dealership that employed around 2,000 people. Kenning became one of the early pioneers in selling, servicing and financing the use of motor vehicles by industry, commerce and individuals. At the time of his death, the firm had a turnover of £20m. Kenning was also active as a local councillor and benefactor. He was knighted in 1943.

== Life ==
Kenning was born in 1880. His father Frank had started a door-to-door hardware retail business two years before. By 1891, he was helping his father in his business which was now based at a hardware shop on the high street in Clay Cross, but also had a stall at Chesterfield market.

== Business career ==
Kenning started his own paraffin distribution business in 1901, distributing with a horse-drawn cart. In 1908, he launched two new businesses: hiring bicycles to Shell-Mex & BP travelling salesmen and hiring horses to pull BP wagons. These were pioneering examples of what is now termed "contract hire". This hire business continued to grow until, in 1970, the Kennings Group had a hire fleet of 5,000 vehicles.

In 1910, Kenning started his first motor sales agency, for BSA Royal Enfield motorcycles. His first motor car agency was with Ford in 1916. Three years later Kenning became the sole agency for Morris Motors in Derbyshire. He became a long-term business associate and friend of another pioneer of widespread car ownership, Lord Nuffield, the manufacturer of Morris cars. Alongside car agencies, he set up supporting businesses like forecourt petrol sales car servicing and car spares sales. Soon after that, he won the first agency granted by the truck-making firm Dennis.

In 1925, he began an association with Reeve Burgess, a firm that made truck and bus bodies for mounting on lorry frames. Vehicle-building became another subsidiary business of the Kenning empire, producing milk floats in Shrewsbury and road tankers in Ossett. Another subsidiary business was car valeting and in 1939, sophisticated valeting equipment was installed at both the London and Sheffield sites.

Kenning became the first agents in the UK for Lucas electrical components and the first for the Tyresoles system of remoulding tyres for longer life. He also set up the Midlands Counties Motor Finance Company. The subsidiary businesses around tyres started by Kenning were subsequently developed and became one of the largest suppliers of car, commercial and earth mover tyres in the country. Kennings also operated three tyre remoulding factories and marketed their own label, Fisk and John Bull, tyres.

Kennings was registered as a private company with a capital of £100,000 in 1930; in 1939 it converted to a public company.

== Public service ==
George Kenning was very active in public life. He served on the now defunct Clay Cross Urban District council as well as being a councillor and alderman on Derbyshire County Council. Kenning could have stood for election as a Liberal member of parliament but he refused to be nominated.

As a Justice of the Peace, he served on the bench of the local magistrates court and he was a member of the Chesterfield Hospital Board of Management. He was an active member of the Methodist Church in Clay Cross as well as being a member of the freemasons.

Kenning provided a recreation ground for use by the people of Clay Cross. This was named "Kenning Park" and is located on Holmgate Road to the west of the town. As a result of his contribution to public life, the-then Alderman George Kenning, JP, was awarded a knighthood ("Knight Bachelor") in the 1943 New Year Honours "for public services in Derbyshire".

== Properties ==
=== Business premises ===
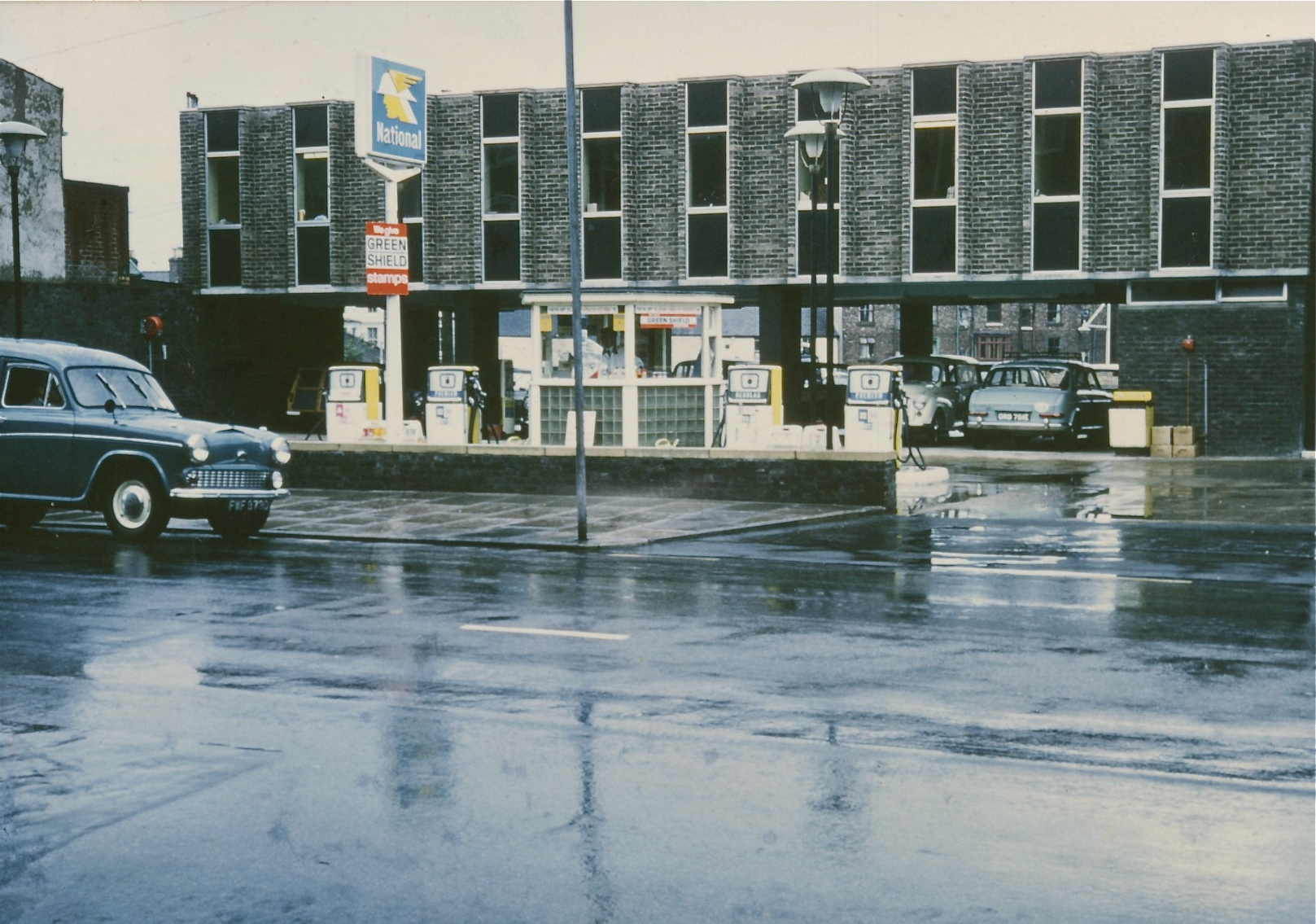
The National Garage in Bridlington was Kennings.

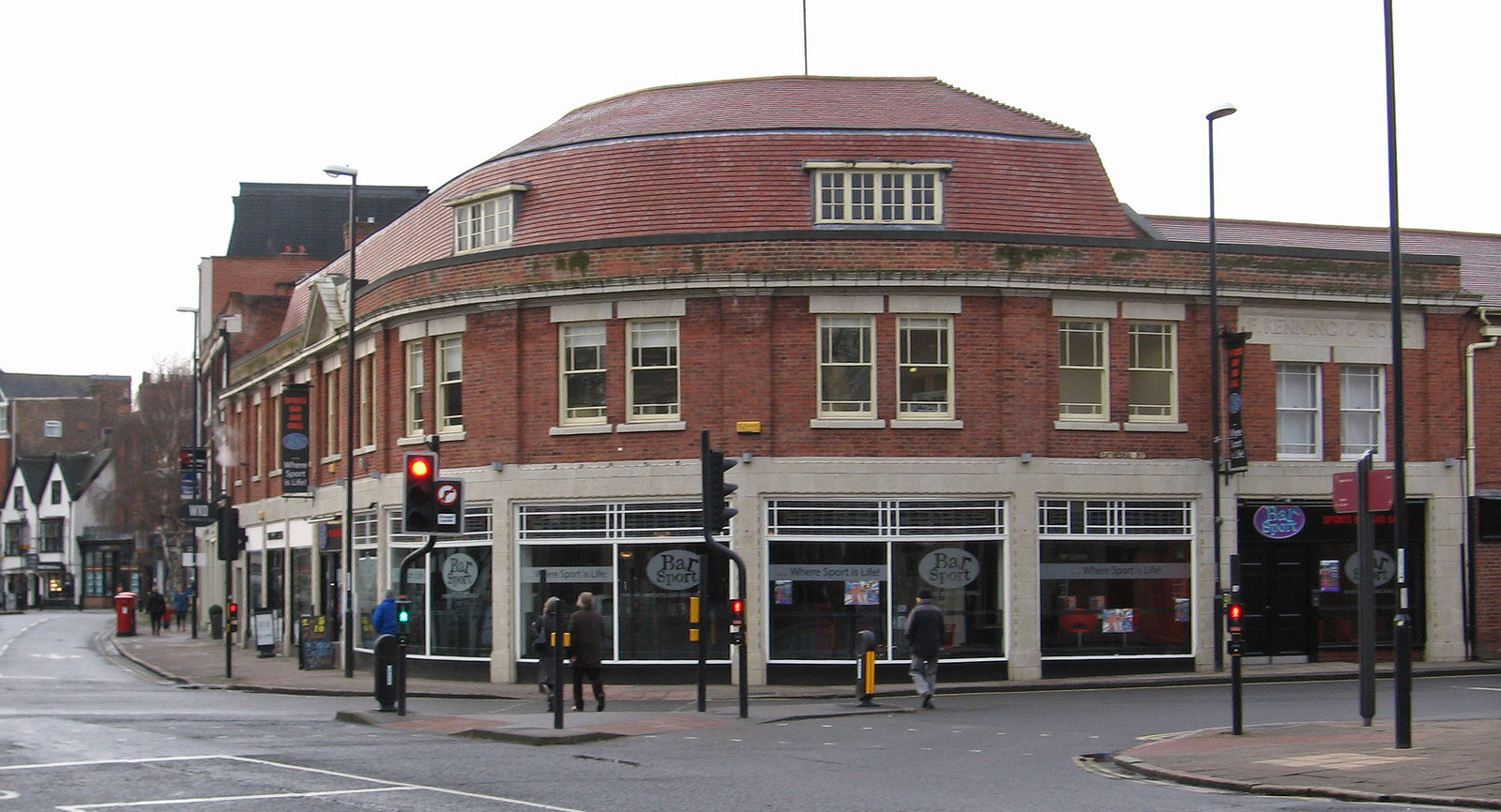
Former Kennings car showroom on Queen Street, Derby

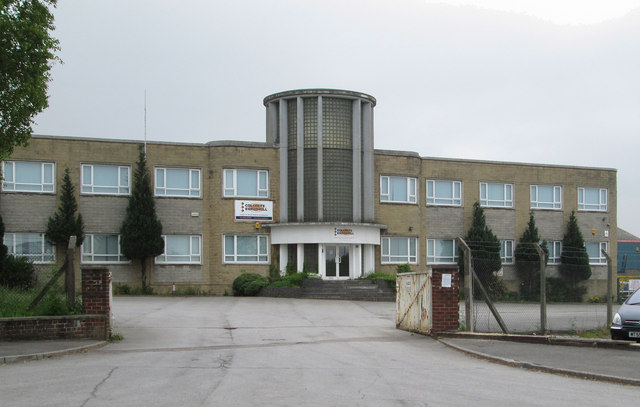
Former Kennings offices on High Street, Clay Cross

Kenning had a large number of business premises. They ranged from car showrooms in city centres to tyre factories and office blocks on the outskirts of towns. The showrooms in Leadmill Road, Sheffield and Queen Street, Derby occupied what would now be called "prime retail" sites in city-centre locations. They were architect-designed and followed the Art Deco architecture style that was prevalent at the time of building.

The premises in Queen Street, Derby were the subject of a special ceremony when they opened in 1930. Kenning had his first branch in Derby in 1926, but spent £20,000 on building "Morris House" on a more prestigious site. As well as a car showroom for Morris cars, the depot incorporated garages, repair shops and stores. It was opened by George's business associate and friend, Sir William Morris (later Lord Nuffield), who built cars that were affordable to the middle classes at his works in Cowley, Oxford. The offices in Clay Cross and the HQ Manor Office building on Old Road in Chesterfield were also notable for their architecture.

Mention also needs to be made of the premises in Clay Cross where the Kenning empire first started. Frank Kenning's first shop (selling hardware) is at the junction of King Street with the southern end of High Street. The car service building is on a road named Kenning Street. There is also an Art Deco style office building (now the Tower Business Park) towards the northern end of High Street.

=== Residences ===
George lived in a variety of houses during his lifetime, starting in Clay Cross and died at Stumperlowe Hall in Sheffield in 1956. Prior to that he lived at Baslow Hall in the Peak District. The Kenning family is also associated with Eastwood Grange in Ashover and Great Longstone Hall.

== Death and legacy ==
By the time of his death in 1956, Kenning had the largest set of car dealerships in Derbyshire and he had 80 dealerships spread over 18 counties. The business employed 2,000 people. At the time of Kenning's death, the firm had a turnover of £20m.

500 people attended Kenning's funeral. Obituaries appeared in The Times, and the Derbyshire Times. His widow bought Stumperlowe Hall in Sheffield the following year and this house would become a family residence.

The petrol forecourt business started by Kenning was expanded by his successors; Kenning Motor Group built the Motorway Service sites at Strensham M5 and Anderton M61. As at 2015, the Kenning family's interests in the motor trade has spanned 4 generations, starting with Sir George's father, Frank. Note that all but the first generation had a family member named George.

Subsequent to his death, George Kenning commissioned two official biographies.

The National Portrait Gallery, London has portraits of George Kenning from July 1943 and December 1947.
