= Joe Fry =

British racing driver (1915–1950)

- Born: 26 October 1915; Winterbourne, Gloucestershire, England
- Died: 29 July 1950 (aged 34); Blandford Camp, Dorset, England

Formula One World Championship career
- Nationality: (United Kingdom) British
- Active years: 1950
- Team: non-works Maserati
- Entries: 1
- Championships: 0
- Wins: 0
- Podiums: 0
- Career points: 0
- Pole positions: 0
- Fastest laps: 0
- First entry: 1950 British Grand Prix

Joseph Gibson Fry (26 October 1915 – 29 July 1950) was a British racing driver. He became the primary driver for the Shelsley Special "Freikaiserwagen", created by his cousin David Fry and Hugh Dunsterville, with help from Dick Caesar. The original car was built in Bristol in 1936 and featured an Anzani engine which was replaced in 1937 by a Blackburne engine. Joe set a number of hill records during the late 1930s including an unofficial outright record at Prescott when he climbed in 47.62 seconds in the 1,100 c.c. Freikaiserwagen, on 27 August 1938. At the outbreak of World War Two he held both the blown and unblown 1,100 c.c. records at Shelsley Walsh Hill Climb in 41.52 and 42.58 seconds respectively.

Fry finished second in class, for racing cars up to 1,100 c.c., in the Freikaiserwagen at the Brighton Speed Trials in 1947. He drove the car to a class victory at Brighton the following year recording a faster time. He won the class again at Brighton in 1949 reducing his time yet again.

At Blandford hillclimb on 28 May 1949: "J.G. Fry made f.t.d. in the 650 lb., twin Marshall-blown V-twin Freikaiserwagen." His winning time was 31.13 seconds.

At Bouley Bay Hill Climb, Jersey, on 21 July 1949, Fry finished first in class but overall a runner-up to Sydney Allard, at which point Fry led the British Hill Climb Championship. At the final round at Prescott he was just one point behind Sydney Allard, but he had mechanical problems and slumped to fourth overall behind Allard, Poore and Moss in the final standings.

Fry was killed at the wheel of the Freikaiserwagen at the 1950 Blandford hillclimb, less than two months after driving a Maserati 4CL in the 1950 British Grand Prix at Silverstone. Raymond Mays said: "The death of Joe Fry, from injuries received while practicing for a Blandford hill-climb, was a great blow to me and to British motor sport in general."

A memorial race, the Joe Fry Trophy, was held between 1952 and 1954 at Castle Combe Circuit.

== Bibliography ==
The book of the complete history of "Freikaiserwagen" is called "Freik – The Private Life of the Freikaiserwagen" by Rob and Hugh Dunsterville published in 2008 and reprinted in 2009.

== Complete Formula One World Championship results ==
(key)

Year	Entrant	Chassis	Engine	1	2	3	4	5	6	7	WDC	Points
1950	Joe Fry	Maserati 4CL	Maserati Straight-4	GBR; 10*	MON	500	SUI	BEL	FRA	ITA	NC	0

* Indicates shared drive with Brian Shawe-Taylor
