= Circuit des Nations =

Street racing circuit

- Track layout (circa 1946)
- Location: Geneva, Switzerland
- Coordinates: 46°13′14″N 6°8′33″E
- Opened: 1936; 90 years ago
- Closed: 30 July 1950; 76 years ago
- Major events: Geneva Grand Prix (1948–1950); Grand Prix des Nations (1946–1950); Swiss motorcycle Grand Prix (1938–1950)
- Length: 2.800 km (1.740 mi)

The Circuit des Nations ("Circuit of the Nations") was a street circuit between Lake Geneva and the Palais des Nations in Geneva, Switzerland. It hosted the Grand Prix de Nations, similar to a Formula One race; the Grand Prix de Genève, similar to a Formula Two race; and various championship events. The first Grand Prix de Genève was held in Meyrin in 1931 and won by Marcel Lehoux, racing for Bugatti.

== Geneva race track (Switzerland) ==
The Geneva race track was established in the 1930s between the lake (Geneva) and the Nations square following the closure of the nearby Circuit de Meyrin.

The circuit hosted some local motorcycling events before holding its first international event, the 1938 Swiss motorcycle Grand Prix. Racing at the track was suspended during World War II and international competition resumed in 1946 when a number of Grand-Prix races on both two and four wheels were held on this track. In total, five major car races and four major motorcycle races happened on this track between 1938 and 1950.

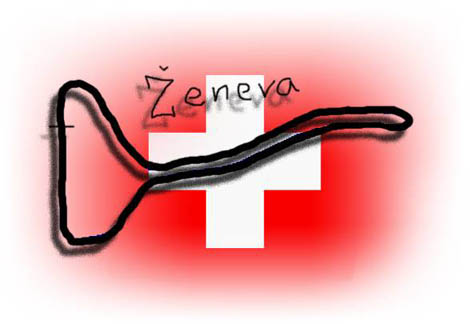
Track layout 1950

The original length of the track for the 1938 event was stated as 2.800 km (1.740 mi). Over the years small changes were made to the track layout until the track was significantly lengthened for the 1950 event by cutting out the hairpin on Avenue de France and replacing it by two long straits on both sides of Route de Lausanne, connected by a 180-degree hairpin.

Key pilots came here to compete, among them Giuseppe Farina, Raymond Sommer, Maurice Trintignant, Juan Manuel Fangio, Prince Bira (who had established residency, in Geneva).

The closest race tracks were Aix-les-Bains – France (Circuit du Lac) and Lausanne (Circuit du Léman or Blécherette). All were temporary urban race tracks that disappeared shortly after the Le Mans accident in 1955, or before.

Date	Race	Race track	Category	Lap length
July 17, 1938	15th Swiss motorcycle Grand Prix	Circuit des Nations	250cc, 350cc, 500cc, sidecar (600cc)	2.800 km (1.740 mi)
July 14, 1946	16th Swiss motorcycle Grand Prix	Circuit des Nations	250cc, 350cc, 500cc, sidecar	2.986 km (1.855 mi)
July 21, 1946	1st Grand Prix des Nations	Circuit des Nations	Grand Prix FIA	2.986 km (1.855 mi)
May 2, 1948	2nd Grand Prix de Genève	Circuit des Nations	Formula 2 FIA, non-championship	2.965 km (1.842 mi)
May 2, 1948	2nd Grand Prix des Nations	Circuit des Nations	Formula 1 FIA, non-championship	2.965 km (1.842 mi)
May 16, 1948	18th Swiss motorcycle Grand Prix	Circuit des Nations	250cc, 350cc, 500cc, sidecar	2.965 km (1.842 mi)
July 23, 1950	20th Swiss motorcycle Grand Prix	Circuit des Nations	250cc, 350cc, 500cc, sidecar	6.325 km (3.930 mi)
July 30, 1950	3rd Grand Prix de Genève	Circuit des Nations	Formula 2 FIA, non-championship	6.325 km (3.930 mi)
July 30, 1950	3rd Grand Prix des Nations	Circuit des Nations	Formula 1 FIA, non-championship	6.325 km (3.930 mi)

== 1st Grand Prix des Nations ==
FIA Grand Prix, Circuit des Nations, Geneva, Switzerland – July 21, 1946

44 laps of the urban race track (short version) of 2.965 km (1.842 mi), or 130 km (81 mi), at an average speed of 103.9 km/h (64.6 mph).

Position	Pilot	Car
1	(Italy) Giuseppe Farina	Alfa Romeo 158
2	(Italy) Carlo Felice Trossi	Alfa Romeo 158
3	(France) Jean-Pierre Wimille	Alfa Romeo 158
4	(Italy) Tazio Nuvolari	Maserati 4CL
5	(Switzerland) Emmanuel de Graffenried	Maserati 4CL
6	(Thailand) Prince Bira	ERA B
7	(Italy) Achille Varzi	Alfa Romeo 158
8	(France) Raymond Sommer	Maserati 4CL
DNF	(United Kingdom) George Abecassis	Alta
DNF	(United Kingdom) Reg Parnell	Maserati 4CL
DNF	(Italy) Luigi Villoresi	Maserati 4CL

== 2nd Grand Prix de Genève ==
FIA Formula 2, non-championship race, Circuit des Nations, Geneva, Switzerland – May 2, 1948

70 laps of the urban race track (short version) 2.945 km (1.830 mi), or 206 km (128 mi), at an average speed of 98.15 km/h (60.99 mph).

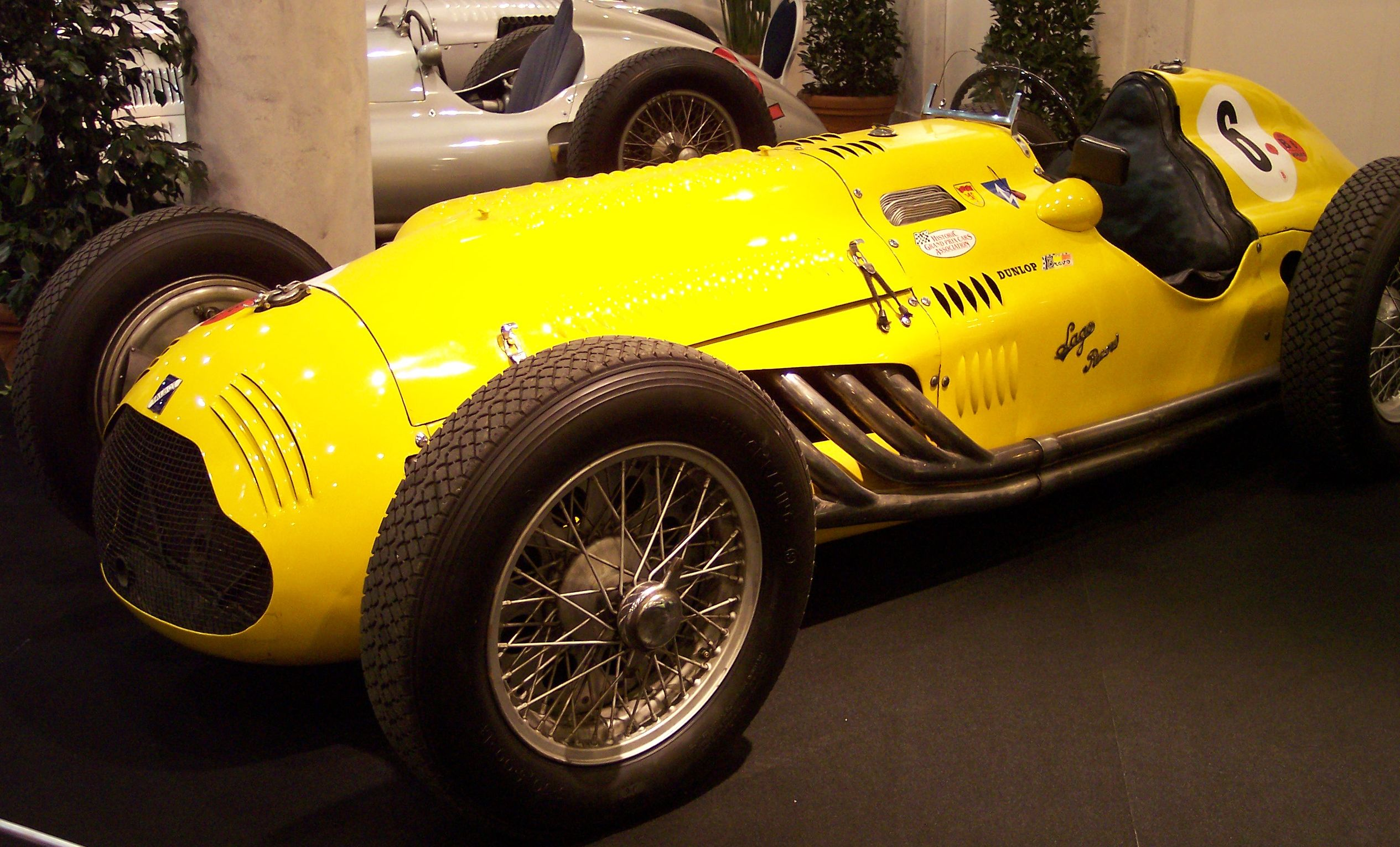
Talbot Lago T26

Position	Pilot	Team	Car
1	(France) Raymond Sommer	Équipe Gordini	Simca-Gordini T11
2	(Thailand) Prince Bira	Équipe Gordini	Simca-Gordini T11
3	(France) Robert Manzon	Équipe Gordini	Simca-Gordini T11
4	(United States) Harry Schell	Écurie Bleue	Cisitalia D46-Fiat
5	(France) "Robert"	Écurie Pano	Cisitalia D46-Fiat
6	(Switzerland) Claude Bernheim	Écurie Autosport	Cisitalia D46-Fiat
DNF	(France) Raymond de Saugé	Raymond de Saugé Destrez	Cisitalia D46-Fiat
DNF	(Italy) Carlo Pesci	Carlo Pesci	Cisitalia D46-Fiat
DNF	(France) Roger Loyer	Écurie de Paris	Cisitalia D46-Fiat
DNF	(France) Maurice Trintignant	Équipe Gordini	Simca-Gordini T11
DNF	(Austria) Hans Stuck	Hans Stuck	Cisitalia D46-Fiat
DNF	(Switzerland) Rudolf Fischer	Écurie Espadon	Simca-Gordini T11
DQ	(Italy) Walter Triverio	Écurie Pano	Cisitalia D46-Fiat

== 2nd Grand Prix des Nations ==
FIA Formula 1, non-championship race, Circuit des Nations, Geneva, Switzerland – May 2, 1948

80 laps of the urban race track (short version) 2,945 m (1.830 mi) or 236 km (147 mi), at an average speed of 98.18 km/h (61.01 mph).

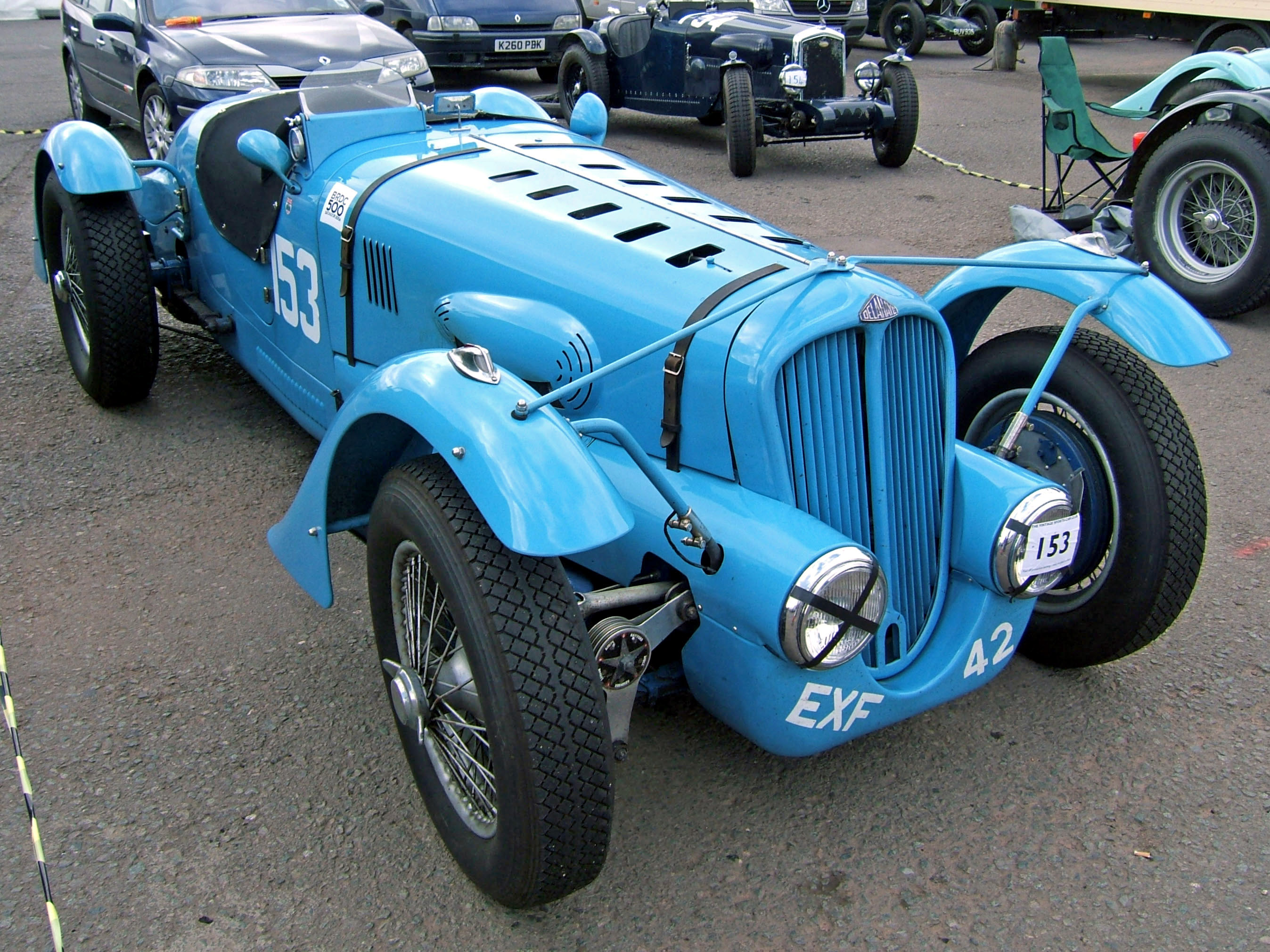
Delahaye 135S

Position	Pilot	Car
1	(Italy) Giuseppe Farina	Maserati 4CLT
2	(Switzerland) Emmanuel de Graffenried	Maserati 4CL
3	(France) Raymond Sommer	Ferrari 166SC
4	(France) Eugène Chaboud	Delahaye 135S
5	(France) Henri Louveau	Delage D6.70
6	(Argentina) Clemar Bucci	Maserati 4CL
DNF	(France) Jean-Pierre Wimille	Simca-Gordini T15
DNF	(France) Charles Pozzi	Talbot-Lago T150C
DNF	(France) Louis Rosier	Talbot-Lago 150SS
DNF	(France) Yves Giraud-Cabantous	Talbot-Lago 150C
DNF	(Italy) Nello Pagani	Maserati 4CL
DNF	(Italy) Luigi Villoresi	Maserati 4CL
DNF	(Italy) Luigi Fagioli	Maserati 4CL
DNF	(France) Maurice Trintignant	Simca-Gordini T15
DNF	(Thailand) Prince Bira	Maserati 4CL
DNF	(Switzerland) Richard Ramseyer	Maserati 4CL
DNF	(Monaco) Louis Chiron	Talbot-Lago T26 SS

== 3rd Grand Prix de Genève ==
FIA Formula 2, non-championship race, Circuit des Nations, Geneva, Switzerland – July 30, 1950

45 laps of the urban race track 6,325 m (3.930 mi) or 253 km (157 mi), at an average speed of 120.93 km/h (75.14 mph).

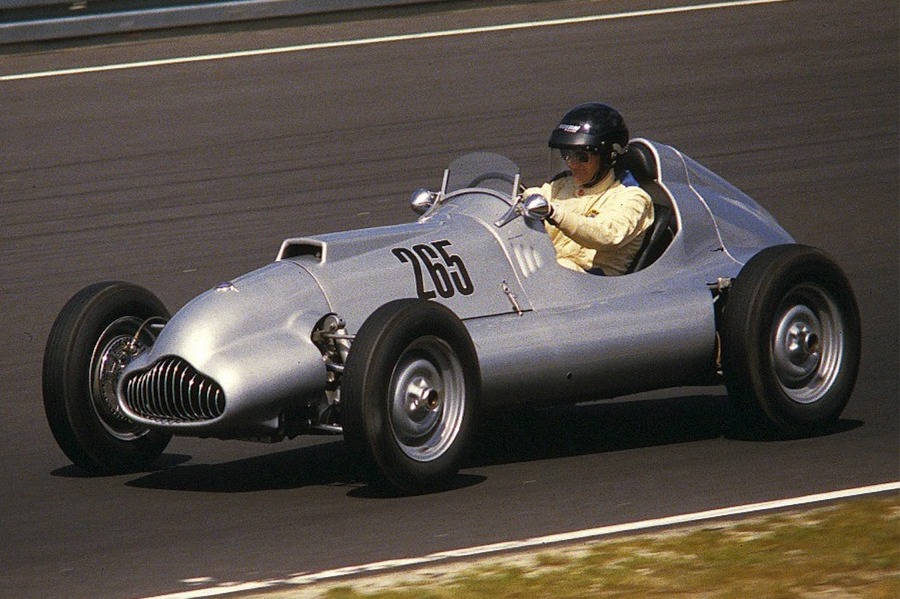
Veritas Meteor

Position	Pilot	Team	Car
1	(France) Maurice Trintignant	Équipe Gordini	Simca-Gordini T15
2	(France) André Simon	Equipe Gordini	Simca-Gordini T15
3	(Italy) Dorino Serafini	Scuderia Ferrari	Ferrari 166F2
4	(Argentina) Roberto Mieres	Automovil Club Argentina	Maserati 4CLT/48
5	(Switzerland) André Canonica	André Canonica	Simca-Gordini T11
6	(United Kingdom) Lance Macklin	HW Motors Ltd.	HWM/Alta
7	(Switzerland) Alfred Dattner	Alfred Dattner	Simca-Gordini T11
8	(Italy) Luigi Villoresi	Scuderia Ferrari	Ferrari 166F2
9	(Switzerland) Toni Branca	Mme. Walckiers	Simca-Gordini T15
10	(France) "Robert"	Écurie Paris	Cisitalia D46/Fiat
DNF	(Italy) Mario Tadini	Scuderia Ferrari	Ferrari 166F2
DNF	(France) Aldo Gordini	Équipe Gordini	Simca-Gordini T15
DNF	(France) Roger Loyer	Écurie Paris	Simca-Gordini T16
DNF	(Switzerland) Paul Glauser	Écurie Suisse	Veritas Meteor
DNF	(United States) Alexander Orley	Alexander Orley	Veritas Meteor
DNF	(United Kingdom) George Abecassis	HW Motors Ltd.	HWM/Alta
DNF	(Argentina) Ernesto Tornqvist	Équipe Gordini	Simca-Gordini T11
DNF	(United States) Harry Schell	Horschell Racing Corporation	Cooper T12/JAP

== 3rd Grand Prix des Nations ==
FIA Formula 1, non-championship race, Circuit des Nations, Geneva, Switzerland – July 30, 1950

68 laps of the urban race track 6.325 km (3.930 mi) or 430 km (270 mi), at an average speed of 127.60 km/h (79.29 mph).

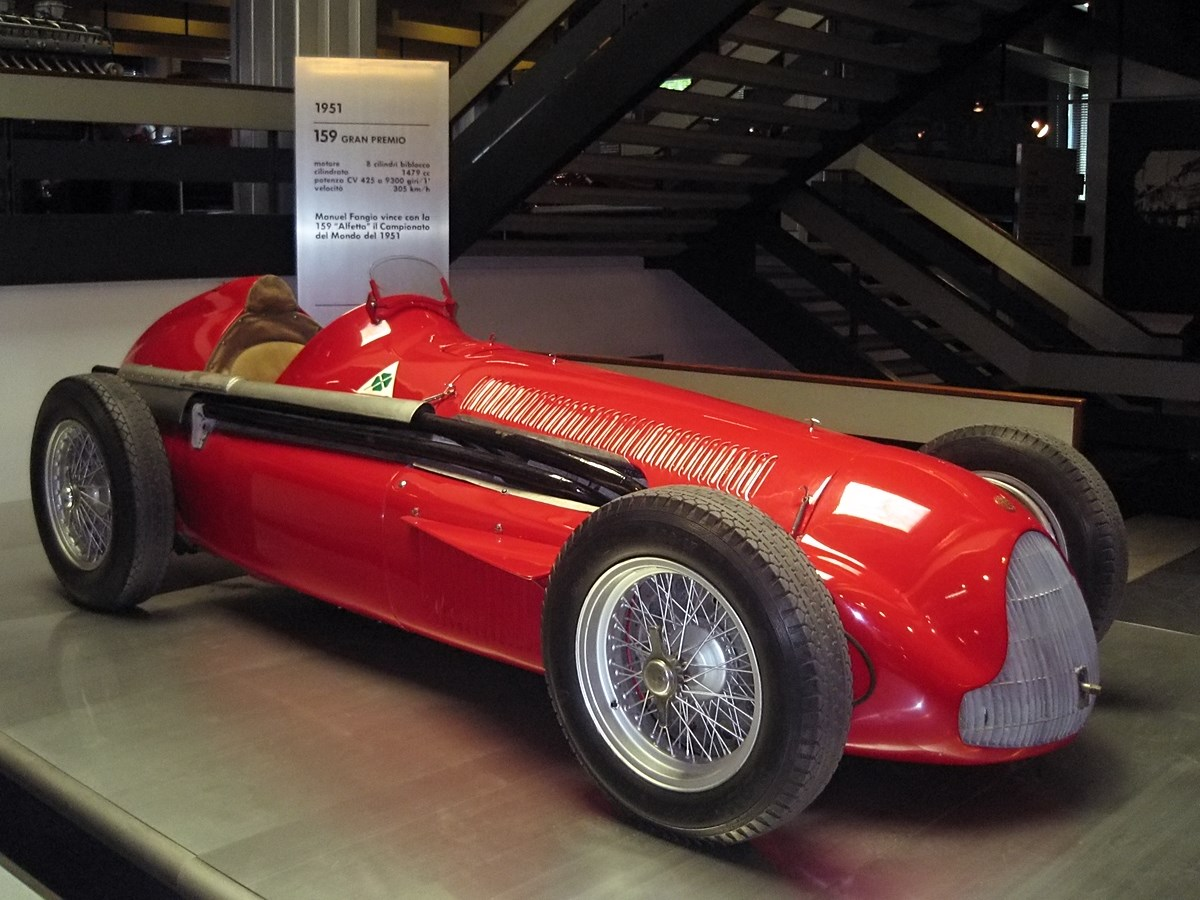
Alfa Romeo 159

Position	Pilot	Car
1	(Argentina) Juan Manuel Fangio	Alfa Romeo 158
2	(Switzerland) Emmanuel de Graffenried	Alfa Romeo 158
3	(Italy) Piero Taruffi	Alfa Romeo 158
4	(Italy) Alberto Ascari	Ferrari 125
5	(France) Yves Giraud-Cabantous	Talbot-Lago T26C
6	(Italy) Giuseppe Farina	Alfa Romeo 158
7	(France) Robert Manzon	Simca-Gordini T15
8	(Monaco) Louis Chiron	Maserati 4CLT-48
9	(Italy) Luigi Villoresi	Ferrari 125
10	(Belgium) Johnny Claes	Talbot-Lago T26C
11	(Italy) Felice Bonetto	Maserati Milano 4CLT-50
12	(Italy) Franco Rol	Maserati 4CLT-48
13	(Switzerland) Toni Branca	Maserati 4CL
DNF	(France) Raymond Sommer	Talbot-Lago T26C
DNF	(United Kingdom) Reg Parnell	Maserati 4CLT-48
DNF	(Thailand) Prince Bira	Maserati 4CLT-48
DNF	(United Kingdom) David Murray	Maserati 4CLT-48
DNF	(Italy) Gianfranco Comotti	Maserati Milano 4CLT-50
DNF	(United States) Harry Schell	Maserati 4CLT-48
DNF	(Argentina) José Froilán González	Maserati 4CLT-48

== Swiss motorcycle Grand Prix winners by year ==
Year	250cc		350cc		500cc		Sidecar		Report
Year	Rider	Manufacturer	Rider	Manufacturer	Rider	Manufacturer	Rider	Manufacturer	Report
1950	(Italy) Dario Ambrosini	Benelli	(United Kingdom) Leslie Graham	AJS	(United Kingdom) Leslie Graham	AJS	(United Kingdom) Eric Oliver/ (Italy) Lorenzo Dobelli	Norton	Report
1948	(Italy) Dario Ambrosini	Benelli	(United Kingdom) Artie Bell	Norton	(United Kingdom) Harold Daniell	Norton	(Switzerland) Hans Haldemann/ (Switzerland) Herbert Läderach	Norton	Report
1946	(Italy) Celeste Cavaciuti	Moto Guzzi	(Switzerland) Walther Hess	Velocette	(Italy) Nello Pagani	Gilera	(Switzerland) Ferdinand Aubert/ (Switzerland) Rudi Grob	Norton	Report
1938	(Germany) Ewald Kluge	DKW	(United Kingdom) Harold Daniell	Norton	(United Kingdom) Harold Daniell	Norton	(United Kingdom) Arthur Horton/ (United Kingdom) Les Seals	Norton	Report

== Cancellation ==
Towards the end of the third Grand Prix des Nations (1950), the engine of Alberto Ascari's Ferrari 340 blew up, pouring oil onto the corner at the end of the Avenue de la Paix. Behind him Luigi Villoresi, in a Ferrari 275, could not avoid the oil, his car skidded, went over the security barrier and ploughed into the crowd. Three spectators were killed; another twenty were injured. Villoresi survived with a severely fractured leg.

After this tragedy, stemming like others from the use of street circuits ill-adapted to increasingly high-speed motor racing, the organisers cancelled the following year's event. Geneva would never again host a Grand Prix race.

In 1958 motor racing was banned altogether by the Swiss government as an unsafe spectator sport following the death of 80 people at the 1955 24 Hours of Le Mans race.
