= Geneva Grand Prix =

Former auto race in Switzerland

- Circuit des Nations (1948–1950)

Race information
- Number of times held: 3
- First held: 1931
- Last held: 1950
- Laps: 45

The Geneva Grand Prix (French: Grand Prix de Genève) was a Grand Prix held three times between 1931 and 1950.

The Circuit de Meyrin first started hosting motor-racing in 1923 featuring cars as well as motorcycles and side cars. Interest eventually waned and in 1931 only a car race was held named as the Geneva Grand Prix. During this event a crash involving driver Stanisław Czaykowski resulted in the death of a bystander in a house adjacent to the circuit, bringing an end to racing at this circuit. Two more editions of the race were held under Formula Two regulations at the Circuit des Nations in 1948 and 1950 alongside the 2nd and 3rd Grand Prix Des Nations non-championship races held to Formula One regulations. Subsequent events at the circuit were cancelled after the 1950 Nations Grand Prix, during the race Luigi Villoresi's car struck some oil on the racing surface causing him to lose control; the car crashed into a wooden fence resulting in the death of 3 spectators and injuring more than 30 others. The Swiss motorsport ban following the 1955 Le Mans disaster has put a definitive end to this event.

== Results ==
Year	Winning Driver	Winning Constructor	Circuit	Report
1931	(France) Marcel Lehoux	(France) Bugatti	Meyrin	Report
1948	(France) Raymond Sommer	(France) Simca-Gordini	Geneva	Report
1950	(France) Maurice Trintignant	(France) Simca-Gordini	Geneva	Report
