= 1948 Nations Grand Prix =

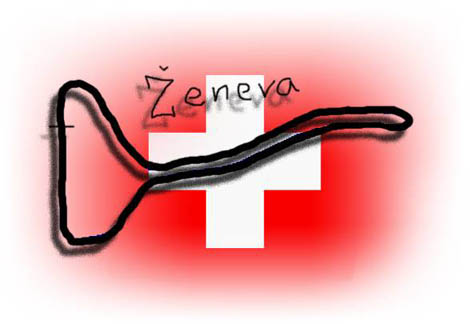

Race details
- Date: 2 May 1948
- Official name: II Grand Prix des Nations
- Location: Geneva, Switzerland
- Course: Temporary street circuit
- Course length: 2.945 kilometres (1.830 miles)
- Distance: 80 laps, 235.60 kilometres (146.40 miles)

Pole position
Driver	(Italy) Giuseppe Farina	Maserati
- Time: unknown

Fastest lap
Driver	(Italy) Giuseppe Farina	Maserati
- Time: 1:44.1

Podium
First	(Italy) Giuseppe Farina	Maserati
Second	(Switzerland) Emmanuel de Graffenried	Maserati
Third	(France) Raymond Sommer	Ferrari

The 2nd Nations Grand Prix was a Formula One motor race held on 2 May 1948 over 80 laps of a street circuit in Geneva, Switzerland. Giuseppe Farina, driving a Maserati 4CLT, started from pole, set fastest lap and won the race. Emmanuel de Graffenried was second in another 4CLT, and Raymond Sommer was third in a Ferrari 166 SC.

== Classification ==
=== Qualifying ===
Pos	No	Driver	Entrant	Car	Time	Grid
1	36	(Italy) Giuseppe Farina	Giuseppe Farina	Maserati 4CLT	2:23:56.2, 98.78kph	1
2	40	(Switzerland) Emmanuel de Graffenried	Enrico Plate	Maserati 4CLT	+1:50.1	2
3	2	(France) Raymond Sommer	Ecurie Inter	Ferrari 166 SC	+1 lap	4
4	26	(France) Eugene Chaboud	Ecurie Lutetia	Delahaye 135S	+2 laps	9
5	46	(France) Henri Louveau	Henri Louveau	Delage D6	+10 laps	12
6	12	(Argentina) Clemar Bucci	Scuderia Milano	Maserati 4CL	+15 laps	14
Ret	28	(France) Charles Pozzi	Ecurie Lutetia	Talbot-Lago T150C	52 laps	13
Ret	22	(France) Jean-Pierre Wimille	Equipe Gordini	Simca Gordini Type 15	51 laps, rocker	8
Ret	34	(France) Louis Rosier	Ecurie Tricolore	Talbot-Lago T150SS	40 laps	6
Ret	8	(France) Yves Giraud-Cabantous	Ecurie France	Talbot-Lago T150C	39 laps, brakes	10
Ret	16	(Italy) Luigi Fagioli	Scuderia Milano	Maserati 4CL	31 laps	16
Ret	18	(Italy) Luigi Villoresi	Scuderia Ambrosiana	Maserati 4CLT	31 laps, engine	15
Ret	10	(Thailand) B. Bira	Enrico Plate	Maserati 4CL	15 laps, valve	5
Ret	14	(Italy) Nello Pagani	Scuderia Milano	Maserati 4CL	15 laps	17
Ret	24	(France) Maurice Trintignant	Equipe Gordini	Simca Gordini Type 15	14 laps	7
Ret	42	(Switzerland) Richard Ramseyer	Richard Ramseyer	Maserati 4CL	10 laps, gasket	11
Ret	6	(Monaco) Louis Chiron	Ecurie France	Talbot-Lago T26SS	2 laps, oil pressure	3

Previous race: 1948 Jersey Road Race	Formula One non-championship races 1948 season	Next race: 1948 British Empire Trophy
Previous race: 1946 Nations Grand Prix	Nations Grand Prix	Next race: 1950 Nations Grand Prix
