= 1946 Nations Grand Prix =

Race details
- Date: 21 July 1946
- Official name: I Grand Prix des Nations
- Location: Geneva, Switzerland
- Course: Street circuit
- Course length: 2.986 km (1.855 miles)
- Distance: 44 laps, 131.391 km (81.643 miles)

Pole position
Driver	(Italy) Giuseppe Farina	Alfa Romeo
- Grid positions set by heat results

Fastest lap
Driver	(France) Jean-Pierre Wimille	Alfa Romeo
- Time: 1:36.4

Podium
First	(Italy) Giuseppe Farina	Alfa Romeo
Second	(Italy) Carlo Felice Trossi	Alfa Romeo
Third	(France) Jean-Pierre Wimille	Alfa Romeo

The 1946 Nations Grand Prix was a Grand Prix motor race held in Geneva on 21 July 1946.

== Classification ==
=== Final ===
Pos	No	Driver	Team	Car	Laps	Time/Retired	Grid
1	42	(Italy) **Giuseppe Farina**	Alfa Corse	Alfa Romeo 158	44	1:15:49.4	1
2	44	(Italy) **Carlo Felice Trossi**	Alfa Corse	Alfa Romeo 158	44	+1:11.5	
3	18	(France) **Jean-Pierre Wimille**	Alfa Corse	Alfa Romeo 158	43	+1 Lap	
4	46	(Italy) **Tazio Nuvolari**	Scuderia Milano	Maserati 4CL	42	+2 Laps	
5	38	(Switzerland) **Toulo de Graffenried**	Ecurie Autosport	Maserati 4CL	42	+2 Laps	
6	2	(Thailand) **Prince Bira**	Private entry	ERA B	42	+2 Laps	
7	20	(Italy) **Achille Varzi**	Alfa Corse	Alfa Romeo 158	38	+6 Laps	
8	22	(France) **Raymond Sommer**	Scuderia Milano	Maserati 4CL	36	+8 Laps	
Ret	26	(United Kingdom) **George Abecassis**	Private entry	Alta	23	Carburettor	
Ret	4	(United Kingdom) **Reg Parnell**	Private entry	Maserati 4CL	1	Accident	
Ret	24	(Italy) **Luigi Villoresi**	Scuderia Milano	Maserati 4CL	1	Accident	

=== Heat 1 ===
Drivers in bold advanced to the final

Pos	No	Driver	Team	Car	Laps	Time/Retired	Grid
1	18	(France) **Jean-Pierre Wimille**	**Alfa Corse**	**Alfa Romeo 158**	32	59:45.5	1
2	20	(Italy) **Achille Varzi**	**Alfa Corse**	**Alfa Romeo 158**	32	+48.0	
3	24	(Italy) **Luigi Villoresi**	**Scuderia Milano**	**Maserati 4CL**	32	+51.0	
4	4	(United Kingdom) **Reg Parnell**	**Private entry**	**Maserati 4CL**	31	+1 Lap	
5	2	(Thailand) **Prince Bira**	**Private entry**	**ERA B**	30	+2 Laps	
6	22	(France) **Raymond Sommer**	**Scuderia Milano**	**Maserati 4CL**	30	+2 Laps	
7	8	(United Kingdom) George Bainbridge	Private entry	ERA B	29	+3 Laps	
8	10	(France) "Raph"	Ecurie Naphtra Course	Maserati 4CL	29	+3 Laps	
Ret	6	(United Kingdom) Peter Whitehead	Private entry	ERA B	28	Engine	
Ret	14	(Switzerland) Josef Vojlectovsky	Private entry	Maserati 6CM	28	Spark plugs	
9	16	(Netherlands) Eric Verkade	Ecurie Autosport	Talbot 700	28	+4 Laps	

- Pole position : Jean-Pierre Wimille, 1:37.5
- Fastest lap : Jean-Pierre Wimille, 1:47.2

=== Heat 2 ===
Drivers in bold advanced to the final

Pos	No	Driver	Team	Car	Laps	Time/Retired	Grid
1	42	(Italy) **Giuseppe Farina**	**Alfa Corse**	**Alfa Romeo 158**	32	56:17.2	1
2	44	(Italy) **Carlo Felice Trossi**	**Alfa Corse**	**Alfa Romeo 158**	32	+33.0	
3	46	(Italy) **Tazio Nuvolari**	**Scuderia Milano**	**Maserati 4CL**	32	+1:11.0	
4	38	(Switzerland) **Toulo de Graffenried**	**Ecurie Autosport**	**Maserati 4CL**	31	+1 Lap	
5	34	(United Kingdom) **Raymond Mays**	**ERA**	**ERA D**	31	+1 Lap	
6	26	(United Kingdom) **George Abecassis**	**Private entry**	**Alta**	31	+1 Lap	
7	36	(United Kingdom) Ian Connell	Private entry	ERA B	30	+2 Laps	
8	52	(United Kingdom) David Hampshire	Private entry	Delage 15S8	30	+2 Laps	
9	28	(United Kingdom) Bob Gerard	Private entry	ERA B	28	+4 Laps	
10	30	(United States) Harry Schell	Écurie Lucy O'Reilly Schell	Maserati 6CM	27	+5 Laps	
Ret	32	(Switzerland) Max Christen	Private entry	Maserati 6CM	25		
Ret	54	(United Kingdom) Leslie Brooke	ERA	ERA B	22	Brakes	

- Pole position : Giuseppe Farina, 1:38.3
- Fastest lap : Giuseppe Farina, 1:42.3

Grand Prix Race
1946 Grand Prix season
Previous race: none	Nations Grand Prix	Next race: 1948 Nations Grand Prix
