= 1950 Nations Grand Prix =

- Non-championship race in the 1950 Formula One season
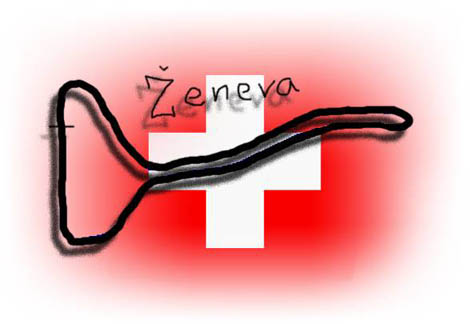

Race details
- Date: 30 July 1950
- Official name: III Grand Prix des Nations
- Location: Geneva, Switzerland
- Course: Permanent racing facility
- Course length: 3.990 km (2.479 miles)
- Distance: 68 laps, 267.247 km (166.059 miles)

Pole position
Driver	(Argentina) Juan Manuel Fangio	Alfa Romeo
- Time: 1:46.7

Fastest lap
Driver	(Italy) Piero Taruffi	Alfa Romeo
- Time: 1:45.1

Podium
First	(Argentina) Juan Manuel Fangio	Alfa Romeo
Second	(Switzerland) Emmanuel de Graffenried	Alfa Romeo
Third	(Italy) Piero Taruffi	Alfa Romeo

The 1950 Nations Grand Prix was a motor race set to Formula One rules, held on 30 July 1950. The race was won by Argentinean driver Juan Manuel Fangio after a distance of 68 laps.

== Classification ==
=== Qualifying ===
Pos	No	Driver	Constructor	Time	Gap
1	4	(Argentina) Juan Manuel Fangio	Alfa Romeo	1:46.7	–
2	40	(Italy) Alberto Ascari	Ferrari	1:48.7	+ 2.0
3	42	(Italy) Luigi Villoresi	Ferrari	1:48.7	+ 2.0
4	2	(Italy) Giuseppe Farina	Alfa Romeo	1:49.3	+ 2.6
5	6	(Switzerland) Emmanuel de Graffenried	Alfa Romeo	1:51.1	+ 4.7
6	44	(France) Raymond Sommer	Talbot-Lago-Talbot	1:52.8	+ 6.1
7	46	(Italy) Piero Taruffi	Alfa Romeo	1:53.0	+ 6.3
8	20	(Italy) Felice Bonetto	Maserati-Milano	1:55.5	+ 8.8
9	10	(Monaco) Louis Chiron	Maserati	1:58.5	+ 11.8
10	24	(France) Robert Manzon	Simca-Gordini	1:58.6	+ 11.9
11	18	(Belgium) Johnny Claes	Talbot-Lago	1:57.9	+ 11.2
12	32	(United States) Harry Schell	Maserati	1:58.7	+ 12.0
13	34	(United Kingdom) Reg Parnell	Maserati	2:00.0	+ 13.3
14	30	(Thailand) Prince Bira	Maserati	2:00.1	+ 13.4
15	16	(France) Yves Giraud-Cabantous	Talbot-Lago	2:01.7	+ 15.0
16	8	(Argentina) José Froilán González	Maserati	2:07.6	+ 20.9
17	26	(Switzerland) Antonio Branca	Maserati	2:07.7	+ 21.0
18	22	(Italy) Franco Comotti	Maserati-Milano	2:17.1	+ 30.4
19	12	(Italy) Franco Rol	Maserati	-	-
20	36	(United Kingdom) David Murray	Maserati	2:26.7	+ 40

=== Race ===
Pos	No	Driver	Constructor	Laps	Time/Retired	Grid
1	4	(Argentina) Juan Manuel Fangio	Alfa Romeo	68	2:07'55.0	1
2	6	(Switzerland) Emmanuel de Graffenried	Alfa Romeo	66	+2 Laps	5
3	46	(Italy) Piero Taruffi	Alfa Romeo	66	+2 Laps	7
4	40	(Italy) Alberto Ascari	Ferrari	62	Engine	2
5	16	(France) Yves Giraud-Cabantous	Talbot-Lago	62	+6 Laps	15
6	2	(Italy) Giuseppe Farina	Alfa Romeo	61	Crashed	4
7	24	(France) Robert Manzon	Simca-Gordini	61	+7 Laps	10
8	10	(Monaco) Louis Chiron	Maserati	61	+7 Laps	9
9	42	(Italy) Luigi Villoresi	Ferrari	60	Accident	3
10	18	(Belgium) Johnny Claes	Talbot-Lago	60	Overheating	11
11	20	(Italy) Felice Bonetto	Maserati-Milano	58	+10 Laps	8
12	12	(Italy) Franco Rol	Maserati	58	+10 Laps	19
13	26	(Switzerland) Antonio Branca	Maserati	56	+12 Laps	17
Ret	44	(France) Raymond Sommer	Talbot-Lago	39	Spun off	6
Ret	34	(United Kingdom) Reg Parnell	Maserati	29	Gave Up	13
Ret	30	(Thailand) Prince Bira	Maserati	24	Exhaust	14
Ret	36	(United Kingdom) David Murray	Maserati	15	Fuel Pump	20
Ret	22	(Italy) Franco Comotti	Maserati-Milano	14	Carburettor	18
Ret	32	(United States) Harry Schell	Maserati	12	Fuel Tank	12
Ret	8	(Argentina) José Froilán González	Maserati	5	Radiator	16

Previous race: 1950 Dutch Grand Prix	Formula One non-championship races 1950 season	Next race: 1950 Nottingham Trophy
Previous race: 1948 Nations Grand Prix	Nations Grand Prix	Next race: None
