= 1950 Chilean Grand Prix =

- Non-championship race in the 1950 Formula One season

Race details
- Date: December 17, 1950
- Official name: Gran Premio del Presidente Arturo Alessandri Palma
- Location: Circuito Pedro de Valdivia Norte, Santiago, Chile
- Course: Permanent racing facility
- Course length: 2.250 km ( miles)

Pole position
Driver	(Argentina) Juan Manuel Fangio	Ferrari
- Time: 1'01.2"

Fastest lap
Driver	(Argentina) Juan Manuel Fangio	Ferrari
- Time: 1'01.2"

Podium
First	(Argentina) Juan Manuel Fangio	Ferrari
Second	(Argentina) Froilán González	Ferrari
Third	(Uruguay) Eitel Cantoni	Maserati

The 1950 Chilean Grand Prix was a Formula Libre motor race held at Santiago on December 17, 1950. The race was won by Juan Manuel Fangio in a Ferrari 166FL. After a crash involving José Félix López a spectator was killed and seven other spectators were injured.

== Race ==
Pos	No	Driver	Constructor	Laps	Time/Retired	Grid
1	4	(Argentina) Juan Manuel Fangio	Ferrari	60	1.14’58.2”	1
2	2	(Argentina) Froilán González	Ferrari	60	1.14’58.8”	3
3	10	(Uruguay) Eitel Cantoni	Maserati	58	+ 2 Laps	-
4	20	(Chile) Bartolomé Ortiz	Simca-Gordini	-	+ 4 Laps	-
5	12	(Argentina) Pascual Puopolo	Maserati	-	+ 5 Laps	4
6		(Argentina) Onofre Marimón	Maserati	-	+ 5 Laps	-
Ret		(Argentina) José Félix López	Chevrolet		Accident	-
Ret		(Argentina) Alberto Crespo	Plymouth	44	Differential	-
Ret		(Chile) Ismael López	Simca-Gordini			-
Ret		(Chile) Ismael González	Maserati			-
Ret		(Argentina) Carlos Menditeguy	Maserati			-
Ret	8	(Argentina) Alfredo Pian	Maserati			2
Ret		(Bolivia) Leon Suarez	Maserati			-
Ret	14	(France) Louis Rosier	Maserati	6		5
