= 1950 Formula One season =

4th season of FIA's Formula One motor racing

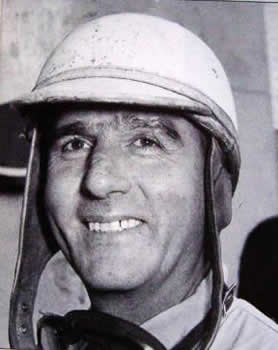
Giuseppe "Nino" Farina was the first Formula One World Champion.

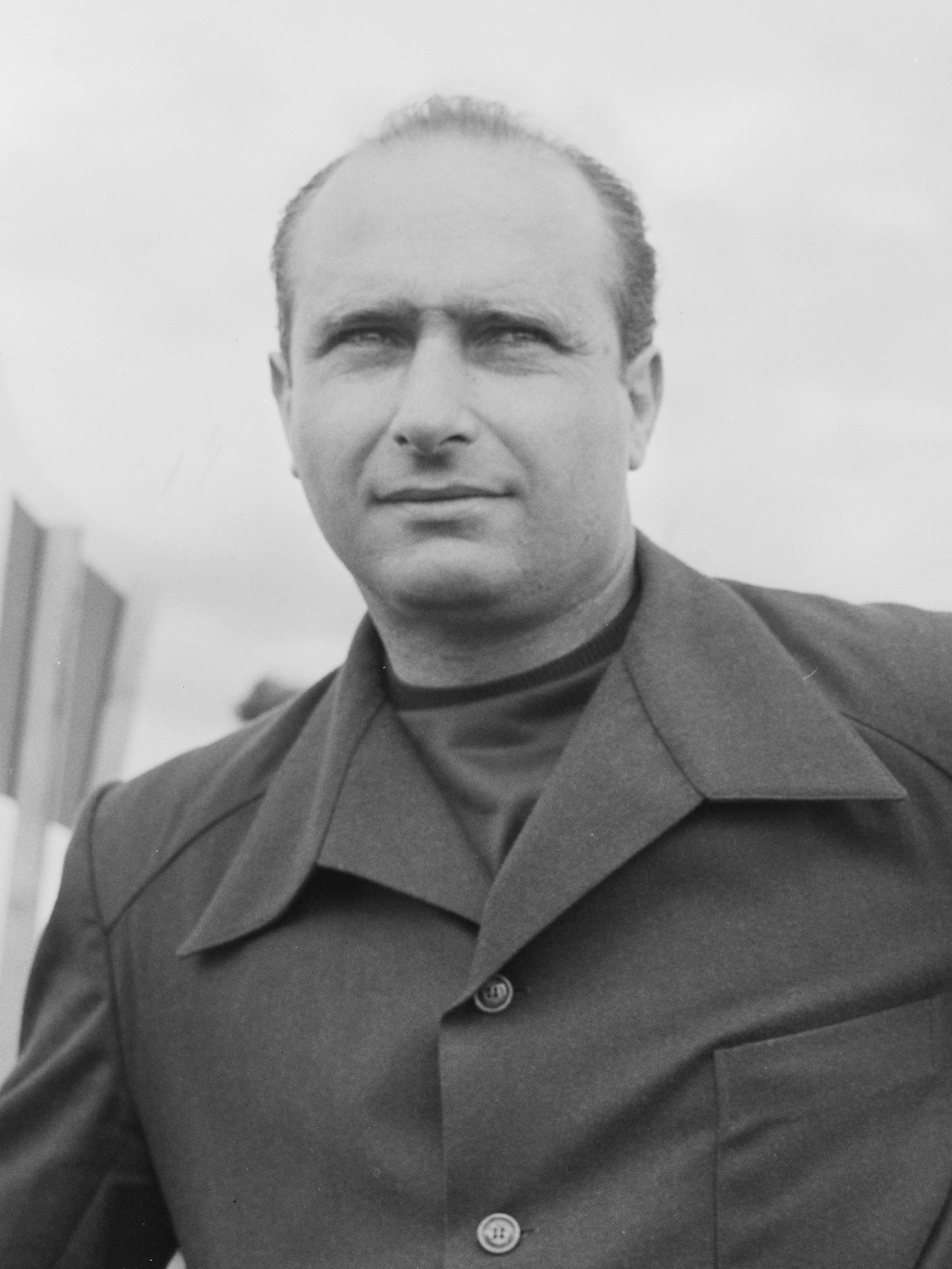
Farina's teammate Juan Manuel Fangio finished runner-up in the World Championship of Drivers.

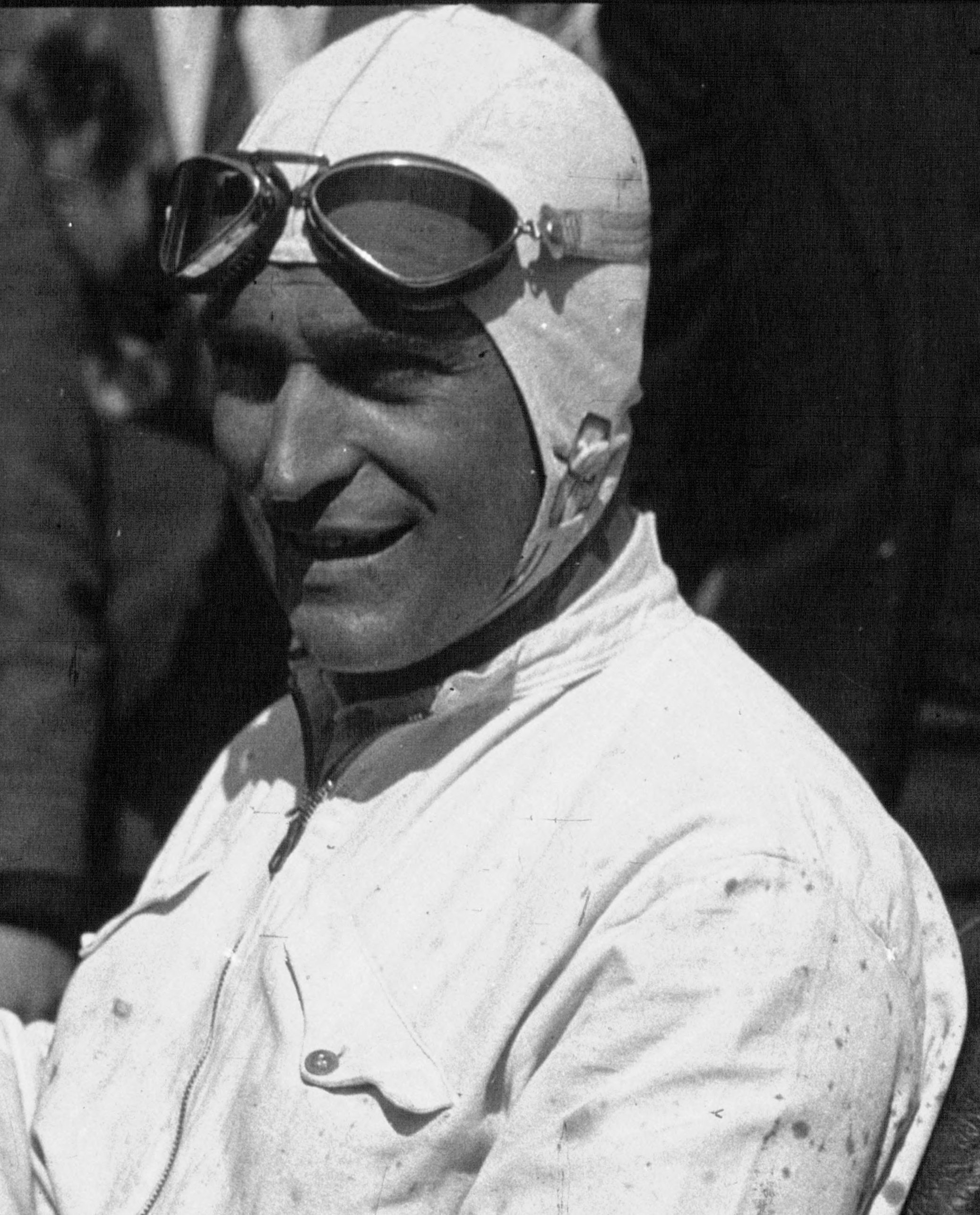
Luigi Fagioli finished in third place in the World Championship of Drivers.

The 1950 Formula One season was the fourth season of the FIA Formula One motor racing. It featured the inaugural FIA World Championship of Drivers, which was contested over seven races between 13 May and 3 September 1950. The only one outside of Europe was the Indianapolis 500, which was run to AAA National Championship regulations. No Formula One drivers competed in the Indy 500 or vice versa. (Note: Three European cars, two Maseratis and one Alfa Romeo, were entered in the Indianapolis 500, including one for Giuseppe Farina, however due to shipping issues none of them reached Indianapolis.) Finally, the season also included several non-championship races for Formula One cars.

Alfa Romeo entered a supercharged 158, a well-developed pre-war design that debuted in 1938, and managed to win all six races they competed in. Italian Giuseppe "Nino" Farina and Argentine teammate Juan Manuel Fangio both won three races and set three fastest laps each. But Fangio did not score points in the other three races, while Farina finished fourth in Belgium, handing him the championship.

== Teams and drivers ==
The following teams and drivers competed in the 1950 FIA World Championship of Drivers. The cars were entered by 30 teams; 4 works teams (Alfa Romeo, Ferrari, Maserati, and Talbot-Lago) and 26 privateer teams. The list does not include those that only contested the Indianapolis 500.

Entrant	Constructor	Chassis	Engine	Tyre	Driver	Rounds
Alfa Romeo SpA	Alfa Romeo	158; 159	Alfa Romeo 158 1.5 L8 s	P	(Argentina) Juan Manuel Fangio	1–2, 4–7
Alfa Romeo SpA	Alfa Romeo	158; 159	Alfa Romeo 158 1.5 L8 s	P	Giuseppe Farina	1–2, 4–7
Alfa Romeo SpA	Alfa Romeo	158; 159	Alfa Romeo 158 1.5 L8 s	P	Luigi Fagioli	1–2, 4–7
Alfa Romeo SpA	Alfa Romeo	158; 159	Alfa Romeo 158 1.5 L8 s	P	(United Kingdom) Reg Parnell	1
Alfa Romeo SpA	Alfa Romeo	158; 159	Alfa Romeo 158 1.5 L8 s	P	Battista Guidotti	1^{9}
Alfa Romeo SpA	Alfa Romeo	158; 159	Alfa Romeo 158 1.5 L8 s	P	Consalvo Sanesi	7
Alfa Romeo SpA	Alfa Romeo	158; 159	Alfa Romeo 158 1.5 L8 s	P	Piero Taruffi	7
Scuderia Ambrosiana	Maserati	4CLT/48	Maserati 4CLT 1.5 L4 s	D	(United Kingdom) David Murray	1, 6^{9}-7
Scuderia Ambrosiana	Maserati	4CLT/48	Maserati 4CLT 1.5 L4 s	D	(United Kingdom) David Hampshire	1, 6
Scuderia Ambrosiana	Maserati	4CLT/48	Maserati 4CLT 1.5 L4 s	D	(United Kingdom) Reg Parnell ^{5} ^{8}	4, 6-7
(United Kingdom) T.A.S.O. Mathieson	ERA	E	ERA 1.5 L6 s	D	(United Kingdom) Leslie Johnson	1
(United Kingdom) Peter Walker	ERA	E	ERA 1.5 L6 s	D	(United Kingdom) Peter Walker	1
(United Kingdom) Peter Walker	ERA	E	ERA 1.5 L6 s	D	(United Kingdom) Tony Rolt	1
(United Kingdom) Raymond Mays	ERA	D	ERA 1.5 L6 s	D	(United Kingdom) Raymond Mays^{1}	1
(United Kingdom) Joe Fry	Maserati	4CL	Maserati 4CL 1.5 L4 s	D	(United Kingdom) Joe Fry	1
(United Kingdom) Joe Fry	Maserati	4CL	Maserati 4CL 1.5 L4 s	D	(United Kingdom) Brian Shawe-Taylor	1
(United Kingdom) Duncan Hamilton	Maserati	4CL	Maserati 4CL 1.5 L4 s	D	(United Kingdom) Duncan Hamilton^{2}	1
(United Kingdom) Cuth Harrison	ERA	B	ERA 1.5 L6 s	D	(United Kingdom) Cuth Harrison	1–2, 7
(United Kingdom) Bob Gerard	ERA	B A	ERA 1.5 L6 s	D	(United Kingdom) Bob Gerard	1–2
(France) Automobiles Talbot-Darracq	Talbot-Lago	T26C-DA; T26C; T26C-GS	Talbot 23CV 4.5 L6	D	(France) Yves Giraud-Cabantous^{3}	1-2, 4–6
(France) Automobiles Talbot-Darracq	Talbot-Lago	T26C-DA; T26C; T26C-GS	Talbot 23CV 4.5 L6	D	(France) Louis Rosier	4–6
(France) Automobiles Talbot-Darracq	Talbot-Lago	T26C-DA; T26C; T26C-GS	Talbot 23CV 4.5 L6	D	(France) Philippe Étancelin	1, 5
(France) Automobiles Talbot-Darracq	Talbot-Lago	T26C-DA; T26C; T26C-GS	Talbot 23CV 4.5 L6	D	(France) Eugène Martin	1, 4
(France) Automobiles Talbot-Darracq	Talbot-Lago	T26C-DA; T26C; T26C-GS	Talbot 23CV 4.5 L6	D	(France) Raymond Sommer	6
(Belgium) Ecurie Belge	Talbot-Lago	T26C	Talbot 23CV 4.5 L6	D	(Belgium) Johnny Claes	1–2, 4–7
Officine Alfieri Maserati	Maserati	4CLT/48	Maserati 4CLT 1.5 L4 s	P	(Monaco) Louis Chiron	1–2, 4, 6–7
Officine Alfieri Maserati	Maserati	4CLT/48	Maserati 4CLT 1.5 L4 s	P	Franco Rol ^{5}	2, 4, 6–7
Scuderia Milano	Maserati-Speluzzi	4CLT/50	Speluzzi 1.5 L4 s	P	Felice Bonetto^{2}	1, 4, 6
Scuderia Milano	Maserati-Speluzzi	4CLT/50	Speluzzi 1.5 L4 s	P	Clemente Biondetti^{3}	2
Scuderia Milano	Maserati-Speluzzi	4CLT/50	Speluzzi 1.5 L4 s	P	Franco Comotti	7
Scuderia Milano	Milano-Speluzzi	1	Speluzzi 1.5 L4 s	P	Felice Bonetto	7
(Switzerland) Enrico Platé	Maserati	4CLT/48	Maserati 4CLT 1.5 L4 s	P	(Switzerland) Toulo de Graffenried	1–2, 4, 7
(Switzerland) Enrico Platé	Maserati	4CLT/48	Maserati 4CLT 1.5 L4 s	P	Birabongse Bhanudej	1–2, 4, 7
(Switzerland) Enrico Platé	Talbot-Lago	Talbot-Lago 700	Talbot 700 1.5 L8s	D	(Italy) Luigi Platé^{8}	7
(Switzerland) Enrico Platé	Talbot-Lago	Talbot-Lago 700	Talbot 700 1.5 L8s	D	(Italy) Franco Bordoni^{8}	7
(Republic of Ireland) Joe Kelly	Alta	GP	Alta 1.5 L4 s	D	(Republic of Ireland) Joe Kelly	1
(United Kingdom) Geoffrey Crossley	Alta	GP	Alta 1.5 L4 s	D	(United Kingdom) Geoffrey Crossley	1, 5
(Argentina) Scuderia Achille Varzi	Maserati	4CLT/48; 4CL	Maserati 4CLT 1.5 L4 s Maserati 4CL 1.5 L4 s	P	(Argentina) José Froilán González	2, 6
(Argentina) Scuderia Achille Varzi	Maserati	4CLT/48; 4CL	Maserati 4CLT 1.5 L4 s Maserati 4CL 1.5 L4 s	P	(Argentina) Alfredo Pián	2
(Argentina) Scuderia Achille Varzi	Maserati	4CLT/48; 4CL	Maserati 4CLT 1.5 L4 s Maserati 4CL 1.5 L4 s	P	Nello Pagani	4
(Argentina) Scuderia Achille Varzi	Maserati	4CLT/48; 4CL	Maserati 4CLT 1.5 L4 s Maserati 4CL 1.5 L4 s	P	(Switzerland) Toni Branca	4
(Argentina) Scuderia Achille Varzi	Maserati	4CLT/48; 4CL	Maserati 4CLT 1.5 L4 s Maserati 4CL 1.5 L4 s	P	Franco Comotti ^{6}	6
(United States) Horschell Racing Corporation	Cooper-JAP	T12	JAP 1.1 V2	D	(United States) Harry Schell	2
(France) Equipe Gordini	Simca-Gordini	T15	Simca-Gordini 15C 1.5 L4 s	E	(France) Robert Manzon	2, 6–7
(France) Equipe Gordini	Simca-Gordini	T15	Simca-Gordini 15C 1.5 L4 s	E	(France) Maurice Trintignant	2, 7
(France) Equipe Gordini	Simca-Gordini	T15	Simca-Gordini 15C 1.5 L4 s	E	(France) André Simon^{4}	2
(France) Philippe Étancelin	Talbot-Lago	T26C; T26C-DA	Talbot 23CV 4.5 L6	D	(France) Philippe Étancelin	2, 4, 6-7
(France) Philippe Étancelin	Talbot-Lago	T26C; T26C-DA	Talbot 23CV 4.5 L6	D	(France) Eugène Chaboud	6
(France) Ecurie Rosier	Talbot-Lago	T26C; T26C-GS	Talbot 23CV 4.5 L6	D	(France) Louis Rosier	1-2, 7
(France) Ecurie Rosier	Talbot-Lago	T26C; T26C-GS	Talbot 23CV 4.5 L6	D	(France) Charles Pozzi^{3}	2
(France) Ecurie Rosier	Talbot-Lago	T26C; T26C-GS	Talbot 23CV 4.5 L6	D	(France) Henri Louveau	7
(France) Pierre Levegh	Talbot-Lago	T26C	Talbot 23CV 4.5 L6	D	(France) Pierre Levegh^{3}	2, 5–7
(United Kingdom) Peter Whitehead	Ferrari	125	Ferrari 125 F1 1.5 V12 s	D P	(United Kingdom) Peter Whitehead^{5}	2, 4, 6–7
Scuderia Ferrari	Ferrari	125; 166F2-50; 275; 375	Ferrari 125 F1 1.5 V12 s Ferrari 166 F2 2.0 V12; Ferrari 275 F1 3.3 V12; Ferrari 375 F1 4.5 V12	P	Luigi Villoresi	2, 4–6
Scuderia Ferrari	Ferrari	125; 166F2-50; 275; 375	Ferrari 125 F1 1.5 V12 s Ferrari 166 F2 2.0 V12; Ferrari 275 F1 3.3 V12; Ferrari 375 F1 4.5 V12	P	Alberto Ascari	2, 4–7
Scuderia Ferrari	Ferrari	125; 166F2-50; 275; 375	Ferrari 125 F1 1.5 V12 s Ferrari 166 F2 2.0 V12; Ferrari 275 F1 3.3 V12; Ferrari 375 F1 4.5 V12	P	(France) Raymond Sommer	2, 4
Scuderia Ferrari	Ferrari	125; 166F2-50; 275; 375	Ferrari 125 F1 1.5 V12 s Ferrari 166 F2 2.0 V12; Ferrari 275 F1 3.3 V12; Ferrari 375 F1 4.5 V12	P	(Italy) Giovanni Bracco^{8}	7
Scuderia Ferrari	Ferrari	125; 166F2-50; 275; 375	Ferrari 125 F1 1.5 V12 s Ferrari 166 F2 2.0 V12; Ferrari 275 F1 3.3 V12; Ferrari 375 F1 4.5 V12	P	Dorino Serafini	7
(United States) Ecurie Bleue	Talbot-Lago	T26C	Talbot 23CV 4.5 L6	D	(United States) Harry Schell	4
(Switzerland) Ecurie Espadon	SVA-Fiat	SVA 1500	Fiat L4s	P	(Switzerland) Rudi Fischer^{5}	4
(France) Raymond Sommer	Talbot-Lago	T26C	Talbot 23CV 4.5 L6	D	(France) Raymond Sommer	5, 7
(France) Ecurie Lutetia	Talbot-Lago	T26C-DA	Talbot 23CV 4.5 L6	D	(France) Eugène Chaboud^{7}	5–6
(Switzerland) Antonio Branca	Maserati	4CL	Maserati 4CL 1.5 L4 s	P	(Switzerland) Toni Branca	5
(France) Charles Pozzi	Talbot-Lago	T26C	Talbot 23CV 4.5 L6	D	(France) Charles Pozzi	6
(France) Charles Pozzi	Talbot-Lago	T26C	Talbot 23CV 4.5 L6	D	(France) Louis Rosier	6
Clemente Biondetti	Ferrari-Jaguar	Biondetti/166 SC	Jaguar XK 3.4 L6	P	Clemente Biondetti	7
(West Germany) Paul Pietsch	Maserati	4CLT/48	Maserati 4CLT 1.5 L4 s	P	(West Germany) Paul Pietsch	7
(Italy) Luigi de Filippis	Maserati	4CLT/48	Maserati 4CLT 1.5 L4 s	P	(Italy) Luigi de Filippis^{8}	7
(France) Guy Mairesse	Talbot-Lago	T26C	Talbot 23CV 4.5 L6	D	(France) Guy Mairesse	7

^1 – Entry cancelled prior to the event.
^2 – Did not attend on British Grand Prix
^3 – Did not attend on Monaco Grand Prix
^4 – Entry withdrawn prior to event.
^5 – Did not attend on Swiss Grand Prix
^6 – Did not attend on French Grand Prix
^7 – Chaboud originally entered his own Talbot for the French Grand Prix but did not start the race, and instead co-drove with Philippe Étancelin.
^8 – Did not attend on Italian Grand Prix
^9 – Substitute driver wasn't used at the Grand Prix.

== Calendar ==
Round	Grand Prix	Circuit	Date
1	British Grand Prix	(United Kingdom) Silverstone Circuit, Silverstone	13 May
2	Monaco Grand Prix	Circuit de Monaco, Monte Carlo	21 May
3	Indianapolis 500	(United States) Indianapolis Motor Speedway, Speedway	30 May (Note: The Indianapolis 500 also counted towards the 1950 AAA Championship Car season, and was run for AAA Championship cars.)
4	Swiss Grand Prix	(Switzerland) Circuit Bremgarten, Bern	4 June
5	Belgian Grand Prix	(Belgium) Circuit de Spa-Francorchamps, Stavelot	18 June
6	French Grand Prix	(France) Reims-Gueux, Gueux	2 July
7	Italian Grand Prix	Autodromo Nazionale di Monza, Monza	3 September

== Championship summary ==
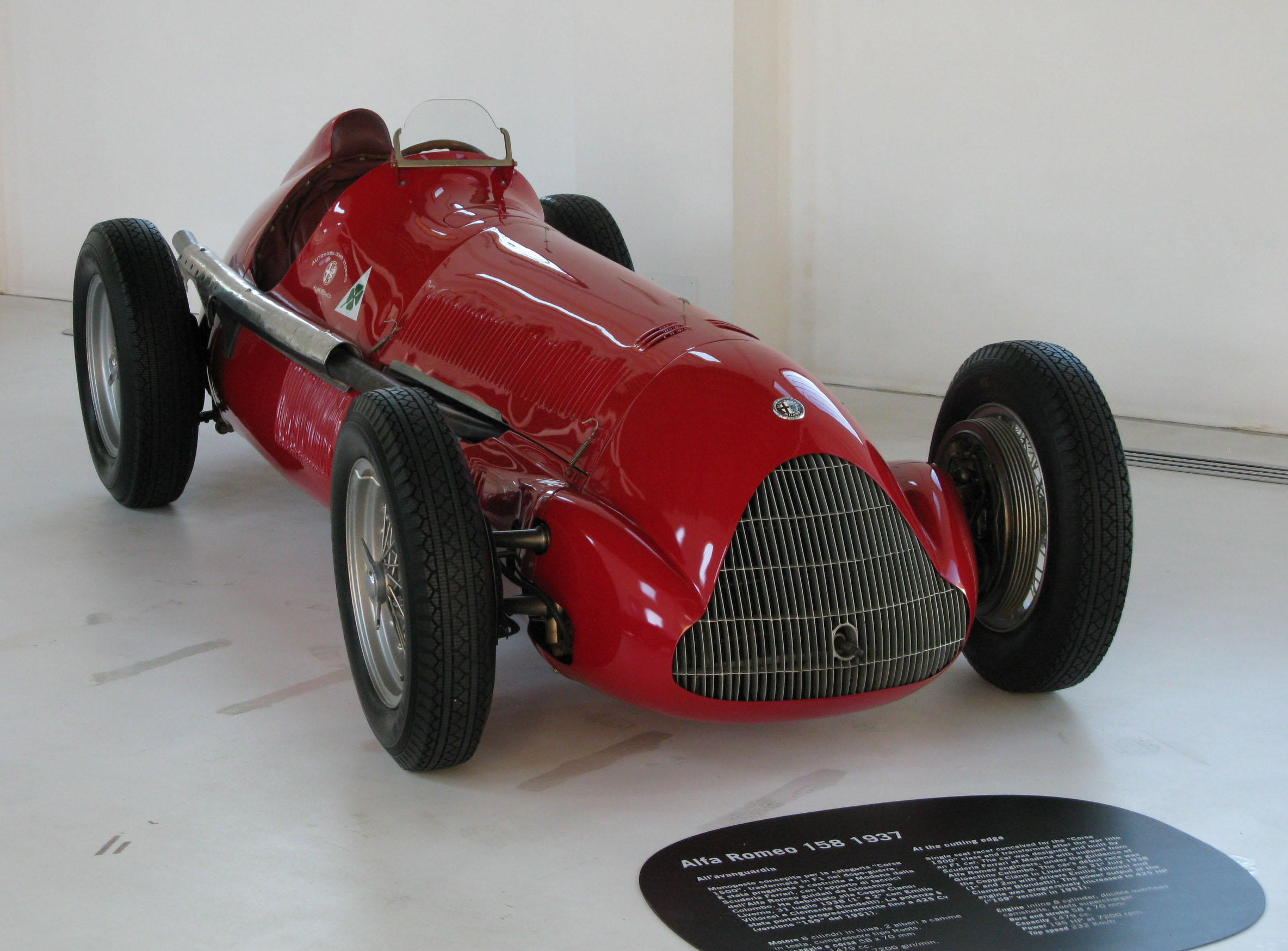
Alfa Romeo won six of the seven championship races with its 158

=== Round 1: Britain ===
The Alfa Romeo team dominated the British Grand Prix at the fast Silverstone circuit in England, locking out the four-car front row of the grid. With King George VI in attendance, Giuseppe Farina won the race from pole position, also setting the fastest lap. The podium was completed by his teammates Luigi Fagioli and Reg Parnell, while the remaining Alfa driver, Juan Manuel Fangio, was forced to retire after experiencing problems with his engine. The final points scorers were the works Talbot-Lagos of Yves Giraud-Cabantous and Louis Rosier, both two laps behind the leaders.

=== Round 2: Monaco ===
Scuderia Ferrari made their World Championship debut around the streets of Monaco. Their leading drivers, Luigi Villoresi and Alberto Ascari had to settle for the third row of the grid, however, while the Alfa Romeos of Fangio and Farina again started from the front row, alongside the privateer Maserati of José Froilán González. Polesitter Fangio took a comfortable victory, setting the race's fastest lap, a whole lap ahead of Ascari, with the third-placed Louis Chiron a further lap back in the works Maserati. A first-lap accident caused by the damp track had eliminated nine of the nineteen starters—including Farina and Fagioli—while González, who had incurred damage in the pile-up, retired on the following lap. Villoresi, although delayed by the accident, had made his way through the field to second place but was forced to retire with an axle problem. Fangio's win brought him level with Farina in the points standings.

=== Round 3: Indianapolis 500 ===
The Indianapolis 500, the third round of the inaugural World Championship of Drivers held at the Indianapolis Motor Speedway in Indianapolis, Indiana, in the United States, was won by the Kurtis Kraft-Offenhauser of Johnnie Parsons, ahead of the Diedt-Offenhausers of Bill Holland and Mauri Rose. The race was stopped after 138 of the scheduled 200 laps due to rain.

=== Round 4: Switzerland ===
Alfa Romeo's dominance continued when the World Championship returned to Europe for the Swiss Grand Prix at the tree-lined Bremgarten circuit outside Bern. Fangio, Farina, and Fagioli locked out the front row of the grid for Alfa, while the Ferraris of Villoresi and Ascari started from the second row. Fangio was the initial leader, starting from pole position, but Farina passed him on lap seven. Ascari and Villoresi were both able to compete with the third Alfa of Fagioli in the early stages, although both had retired by the ten-lap mark. Farina took the win and the fastest lap, finishing just ahead of Fagioli, while Rosier, in third place due to Fangio's retirement, took Talbot-Lago's first podium. Farina's second win of the season put him six points clear of the consistent Fagioli, while Fangio was a further three points behind, having only scored points in one race (in Monaco, where he won).

=== Round 5: Belgium ===
Alfa Romeo took their third front row lockout of the season at the Belgian Grand Prix at the speedy 8.7 miles (14.0 km) Spa-Francorchamps circuit, while the Ferrari of Villoresi shared the second row with the privateer Talbot-Lago of Raymond Sommer. The Alfas were once again untouchable at the start of the race, but when they stopped for fuel, Sommer emerged as an unlikely race leader. His lead, however, was short-lived, and he was forced to retire when his engine blew up. Fangio ultimately took the victory, ahead of Fagioli, who again finished second. Rosier again made the podium in his Talbot-Lago. He had been able to pass the polesitter Farina when the Italian picked up transmission problems towards the end of the race. It was not all bad for Farina, however, as he picked up the point for fastest lap. Fagioli and Fangio closed the gap to Farina in the points standings—Fagioli was just four points adrift, while Fangio was a further point behind.

=== Round 6: France ===
Alfa Romeo was largely unchallenged at the French Grand Prix, held at the high-speed Reims-Gueux circuit, due to the withdrawal of the works Ferraris of Ascari and Villoresi. The Alfas produced yet another lockout of the front row of the grid, with Fangio taking pole for the third time in six races. The power of the Alfas suited this public road circuit- made up entirely of long straights, and Farina, starting from second, led for the first quarter of the race before fuel problems put him to the back of the field. He fought back to third before he was forced to retire (he was ultimately classified seventh). Fangio picked up the fastest lap on his way to his second consecutive victory. Fagioli finished second for the fourth time out of five starts, while Peter Whitehead, in a privateer Ferrari, took a maiden podium in his first start of the season. Fangio took the championship lead as a result of his victory. Fagioli remained in second, while Farina dropped to third, four points behind his Argentinian teammate.

=== Round 7: Italy ===
The final championship round of the season was the Italian Grand Prix at the Monza Autodrome near Milan, and all three of the regular Alfa Romeo drivers were in contention for the title. If Fangio finished first or second, he would win the title, regardless of where his teammates finished. If Farina failed to score at least five points, he would be unable to take the title. Fagioli's only chance of becoming World Champion was if he won the race and set the fastest lap; even then, he would need Farina to finish no higher than third, and Fangio would have to score no points at all.

Fangio again took pole position, but Alfa Romeo could not make it a fifth front-row lockout of the season, as Ascari qualified second for Ferrari. Farina started from third, while Consalvo Sanesi completed the front row in an additional Alfa Romeo. Fagioli could only manage fifth on the grid, alongside the fifth Alfa of Piero Taruffi, the second Ferrari of Dorino Serafini, and Sommer in a Talbot-Lago. Farina took the lead early on, with Ascari and Fangio not far behind. Ascari briefly held the lead but was forced to retire when his engine overheated. Two laps later, Fangio also retired due to problems with his gearbox. Taruffi's car, which was now running in second, was taken over by Fangio, although the Argentinian was forced to retire for the second time in the race, this time with engine problems. Ascari took over Serafini's car and ultimately finished second behind Farina, whose victory clinched the title by taking him three points clear of Fangio. Fagioli finished third in the race, and clinched the same position in the Drivers' Championship standings.

== Results and standings ==
=== Grands Prix ===
Round	Grand Prix	Pole position	Fastest lap	Winning driver	Winning constructor	Tyre	Report
1	(United Kingdom) British Grand Prix	Giuseppe Farina	Giuseppe Farina	Giuseppe Farina	Alfa Romeo	P	Report
2	Monaco Grand Prix	(Argentina) Juan Manuel Fangio	(Argentina) Juan Manuel Fangio	(Argentina) Juan Manuel Fangio	Alfa Romeo	P	Report
3	(United States) Indianapolis 500	(United States) Walt Faulkner	(United States) Johnnie Parsons	(United States) Johnnie Parsons	(United States) Kurtis Kraft-Offenhauser	F	Report
4	(Switzerland) Swiss Grand Prix	(Argentina) Juan Manuel Fangio	Giuseppe Farina	Giuseppe Farina	Alfa Romeo	P	Report
5	(Belgium) Belgian Grand Prix	Giuseppe Farina	Giuseppe Farina	(Argentina) Juan Manuel Fangio	Alfa Romeo	P	Report
6	(France) French Grand Prix	(Argentina) Juan Manuel Fangio	(Argentina) Juan Manuel Fangio	(Argentina) Juan Manuel Fangio	Alfa Romeo	P	Report
7	Italian Grand Prix	(Argentina) Juan Manuel Fangio	(Argentina) Juan Manuel Fangio	Giuseppe Farina	Alfa Romeo	P	Report

=== Scoring system ===
Points were awarded to the top five classified finishers, with an additional point awarded for setting the fastest lap, regardless of finishing position or even classification. Only the best four results counted towards the championship. Shared drives result in half points for each driver if they finished in a points-scoring position. If more than one driver set the same fastest lap time, the fastest lap point would be divided equally between the drivers. Numbers without parentheses are championship points; numbers in parentheses are total points scored. Points were awarded in the following system:

Position	1st	2nd	3rd	4th	5th	FL
Race	8	6	4	3	2	1

=== World Championship of Drivers standings ===
Pos.	Driver	GBR (United Kingdom)	MON (Monaco)	500 (United States)	SUI (Switzerland)	BEL (Belgium)	FRA (France)	ITA	Pts.
1	Giuseppe Farina	1^{P}^{F}	Ret		1^{F}	4^{P}^{F}	7	1	30
2	(Argentina) Juan Manuel Fangio	Ret	1^{P}^{F}		Ret^{P}	1	1^{P}^{F}	Ret^{P}^{F}/(Ret†)	27
3	Luigi Fagioli	2	Ret		2	2	2	(3)	24 (28)
4	(France) Louis Rosier	5	Ret		3	3	6†	4	13
5	Alberto Ascari		2		Ret	5	DNS	(Ret)/2†	11
6	(United States) Johnnie Parsons			1^{F}					9
7	(United States) Bill Holland			2					6
8	Prince Bira	Ret	5		4			Ret	5
9	(United Kingdom) Peter Whitehead		DNS		DNA		3	7	4
=	(Monaco) Louis Chiron	Ret	3		9		Ret	Ret	4
=	(United Kingdom) Reg Parnell	3			DNA		Ret	DNA	4
=	(United States) Mauri Rose			3					4
13	Dorino Serafini							2†	3
=	(France) Yves Giraud-Cabantous	4	DNA		Ret	Ret	8		3
=	(France) Raymond Sommer		4		Ret	Ret	Ret	Ret	3
=	(France) Robert Manzon		Ret				4	Ret	3
=	(United States) Cecil Green			4					3
=	(France) Philippe Étancelin	8	Ret		Ret	Ret	5†	5	3
19	Felice Bonetto	DNA			5		Ret	DNS	2
20	(France) Eugène Chaboud					Ret	5†		1
=	(United States) Joie Chitwood			5†					1
=	(United States) Tony Bettenhausen			5†					1
—	(Switzerland) Toulo de Graffenried	Ret	Ret		6			6	0
—	(United Kingdom) Bob Gerard	6	6						0
—	Luigi Villoresi		Ret		Ret	6	DNS		0
—	(United States) Lee Wallard			6					0
—	(France) Charles Pozzi		DNA				6†		0
—	(Belgium) Johnny Claes	11	7		10	8	Ret	Ret	0
—	(United Kingdom) Cuth Harrison	7	Ret					Ret	0
—	(France) Pierre Levegh		DNA			7	Ret	Ret	0
—	(United States) Walt Faulkner			7^{P}					0
—	Nello Pagani				7				0
—	(United States) Harry Schell		Ret		8				0
—	(United States) George Connor			8					0
—	(United Kingdom) Geoffrey Crossley	Ret				9			0
—	(United Kingdom) David Hampshire	9					Ret		0
—	(United States) Paul Russo			9					0
—	(Switzerland) Toni Branca				11	10			0
—	(United States) Pat Flaherty			10					0
—	(United Kingdom) Brian Shawe-Taylor	10†							0
—	(United Kingdom) Joe Fry	10†							0
—	(United States) Myron Fohr			11					0
—	(United States) Duane Carter			12					0
—	(United States) Mack Hellings			13					0
—	(United States) Jack McGrath			14					0
—	(United States) Troy Ruttman			15					0
—	(United States) Gene Hartley			16					0
—	(United States) Jimmy Davies			17					0
—	(United States) Johnny McDowell			18					0
—	(United States) Walt Brown			19					0
—	(United States) Spider Webb			20					0
—	(United States) Jerry Hoyt			21					0
—	(United States) Walt Ader			22					0
—	(United States) Jackie Holmes			23					0
—	(United States) Jim Rathmann			24					0
—	(Republic of Ireland) Joe Kelly	NC							0
—	Franco Rol		Ret		DNA		Ret	Ret	0
—	(France) Eugène Martin	Ret			Ret				0
—	(Argentina) José Froilán González		Ret				Ret		0
—	(United Kingdom) David Murray	Ret						Ret	0
—	(France) Maurice Trintignant		Ret					Ret	0
—	Clemente Biondetti		DNA					Ret	0
—	Franco Comotti						DNA	Ret	0
—	(United Kingdom) Leslie Johnson	Ret							0
—	(United States) Bill Schindler			Ret					0
—	(United States) Jimmy Jackson			Ret					0
—	(United States) Sam Hanks			Ret					0
—	(United States) Dick Rathmann			Ret					0
—	(United States) Duke Dinsmore			Ret					0
—	(France) Guy Mairesse							Ret	0
—	(West Germany) Paul Pietsch							Ret	0
—	(France) Henri Louveau							Ret	0
—	Consalvo Sanesi							Ret	0
—	(United Kingdom) Peter Walker	Ret†							0
—	(United Kingdom) Tony Rolt	Ret†							0
—	(United States) Henry Banks			Ret†					0
—	(United States) Fred Agabashian			Ret†					0
—	(United States) Bayliss Levrett			Ret†					0
—	(United States) Bill Cantrell			Ret†					0
—	Piero Taruffi							Ret†	0
—	(Argentina) Alfredo Pián		DNS						0
—	(United Kingdom) Raymond Mays	DNA							0
—	(United Kingdom) Duncan Hamilton	DNA							0
—	(France) André Simon		DNA						0
—	(Switzerland) Rudi Fischer				DNA				0
—	(Italy) Luigi Platé							DNA	0
—	(Italy) Franco Bordoni							DNA	0
—	(Italy) Giovanni Bracco							DNA	0
—	(Italy) Luigi de Filippis							DNA	0
Pos.	Driver	GBR (United Kingdom)	MON (Monaco)	500 (United States)	SUI (Switzerland)	BEL (Belgium)	FRA (France)	ITA (Italy)	Pts.

Key
Colour	Result
Gold	Winner
Silver	Second place
Bronze	Third place
Green	Other points position
Blue	Other classified position
Blue	Not classified, finished (NC)
Purple	Not classified, retired (Ret)
Red	Did not qualify (DNQ)
Black	Disqualified (DSQ)
White	Did not start (DNS)
White	Race cancelled (C)
Blank	Did not practice (DNP)
Blank	Excluded (EX)
Blank	Did not arrive (DNA)
Blank	Withdrawn (WD)
Blank	Did not enter (empty cell)
Annotation	Meaning
P	Pole position
F	Fastest lap

- † Position shared between more drivers of the same car

== Non-championship races ==
The following Formula One races, which did not count towards the World Championship of Drivers, were also held in 1950.

Race name	Circuit	Date	Winning driver	Constructor	Report
(France) XI Pau Grand Prix	Pau	10 April	(Argentina) Juan Manuel Fangio	Maserati	Report
(United Kingdom) II Richmond Trophy	Goodwood	10 April	(United Kingdom) Reg Parnell	Maserati	Report
V San Remo Grand Prix	Ospedaletti	16 April	(Argentina) Juan Manuel Fangio	Alfa Romeo	Report
(France) IV Grand Prix de Paris	Montlhéry	30 April	(France) Georges Grignard	(France) Talbot-Lago	Report
(United Kingdom) XII British Empire Trophy	Douglas	15 June	(United Kingdom) Bob Gerard	(United Kingdom) ERA	Report
IV Gran Premio di Bari	Lungomare	9 July	Giuseppe Farina	Alfa Romeo	Report
IV J.C.C. Jersey Road Race	Saint Helier	13 July	(United Kingdom) Peter Whitehead	Ferrari	Report
(France) XII Circuit de l'Albigeois	Albi (Les Planques)	16 July	(France) Louis Rosier	(France) Talbot-Lago	Report
(Netherlands) I Grote Prijs van Nederland	Zandvoort	23 July	(France) Louis Rosier	(France) Talbot-Lago	Report
(Switzerland) III Grand Prix des Nations	Geneva	30 July	(Argentina) Juan Manuel Fangio	Alfa Romeo	Report
(United Kingdom) I Nottingham Trophy	Gamston	7 August	(United Kingdom) David Hampshire	Maserati	Report
(United Kingdom) IV Ulster Trophy	Dundrod	12 August	(United Kingdom) Peter Whitehead	Ferrari	Report
XIX Coppa Acerbo	Pescara	15 August	(Argentina) Juan Manuel Fangio	Alfa Romeo	Report
(United Kingdom) I Sheffield Telegraph Trophy	Gamston	19 August	(United Kingdom) Cuth Harrison	(United Kingdom) ERA	Report
(United Kingdom) II BRDC International Trophy	Silverstone	26 August	Giuseppe Farina	Alfa Romeo	Report
(United Kingdom) III Goodwood Trophy	Goodwood	30 September	(United Kingdom) Reg Parnell	(United Kingdom) BRM	Report
(Spain) X Gran Premio de Penya Rhin	Pedralbes	29 October	Alberto Ascari	Ferrari	Report
Grand Prix of Chile	Pedro de Valdivia Norte	17 December	(Argentina) Juan Manuel Fangio	Maserati	Report
