= Johnny Wakefield =

English racing driver (1915–1942)

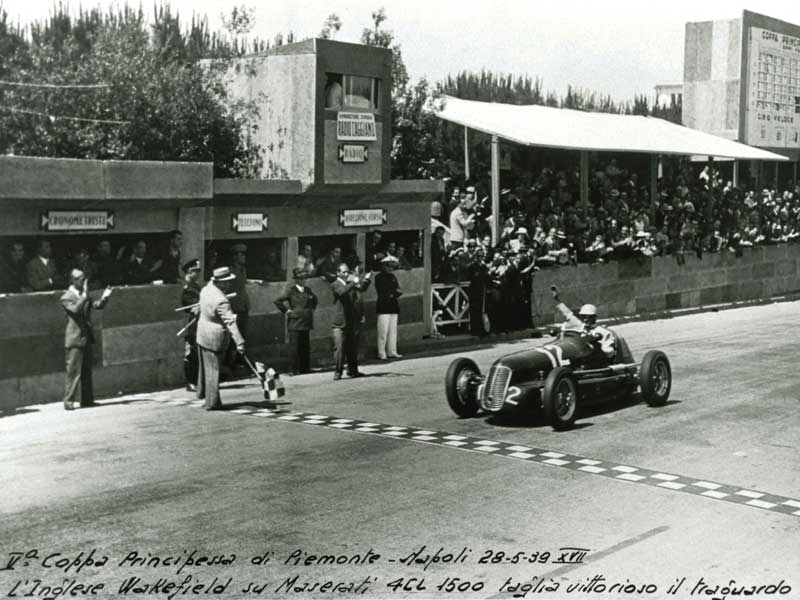
Wakefield wins in Naples on 28 May 1939

John Peter Wakefield (5 April 1915 in Marylebone, London – 24 April 1942 in Wargrave, Berkshire) was an English racing car driver.

He debuted in a British Alta (1936), next year in a Maserati 6CM at Gran Premio di Firenze, 10th place (1937), ran a British ERA (1938), and became the second to own a Maserati 4CL (1939), in which he won the Grand Prix of Naples, the French GP in Picardy, and the Grand Prix de l´Albigeois, coming in second at Rheims and third at the Prix de Berne.

During the Second World War Wakefield joined the Fleet Air Arm. He was killed in a flying accident whilst a test pilot working for Vickers Armstrong.
