= Alfredo Pián =

Argentine racing driver (1912–1990)

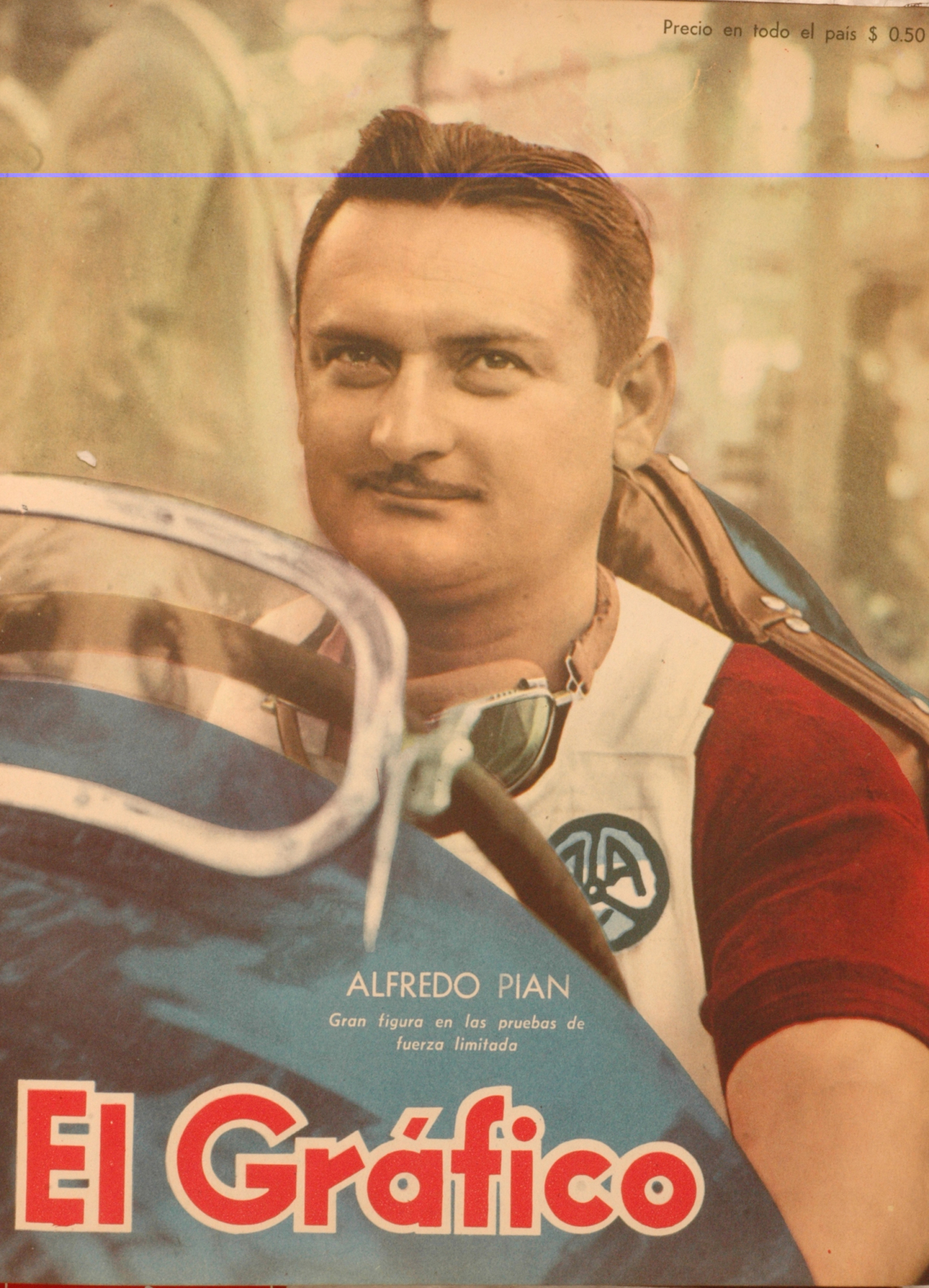
- Born: 21 October 1912; Las Rosas, Santa Fe
- Died: 25 July 1990 (aged 77); Las Rosas, Santa Fe

Formula One World Championship career
- Nationality: (Argentina) Argentine
- Active years: 1950
- Team: Scuderia Achille Varzi
- Entries: 1 (0 starts)
- Championships: 0
- Wins: 0
- Podiums: 0
- Career points: 0
- Pole positions: 0
- Fastest laps: 0
- First entry: 1950 Monaco Grand Prix

Alfredo Pián (October 21, 1912 – July 25, 1990) was an Argentine racing driver. He entered the 1950 Monaco Grand Prix with a Maserati 4CLT run by Scuderia Achille Varzi. During the Saturday practice sessions, Pián, who had the sixth fastest time at that point, spun on an oil patch and crashed against the guard-rail, being thrown out of the cockpit. He sustained leg injuries and was not able to start the race, and the injury ended his career.

== Complete Formula One World Championship results ==
(key)

Year	Entrant	Chassis	Engine	1	2	3	4	5	6	7	WDC	Points
1950	Scuderia Achille Varzi	Maserati 4CLT/48	Maserati Straight-4	GBR	MON; DNS	500	SUI	BEL	FRA	ITA	NC	0
