= Circuit de Meyrin =

Defunct Motor racing Circuit

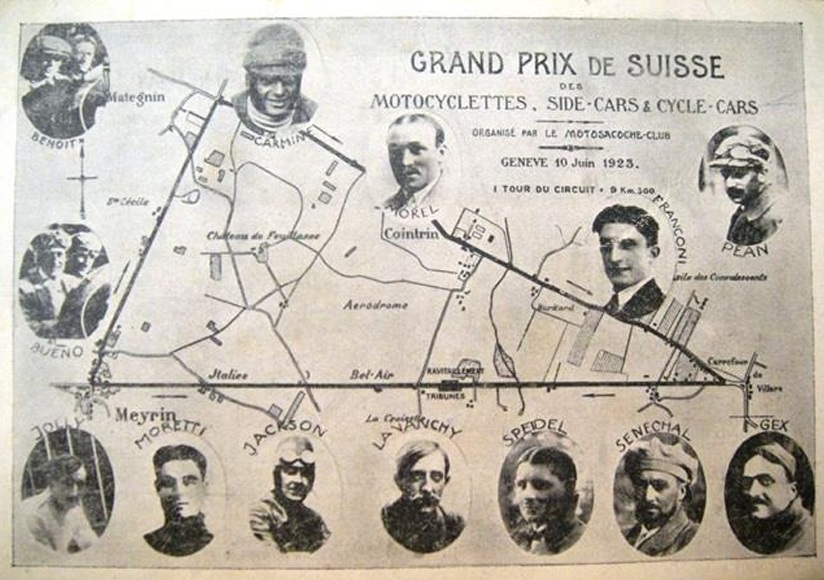
- Promotional postcard for the 1923 event.
- Location: Meyrin, Switzerland
- Coordinates: 46.221941°N 6.106254°E
- Opened: 9 June 1923; 102 years ago
- Closed: 1931; 95 years ago
- Major events: Geneva Grand Prix (1931); Swiss motorcycle Grand Prix (1923–1929)
- Length: 9.300 km (5.779 mi)
- Turns: 3

The Circuit de Meyrin was a temporary motor racing circuit in Meyrin, Switzerland. It had a triangular layout of 9.3 km (5.78 mi) starting from Route de Meyrin, turning right on Avenue de Vaudagne, then right again on Route de Prevessin (now Rue Robert-Adrien-Stierlin), before rejoining Route de Meyrin at Bouchet to complete the lap, with grandstands for spectators built on Route de Meyrin. The location of the circuit was chosen due to its proximity to the city.

== History ==
The track was first used in 1923 hosting the Swiss motorcycle Grand Prix as well as grand prix for sidecars and for cyclecars which was the first car race in Switzerland. The success of the first event propelled the track to prominence, making it the premier motorsport event in Switzerland attracting international talent for the 1924 event, including racing for motorcycles (250cc, 350cc and 500cc), sidecars (600cc and 1000cc), voiturettes and cyclecars (750cc, 1100cc and 1500cc).

Racing at the circuit continued throughout the 1920s until the final event held at the track was the 1931 Geneva Grand Prix. The event was won by Marcel Lehoux, however a crash involving the car of Stanisław Czaykowski resulted in the death of a bystander in a house adjacent to the circuit. As a result of the crash, races at the circuit were discontinued because it was determined that racing on public roads in towns and near houses was too unsafe.

Today, most of the public roads that made up the circuit are still in use, however a section road was removed to make way for the expansion of Geneva Airport.

== Results ==
=== Swiss motorcycle Grand Prix Winners by year ===
Year	125cc		175cc		250cc		350cc		500cc		Report
Year	Rider	Manufacturer	Rider	Manufacturer	Rider	Manufacturer	Rider	Manufacturer	Rider	Manufacturer	Report
1929	(Switzerland) "Crotti"	Zehnder	(Switzerland) Georges Trezza	Allegro	(Switzerland) Otto Zehnder	Zehnder	(France) François Gaussorgues	Monet-Goyon	(Switzerland) Emil Frey	Radco	Report
1928	(Switzerland) Paul Lehmann	Moser	(Italy) Alfredo Panella	Ladetto-Blatto	(United Kingdom) Cecil Ashby	OK-Supreme	(United Kingdom) Wal Handley	Motosacoche	(United Kingdom) Wal Handley	Motosacoche	Report
1927	(Switzerland) O. Graf	Zehnder	(France) Alexandre Hommaire	Monet-Goyon	(Italy) Licinio Lasagni	Moto Guzzi	(United Kingdom) Jimmie Simpson	AJS	(Republic of Ireland) Stanley Woods	Norton	Report

Year	250cc		350cc		500cc		1000cc		Report
Year	Rider	Manufacturer	Rider	Manufacturer	Rider	Manufacturer	Rider	Manufacturer	Report
1924	(Switzerland) Léon Divorne	Condor	(United Kingdom) Tommy de la Haye	Sunbeam	(United Kingdom) Graham Walker	Sunbeam			Report
1923	(Switzerland) Paul Dinkel	Condor	(Italy) Isacco Mariani	Garelli	(France) Paul Péan	Peugeot			Report

=== Geneva Grand Prix Winners by year ===
Year	Winning driver	Winning constructor	Report
1931	(France) Marcel Lehoux	(France) Bugatti	Report
