= Toni Branca =

Swiss racing driver (1916–1985)

- Born: 15 September 1916; Sion, Valais, Switzerland
- Died: 10 May 1985 (aged 68); Sierre, Valais, Switzerland

Formula One World Championship career
- Nationality: (Switzerland) Swiss
- Active years: 1950–1951
- Team: non-works Maserati
- Entries: 3
- Championships: 0
- Wins: 0
- Podiums: 0
- Career points: 0
- Pole positions: 0
- Fastest laps: 0
- First entry: 1950 Swiss Grand Prix
- Last entry: 1951 German Grand Prix

Antonio Branca (15 September 1916, Sion, Switzerland – 10 May 1985, Sierre, Switzerland) was a Formula One racing car driver from Switzerland who competed in three World Championship races. His motor racing career was allegedly financed by an admiring Belgian countess, the Vicomtesse de Walkiers. Branca mainly competed in privately owned Maserati 4CLT, in Formula One and Two races.

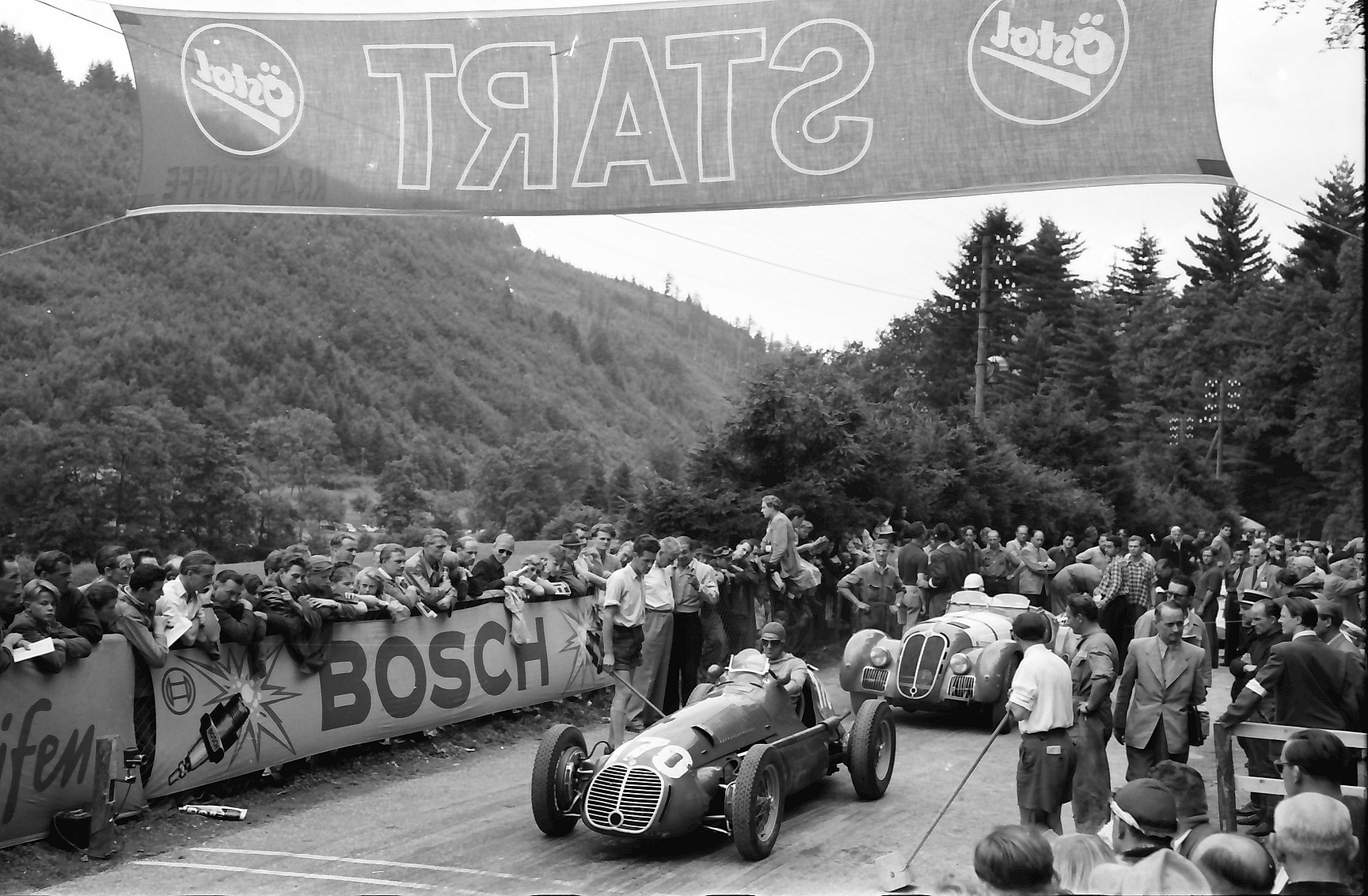
Branca in a Maserati 4CLT at Schauinsland in 1951

Branca made his Formula One debut at the 1950 Swiss Grand Prix, finishing 11th, and briefly led the non-championship Formula One race in Circuit des Nations at Geneva in a Simca-Gordini. He scored a number of top-six placings in other minor races, his best finish being fourth at a Formula Two race at the Aix les Bains Circuit du Lac, before entering the Belgian Grand Prix and finishing in tenth place. Branca continued to race in 1951, retiring from the Formula One German Grand Prix and finishing sixth in the non-championship Pescara Grand Prix, but finished competing in Grand Prix racing at the end of the year.

Branca competed at a lower level until the mid-1950s, racing in hillclimbs and competed twice in the 24 Hours of Le Mans race. Racing with a Moretti 750cc, in 1955 the car was not ready and did not get to the starting line in time, and in 1956 the car broke down before his turn to drive.

== Complete Formula One World Championship results ==
(key)

Year	Entrant	Chassis	Engine	1	2	3	4	5	6	7	8	WDC	Points
1950	Scuderia Achille Varzi	Maserati 4CLT	Maserati Straight-4	GBR	MON	500	SUI; 11					NC	0
1950	Antonio Branca	Maserati 4CLT	Maserati Straight-4					BEL; 10	FRA	ITA		NC	0
1951	Antonio Branca	Maserati 4CLT/48	Maserati Straight-4	SUI	500	BEL	FRA	GBR	GER; Ret	ITA	ESP; DNA	NC	0
