= Maserati 4CL and 4CLT =

Single-seat racing car

Maserati 4CL
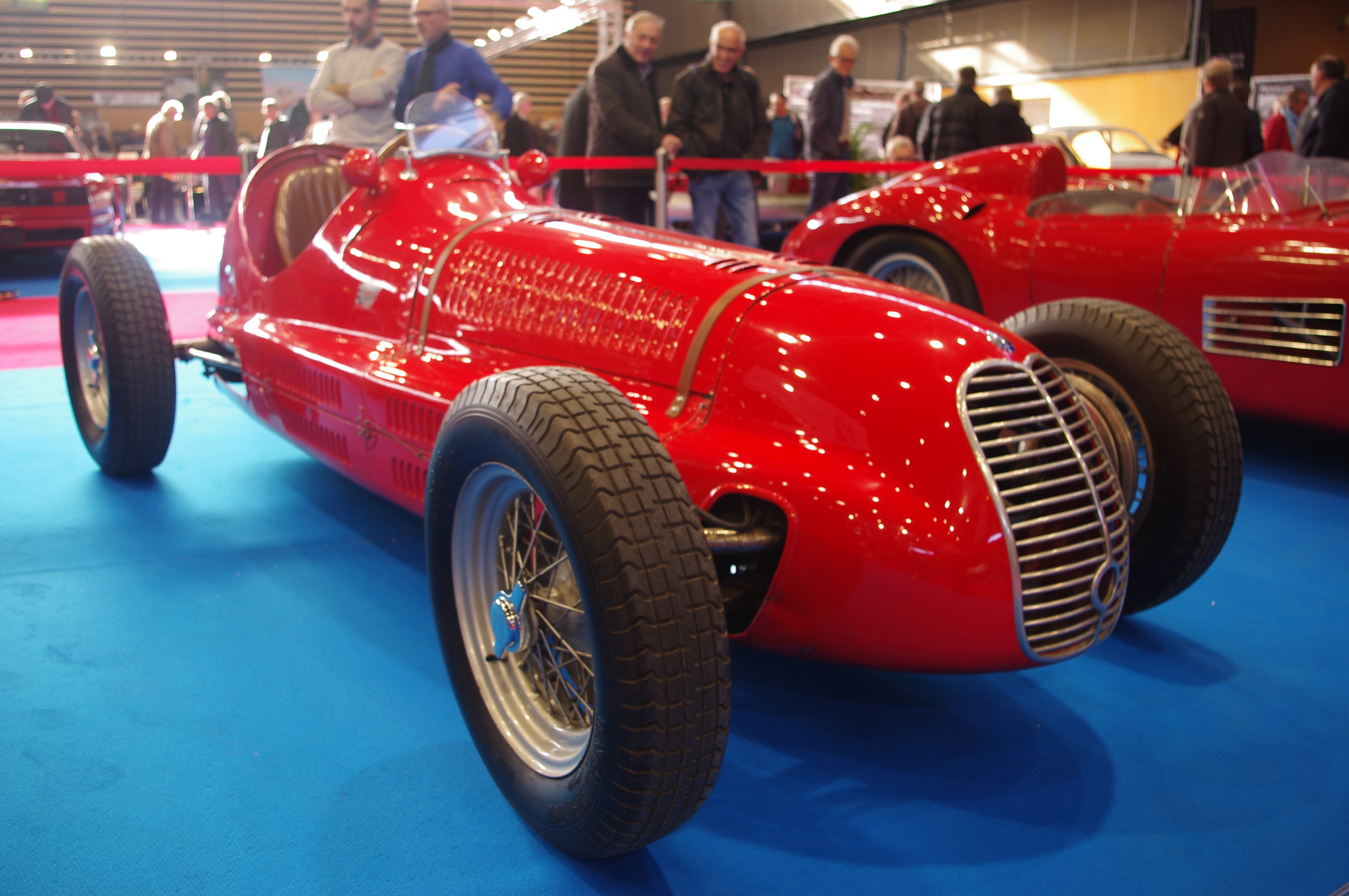
- Category: Voiturette / Formula One
- Constructor: Maserati
- Designer: Ernesto Maserati
- Production: 1939–1950
- Predecessor: Maserati 6CM
- Successor: Maserati A6GCM

Technical specifications
- Chassis: Light alloy ladder
- Suspension (front): Independent, torsion springs and friction dampers
- Suspension (rear): Live axle, leaf springs and friction dampers
- Axle track: F: 1,250 mm (49.2 in); R: 1,276 mm (50.2 in)
- Wheelbase: 2,500 mm (98.4 in)
- Engine: 1,491 cc (91 cu in) straight-4 single-stage supercharger front-mounted
- Transmission: Maserati 4-speed manual
- Tyres: Pirelli

Competition history
- Notable entrants: Officine Alfieri Maserati; Scuderia Platé; Scuderia Milano; Scuderia Ambrosiana
- Notable drivers: (United Kingdom) Johnnie Wakefield (Italy) Luigi Villoresi (Switzerland) Toulo de Graffenried (United Kingdom) Reg Parnell (Thailand) B. Bira (France) Pierre Levegh (Monaco) Louis Chiron (Italy) Giuseppe Farina (Argentina) Juan Manuel Fangio (France) Maurice Trintignant (Italy) Tazio Nuvolari (France) Raymond Sommer
- Debut: 1939 Tripoli Grand Prix
Wins
6 (pre-war Voiturette)
25 (post-war Grand Prix)
0 (Formula One)

The Maserati 4CL and its derived sister model the Maserati 4CLT are single-seat open-wheel Grand Prix racing cars that were designed and built by Maserati. The 4CL was introduced at the beginning of the 1939 season, as a rival to the Alfa Romeo 158 and various ERA models in the voiturette class of international Grand Prix motor racing. Although racing ceased during World War II, the 4CL was one of the front running models at the resumption of racing in the late 1940s. Experiments with two-stage supercharging and tubular chassis construction eventually led to the introduction of the revised 4CLT model in 1948. The 4CLT was steadily upgraded and updated over the following two years, resulting in the ultimate 4CLT/50 model, introduced for the inaugural year of the Formula One World Championship in 1950. In the immediate post-war period, and the first two years of the Formula One category, the 4CLT was the car of choice for many privateer entrants, leading to numerous examples being involved in most races during this period.

== The 4CL ==
=== Design ===
In the late 1930s, continued rapid development in the increasingly competitive international voiturette class, and the introduction of the Alfa Romeo 158 and ERA B- and C-type models, forced the Maserati brothers into designing a new, square-bore, inline-4-cylinder engine, with a bore and stroke of 78 mm for a total displacement of 1,490.85 cc (1.5 L). This new engine developed 30–50 bhp more than the previous inline-6, the increase mostly achieved through an increase to four valves per cylinder, coupled to the use of a more powerful supercharger and a small increase in the compression ratio. Following customary Maserati practice, the engine was mounted into a chassis design almost identical to that of the 4CL's predecessor: the Maserati 6CM. Conventional in its architecture, twin box-section spars ran the length of the car joined, ladder-fashion, by smaller cross members, although the 4CL design did incorporate more aluminium componentry than its forebear. Although near-identical in its wheelbase, the 4CL's track was a full 5 cm (1.97 in) wider than the 6CM, and sat lower thanks to repositioned spring hangers.

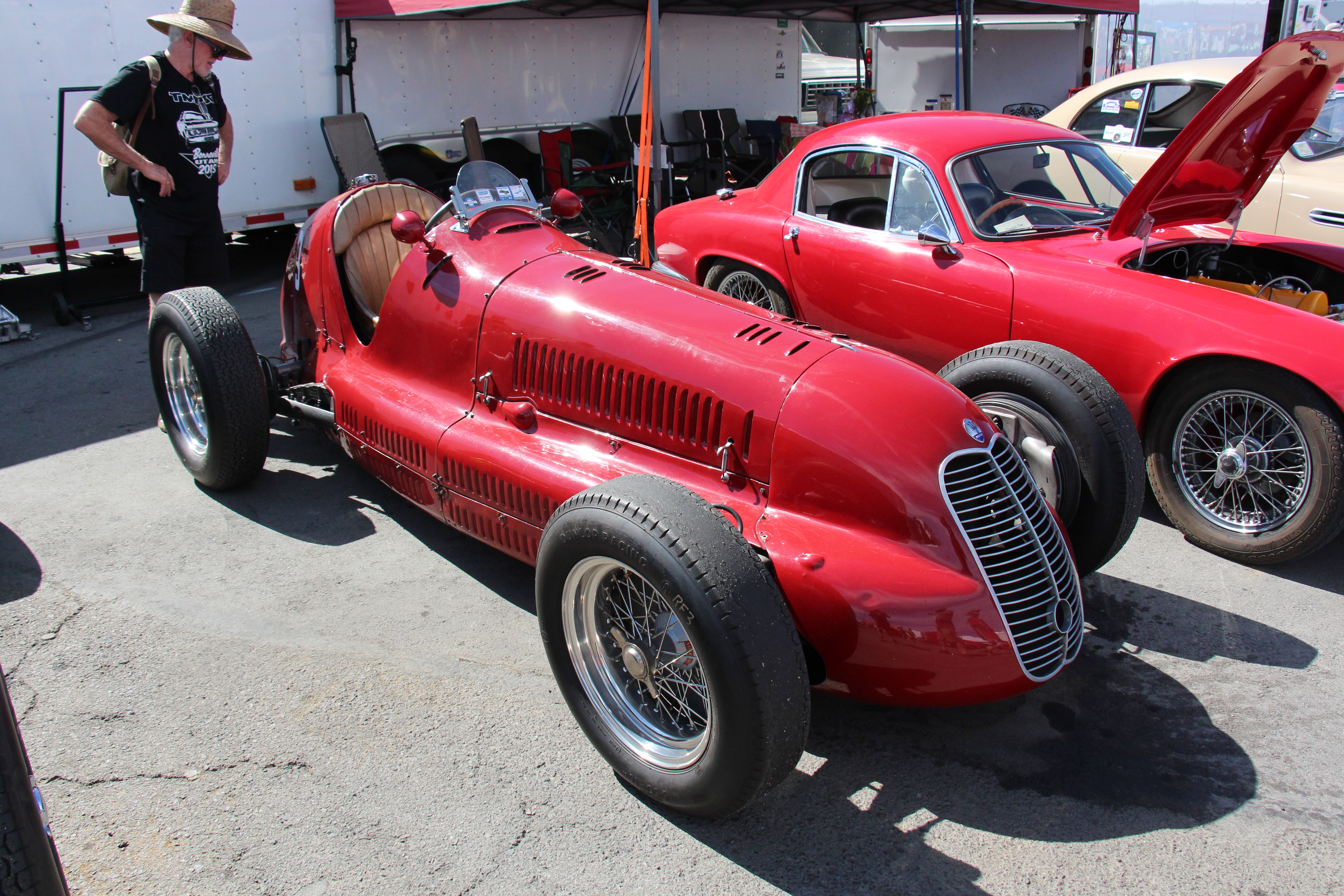
A 1939 Maserati 4CL

Enveloping this rather conservative chassis was a low, curvaceous alloy-panel body, built in-house by Maserati. Maserati also built a streamlined version of the 4CL from the outset. Continued engine development, in response to Alfa Romeo's post-war introduction of two-stage supercharging, began to expose weaknesses in the chassis design. In an attempt to improve torsional rigidity Maserati began to experiment with tubular section chassis members. These experimental models ran alongside conventional 4CLs throughout the 1947 season, and eventually led to the introduction of the 4CLT in 1948.

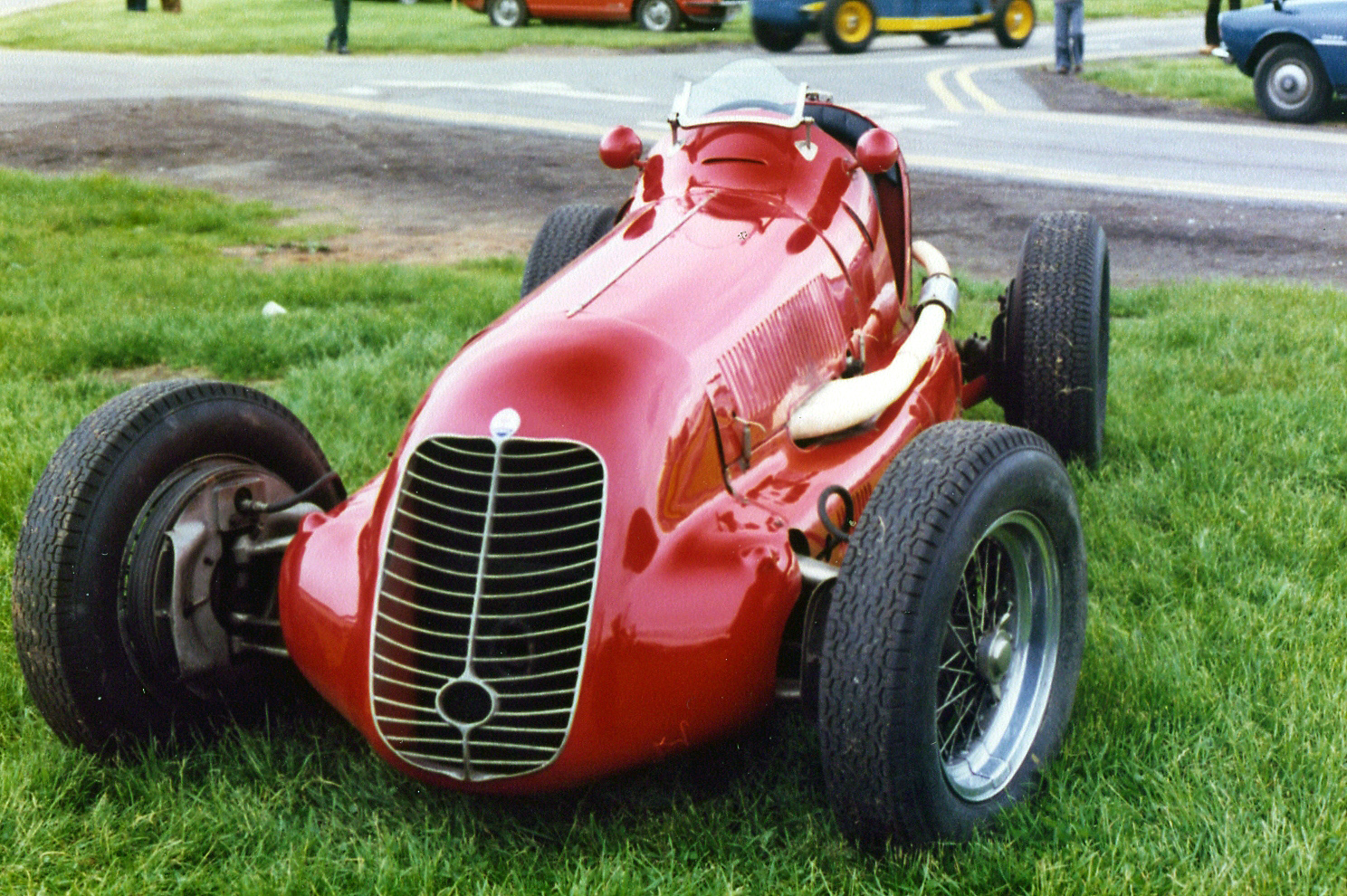
A Maserati 4CL at Oulton Park circa 1982

=== Race history ===
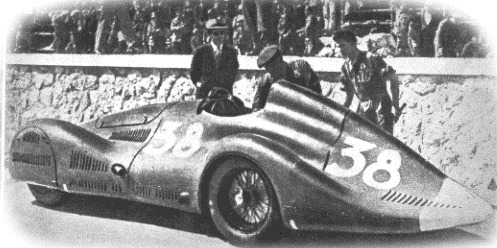
4CL Streamliner at Tripoli Grand Prix on 7 May 1939, where it quickly broke down, driven by Luigi Villoresi (1909–1997).

In the hands of Luigi Villoresi the streamliner took pole position on the 4CL's race debut at the 1939 Tripoli Grand Prix, ahead of Mercedes' brand new W165s. However, both it and two of the three conventional 4CLs entered retired early in the race with engine troubles, leaving the Silver Arrows to take the victory. Embarrassingly for the works team, following this disappointing debut the 4CL's first taste of victory came in the hands of privateer Johnnie Wakefield at the Naples Grand Prix, two races later. Through the remainder of 1939 voiturette races Wakefield took two further victories, and the works' 4CLs picked up another two, before the outbreak of war curtailed international competition. Villoresi took the 4CL to victory in the 1940 Targa Florio, but with entry restricted to Axis countries, and only Maserati fielding a factory team, the opposition was hardly world class.

On the resumption of competition in 1946 the Maserati 4CL proved the class of the field. Luigi Villoresi immediately returned to winning ways, taking victory in the first race following the cessation of hostilities: the 1946 Nice Grand Prix. Tazio Nuvolari and Giorgio Pelassa both took wins in 4CLs, but it was Raymond Sommer and his 4CL who dominated the season. 1947 would prove to be the 4CL's most successful season and, despite Alfa Romeo fielding the revamped 158 and new 308, Maserati drivers picked up 10 individual race victories.

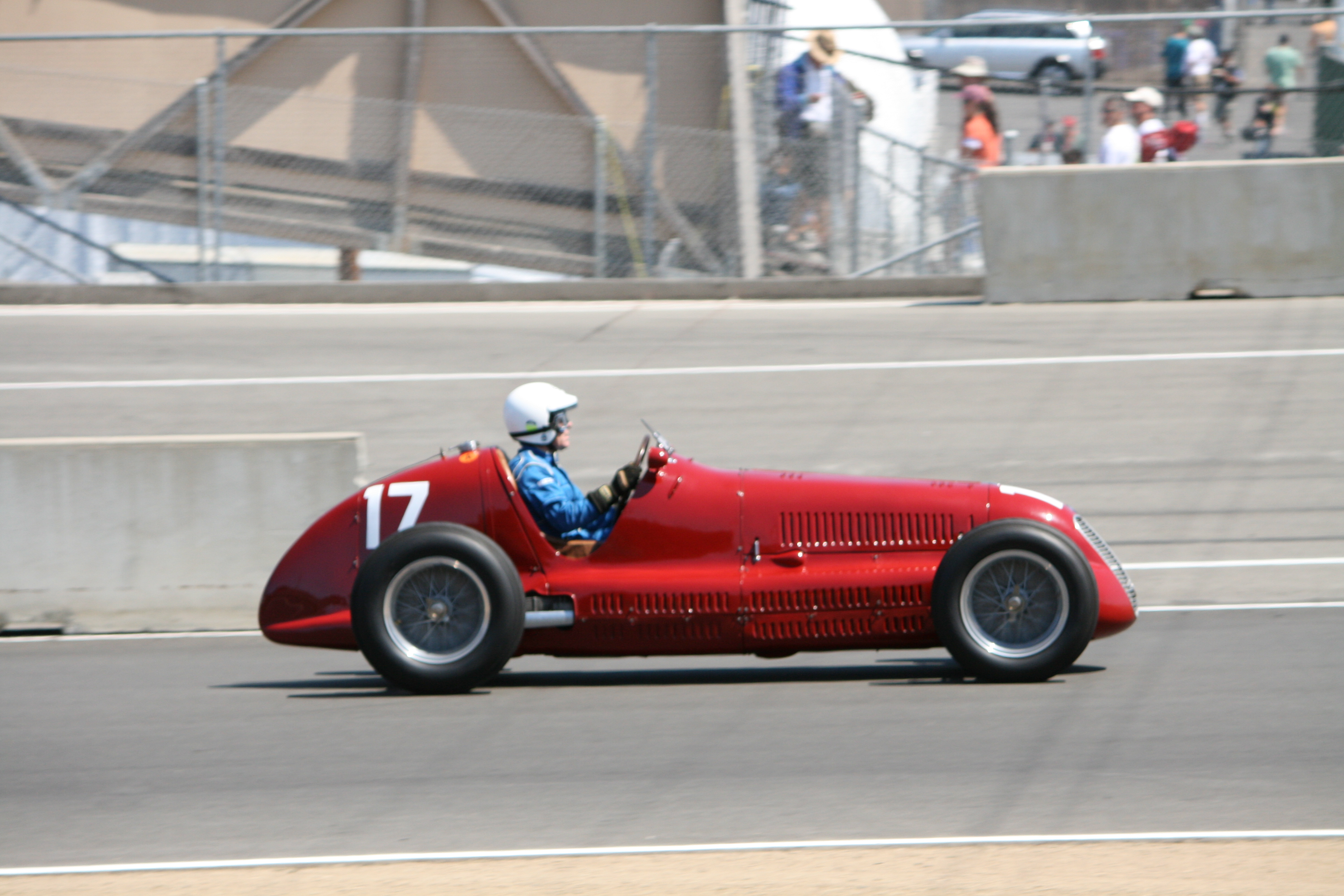
Maserati 4CL

After the replacement of the factory team's 4CLs by the new 4CLT, many examples of the older cars found their way into privateer hands. It was owing to the 4CL's popularity with privateer entrants that many were still being run in top-flight competition at the outset of the Formula One World Championship in 1950.

== The 4CLT ==
Maserati 4CLT
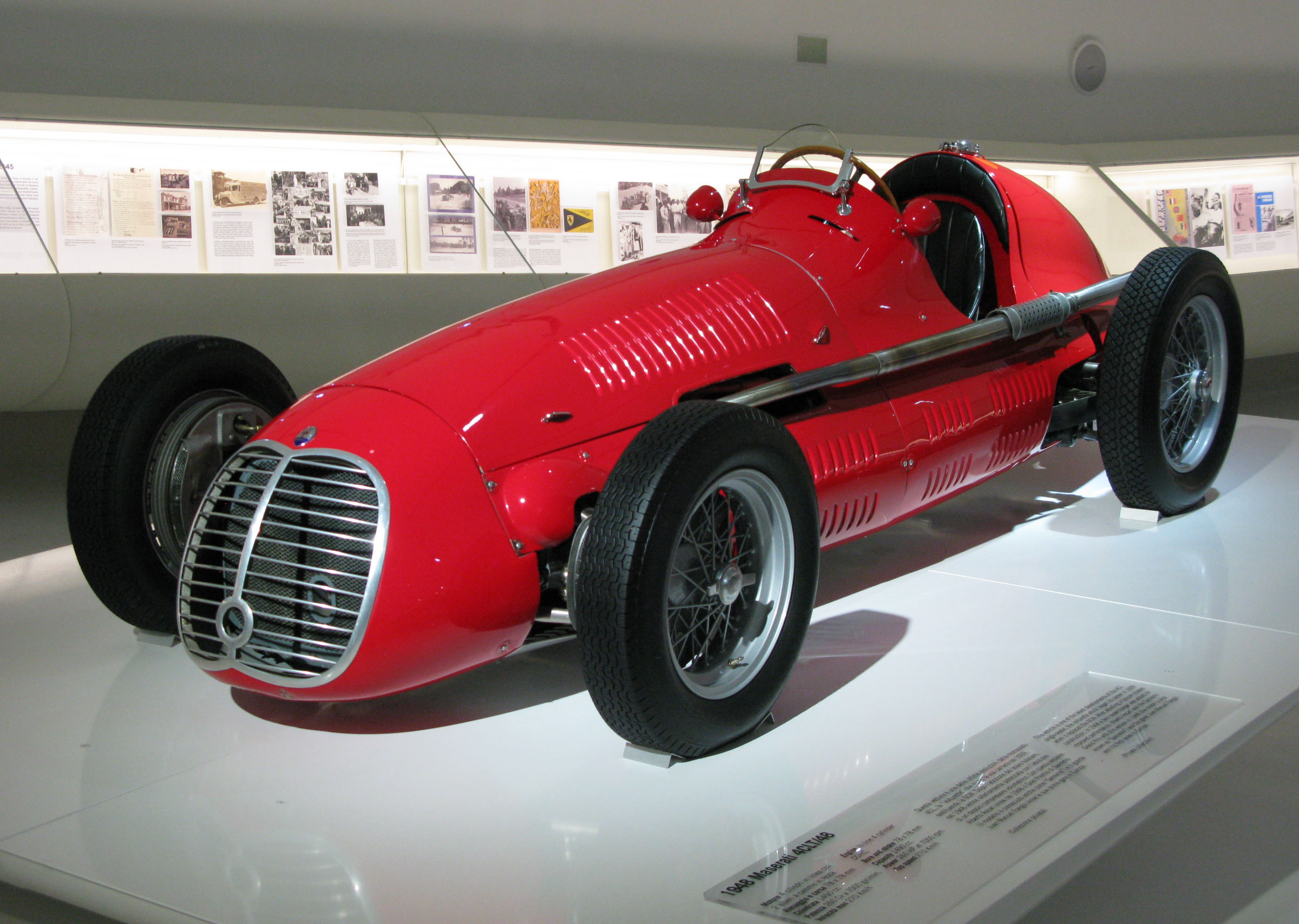
- Category: Voiturette / Formula One
- Constructor: Maserati
- Designers: Ernesto Maserati; Alberto Massimino; Vittorio Bellentani; Arialdo Ruggieri

Technical specifications
- Chassis: Light alloy tubular ladder
- Suspension (front): Independent, coil springs and hydraulic dampers
- Suspension (rear): Live axle, leaf springs and hydraulic dampers
- Axle track: F: 1,250 mm (49.2 in); R: 1,200 mm (47.2 in)
- Wheelbase: 2,500 mm (98.4 in)
- Engine: Maserati 1491 cc straight-4, two-stage supercharger, front-mounted
- Transmission: Maserati 4-speed manual
- Tyres: Pirelli / Ernesto / Dunlop

Competition history
- Notable entrants: Officine Alfieri Maserati; Scuderia Platé; Scuderia Ambrosiana; Scuderia Achille Varzi; Automóvil Club Argentino; Scuderia Milano
- Notable drivers: (Italy) Luigi Villoresi (United Kingdom) Reg Parnell (Switzerland) Toulo de Graffenried (Argentina) Juan Manuel Fangio (Monaco) Louis Chiron (Thailand) B. Bira (United States) Harry Schell (Italy) Giuseppe Farina
- Debut: 1948 San Remo Grand Prix
Wins
18 (post-war Grand Prix)
0 (WC Formula One)
5 (non-Champ F1)

Chassis and engine changes made to the experimental 4CLs eventually coalesced into the 4CLT, the appended T denoting its tubular chassis. The improvements in torsional rigidity that the tubular construction brought were required to counteract the increases in torque and power resulting from the twin-supercharger upgrade of the elderly inline-4 engine. Power was up to approximately 260 bhp (194 kW), from the 4CL's 220. Other changes included the use of roller bearings for the crankshaft, forged (rather than cast) rear suspension components, and the chassis was designed to run with hydraulic dampers from the outset.

=== 4CLT/48 Sanremo ===
The first variant of the 4CLT earned its "Sanremo" nickname from the first race for which it was entered: the 1948 San Remo Grand Prix. The name stuck, as Alberto Ascari took his 4CLT to victory in its maiden race appearance. A portent of things to come, Villoresi and Reg Parnell won five of the 1948 season's remaining races. In the first year of the Formula One World Championship, a Sanremo scored what was to be the Maserati's best Championship finish, when Louis Chiron took third place at his home Grand Prix: the 1950 Monaco Grand Prix. The last 4CLT variant to compete in the World Championship was a 4CLT/48 modified by the Arzani-Volpini team, that failed to even qualify for the 1955 Italian Grand Prix.

==== 1949 ====
Maserati 4CLT/49 at Goodwood 2010

For 1949, minor modifications to the brake drums, switching from vanes to slits for cooling, along with small changes to the cockpit control layout and a repositioned oil header-tank resulted in a car sometimes referred to as the 4CLT/49. It was never known as such by the factory. The Ascari/Villoresi/Parnell trio, joined by Juan Manuel Fangio and Toulo de Graffenried, took up where they had left off the previous season, winning nine of the first fifteen races of 1949, including de Graffenried's victory in the British Grand Prix. However, the second half of the season only saw three further wins, as increasingly competitive Ferrari and Talbot cars squeezed out the Maseratis in most major races.

==== 1950–1951 ====
1950 saw the introduction of the FIA World Championship of Drivers. In response to improvements to the Alfa 158 and the already competitive Ferrari and Talbot, Maserati again upgraded the 4CLT's engine. A multi-part crankshaft, lightened and balanced rods, a more powerful pair of superchargers and changes to the ignition timing took engine output up to a claimed 280 bhp (209 kW). Coupled to shedding 10 kg (22 lb) from the car's weight, this brought the Maserati up to near-Alfa levels of performance. Although moderately competitive in short runs, the final upgrades proved to be too much for the decade-old powerplant's design and the 4CLT's Grand Prix performance was hindered by engine failures. The season's only Formula One wins came in non-Championship events. Fangio won the Pau Grand Prix on the same day as Parnell took the Richmond Trophy at Goodwood. David Hampshire won the Nottingham Trophy later in the year. Fangio also won the Formula Two Ramparts Grand Prix, at Angoulême, in a 4CLT chassis fitted with an A6GCM engine. The Milano team modified a 4CLT for use in 1950 and 1951, but without success.

Also for 1951 B. Bira modified his '49-spec 4CLT to accept a more powerful, 4,450 cc (271.6 cu in), naturally aspirated OSCA V12 engine. This engine developed around 300 bhp (224 kW). With it Bira won the Goodwood race early in the season, but in its only World Championship appearance, at the 1951 Spanish Grand Prix, it retired on the first lap.

=== 4CLT/50 ===
In late 1949 a number (two or three, depending on source) of the remaining Sanremo cars were converted for use in the Temporada series Formula Libre races in Buenos Aires, Argentina, in the 1949 to 1950 summer season. This model was referred to as the 4CLT/50; although that name is sometimes also applied to the 1950-specification Formula One cars, the Temporada cars are the only ones that were referred to as such by the factory. The modifications were mostly restricted to enlargement of the engine capacity to 1,719 cc (104.9 cu in). Despite these improvements the series was dominated by Ferrari, and following the final race the cars were shipped back to Italy and reconverted to Formula One specifications.

=== The Platé 4CLT ===
A long term campaigner of Maserati automobiles, Enrico Platé recognised the Maserati's shortcomings as a Formula One vehicle, and converted a 4CLT/48 into the Maserati-Platé 4CLT Formula Two variant. As F2 was for naturally aspirated cars, the first step was to remove the superchargers. After this, to counteract the resulting loss in performance, the compression ratio was more than doubled and capacity was upped to the class limit of 2.0 L (122.05 cu in). With the lower power output from the revised engine, weight was shed and handling sharpened by reducing the wheelbase.

=== Final race wins ===
De Graffenried won the Richmond Trophy, and Giuseppe Farina the Paris Grand Prix, in 1951, but with the switch to Formula Two rules for the World Championship from 1952 onwards, the old 4CLT chassis were found to be overweight and underpowered in comparison to their newer rivals. Despite having been the mainstay of top-flight racing since the end of the 1930s, the 4CL and 4CLT rapidly fell from favour, as smaller and lighter machines began to emerge from European factories still recovering from the effects of war.

Today, many 4CL and 4CLT models survive and are regularly campaigned in historic motorsport events, as well as being on static display in museums.

== Technical data ==
| Technical data | 4CL | 4CLT/48 | 4CLT/50 |
|---|---|---|---|
| Engine: | Front mounted 4-cylinder in-line engine |
| displacement: | 1491 cm^{3} |
| Bore x stroke: | 78 x 78 mm |
| Max power at rpm: | 220 hp at 6 000 rpm | 260 hp at 7 000 rpm | 280 hp at 7 000 rpm |
| Valve control: | 2 overhead camshafts, 4 valves per cylinder |
| Compression: | 6.5:1 | 6.0:1 |
| Carburetor: | Single Weber 45DCO | Double Weber 50DCO | Double Weber 52DCO |
| Upload: | Roots compressor | Double Roots compressors |
| Gearbox: | 4-speed manual |
| suspension front: | Double cross links, torsion springs | Double cross links, coil springs |
| suspension rear: | Rigid rear axle, leaf springs |
| Brakes: | Hydraulic drum brakes |
| Chassis & body: | Box beam frame with aluminum body | Ladder frame with aluminum body |
| Wheelbase: | 250 cm |
| Dry weight: | 630 kg | | 620 kg |
| Top speed: | 250 km/h | 270 km/h | 280 km/h |

== Complete European Championship results ==
(key)

| Year | Entrant | Chassis | Engine | Drivers | 1 | 2 | 3 | 4 |
|---|---|---|---|---|---|---|---|---|
| 1939 | P. Pietsch | 4CL | Maserati 4CL 1.5 L4s | | BEL | FRA | GER | SUI |
| 1939 | P. Pietsch | 4CL | Maserati 4CL 1.5 L4s | (Nazi Germany) Paul Pietsch | | | | Ret |
| 1939 | J. Wakefield | 4CL | Maserati 4CL 1.5 L4s | (United Kingdom) John Wakefield | | | | 12 |
| 1939 | G. Rocco | 4CL | Maserati 4CL 1.5 L4s | (Kingdom of Italy) Giovanni Rocco | | | | Ret |

== Complete Formula One World Championship results ==
(key)

| Year | Entrant/s | Chassis/ | Engine | Tyres | Driver/s | 1 | 2 | 3 | 4 | 5 | 6 | 7 | 8 | 9 |
|---|---|---|---|---|---|---|---|---|---|---|---|---|---|---|
| 1950 | Scuderia Ambrosiana | 4CLT/48 | Maserati 4CLT 1.5 L4s | D | | GBR | MON | 500 | SUI | BEL | FRA | ITA | | |
| 1950 | Scuderia Ambrosiana | 4CLT/48 | Maserati 4CLT 1.5 L4s | D | (United Kingdom) David Murray | Ret | | | | | | Ret | | |
| 1950 | Scuderia Ambrosiana | 4CLT/48 | Maserati 4CLT 1.5 L4s | D | (United Kingdom) David Hampshire | 9 | | | | | Ret | | | |
| 1950 | Scuderia Ambrosiana | 4CLT/48 | Maserati 4CLT 1.5 L4s | D | (United Kingdom) Reg Parnell | | | | | | Ret | | | |
| 1950 | Officine Alfieri Maserati | 4CLT/48 | Maserati 4CLT 1.5 L4s | P | (Monaco) Louis Chiron | Ret | 3 | | 9 | | Ret | Ret | | |
| 1950 | Officine Alfieri Maserati | 4CLT/48 | Maserati 4CLT 1.5 L4s | P | (Italy) Franco Rol | | Ret | | | | Ret | Ret | | |
| 1950 | Enrico Platé | 4CLT/48 | Maserati 4CLT 1.5 L4s | P | (Switzerland) Toulo de Graffenried | Ret | Ret | | 6 | | | 6 | | |
| 1950 | Enrico Platé | 4CLT/48 | Maserati 4CLT 1.5 L4s | P | (Thailand) B. Bira | Ret | 5 | | 4 | | | Ret | | |
| 1950 | Joe Fry | 4CL | Maserati 4CL 1.5 L4s | D | (United Kingdom) Joe Fry | 10^{1} | | | | | | | | |
| 1950 | Joe Fry | 4CL | Maserati 4CL 1.5 L4s | D | (United Kingdom) Brian Shawe-Taylor | 10^{1} | | | | | | | | |
| 1950 | Scuderia Achille Varzi | 4CLT/48 | Maserati 4CLT 1.5 L4s | P | (Argentina) José Froilán González | | Ret | | | | Ret | | | |
| 1950 | Scuderia Achille Varzi | 4CLT/48 | Maserati 4CLT 1.5 L4s | P | (Argentina) Alfredo Pián | | DNS | | | | | | | |
| 1950 | Scuderia Achille Varzi | 4CLT/48 | Maserati 4CLT 1.5 L4s | P | (Italy) Nello Pagani | | | | 7 | | | | | |
| 1950 | Scuderia Achille Varzi | 4CL | Maserati 4CL 1.5 L4s | P | (Switzerland) Toni Branca | | | | 11 | | | | | |
| 1950 | Scuderia Milano | 4CLT/50 | Speluzzi 1.5 L4s | P | (Italy) Felice Bonetto | | | | 5 | | Ret | | | |
| 1950 | Scuderia Milano | 4CLT/50 | Speluzzi 1.5 L4s | P | (Italy) Franco Comotti | | | | | | | Ret | | |
| 1950 | Antonio Branca | 4CL | Maserati 4CL 1.5 L4s | P | (Switzerland) Toni Branca | | | | | 10 | | | | |
| 1950 | Paul Pietsch | 4CLT/48 | Maserati 4CLT 1.5 L4s | P | (West Germany) Paul Pietsch | | | | | | | Ret | | |
| 1951 | Enrico Platé | 4CLT/48 | Maserati 4CLT 1.5 L4s | P | | SUI | 500 | BEL | FRA | GBR | GER | ITA | ESP | |
| 1951 | Enrico Platé | 4CLT/48 | Maserati 4CLT 1.5 L4s | P | (Monaco) Louis Chiron | 7 | | | | | | | | |
| 1951 | Enrico Platé | 4CLT/48 | Maserati 4CLT 1.5 L4s | P | (United States) Harry Schell | 12 | | | Ret | | | | | |
| 1951 | Enrico Platé | 4CLT/48 | Maserati 4CLT 1.5 L4s | P | (Switzerland) Toulo de Graffenried | | | | Ret | | Ret | | | |
| 1951 | Enrico Platé | 4CLT/48 | Maserati 4CLT 1.5 L4s | P | (West Germany) Paul Pietsch | | | | | | DNS | | | |
| 1951 | Scuderia Milano | 4CLT/50 | Speluzzi 1.5 L4s | P | (Argentina) Onofre Marimón | | | | Ret | | | | | |
| 1951 | Scuderia Milano | 4CLT/50 | Speluzzi 1.5 L4s | P | (Spain) Paco Godia | | | | | | | | 10 | |
| 1951 | Scuderia Milano | 4CLT/50 | Speluzzi 1.5 L4s | P | (Spain) Juan Jover | | | | | | | | DNS | |
| 1951 | Scuderia Ambrosiana | 4CLT/48 | Maserati 4CLT 1.5 L4s | D | (United Kingdom) David Murray | | | | | Ret | DNS | | | |
| 1951 | John James | 4CLT/48 | Maserati 4CLT 1.5 L4s | D | (United Kingdom) John James | | | | | Ret | | | | |
| 1951 | Philip Fotheringham-Parker | 4CL | Maserati 4CL 1.5 L4s | D | (United Kingdom) Philip Fotheringham-Parker | | | | | Ret | | | | |
| 1951 | Antonio Branca | 4CLT/48 | Maserati 4CLT 1.5 L4s | P | (Switzerland) Toni Branca | | | | | | Ret | | | |
| 1951 | Prince Bira | 4CLT/48 | OSCA 4500 4.5 V12 | P | (Thailand) B. Bira | | | | | | | | Ret | |
| 1952 | Enrico Platé | 4CLT/48 | Platé 2.0 L4 | P | | SUI | 500 | BEL | FRA | GBR | GER | NED | ITA | |
| 1952 | Enrico Platé | 4CLT/48 | Platé 2.0 L4 | P | (Switzerland) Toulo de Graffenried | 6 | | | Ret^{1} | 19 | | | DNQ | |
| 1952 | Enrico Platé | 4CLT/48 | Platé 2.0 L4 | P | (United States) Harry Schell | Ret | | | Ret^{1} | 17 | | | | |
| 1952 | Enrico Platé | 4CLT/48 | Platé 2.0 L4 | P | (Argentina) Alberto Crespo | | | | | | | | DNQ | |
| 1952 | Fadely-Anderson/R.A. Cott | 4CLT/48 | Offenhauser 4.5 L4 | F | (United States) Carl Forberg | | DNQ | | | | | | | |
| 1953 | Fadely-Anderson/R.A. Cott | 4CLT/48 | Offenhauser 4.5 L4 | F | | ARG | 500 | NED | BEL | FRA | GBR | GER | SUI | ITA |
| 1953 | Fadely-Anderson/R.A. Cott | 4CLT/48 | Offenhauser 4.5 L4 | F | (United States) Spider Webb | | DNQ | | | | | | | |
| 1957 | Morgan Engineering | 4CLT/48 | Maserati 4CLT 1.5 L4s | F | | ARG | MON | 500 | FRA | GBR | GER | PES | ITA | |
| 1957 | Morgan Engineering | 4CLT/48 | Maserati 4CLT 1.5 L4s | F | (United States) Danny Kladis | | | DNQ | | | | | | |

Notes

- ^1 – Indicates shared drive
