= Scuderia Milano =

Motor racing team

- Base: Italy
- Founder(s): Arialdo Ruggeri, Emilio Ruggeri
- Noted staff: Arnaldo Mazzucchelli
- Noted drivers: (Italy) Felice Bonetto (Argentina) Onofre Marimón (Thailand) Prince Bira

Formula One World Championship career
- First entry: 1950 Swiss Grand Prix
- Races entered: 6
- Constructors: Milano, Maserati
- Engines: Speluzzi 1.5 L4C (s/c), Maserati L4C (s/c) and L6, Milano L4C (s/c)
- Constructors' Championships: 0
- Drivers' Championships: 0
- Race victories: 0
- Podiums: 0
- Points: 2
- Pole positions: 0
- Fastest laps: 0
- Final entry: 1953 Italian Grand Prix

Scuderia Milano was an Italian Formula One motor racing team founded in Milan by Arialdo and Emilio Ruggeri, two brothers who had raced Maseratis in the early post-war period. The team scored two World Championship points on its debut, when Felice Bonetto finished fifth at the 1950 Swiss Grand Prix.

The team mostly raced modified Maserati 4CLT single-seaters with a shorter wheelbase, De Dion suspensions, and larger brakes. They had engines redesigned by Mario Speluzzi, refitted with two-stage superchargers, and raced them in the 1950 and 1951 F1 seasons. One Scuderia Milano original chassis, the 4CLT, was entered in the 1950 Italian Grand Prix with Bonetto at the wheel. He managed to qualify 23rd, three places ahead of his teammate Franco Comotti in a Maserati, but failed to start. The car was later purchased and modified by Scuderia Arzani-Volpini in 1955.

== Complete World Championship results ==
(key)

Year	Chassis	Engine	Tyres	Drivers	1	2	3	4	5	6	7	8	9	Points	WCC
1950			P		GBR	MON	500	SUI	BEL	FRA	ITA			2	-*
1950	Milano 1	Speluzzi 1.5 L4C (s/c)	P	(Italy) Felice Bonetto							DNS			2	-*
1950	Maserati 4CLT/50	Maserati 1.5 L4C (s/c)	P	(Italy) Felice Bonetto				5						2	-*
1950	Maserati 4CLT/50	Milano 1.5 L4C (s/c)	P	(Italy) Felice Bonetto						Ret				2	-*
1950	Maserati 4CLT/50	Milano 1.5 L4C (s/c)	P	(Italy) Franco Comotti							Ret			2	-*
1951			P		SUI	500	BEL	FRA	GBR	GER	ITA	ESP		0	-*
1951	Maserati 4CLT/50	Milano 1.5 L4C (s/c)	P	(Argentina) Onofre Marimón				Ret						0	-*
1951	Maserati 4CLT/48	Maserati 1.5 L4C (s/c)	P	(Spain) Paco Godia								10		0	-*
1951	Maserati 4CLT/48	Maserati 1.5 L4C (s/c)	P	(Spain) Juan Jover								DNS		0	-*
1953	Maserati A6GCM	Maserati 2.0 L6	P		ARG	500	NED	BEL	FRA	GBR	GER	SUI	ITA	0	-*
1953	Maserati A6GCM	Maserati 2.0 L6	P	(Brazil) Chico Landi									Ret	0	-*
1953	Maserati A6GCM	Maserati 2.0 L6	P	(Thailand) Prince Bira									11	0	-*

* Constructor's Championship not awarded until 1958.
