= Nuvolari =

Nuvolari may refer to:

- Nuvolari (TV channel)
- Audi Nuvolari quattro, a concept car
- EAM Nuvolari S1, a limited production car
- Gran Premio Nuvolari, an automobile race
- Tazio Nuvolari (1892–1953), Italian motorcycle and racing driver
- Nuvolari (surname), name list
