= Nuvolari (surname) =

Nuvolari is a surname. Notable people with the surname include:

- Arturo Nuvolari (1863–1938), Italian racing cyclist
- Giuseppe Nuvolari (1871–1962), Italian racing cyclist
- Tazio Nuvolari (1892–1953), Italian racing driver
