= Edelsbrunner Automobile München =

Bavarian car company based in Germany

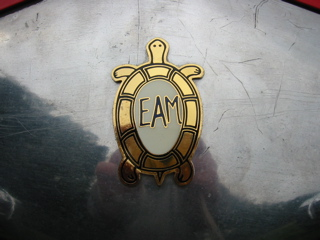
- Industry: Automotive
- Headquarters: Munich, Germany

Edelsbrunner Automobile München (EAM) was a small Bavarian car company based in Munich, Germany.

== History ==
At the beginning of 1990, the company began producing a small series of two cars in the style of the 1930s. Inspired by legendary Italian racing driver, Tazio Nuvolari, the company named their first car model the EAM Nuvolari S1. The Nuvolari S1 was formally presented and introduced to the public in the presence of Tazio himself, along with his family members; however, the German classic car market was small at the time and these cars were not successful. Although EAM took inspiration from Nuvolari for the S1, the car's design is very much British and loosely based on the 1934 Riley MPH. Their first model, in Green, was exhibited at the Munchen or Frankfurt Motor show.

== Models ==
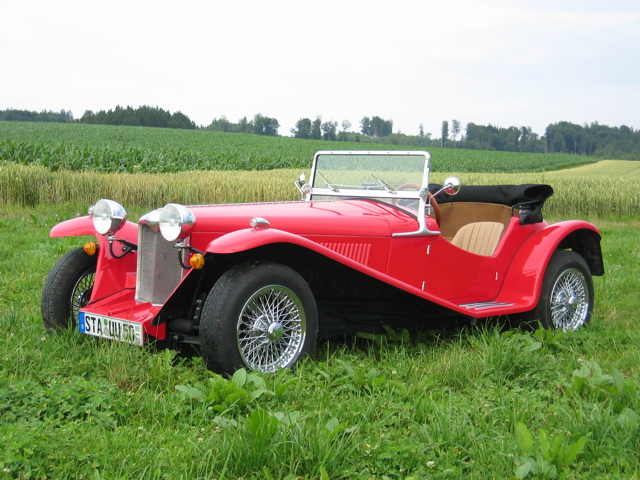
EAM Nuvolari S1

There were two models designed:

- EAM Nuvolari S1
- EAM Nuvolari R1

The Nuvolari S1 was only produced in small numbers and the R1 model did not get beyond a prototype.
