= Edelsbrunner =

Edelsbrunner is a surname. Notable people with the surname include:

- Herbert Edelsbrunner (born 1958), Austrian-American computer scientist
- Founder of Edelsbrunner Automobile München
