= Alfa Romeo 8C =

- 1933 Alfa Romeo 8C 2300 Corto Spider by Zagato

Overview
- Manufacturer: Alfa Romeo
- Production: 1931–1939
- Assembly: Italy: Portello, Milan
- Designer: Vittorio Jano

Body and chassis
- Class: Luxury car, Sports car, Racing car
- Layout: FR layout

Powertrain
- Engine: 2.3 L 2336 cc I8; 2.6 L 2556 cc I8; 2.9 L 2905 cc I8 (road cars)

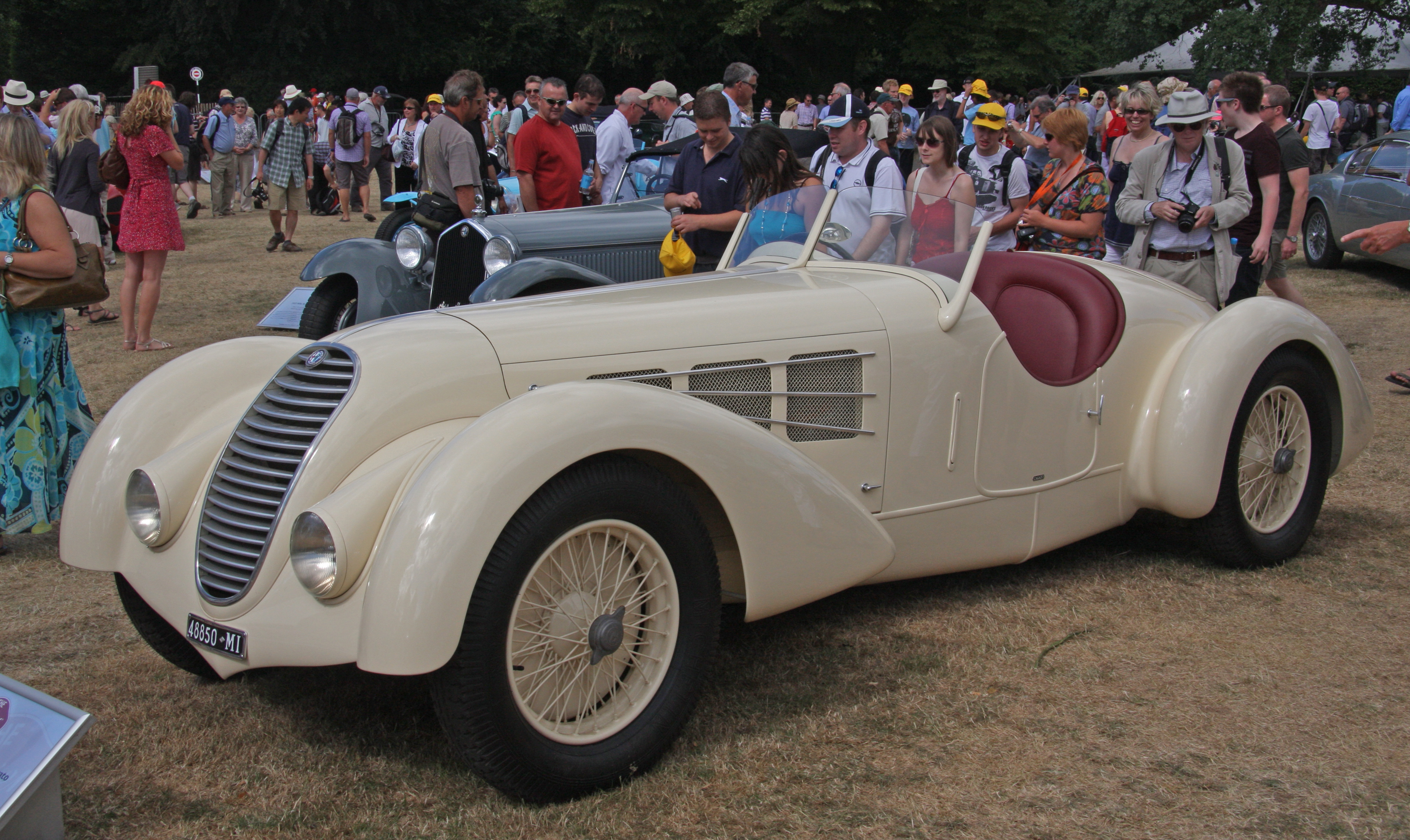
1934 Alfa Romeo 8C 2300 Spider Zagato

The Alfa Romeo 8C is a range of Alfa Romeo road, race and sports cars of the 1930s.

The 8C designates 8 cylinders, and originally a straight 8-cylinder engine. The Vittorio Jano designed 8C was Alfa Romeo's primary racing engine from its introduction in 1931 to its retirement in 1939. In addition to the two-seater sports cars it was used in the world's first genuine single-seat Grand Prix racing car, the Monoposto 'Tipo B' – P3 from 1932 onwards. In its later development it powered such vehicles as the twin-engined 1935 6.3-litre Bimotore, the 1935 3.8-litre Monoposto 8C 35 Type C, and the Alfa Romeo 8C 2900B Mille Miglia Roadster. It also powered top-of-the-range coach-built production models, including a Touring Spider and Touring Berlinetta.

In 2003 Alfa Romeo revived the 8C name for a V8-engined concept car. This eventually made it into production in 2007, as the 8C Competizione.

== History ==
In 1924, Vittorio Jano created his first straight-eight-cylinder engine for Alfa Romeo, the 1987 cc P2, with common crankcase and four plated-steel two-cylinder blocks, which won the first World Championship ever in 1925. Although it was a straight-8, the 8C designation was not used.

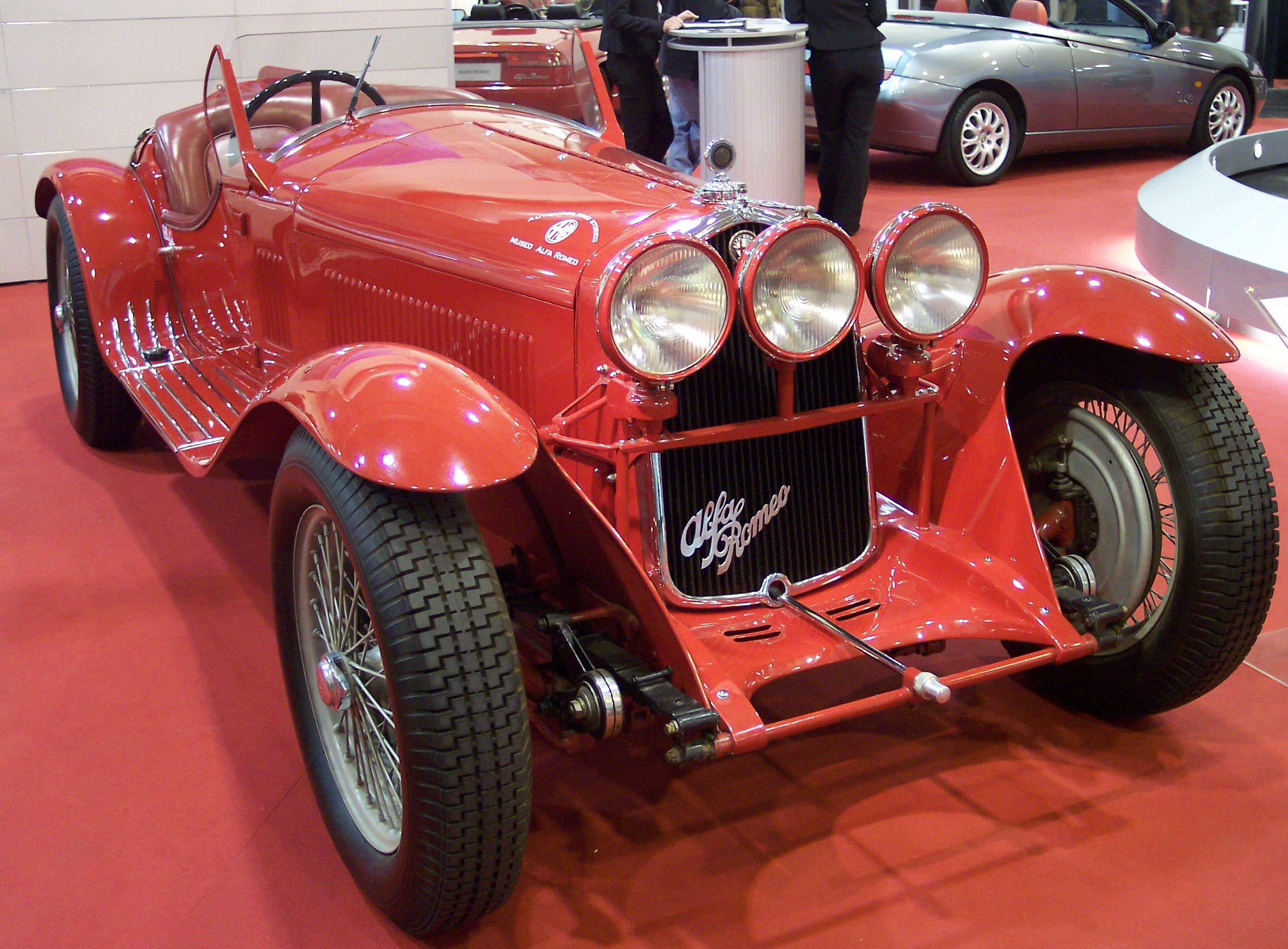
Alfa Romeo 8C 2300 Spider Corsa 1932

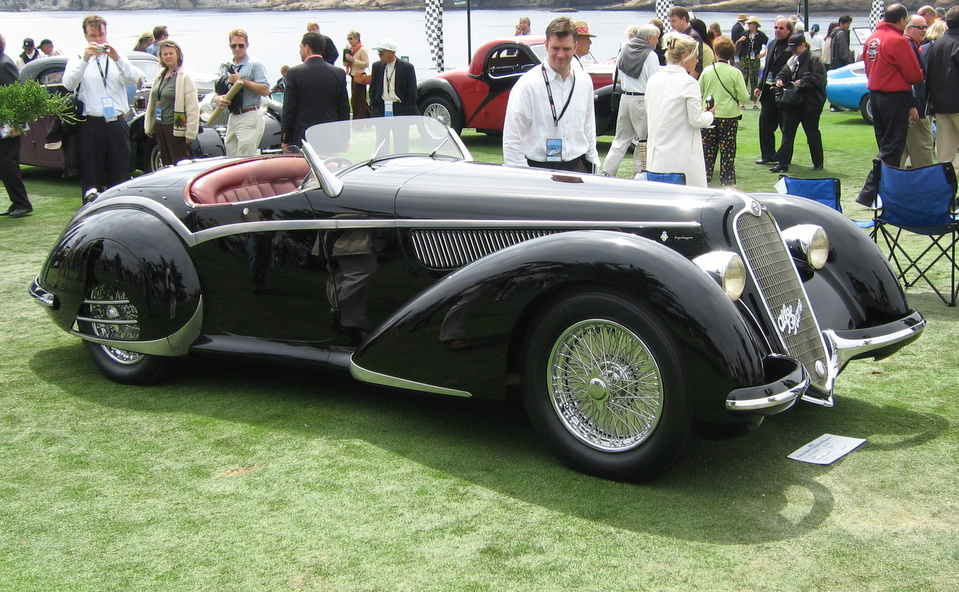
Alfa Romeo 8C 2900B Touring Spider 1937 at the 2005 Pebble Beach Concours d'Elegance.

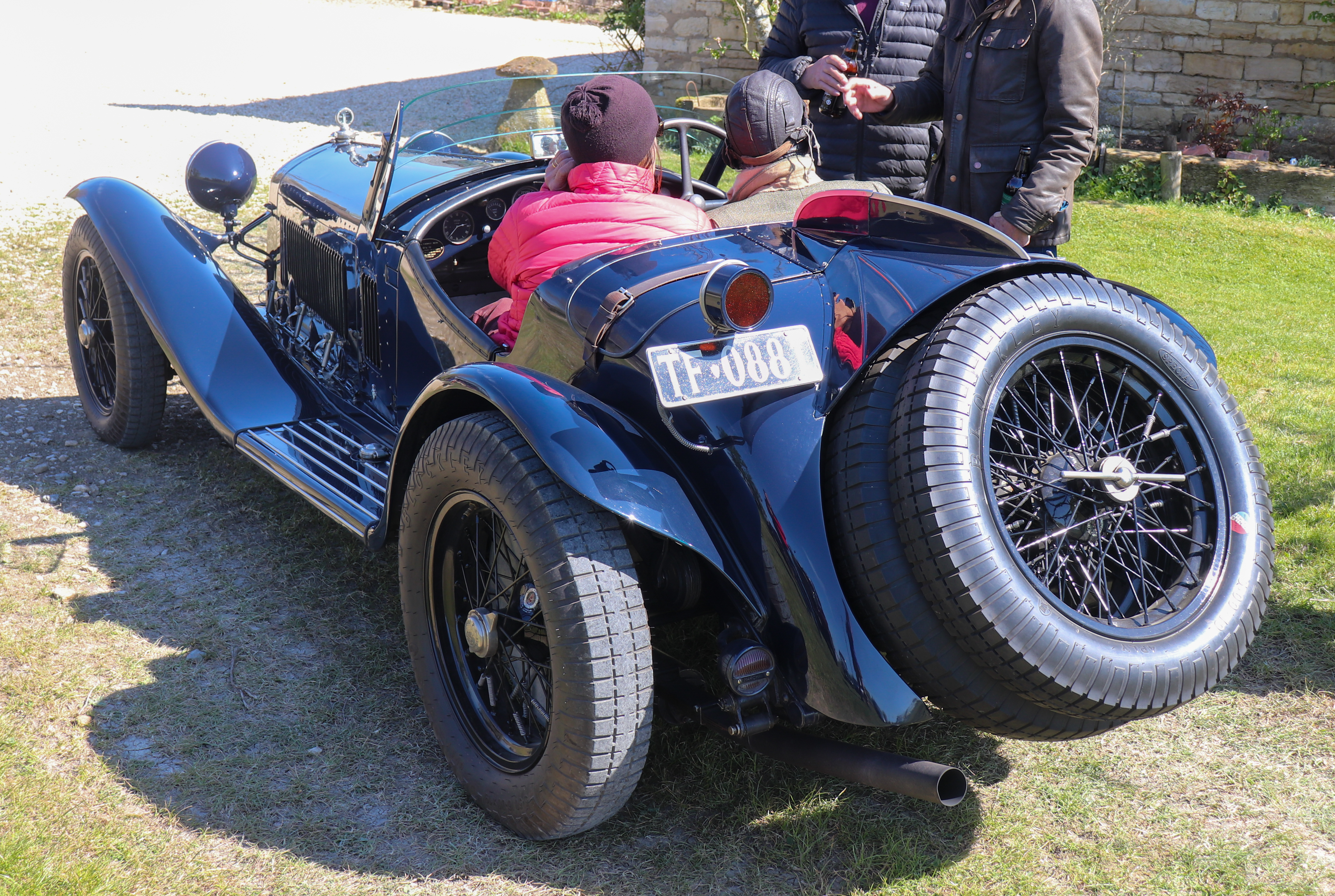
1933 8C Touring Spider rear

The 8C engine, first entered at the 1931 Mille Miglia road race through Italy, had a common crankcase, now with two alloy four-cylinder blocks, which also incorporated the heads. The bore and stroke (and hence rods, pistons and the like), were the same as the 6C 1750 (bore: 65 mm, stroke: 88 mm 2,336 cc). There was no separate head, and no head gasket to fail, but this made valve maintenance more difficult. A central gear tower drove the overhead camshafts, superchargers and ancillaries. As far as production cars are concerned, the 8C engine powered two models, the 8C 2300 (1931–1935) and the even more rare and expensive 8C 2900 (1936–1941), bore increased to 68 mm and stroke to 100 mm (2,905 cc).

At the same time, since racing cars were no longer required to carry a mechanic, Alfa Romeo built the first single seater race car. As a first attempt, the 1931 Monoposto Tipo A used a pair of 6-cylinder engines fitted side by side in the chassis. As the resulting car was too heavy and complex, Jano designed a more suitable and successful racer called Monoposto Tipo B (aka P3) for the 1932 Grand Prix season. The Tipo B proved itself the winning car of its era, winning straight from its first outing at the 1932 Italian Grand Prix, and was powered with an enlarged version of the 8C engine now at 2,665 cc, fed through a pair of superchargers instead of a single one.

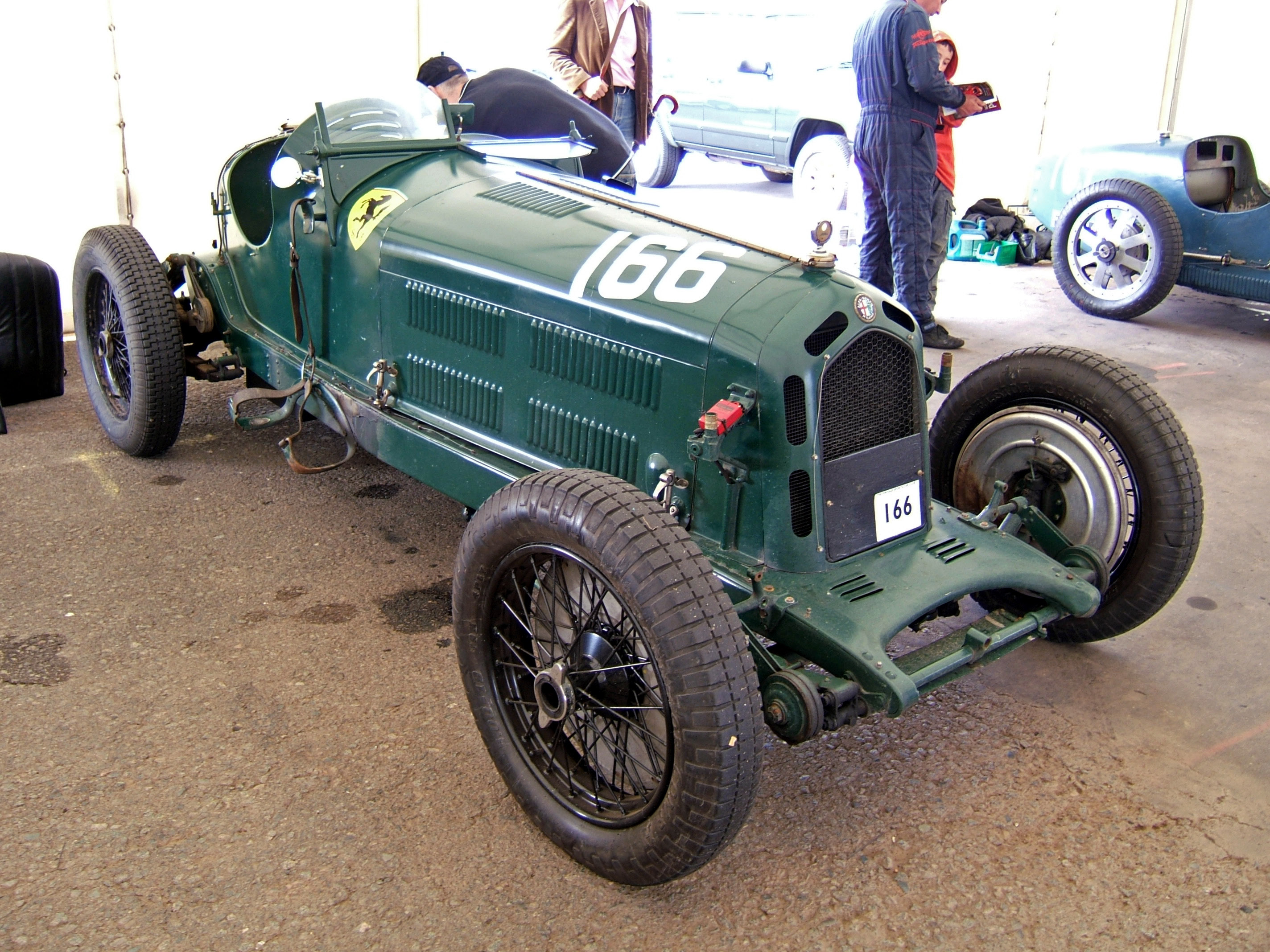
1933 ex-Scuderia Ferrari Alfa Romeo 8C 2600 Monza

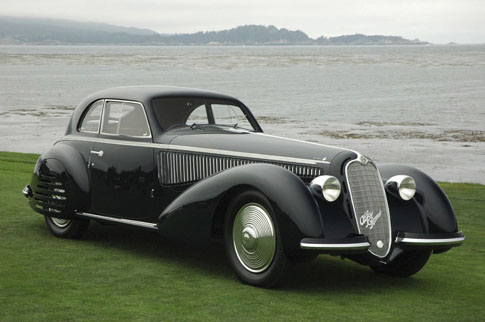
1938 Alfa Romeo 8C 2900B Touring Berlinetta, winner of the first race at Watkins Glen in 1948, Pebble Beach Concours d'Elegance "Best of Show" 2008 and Concorso d'Eleganza Villa d'Este "Best of Show" 2009.

Initially, Alfa Romeo announced that the 8C was not to be sold to private owners, but by autumn 1931 Alfa sold it as a rolling chassis in Lungo (long) or Corto (short) form with prices starting at over £1000. The chassis were fitted with bodies from a selection of Italian coach-builders (Carrozzeria) such as Zagato, Carrozzeria Touring, Carrozzeria Castagna, Carrozzeria Pinin Farina ( later Pininfarina ) and Brianza, even though Alfa Romeo did make bodies. Some chassis were clothed by coach-builders such as Graber, Worblaufen and Tuscher of Switzerland and Figoni of France. Alfa Romeo also had a practice of rebodying cars for clients, and some racing vehicles were sold rebodied as road vehicles. Some of the famous first owners include Baroness Maud Thyssen of the Thyssen family, the owner of the aircraft and now scooter company Piaggio Andrea Piaggio, Raymond Sommer, and Tazio Nuvolari.

== Models ==
=== 1931 8C 2300 ===
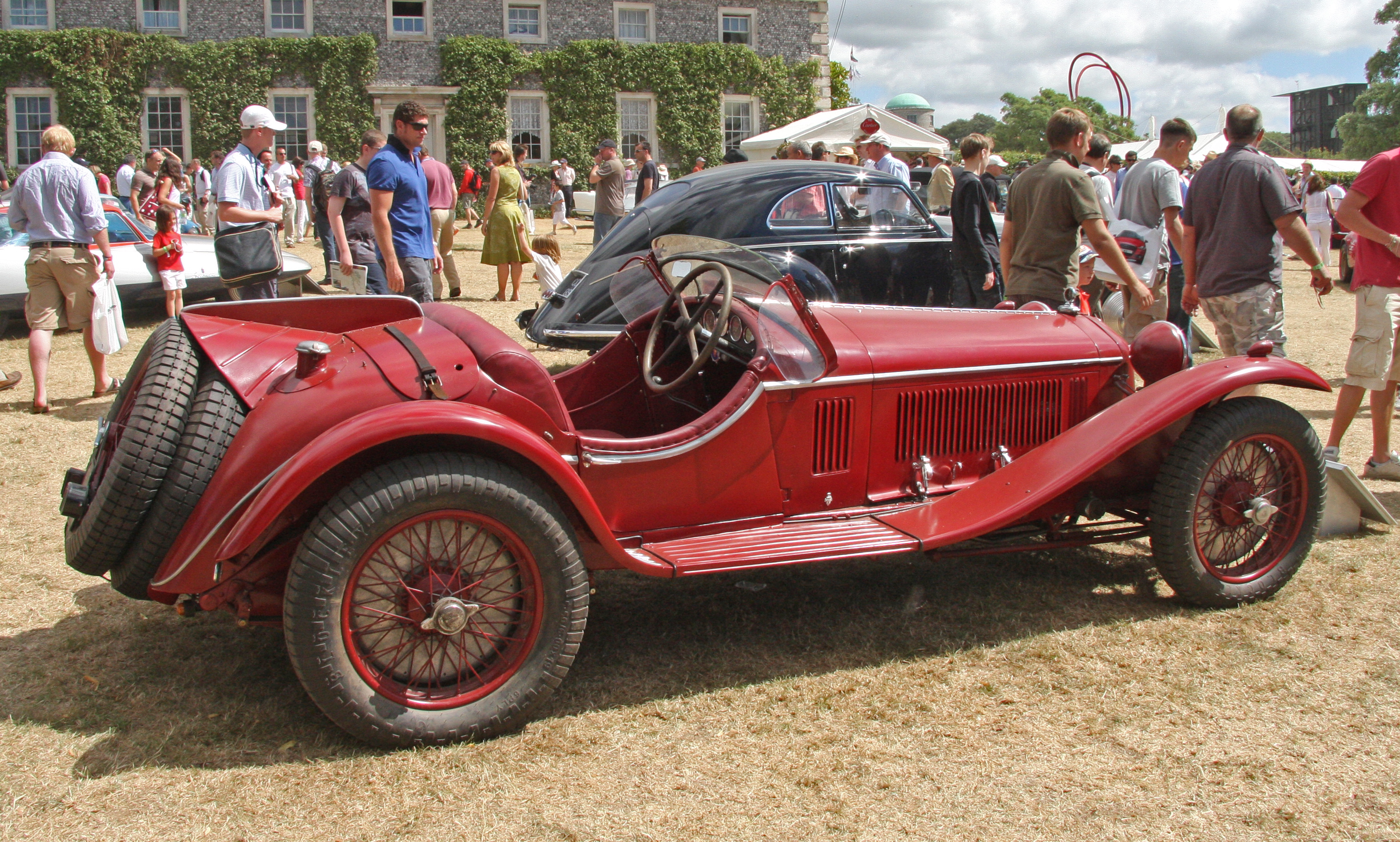
1931 Alfa Romeo 8C 2300 Touring Spider

The first model was the 1931 '8C 2300', a reference to the car's 2.3 L (bore: 65 mm, stroke: 88 mm, 2336 cc) engine, initially designed as a racing car, but actually produced in 188 units also for road use. While the racing version of the 8C 2300 Spider, driven by Tazio Nuvolari won the 1931 and 1932 Targa Florio race in Sicily, the 1931 Italian Grand Prix victory at Monza gave the "Monza" name to the twin seater GP car, a shortened version of the Spider. The Alfa Romeo factory often added the name of events won to the name of a car.

Year	1931	1932	1933	1934	Sum
8C 2300 corto et lungo	24	68	89	7	188
Sum	24	68	89	7	188
corto et lungo = short and long

=== 1931 8C 2300 Le Mans type ===
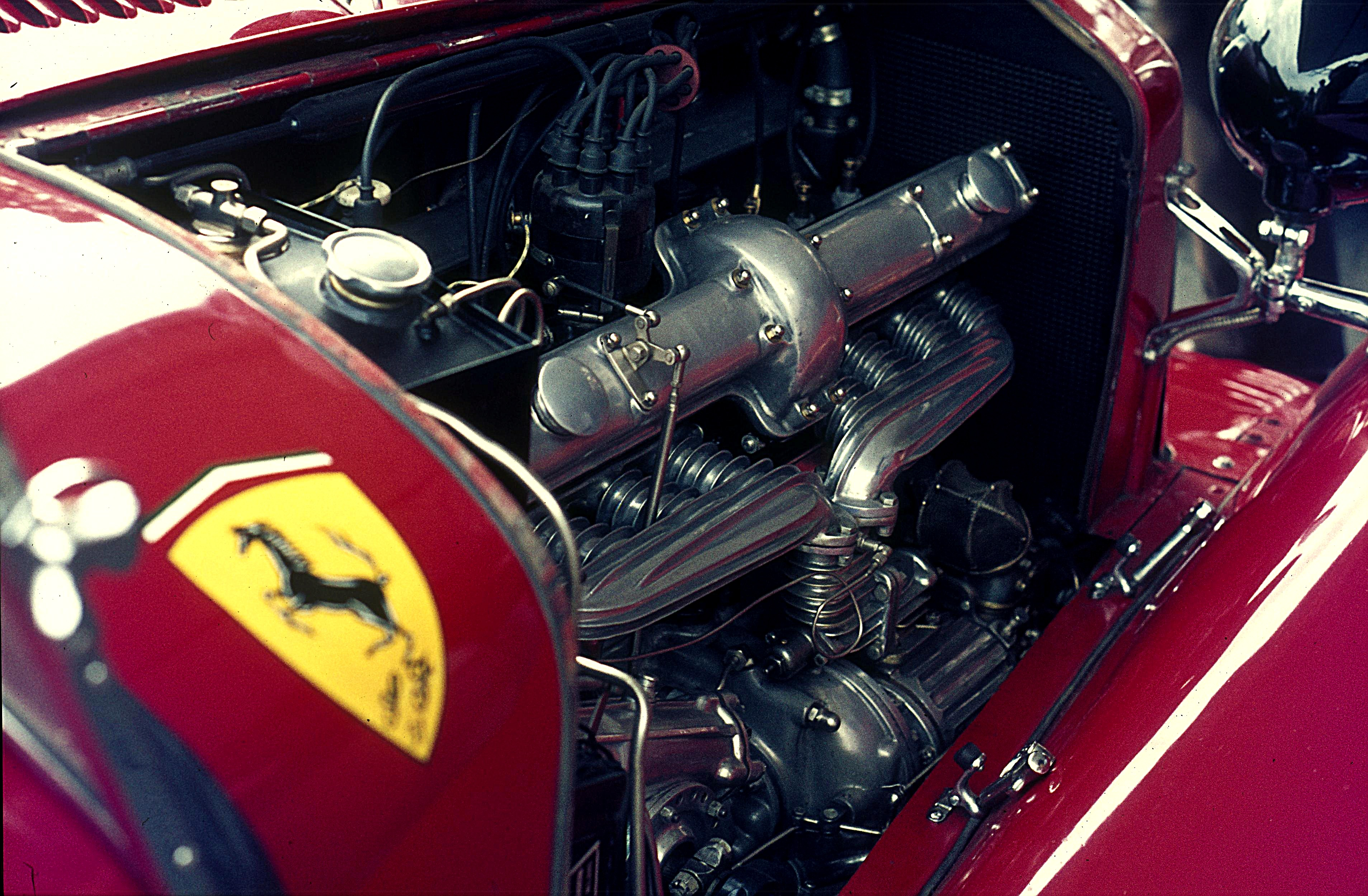
2300 engine with Roots supercharger.

'8C 2300 tipo Le Mans' was the sport version of the '8C 2300' and it had a successful debut in the 1931 Eireann Cup driven by Henry Birkin. It won the 24 Hours of Le Mans in 1931 (Howe-Birkin); 1932 (Chinetti-Sommer); 1933 (Nuvolari-Sommer) and 1934 (Chinetti-Etancelin).

The 8C 2300 Le Mans model on display at the Museo Alfa Romeo was bought by Sir Henry Birkin in 1931 for competition use, but it is not the car in which Birkin and Howe won the 1931 Le Mans 24 hours.

A 1933 8C 2300 Le Mans, chassis #2311201, is part of the permanent collection at the Simeone Foundation Automotive Museum in Philadelphia, PA, US. The car was owned by Lord Howe who campaigned it in the 24 Hours of Le Mans in 1934 (DNF) as well as in 1935 when it set the fastest lap before retiring.

=== 1933 8C 2600 ===
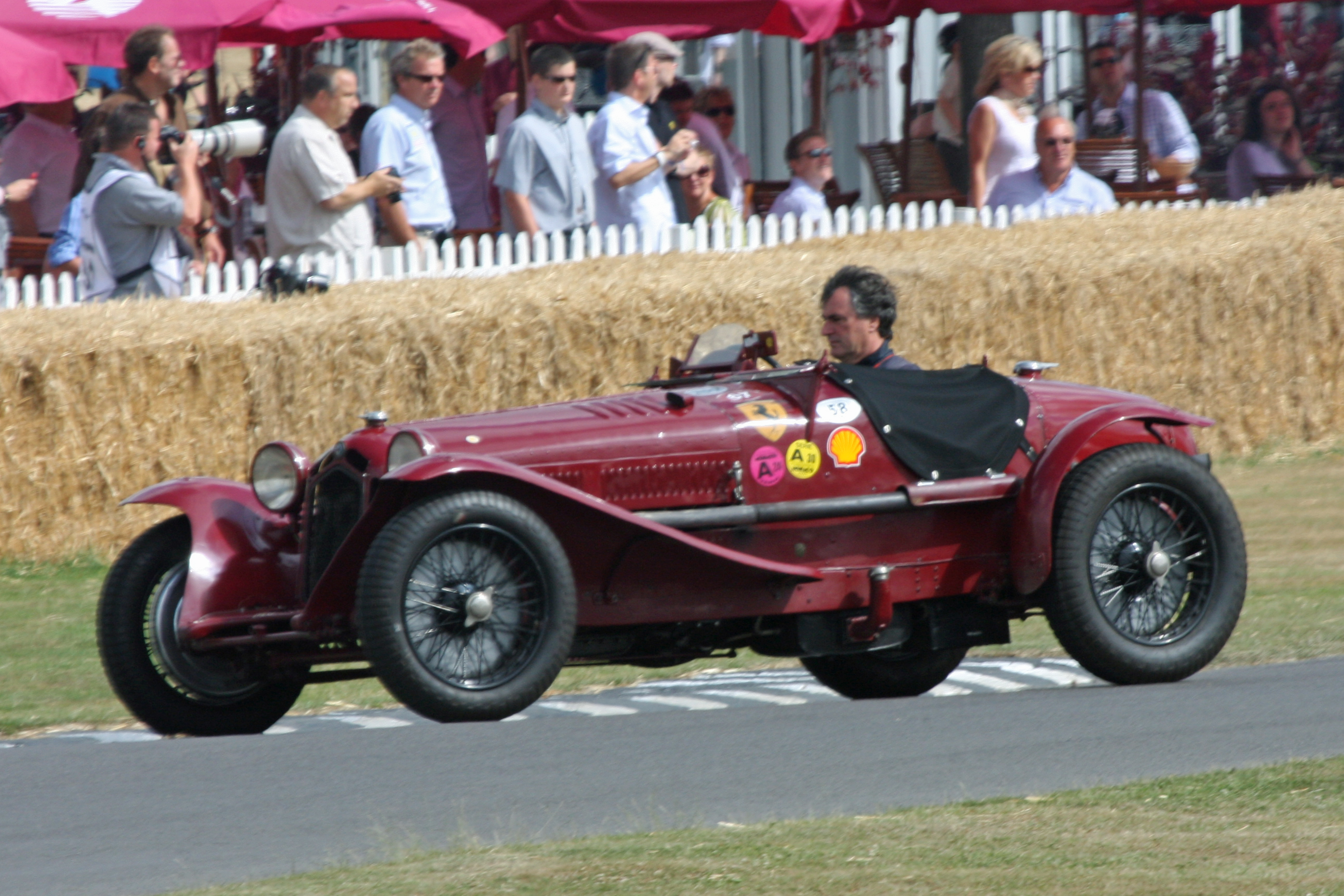
1933 Alfa Romeo 8C 2600

In 1933 the supercharged dual overhead cam straight-8 engine, enlarged (bore: 68 mm, stroke: 88 mm, 2557 cc) to 2.6 litres ('8C 2600') for the Tipo B, was fitted to the Scuderia Ferrari 8C Monzas. Scuderia Ferrari had become the "semi-official" racing department of Alfa Romeo, who were no longer entering races as a factory effort due to the poor economic situation of the company. With the initial 215 hp of the 2.6 engine, the Monoposto Tipo B (P3) racer could accelerate to 60 mph (97 km/h) in less than 7 seconds and could eventually reach 135 mph (217 km/h). For 1934 the race engines became 2.9 litres.

Tazio Nuvolari won the 1935 German GP at the Nürburgring at the wheel of a 3.2 L Tipo B against the more powerful Silver Arrows from Mercedes-Benz and Auto Union.

=== 1935 Monoposto 8C 35 Type C ===
Alfa Romeo Monoposto Type C
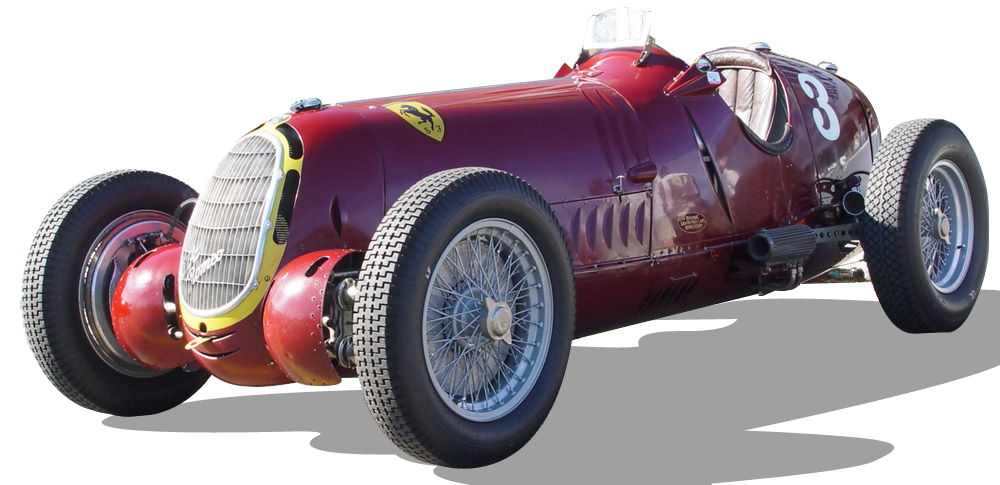
- Alfa Romeo 8C-35 Scuderia Ferrari

Overview
- Manufacturer: Alfa Romeo
- Also called: Alfa Romeo 8C 35
- Production: 1935–1939
- Assembly: Italy
- Designer: Vittorio Jano

Body and chassis
- Class: Racing car
- Body style: Monoposto (single seat) open wheeler
- Layout: Multi-plate clutch at engine, four-speed Stirnsi rear transaxle.
- Platform: Light gauge welded box-section frame with all independent suspension

Powertrain
- Engine: 3,822 cc (233.2 cu in) Supercharged straight eight twin overhead cam
- Transmission: Unsynchronised rear transaxle four-speed with reverse gear

Dimensions
- Wheelbase: 108.2 inches (2748.28 mm)
- Length: 169.3 inches (4300 mm) including starting handle
- Width: 34.0 inches (863.6 mm) cockpit
- Height: 48.0 inches (1219.2 mm) cowl 52.0 inches (1320.8 mm) windscreen
- Curb weight: 1646 lb (746.613 kg) unladen

Chronology
- Predecessor: Alfa Romeo Monoposto 8C Type B
- Successor: Alfa Romeo Monoposto 12C 37

Eight 3.8-litre versions, sharing no castings with the earlier blocks, were individually built for racing in five months, most being used in the Alfa Romeo Monoposto 8C 35 Type C, as raced by Scuderia Ferrari. (The P3 designation was dropped.) The 3,822 cc (233.2 cu in) capacity 78 mm × 100 mm (3.07 in × 3.94 in) produced 330 bhp (246 kW) at 5500 rpm, and had 320 lb⋅ft (434 N⋅m) from 900 rpm to 5500 rpm. It had 15.5-inch drum brakes all round, using Pirelli 5.25 or 5.50 x 19 tyres at the front and 7.00 or 7.50 x 19 tyres at the rear. Though not a match for the big Mercedes and Auto Union on the faster circuits, they came into their own on the tighter circuits and races. In 1936 Tipo Cs fitted with the troublesome V12 did not live up to expectations, and the 3.8 continued to be used. From 1933 Scuderia Ferrari had managed the racing, and the Ferrari prancing horse appeared on the flanks of the Bimotore, but Alfa Corse began to become more active, and Vittorio Jano went at the end of the 1937 season. In 1938 four Alfa Romeo Tipo 308 racers were built for the three-litre class using 8C engines.

On September 14, 2013, a former Scuderia Ferrari 8C 35, in which Tazio Nuvolari had won the 1936 Coppa Ciano, was sold for £5.9 million; a new world record price for any Alfa Romeo. It was sold by the Bonhams auction house in its Goodwood Revival Meeting Sale in England. The car in question was the ex-Hans Ruesch, ex-Dennis Poore car, which had been one of the early stars of racing at the Goodwood Motor Circuit 1948–55.

=== 1935 Bimotore ===
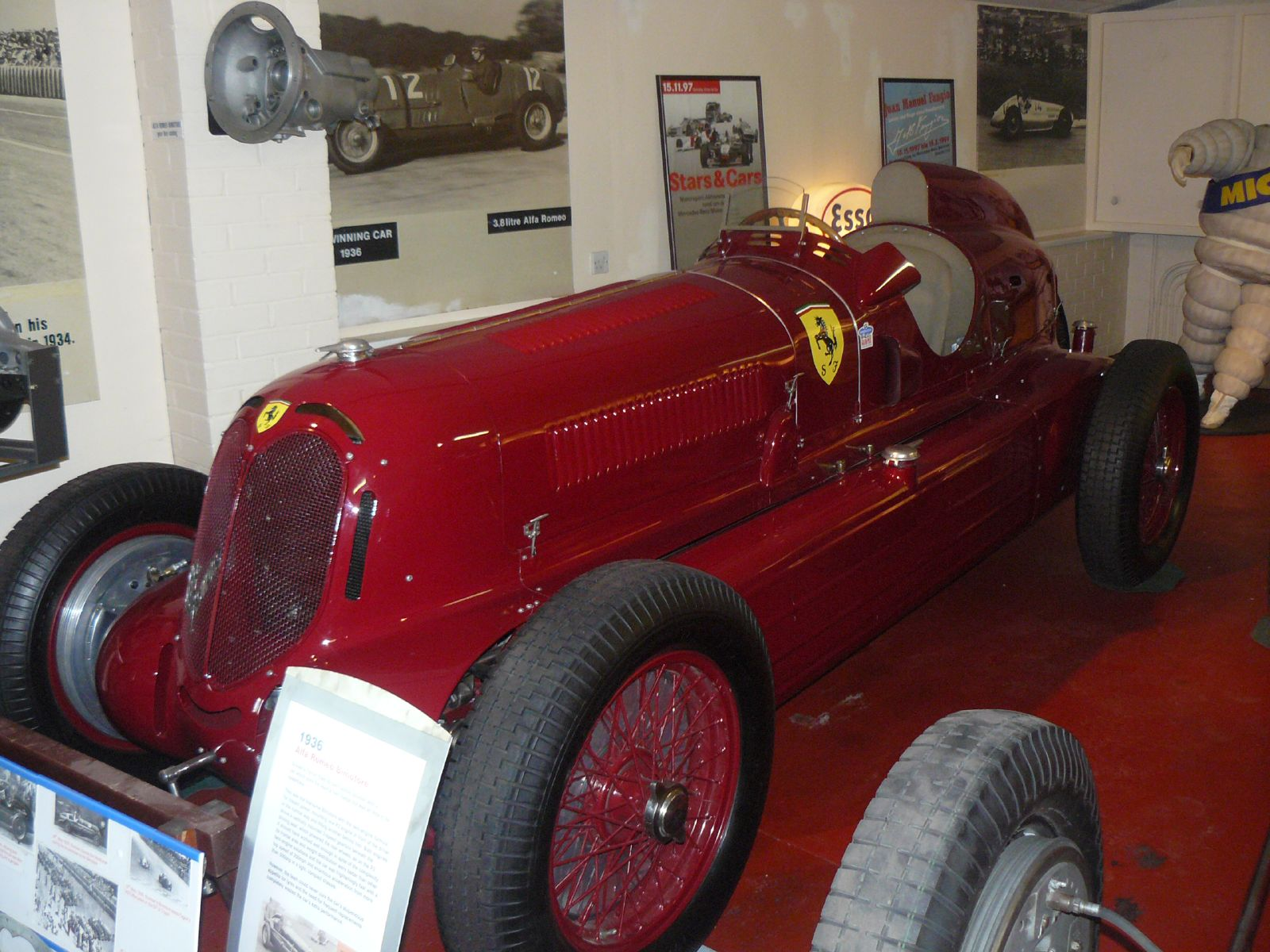
1935 Alfa Romeo Bimotore Scuderia Ferrari

In 1935, to compete with Mercedes Benz and Auto Union, Enzo Ferrari (Race team manager) and Luigi Bazzi (Designer) built a racer with two 3.2-litre (bore: 71 mm, stroke: 100 mm, 3167.4 cc) engines, one in the front and one in the rear, giving 6.3 litres and 540 bhp (403 kW). The drivetrain layout was unusual. The two engines were connected by separate driveshaft to a gearbox with two input shafts, and two angled output shafts, so each of the rear wheels had its own driveshaft. It could never quite succeed against the Mercedes W25 B of Rudolf Caracciola, the car handed very badly because of uneven weight distribution, thanks to one of the engines being behind the driver, and was hard on fuel and tyres. The gain in speed was offset by increased pit times. On May 12, 1935, two were entered in the Tripoli Grand Prix driven by Nuvolari and Chiron who finished fourth and fifth. Chiron managed a second at the following 1935 Avus race.

On June 16, 1935, Nuvolari drove a specially prepared Bimotore from Florence to Livorno and set a new speed record 364 km/h (226 mph) with an average speed of over 323 km/h (201 mph). After that it was sidelined in favour of the Tipo C. It was the first racer to use the Dubonnet independent trailing arm front suspension. The V12 was under development, but was not race ready. It was noticed that the Bimotore had a traction advantage on rough ground, so a version of the Bimotore chassis with the independent Dubonnet front end, and a new independent rear with swing axles with radius rods and a transverse leaf spring was used for the Tipo C 3.8s.

=== 8C 2900 ===
Alfa Romeo 8C 2900
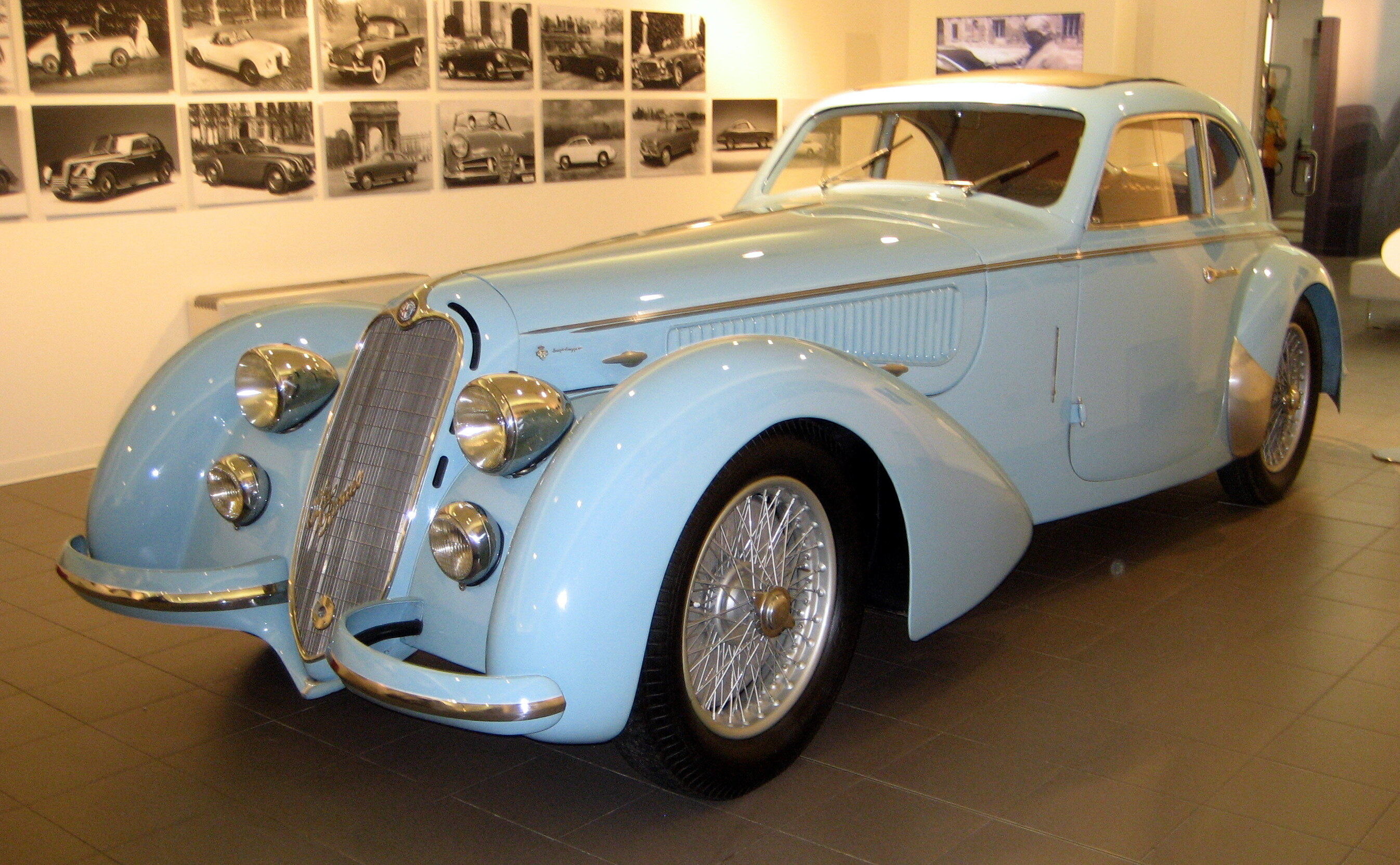
- 1938 Alfa Romeo 8C 2900 B Lungo with Carrozzeria Touring Superleggera body

Overview
- Manufacturer: Alfa Romeo
- Production: 1935–1938
- Assembly: Italy

Body and chassis
- Class: Sports car/Racing car
- Body style: 2-seat roadster 2-seat coupe
- Layout: Engine-mounted multi-plate clutch, rear transaxle.
- Platform: Light gauge welded box-section frame with all independent suspension
- Related: Alfa Romeo 8C 35

Powertrain
- Engine: Supercharged 2,905 cc (177.3 cu in) DOHC straight-eight engine
- Transmission: Unsynchronised four-speed rear transaxle with reverse gear

Dimensions
- Wheelbase: 2900A: 2,718 mm (107.0 in); 2900B Corto: 2,799 mm (110.2 in); 2900B Lungo: 3,000 mm (118.1 in)

The 8C 2900 was designed to compete in sports car races in general and the Mille Miglia in particular. It used the 2.9 L (bore: 68 mm, stroke: 100 mm, 2905 cc) version of the 8C engine and was based on the 8C 35 Grand Prix racing chassis. As such, it had an inline 8-cylinder 2.9-litre engine using two Roots type superchargers fed by two updraught Weber carburettors and fully independent suspension with Dubonnet-type trailing arm suspension with coil springs and hydraulic dampers at front and swing axles with a transverse leaf spring at the rear.

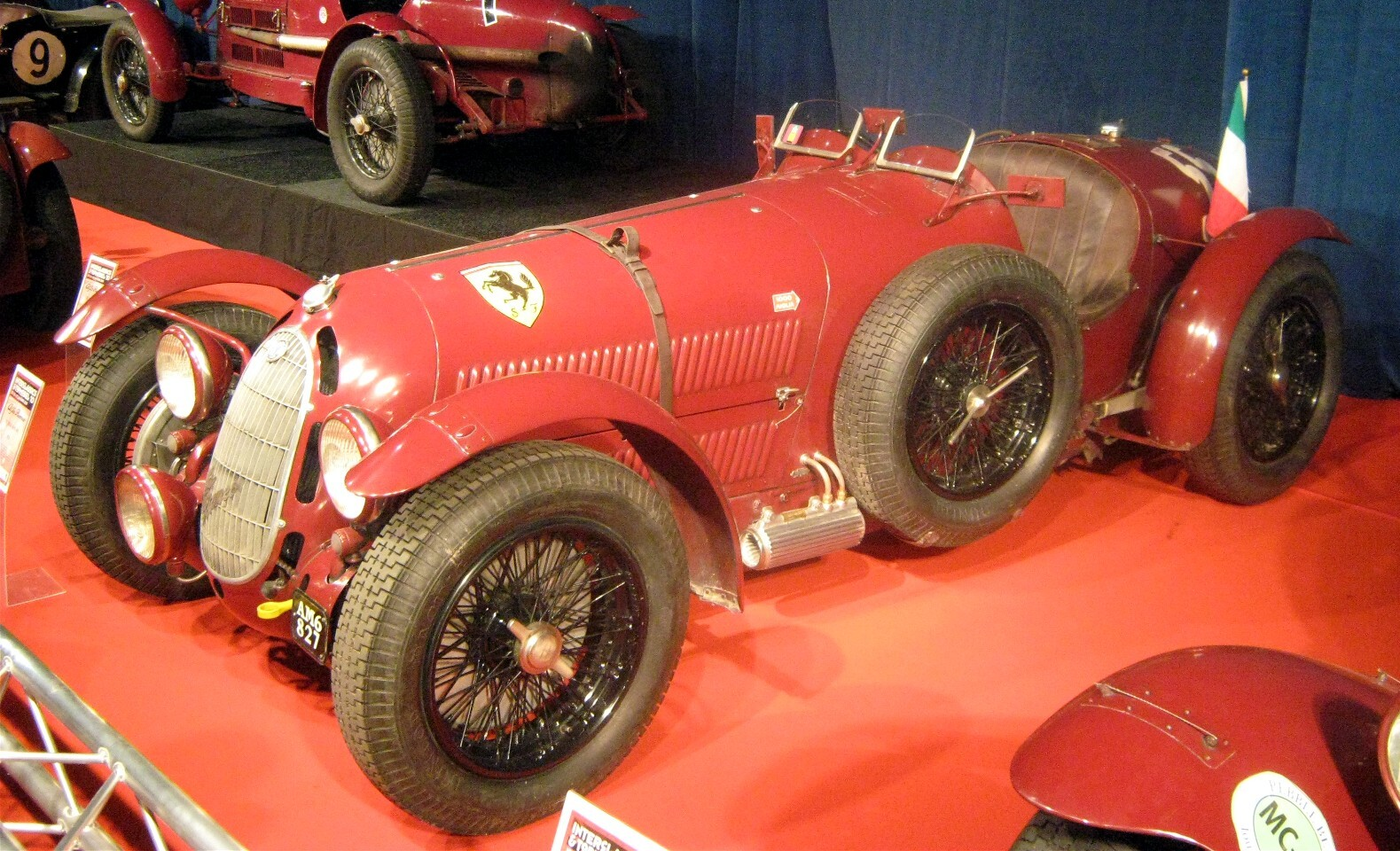
1936 Alfa Romeo 8C 2900A roadster.

The 8C 2900A was shown to the public at the 1935 London Motor Show and was advertised for sale there. The engine, with a compression ratio of 6.5:1 and a stated power output of 220 bhp (160 kW) at 5300 rpm, was detuned from the Grand Prix racing version. Ten 2900As were built, five in 1935 and five in 1936.

Scuderia Ferrari entered three 8C 2900As in the 1936 Mille Miglia and again in the 1937 Mille Miglia. In 1936 they finished in the top three positions, with Marquis Antonio Brivio winning, Giuseppe Farina finishing second, and Carlo Pintacuda finishing third. In 1937 they finished in the top two positions, with Pintacuda winning and Farina finishing second; the third 2900A, driven by Clemente Biondetti, did not finish. The 8C 2900A also won the 1936 Spa 24 Hours with Raymond Sommer and Francesco Severi.

The 8C 2900B began production in 1937. The 2900B design made some concessions to comfort and reliability. The engine was detuned further, having a compression ratio of 5.75:1 and a stated power output of 180 bhp (134 kW) at 5200 rpm. The 2900B chassis was available in two wheelbases: the Corto (short) at 2,799 mm (110.2 in), which was longer than the 2900A's 2,718 mm (107.0 in) wheelbase, and the Lungo (long) at 3,000 mm (118.1 in). The wheels of the 2900B had 19-inch rims fitted with 17-inch (432 mm) hydraulic drum brakes. Thirty-two 2900Bs were built in regular production, ten in 1937, and twenty-two in 1938. Another 2900B was assembled from parts in 1941. Most of these cars were bodied by Carrozzeria Touring, although a few were bodied by Pininfarina

Year	1937	1938	Sum
8C 2900B corto et lungo	10	20	30
Sum	10	20	30
corto et lungo = short and long

An 8C 2900 with Pininfarina cabriolet bodywork was auctioned for US$4,072,000 by Christie's at Pebble Beach, California. This was the tenth highest price ever paid for a car at auction at the time.

==== 1938 8C 2900B Mille Miglia Roadster ====
Alfa Romeo 8C 2900B Mille Miglia Roadster
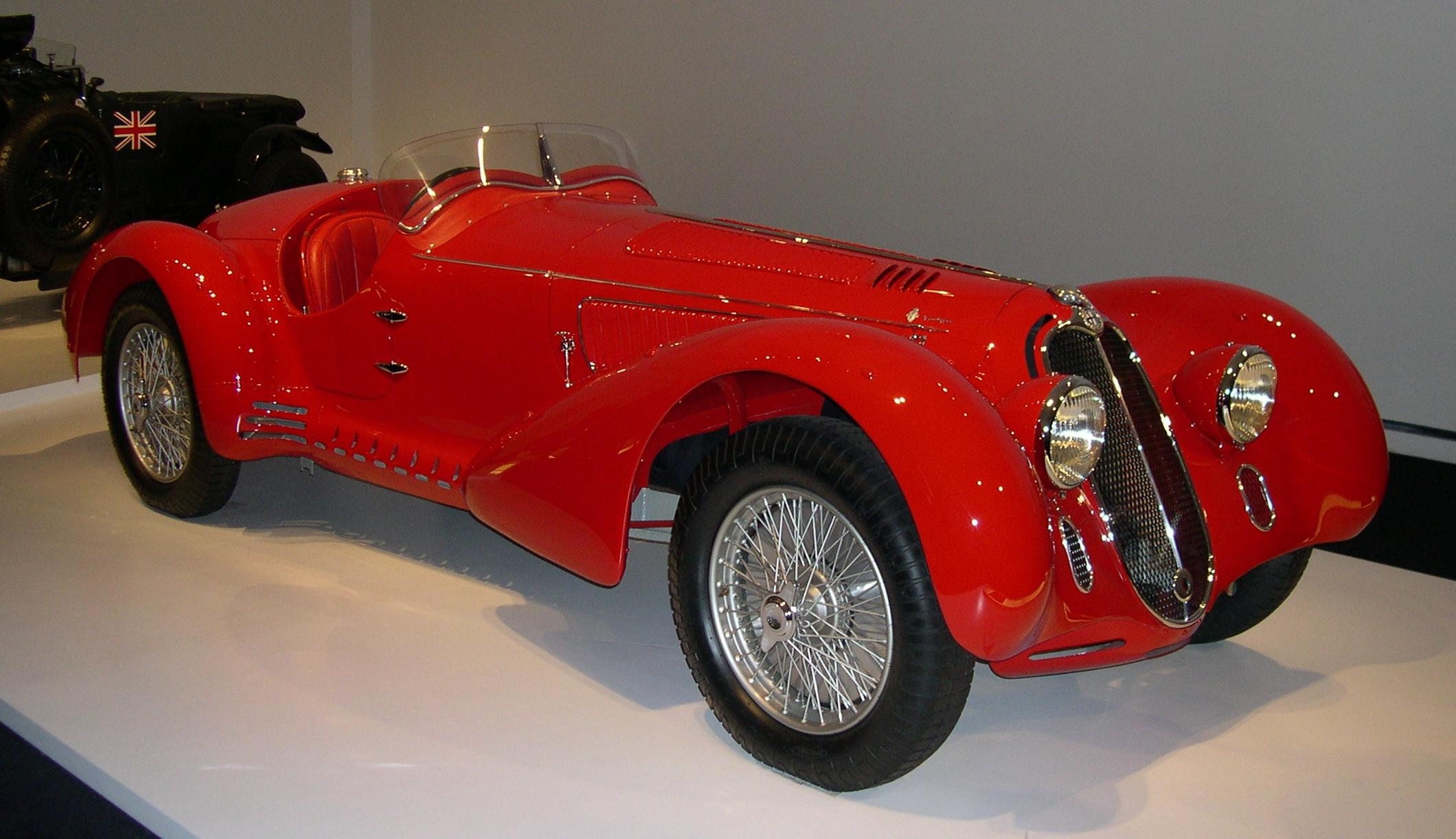
- 2nd place car in 1938 Mille Miglia, driven by Carlo Pintacuda.
- Category: Sports car racing
- Constructor: Alfa Romeo
- Designers: Engine: Vittorio Jano; Body: Carrozzeria Touring
- Predecessor: Alfa Romeo 8C 2900A

Technical specifications
- Chassis: Light gauge welded box-section frame
- Suspension (front): Trailing arms, coil springs, telescopic shock absorbers in oil-filled cylinders
- Suspension (rear): Swing axles located by radius arms and transverse leaf spring, telescopic shock absorbers
- Length: 176.4 in (448.1 cm)
- Height: 42.2 in (107.2 cm) at cowl, 48.0 in (121.9 cm) at windscreen
- Axle track: 53.1 in (134.9 cm) front and rear
- Wheelbase: 110.2 in (279.9 cm)
- Engine: Alfa Romeo 8C 2900 2,905 cc (177.3 cu in) Straight-8 Twin Roots superchargers front-mounted, behind rear axle
- Transmission: four-speed + reverse unsynchronised manual rear transaxle
- Weight: 1,250 kg (2,755.8 lb)
- Fuel: 38 US gal (144 L)
- Tyres: 5.5-inch (140 mm) Pirelli Corsa front and rear

Competition history
- Notable entrants: Alfa Corse
- Notable drivers: Clemente Biondetti; Carlo Maria Pintacuda; Giuseppe Farina; Eugenio Siena; Francesco Severi
- Debut: 1938 Mille Miglia

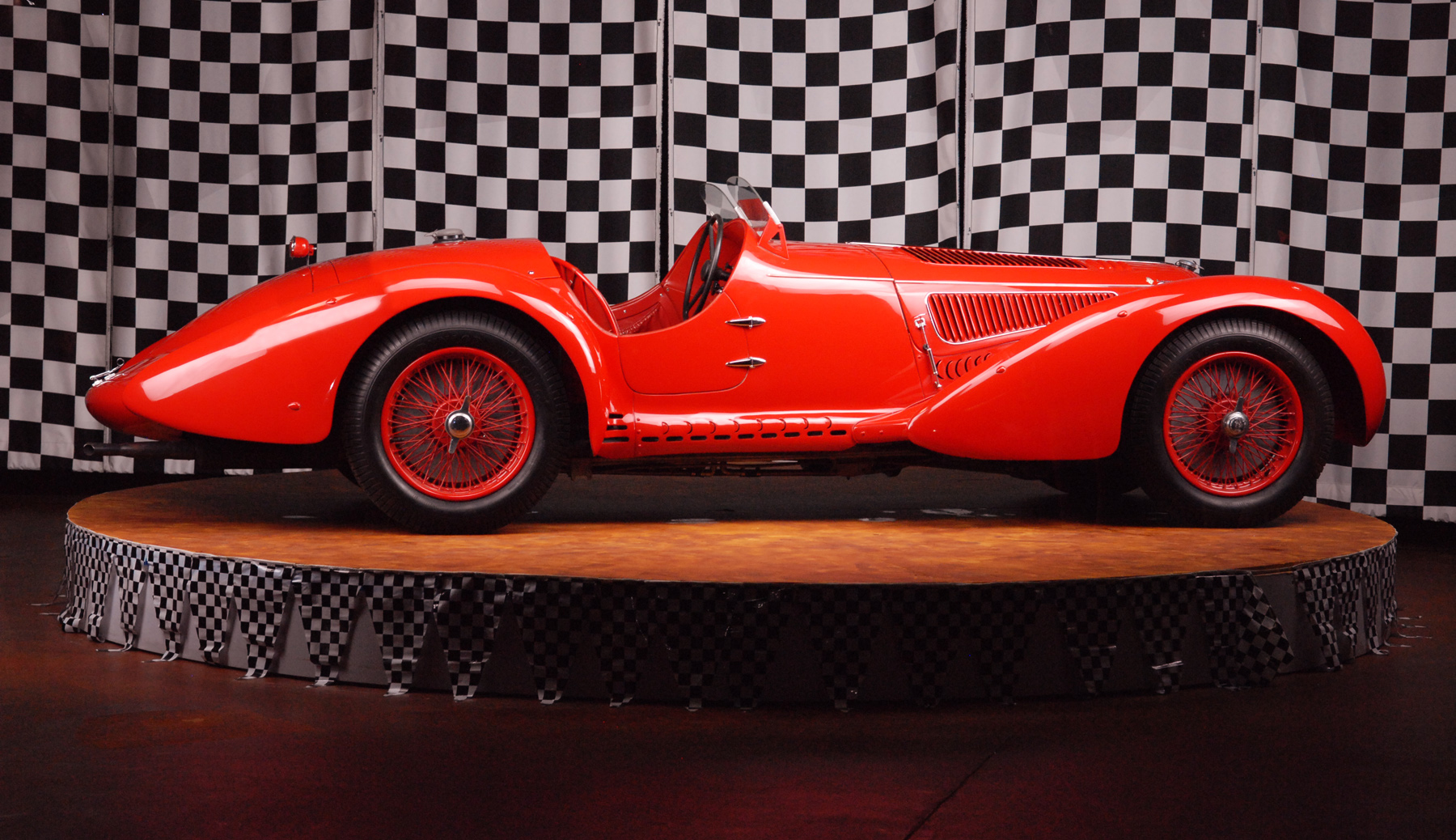
The Alfa Romeo 8C 2900B MM that won the 1938 Mille Miglia driven by Clemente Biondetti. Simeone Foundation Automotive Museum, Philadelphia, PA, USA

In 1938, Alfa Corse, an in-house racing team for Alfa Romeo, took over the activities of Scuderia Ferrari, along with many of their personnel, including Enzo Ferrari. Alfa Corse prepared four 8C 2900B Corto cars for the 1938 Mille Miglia. These used Carrozzeria Touring Superleggera roadster bodies. Three of these cars had their engines tuned to give 225 bhp (168 kW), while the fourth, assigned to Biondetti, had an engine from an Alfa Romeo Tipo 308 Grand Prix car, which delivered 295 bhp (220 kW) The cars finished in the top two positions, with Biondetti winning and Pintacuda finishing second after leading the race from Piacenza to Terni where his brakes locked up. The other two 8C 2900B Mille Miglia roadsters did not finish; Farina crashed and Eugenio Siena had a blown engine. Piero Dusio finished third in a privately entered 8C 2900A. One of the 2800B Mille Miglia roadsters later won the 1938 Spa 24 Hours with Pintacuda and Severi driving.

Phil Hill competed in several west coast United States races in Pintacuda's car in 1951 before driving for Ferrari.

==== 1938 8C 2900B Le Mans Speciale ====
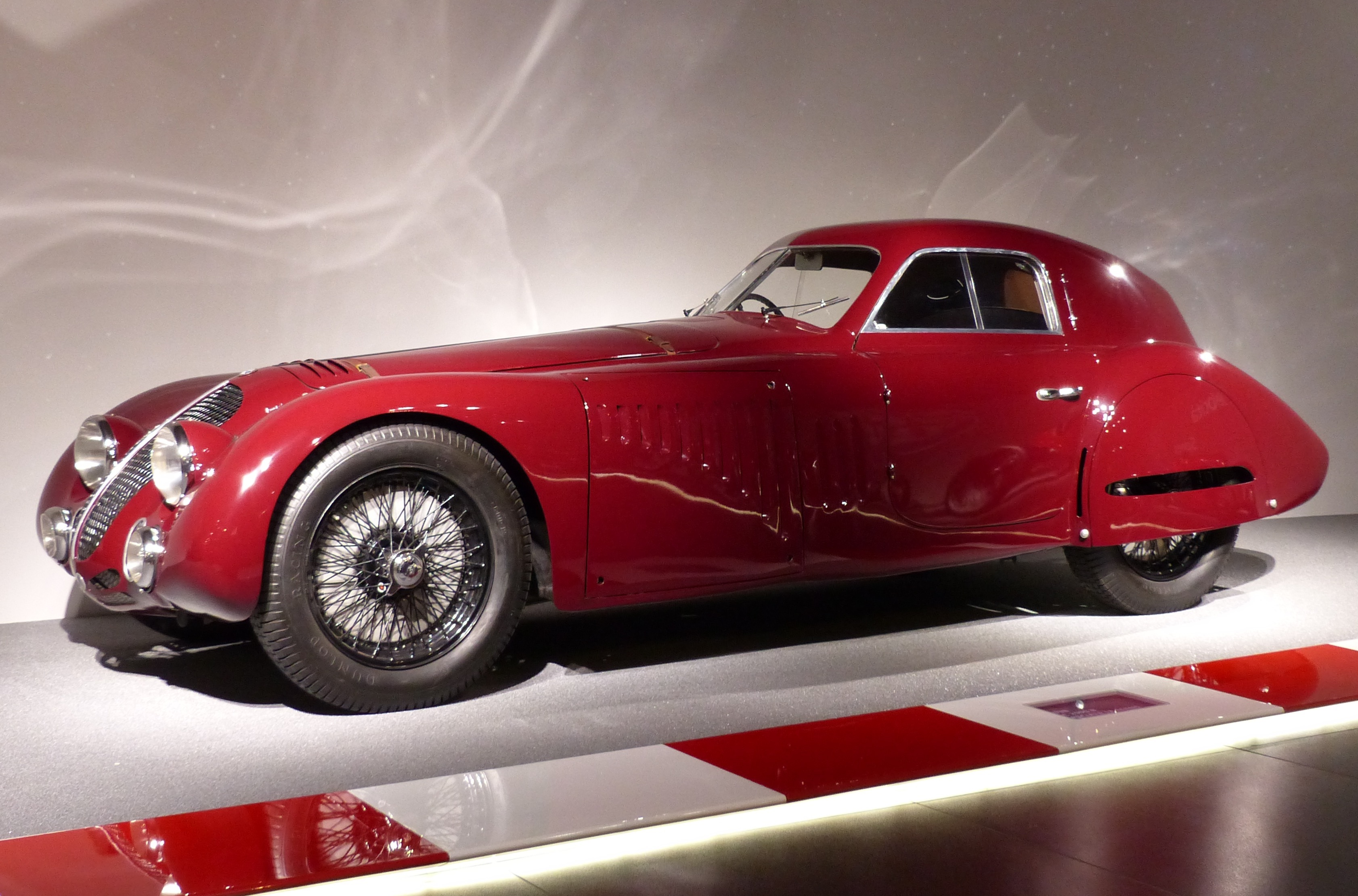
Alfa Romeo 8C 2900B Le Mans

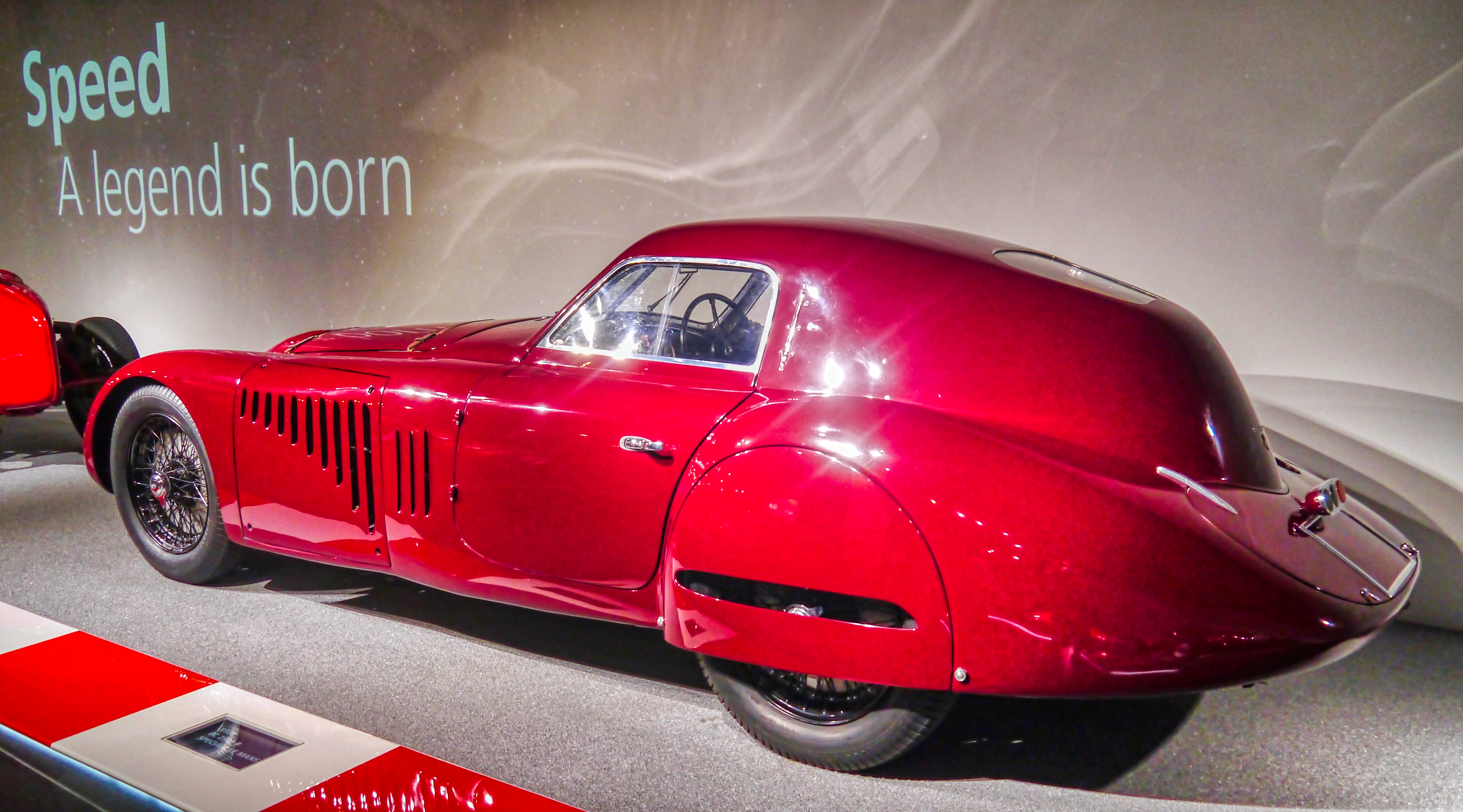
Rear ¾ view of the Le Mans Speciale at the Alfa Romeo Museum

Alfa Corse also prepared and entered a single 8C 2900B, chassis number 412033, for the 1938 24 Hours of Le Mans. The car featured a streamlined coupé body at a time when Le Mans racers were almost always open cars. The aerodynamic coupé was built by Carrozzeria Touring. In 1987, an Italian magazine had the car tested at the Pininfarina wind tunnel, where a Cx of 0.42 was measured, down to 0.37 with air intakes closed. The coupé, driven by Sommer and Biondetti, led for most of the race, but tyre trouble was then followed by a dropped valve. The car was driven to the pits, but had to retire there. At the time the valve dropped, the coupé had a lead of more than 160 km over the next car.

This was the only time the coupé was raced by Alfa Corse. After the war, it was entered in minor races under private ownership, was then displayed at the Donington museum from the 1960s before being added in 1987 to the Alfa Romeo museum, which now runs it at many events.

== Technical data ==
8C	8C 2300	8C 2600	8C 2900	8C 35 Type C
Engine:	Front mounted 8-cylinder in-line engine
displacement:	2336 cm^{3}	2557 cm^{3}	2905 cm^{3}	3822 cm^{3}
Bore x stroke:	65 x 88 mm	68 x 88 mm	68 x 100 mm	78 x 100 mm
Max power at rpm:	142 hp at 5000 rpm	215 hp at 5600 rpm	2900B: 180 hp at 5200 rpm	330 hp at 5500 rpm
Valve control:	2 overhead camshafts, 2 valves per cylinder, DOHC
Compression:	6.6:1	6.5:1		8.0:1
Carburetor:	Memini S142P 36		2 Weber 42 BS1
Induction:	Roots compressor		2 Roots compressor
Gearbox:	5-speed Manual	4-speed manual
Suspension front:	Rigid axle, semi-elliptic leaf springs, friction dampers		Twin trailing arms, coil springs over dampers	Twin trailing arms, torsion bar springs, hydraulic shock absorbers
Suspension rear:	Rigid axle, semi-elliptic leaf springs, friction dampers		Swing axles, radius arms, transverse semi-elliptic leaf spring, hydraulic and friction dampers	Swing axles, transverse leaf spring, friction and hydraulic shock absorbers
Brakes:	drums, all-round		hydraulic drums, all-round
Chassis & body:	Ladder frame	Aluminium body on ladder frame	Aluminium body, steel tubular frame	Aluminium, sheet-metal frame
Wheelbase:	275 cm	265 cm	275 cm
Dry weight:	1000 kg	920 kg	850 kg	750 kg
Top speed:	170 km/h (106 mph)	217 km/h (135 mph)	2900B: 185 km/h (115 mph)	275 km/h (171 mph)
