= EAM Nuvolari S1 =

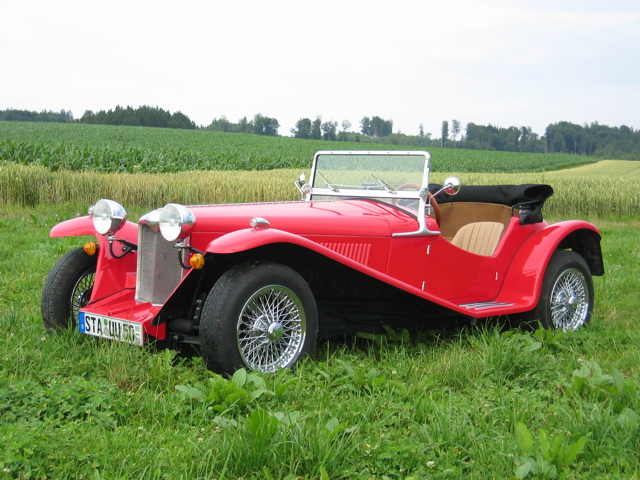

The EAM Nuvolari S1 was a limited production car announced in 1990 by the Munich-based company Edelsbrunner Automobile München. The style of the car was based on that of 1930s sports cars such as the Riley MPH. It took its name from racing driver Tazio Nuvolari.

The car was presented at the München Cars show.

== Technical data ==
Engine - Ford 16V -DOHC- 4 cylinders, Versions available: 1.6 L with 90 hp (67 kW), 1.8 L with 130 hp (97 kW), 2.0 L with 136 hp (101 kW).

Equipment:-

- Wheels by Aro
- Folding hood
- leather seats
- Mahogany dashboard

Accessories available:-

- cover
- Estep
- side screens
- Chromed wheels
- luggage rack

The price ranged from 60,000 to 68,000 DM in 1994 equal to approximately to USD45,000. 20 to 30 cars were made.

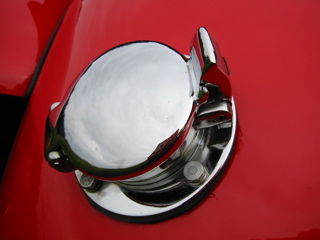

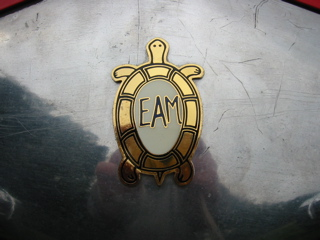
