= Gran Premio Nuvolari =

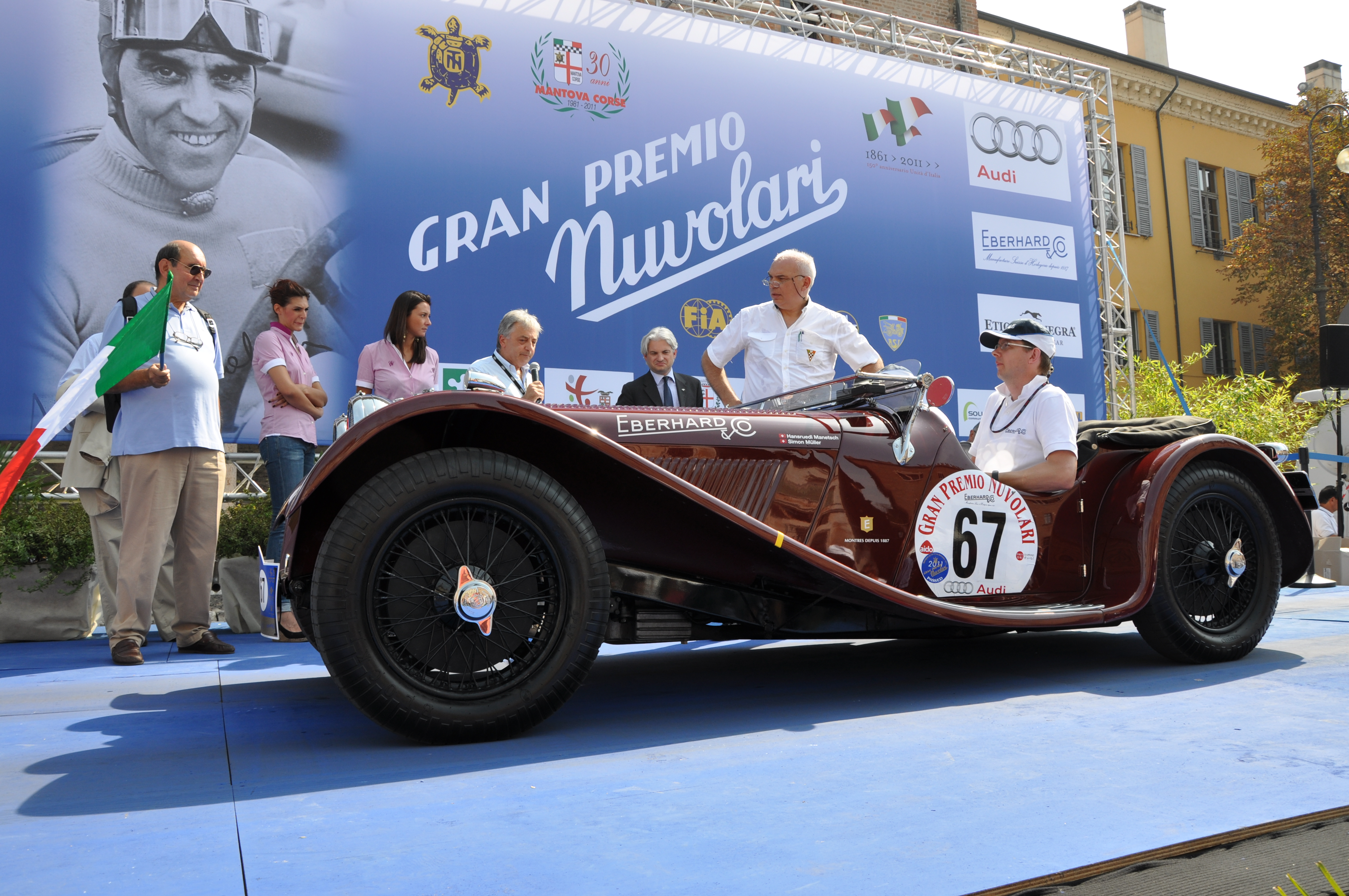
Jaguar SS100 of Vintage Racing Team Eberhard

The Gran Premio Nuvolari (English: Nuvolari Grand Prix) was a car race on open streets that was run in northern Italy in from 1954 to 1957. In 1991 it was reborn as an international vintage car race using the same name.

== Historic Gran Premio Nuvolari, 1954 until 1957 ==
The race began as a commemoration of racing pilot Tazio Nuvolari, who died on 11 August 1953. His death shocked motor sports community, including the organizers of the existing 1000 mile race Mille Miglia. The commemorative road race formed the final part of the Mille Miglia and had its starting point in Mantua, went through the Po Valley, over Cremona, to the finish in Brescia.

In 1955, the British racing driver Stirling Moss completed the Gran Premio Nuvolari with his navigator Dennis Jenkinson in a Mercedes SLR with the starting number 722 in just 39 minutes and 54 seconds with an average speed of 198.496 kilometers per hour. In 1957 the Italian government banned the Mille Miglia and Nuvolari road races, and they were no longer run.

== New Gran Premio Nuvolari, since 1991 ==
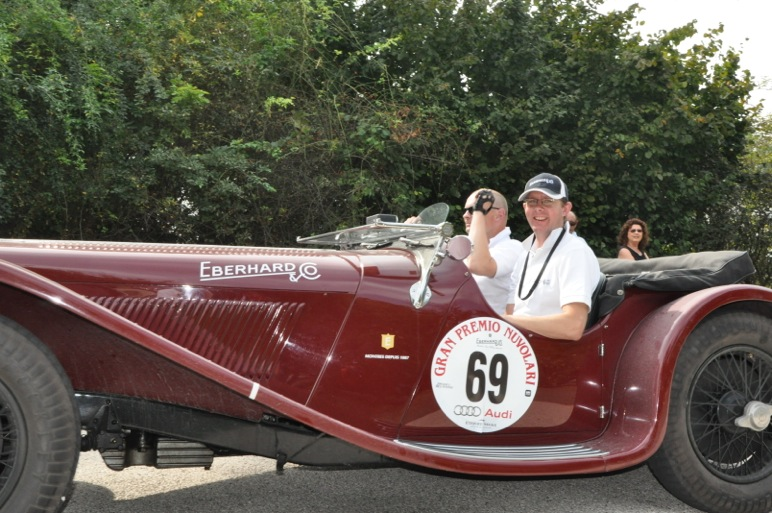
Jaguar SS100 GPN

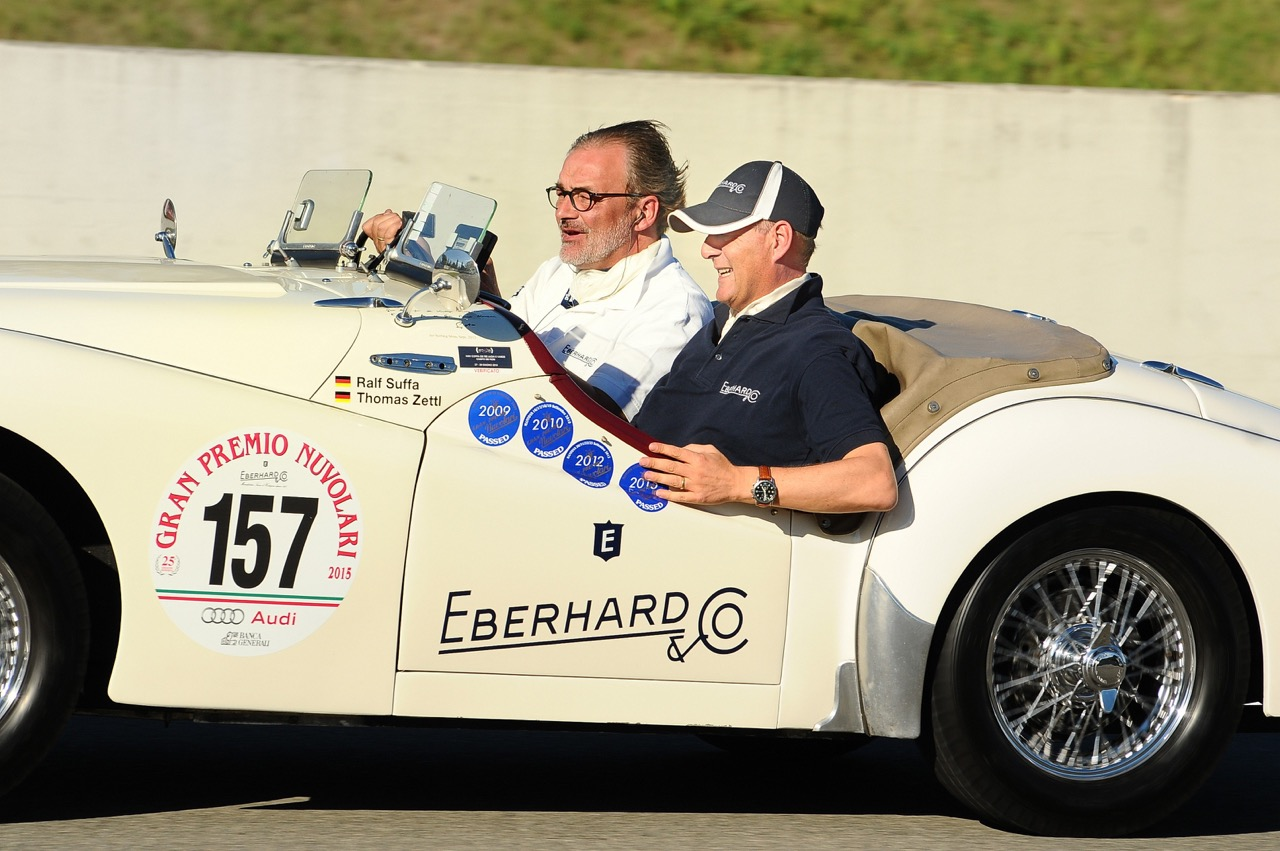
Triumph TR2 at the GPN

The members of the Mantovan Mantova Corse (Motorsportclub) Luca Bergamaschi, Marco Marani, Fabio Novelle and Claudio Rossi expanded and improved the Tazio Nuvolari-Museum in Mantova. With the sponsorship of the Swiss watchmaking company Eberhard & Co., which designed a special watch model to honor Tazio Nuvolari, the Gran Premio Nuvolari was rerun for the first time in 1991.

The route changes annually, starting and finishing in Mantua. It includes historic racetracks like the Autodromo Imola, as well as the cities of Rimini, Siena, and Ferrara.

Meanwhile, the event and its rating counted for Italian championship of classic car rally events. The Gran Premio Nuvolari has since become an international event featuring classic cars in compliance with the F.I.A. / F.I.V.A. / C.S.A.I. regulations.

Teams from 16 nations with their vintage cars built before 1969 participate in a total of more than 70 races covering more than 1,000 kilometers. In the event, not only is over all speed is important, but also precise compliance with the specified time for each stage.
