= Nuvola61 =

Nuvolari
- Country: Italy
- Broadcast area: Italy

Programming
- Language: Italian
- Picture format: 576i (16:9 SDTV)

Ownership
- Owner: GM Comunicazione

History
- Launched: February 2000
- Closed: 2017
- Former names: Nuvolari (2000-2016)

Links
- Website: http://www.nuvolari.tv/

Availability

Terrestrial
- DVB-T: Channel 61

Nuvola61 (formerly called Nuvolari) is an Italy-based sports and entertainment television channel part of Gruppo LT Multimedia. Its primary focus is on motorsports, as inferred by its name taken from Italian driver Tazio Nuvolari. Other properties that have been broadcast on the channel include the Spengler Cup (ice hockey), the Pro14 (rugby union) and Insane Championship Wrestling (professional wrestling). The channel has been discontinued in 2017.
