= Giuseppe Nuvolari =

Italian cyclist

Personal information
- Full name: Giuseppe Nuvolari
- Born: 30 January 1871 Castel d'Ario, Italy
- Died: 25 November 1962 (aged 91) Castel d'Ario, Italy

Cycling career
- Sport: Cycling
- Disciplines: Track and Road
- Role: Rider
Medal record
Men's track cycling
Italian National Championships
Gold medal – first place	1894	Motor-paced racing
Gold medal – first place	1904	Motor-paced racing
Silver medal – second place	1893	Motor-paced racing
Silver medal – second place	1895	Motor-paced racing
Bronze medal – third place	1903	Motor-paced racing

Giuseppe Nuvolari (30 January 1871 – 25 November 1962) was an Italian professional racing cyclist. His brother Arturo, who also competed as a cyclist, was the father of the motor and car racing ace Tazio Nuvolari.

On the track his specialty was Motor-paced racing, in this discipline, he won the Italian National Championship twice, in 1894 and 1904 and made the podium on three more occasions. In team races he frequently partnered with sprint ace Pietro Bixio.
