= Arturo Nuvolari =

Italian cyclist

Personal information
- Full name: Arturo Nuvolari
- Born: 7 July 1863 Castel d'Ario, Italy
- Died: 17 December 1938 (aged 75) Castel d'Ario, Italy

Cycling career
- Sport: Cycling
- Discipline: Road
- Role: Rider
Medal record
Men's road bicycle racing
Italian National Championships
Silver medal – second place	1893 Alessandria	Elite road race

Arturo Nuvolari (7 July 1863 – 17 December 1938) was an Italian professional racing cyclist. He was the father of the motor and car racing ace Tazio Nuvolari. The highlight of his career was winning the silver medal at the 1893 Italian Road Racing Championship in Alessandria. His brother Giuseppe was a multiple champion in the Motor-paced racing discipline.
