= Riley MPH =

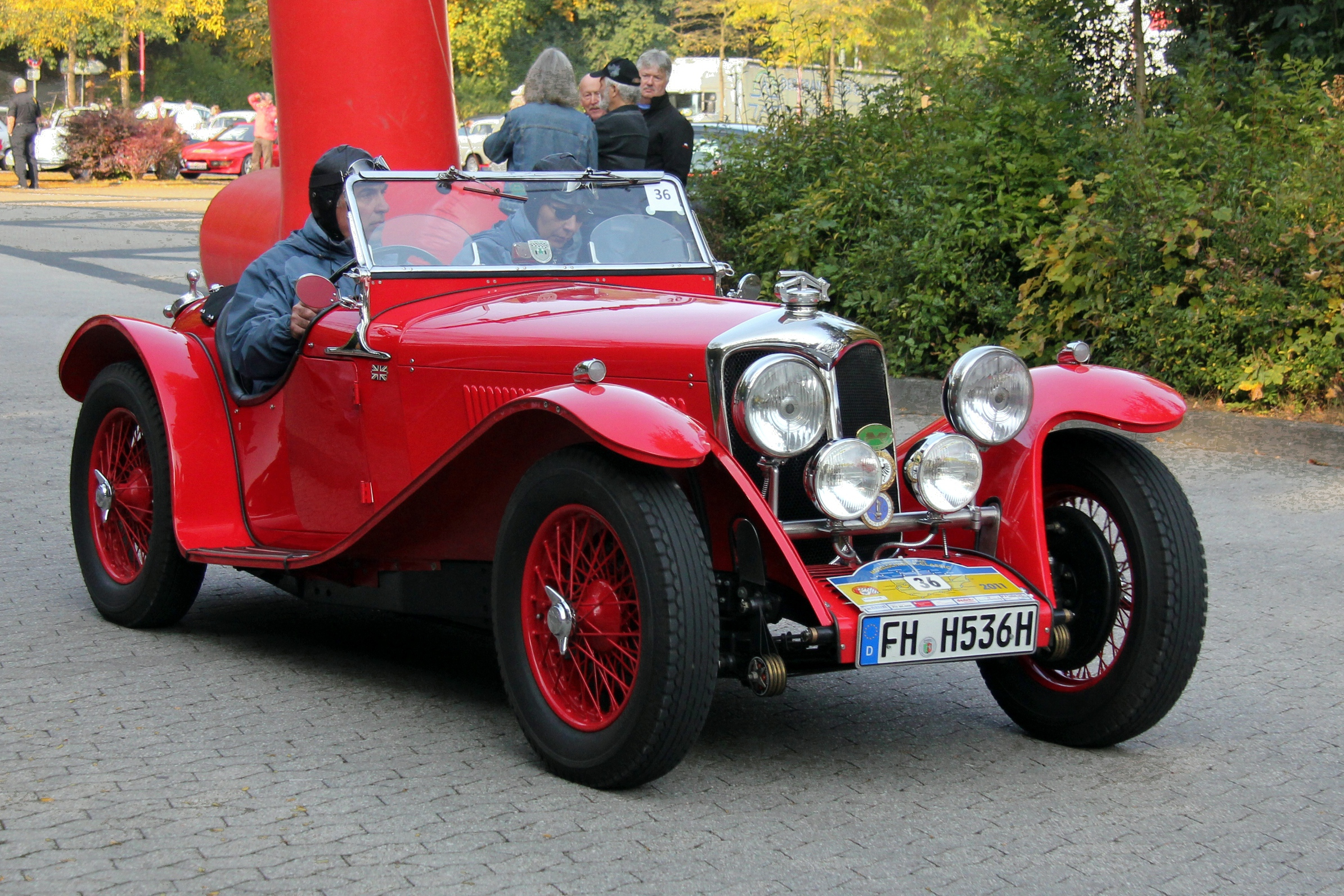

Overview
- Manufacturer: Riley
- Production: 1934–1935; Approx 15 made

Body and chassis
- Body style: two-seat sports

Powertrain
- Engine: 1.4, 1.6 or 1.7 L Straight-6
- Transmission: 4-speed manual or preselector

Dimensions
- Wheelbase: 97.5 inches (2477 mm)
- Length: 144 inches (3658 mm)
- Width: 57.5 inches (1460 mm)

Chronology
- Predecessor: none
- Successor: Riley Sprite

The Riley MPH is a small production, two-seat sports car made between 1934 and 1935 by the Riley company of Coventry, England. Very few were made, and examples are now highly sought after.

The chassis, with half-elliptic springs and rigid axles front and rear, was based on that of the car prepared for the 1933 TT races. To keep the height down to as low as possible, the side members were positioned under the axle at the rear. Large, fifteen-inch drum brakes were used. The bodywork was mainly made of aluminium, built over a traditional wood frame, and featured a long bonnet, front wings flowing into running boards and a short, rounded tail. The windscreen could fold flat to reduce air resistance.

A choice of three sizes of the six-cylinder engine was available, 1458 cc, 1633 cc or 1726 cc fitted with triple or more usually twin SU carburettors. The engines had the traditional Riley arrangement of twin camshafts mounted high in the crankcase. Aluminium alloy connecting rods were used. The 1726 engine had an output of 56.8 PS (56.0 bhp) (41.8 kW) at 4800 rpm. Drive was to the rear wheels through a choice of either a four-speed manual "crash" gear box or an ENV pre-selector gearbox supplied by Armstrong Siddeley. The top speed of the 17 hp (1726 cc) engined version was approximately 90 mph (145 km/h).

The exact number made is not known, but is believed to be around 15, and it was expensive at £550. Numerous replicas have, however, been made. Fourteen original cars are thought to survive.
