= Tazio Nuvolari =

Italian racing driver (1892–1953)

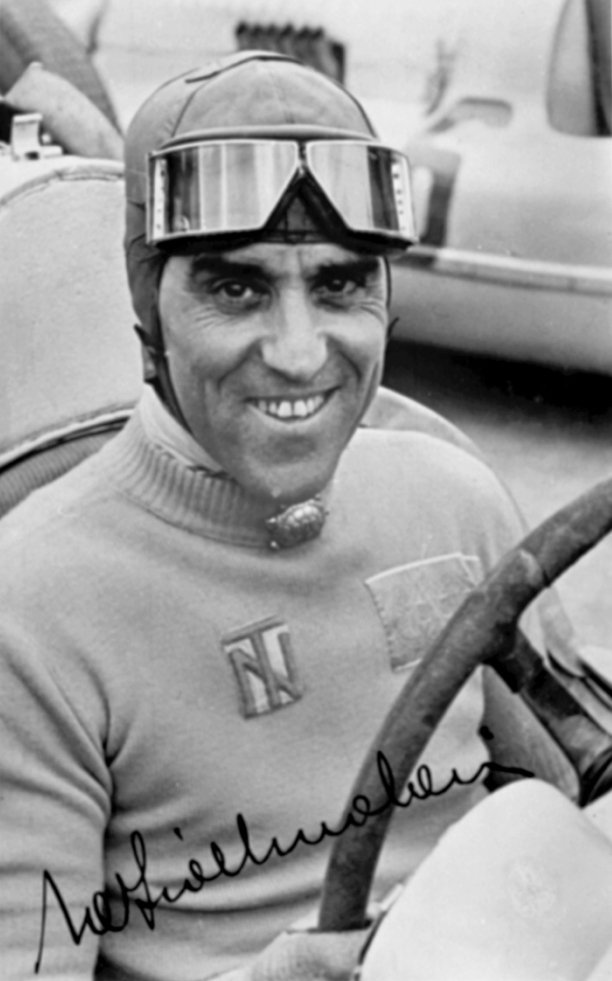
- Nuvolari at the Belgrade Grand Prix in 1939
- Nationality: (Italy) Italian
- Born: Tazio Giorgio Nuvolari; 16 November 1892 Castel d'Ario, Kingdom of Italy
- Died: 11 August 1953 (aged 60) Mantua, Italy

Championship titles
- AIACR European Drivers' Championship (1932); Major victories Monaco Grand Prix (1932); 24 Hours of Le Mans (1933); Vanderbilt Cup (1936)

European Championship career
- Years active: 1931–1932, 1935–1939
- Teams: Alfa Romeo, Ferrari, Auto Union
- Starts: 26
- Championships: 1 (1932)
- Wins: 4
- Podiums: 7
- Poles: 0
- Fastest laps: 4

Champ Car career
- 2 races run over 2 years
- Best finish: 5th (1936)
- First race: 1936 Vanderbilt Cup (Westbury)
- Last race: 1937 Vanderbilt Cup (Westbury)
- First win: 1936 Vanderbilt Cup (Westbury)
Wins	Podiums	Poles
1	1	0

24 Hours of Le Mans career
- Years: 1933
- Teams: Sommer
- Best finish: 1st (1933)
- Class wins: 1 (1933)

Tazio Giorgio Nuvolari (Italian: [ˈtattsjo ˈdʒordʒo nuvoˈlaːri]; 16 November 1892 – 11 August 1953) was an Italian racing driver who first raced motorcycles and then concentrated on sports cars and Grand Prix racing, where he achieved significant success. Originally of Mantua, he was nicknamed il Mantovano Volante ("the Flying Mantuan") and Nuvola ("Cloud"). His victories—72 major races, 150 in all—included 24 Grands Prix, five Coppa Cianos, two Mille Miglias, two Targa Florios, two RAC Tourist Trophies, a Le Mans 24-hour race, and a European Championship in Grand Prix racing. Ferdinand Porsche called him "the greatest driver of the past, the present, and the future".

== Early life and career ==
Nuvolari was born in Castel d'Ario, near Mantua, Lombardy, on 16 November 1892 to Arturo Nuvolari and his wife Elisa Zorzi. The family was well acquainted with motor racing, as Arturo and his brother Giuseppe were both bicycle racers—Giuseppe was a multiple winner of the Italian national championship and was particularly admired by a young Tazio. Nuvolari was married to Carolina Perina, and together they had two children: Giorgio (born 4 September 1918), who died in 1937 aged 19 from myocarditis, and Alberto, who died in 1946 aged 18 from nephritis.

Nuvolari started racing motorcycles in 1920 at the age of 27, winning the 1925 350cc European Championship. Having raced cars as well as motorcycles from 1925 until 1930, he then concentrated on cars, and won the 1932 European Championship with the Alfa Romeo factory team, Alfa Corse. After Alfa Romeo officially withdrew from Grand Prix racing, Nuvolari drove for Scuderia Ferrari. The team was owned by Enzo Ferrari, who ran the Alfa Romeo cars semi-officially. In 1933, Nuvolari won Le Mans in an Alfa Romeo as a member of Ferrari's team, and a month later won the Belgian Grand Prix in a works Maserati, having switched teams a week before the race.

Benito Mussolini helped persuade Ferrari to take Nuvolari back for 1935, and in that year he won the German Grand Prix in Ferrari's outdated Alfa Romeo, defeating more powerful rivals from Mercedes-Benz and Auto Union. It was the only time a non-German car won a European Championship race from 1935 to 1939. The relationship with Ferrari deteriorated during 1937, and Nuvolari raced an Auto Union in that year's Swiss Grand Prix. He rejoined the Auto Union team for the 1938 season and stayed with them through 1939 until Grand Prix racing was put on hiatus by World War II. The only major European race he never won was the Czechoslovakian Grand Prix. When Nuvolari resumed racing after the war he was 54 and in poor health. In his final appearance in competition, driving a Cisitalia-Abarth Tipo 204A at a Palermo hillclimb on 10 April 1950, he won his class and placed fifth overall. He died in 1953 from a stroke.

== Racing career ==
=== Motorcycle racing ===
Nuvolari obtained his license for motorcycle racing in 1915 at the age of 23. He served in the Italian army as an ambulance driver in World War I, and in 1920 took part in his first motorcycle race at the Circuito Internazionale Motoristico in Cremona but did not finish. He also raced cars, winning the Coppa Verona reliability trial in 1921.

In 1925, Nuvolari became the 350 cc European Motorcycling champion by winning the European Grand Prix. At the time, the European Grand Prix was considered the most important race of the motorcycling season and the winners in each category were designated European Champions. He won the Nations Grand Prix four times between 1925 and 1928, and the Lario Circuit race five times between 1925 and 1929, all in the 350 cc class on a Bianchi motorcycle.

It was also in 1925 that Alfa Romeo, seeking a driver to replace Antonio Ascari, who had been killed in the French Grand Prix in July, tested Nuvolari in their Grand Prix car with a view to running him in the Italian Grand Prix in September. He crashed when the gearbox seized, and severely lacerated his back. He was not picked for the team. Six days later, in bandages, with a cushion strapped to his stomach, and lifted onto his motorcycle by Bianchi mechanics for a push-start, he won the rain-soaked Nations Grand Prix at Monza.

=== Auto racing ===
==== 1930–1932: Alfa Corse ====
1930

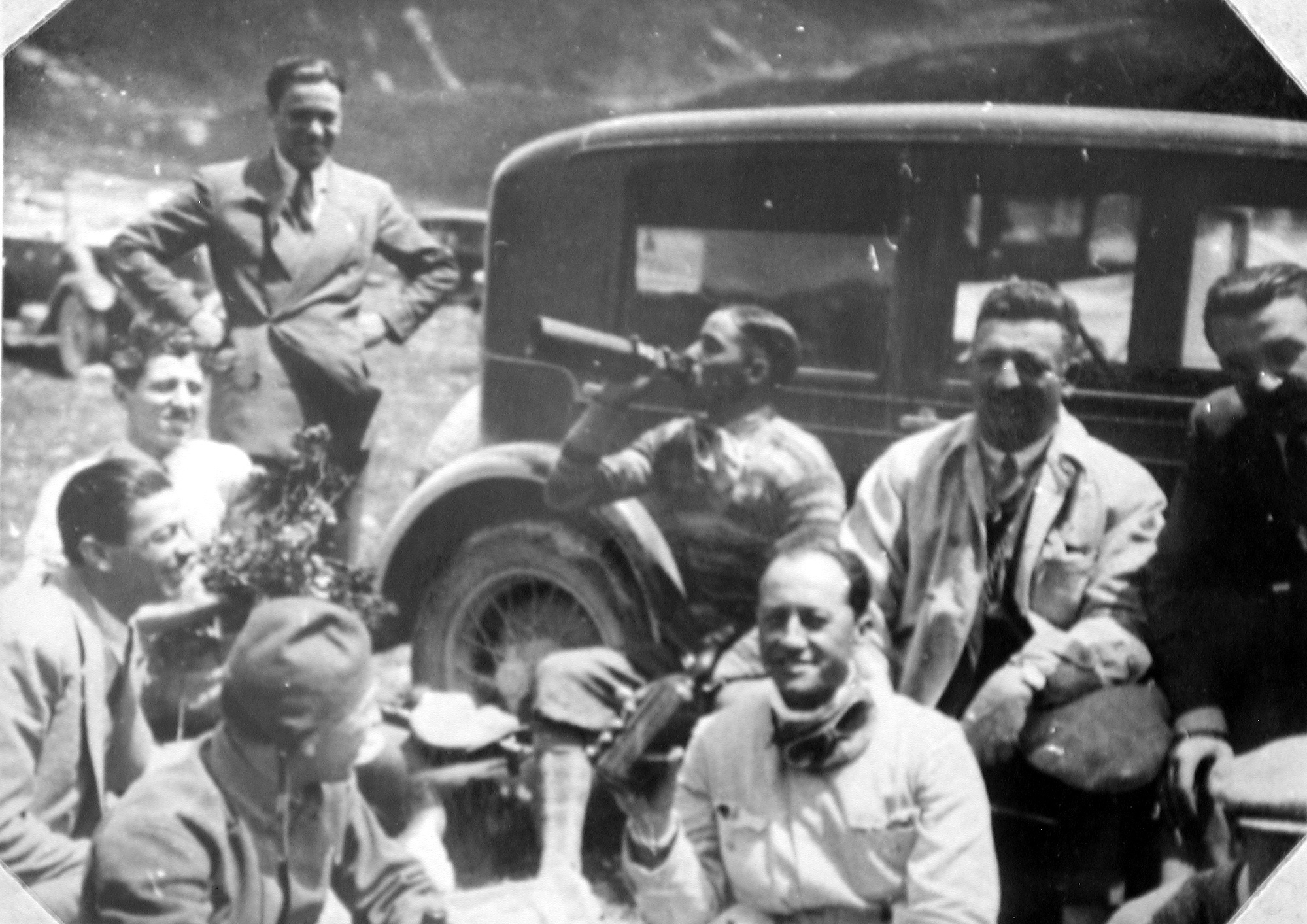
Nuvolari (fifth from left), with other Alfa Romeo drivers and Enzo Ferrari

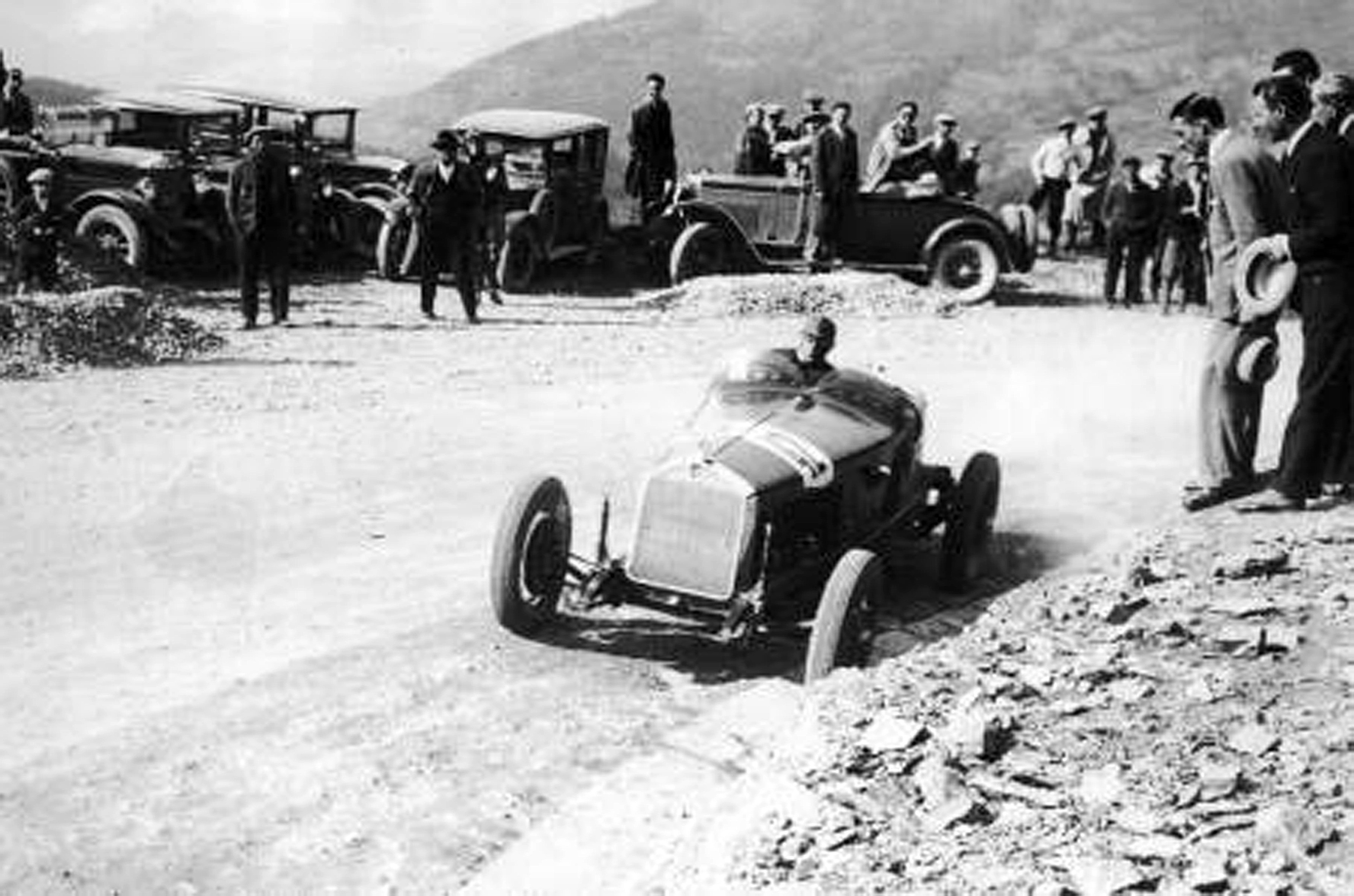
Nuvolari racing an Alfa Romeo 6C 1750GS in the 1930 Coppa della Consuma

In 1930, Nuvolari won his first RAC Tourist Trophy (he won again in 1933). Motor racing legend has it that when one of the drivers broke the window of a butcher's shop, Nuvolari drove onto the pavement and tried to grab a ham as he passed. According to Sammy Davis who met him there, Nuvolari enjoyed dark humour and situations when everything went wrong. For example, after he got a ticket for a journey home from the Sicilian Targa Florio he said to Enzo Ferrari, "What a strange businessman you are. What if I am brought back in a coffin?" Nuvolari and co-driver Battista Guidotti won the Mille Miglia in a Zagato-bodied Alfa Romeo 6C 1750 GS, becoming the first to complete the race at an average of over 100 km/h (62 mph). At night, leading on elapsed time but still lying behind his teammate Achille Varzi on the road because he had started after him, he tailed Varzi at speeds of up to 150 km/h (93 mph) with his headlights switched off, so that he could not be seen in the other car's rear-view mirrors. He eventually switched them on to overtake "the shocked" Varzi near the finish at Brescia.

1931

Towards the end of 1930, Nuvolari decided to stop racing motorcycles and concentrate fully on cars for 1931. Regulations for the season required Grand Prix races to be at least 10 hours long. For the Italian Grand Prix, Nuvolari was to share an Alfa Romeo with Baconin Borzacchini. The car started from ninth place on the grid, and when it retired with mechanical problems after 33 laps Nuvolari teamed up with Giuseppe Campari. The pair took the race win, although Nuvolari could not receive the championship points. Apart from the Belgian Grand Prix, where he came second, the only other European Championship race was the French Grand Prix, where he finished 11th. The same year, he won both the Coppa Ciano at Livorno and the arduous Targa Florio, which was run on the 92-mile (146 km) Grande variant of the super-twisty course that year.

1932

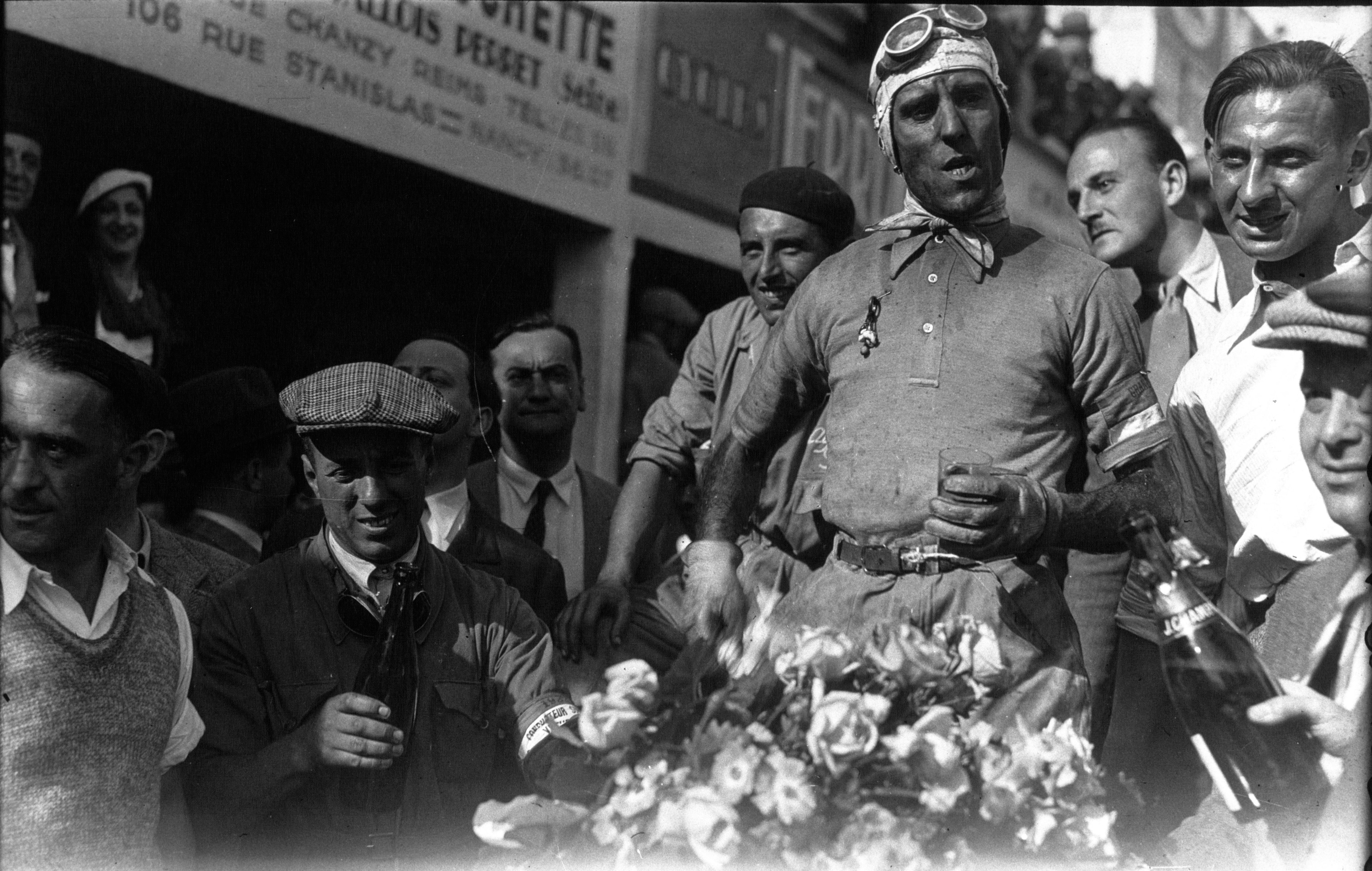
Nuvolari after winning the 1932 French Grand Prix

For 1932, Grands Prix had to be between five and ten hours long. It was the only season in which Nuvolari regularly drove one of the fastest cars, the Alfa Romeo P3, and he took two wins and a second place from the three European Championship Grands Prix, plus victory in the championship by four points from Borzacchini. He achieved four other race wins that year, including the prestigious Monaco Grand Prix and a second Targa Florio. Of the latter, his mechanic Mabelli said: "Before the start, Nuvolari told me to go down on the floor of the car every time he shouts, which was a signal that he went to a curve too fast and that we need to lower the car's center of mass. I spent the whole race on the floor. Nuvolari started to shout in the first curve and wouldn't stop until the last one." On 28 April 1932, the writer Gabriele d'Annunzio gave him a golden tortoise badge. Thereafter Nuvolari wore it as a talisman, and it became famously associated with him, along with his initialled yellow jumper.

==== 1933–1937: Scuderia Ferrari and Maserati ====
"Tazio Nuvolari was not simply a racing driver. To Italy he became an idol, a demi-god, a legend, epitomising all that young Italy aspired to be; the man who 'did the impossible', not once but habitually, the David who slew the Goliaths in the great sport of motor racing. He was Il Maestro."

— Cyril Posthumus

1933

The 1933 season began a two-year hiatus in the European Championship, and although Alfa Romeo ceased official involvement in Grands Prix their cars continued racing with Enzo Ferrari's privateer team. For economic reasons, the P3 was not passed on to Ferrari so they used its predecessor, the Monza. Maserati, with a much-improved car, provided the main opposition. It has been alleged that Nuvolari was involved in a race-fixing scandal at the Tripoli Grand Prix. The story is that he conspired with Achille Varzi and Baconin Borzacchini to fix the race in order to profit from the Libyan state lottery in which 30 tickets were drawn before the race—one for each starter—and the holder of the ticket corresponding to the victorious driver won 7.5 million lire. Others say the allegation was unfounded and that it originated with Alfred Neubauer, the Mercedes-Benz team manager at the time, who was well known as a raconteur with a penchant for spicing up a story. Neubauer's version does not altogether hold true with documented records of events, which indicate that Nuvolari, Varzi, and Borzacchini agreed to pool the prize money should one of them win.

For the 1933 24 Hours of Le Mans, Alfa Romeo teamed Nuvolari with Raymond Sommer. Sommer asked to drive the majority of the race as he was more familiar with the circuit and thought Nuvolari would probably break the car. When Nuvolari countered that he was a leading Grand Prix driver and Le Mans was a simple layout that would not trouble him, they agreed to divide the driving equally. In the race, they built a two-lap lead before a leaking fuel tank forced them to stop at the pits, where the leak was plugged by chewing gum. More stops were necessary as the makeshift repair came undone several times. Nuvolari, driving through to the end of the race, broke the lap record nine times and won by approximately 400 yards (370 m).

1934

"Let any who say it was foolhardy at least be honest and admit it was one of the finest exhibitions of pluck and grit ever seen. By such men are victories won!"

— Earl Howe, on Nuvolari racing in the 1934 AVUS-Rennen with a broken leg in a plaster cast

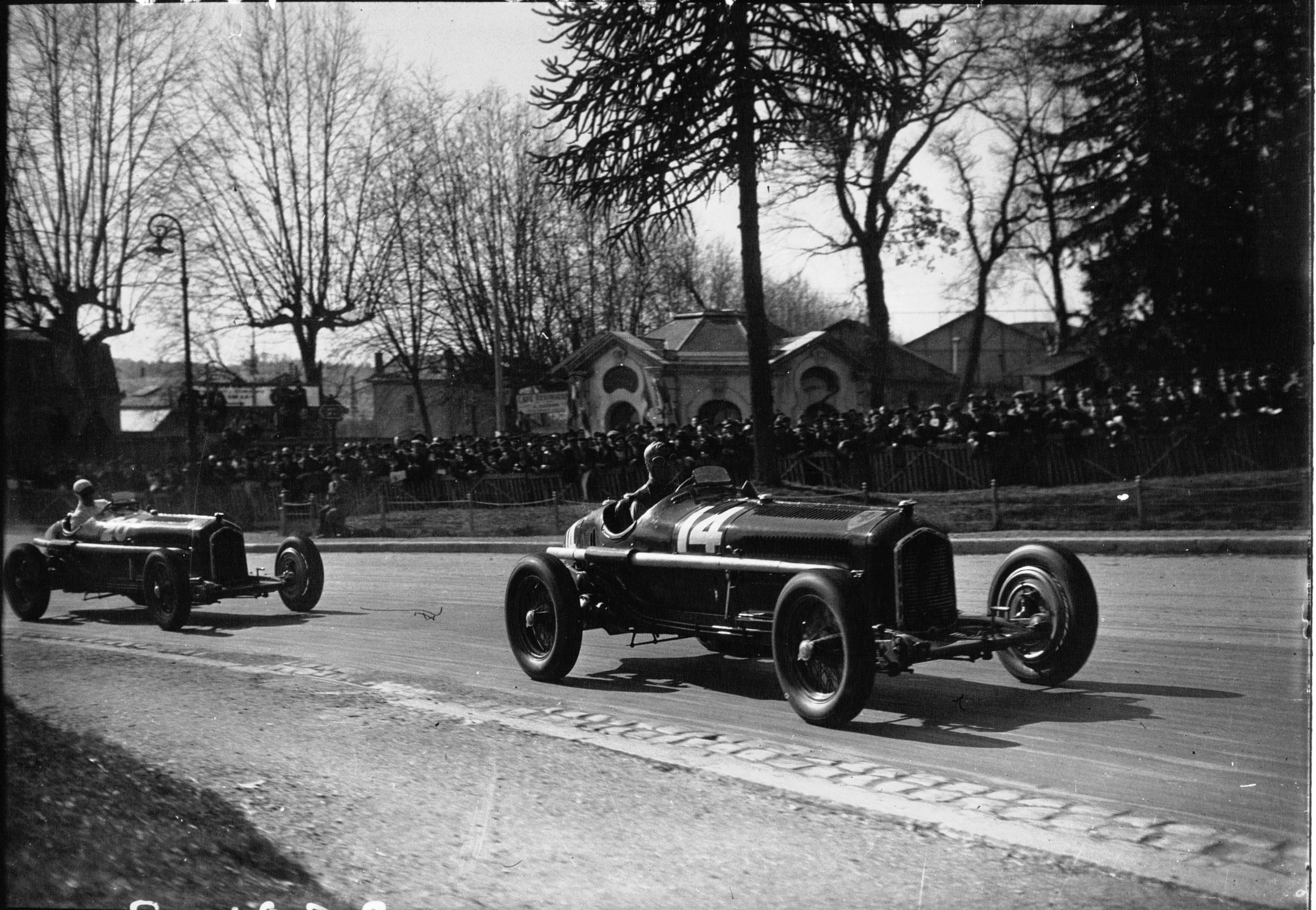
Nuvolari driving an Alfa Romeo P3 in the 1935 Grand Prix de Pau

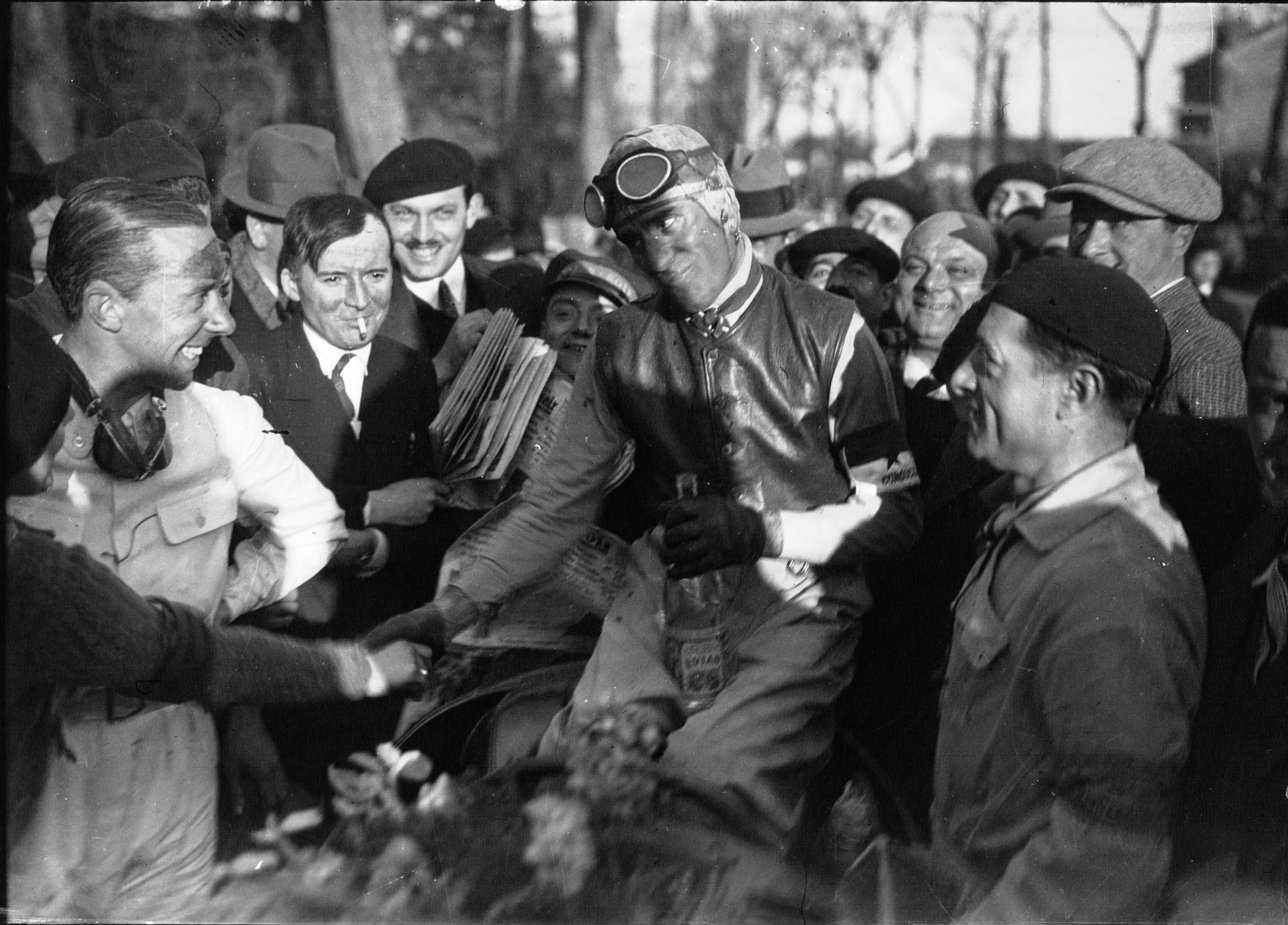
Nuvolari after winning the 1935 Grand Prix de Pau

In April 1934 Nuvolari entered the Monaco Grand Prix in a privately owned Bugatti and worked up to third place before brake problems forced him back to fifth at the finish, two laps behind the winner, Guy Moll. Racing in heavy rain at Alessandria in the Circuito di Pietro Bordino race, he crashed and broke a leg: balked by Trossi's Alfa Romeo P3, he lost control of his privately entered Maserati 8CM, which skidded, rolled, and hit a tree. Bored in hospital, he decided to enter the AVUS-Rennen just over four weeks later. As his left leg was too badly injured to operate the clutch, his Maserati was modified for him to work the pedals with his right foot. Troubled by cramp, he finished fifth.

By the time of the Penya Rhin Grand Prix in late June, Nuvolari's leg was finally out of plaster but still painful. He retired his Maserati with technical problems. In the Italian Grand Prix, he debuted Maserati's new 6C-34 model. It performed poorly and Nuvolari could finish only fifth, three laps behind the Mercedes-Benz W25s of Caracciola and Fagioli, and also trailing the Auto Union As of Stuck and Leiningen, and the Alfa Romeo P3s of Trossi, Comotti, and Chiron. At the end of September, he finished third in the Czechoslovakian Grand Prix (Masaryk Circuit), behind Caracciola and Stuck.

1935

For 1935, Nuvolari set his sights on a drive with the German Auto Union team. It lacked top-line drivers but relented to pressure from Achille Varzi, which did not want Nuvolari in the team. Nuvolari then approached Enzo Ferrari, who at first rebuffed him as he had previously walked out on the team. Italy's prime minister Mussolini helped persuade Ferrari to take Nuvolari back.

This was the year that Nuvolari achieved 'The Impossible Victory', which many regard as the greatest win in all of motor racing history: driving an outclassed Alfa Romeo P3 (3167 cc, supercharged, 265 hp) in the German Grand Prix at the Nürburgring, he beat all the dominant German cars—five Mercedes-Benz W25s (3990 cc, 8C, supercharged, 375 hp (280 kW) driven by Caracciola, Fagioli, Lang, von Brauchitsch, and Geyer), and four Auto Union Bs (4950 cc, 16C, supercharged, 375 hp (280 kW) driven by Rosemeyer, Varzi, Stuck, and Pietsch). The crowd of 300,000 applauded Nuvolari, but the representatives of Nazi Germany were enraged.

1936

Nuvolari had a big accident in May during practice for the Tripoli Grand Prix and it is alleged that he broke some vertebrae. Despite a limp, he took part in the race the following day and finished eighth. In October, he traveled to the U.S. for the American Automobile Association (AAA) sanctioned Vanderbilt Cup. Starting eighth, Nuvolari took the lead from Antonio Brivio on the second lap of the 75-lap event, leading from then until the finish.

1937

At the beginning of 1937, Alfa Romeo took its works team back from Ferrari and entered it as part of the Alfa Corse team. Nuvolari stayed with Alfa Romeo despite becoming increasingly frustrated with the poor build quality of its racing cars. At the Coppa Acerbo, Alfa Romeo's new 12C-37 car proved to be slow and unreliable. Frustrated, Nuvolari handed his car over to Giuseppe Farina mid-race. Not wanting to leave Alfa Romeo, he drove an Auto Union in the Swiss Grand Prix as a one-off. After the Italian Grand Prix, Alfa Romeo withdrew from racing for the remainder of the season and dismissed Vittorio Jano, its chief designer.

==== 1938–1939: Auto Union ====
1938

Although Nuvolari started the 1938 Grand Prix season as an Alfa Romeo driver, a split fuel tank in the first race of the season at the Pau Grand Prix was enough for him to walk out on the team, critical of the poor workmanship that was exhibited. Being well over 40 years old, he announced his retirement from Grand Prix racing and took a holiday in America. In January 1938, team leader Bernd Rosemeyer died in a record attempt, and Auto Union had to rely on inexperienced drivers or motorcycle drivers for their unique Rear mid-engine, rear-wheel-drive layout race cars. Following the Tripoli Grand Prix they contacted Nuvolari who, having been refreshed from his break, agreed to drive for the highly successful German team, who were running radical mid-engined cars. Nuvolari found further success with Auto Union; now driving a faster and more reliable car that enabled him to compete for victories and the European Championship, Nuvolari won his home 1938 Italian Grand Prix at Monza and won the 1938 Donington Grand Prix in England.

1939

In 1939, Nuvolari won the Belgrade Grand Prix which was held on 3 September 1939, the last one before outbreak of World War II.

== Post-war racing ==
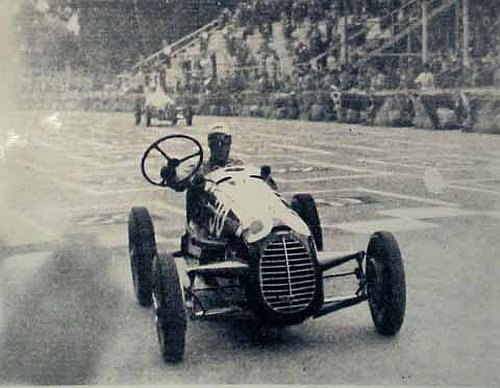
Steering wheel adrift on his Cisitalia D46, Nuvolari finishes 13th in the 1946 Coppa Brezzi.

In 1946, Nuvolari took part in thirteen races, winning the Grand Prix of Albi in a Maserati 4CL, finishing 4th in the Grand Prix of Nations and 13th in the Coppa Brezzi, and retiring from the others. It was noted that when he raced at Milan in September, he steered with mostly one hand; the other held a bloodstained handkerchief over his mouth.

Through 1947 and 1948, Nuvolari raced eleven times, winning twice. He finished 2nd, 3rd, 4th, and 7th, and retired from the remaining five races. His Maserati did not qualify for the 1949 Marseilles Grand Prix. Battered by health problems as well as the loss of his two sons, Nuvolari was nevertheless persuaded by Enzo Ferrari to race in the 1948 edition of the Mille Miglia. Paired with mechanic Sergio Scapinelli, Nuvolari took the lead in the early stages of the race. He was eventually forced to retire the car in Reggio Emilia when he had a 27-minutes lead. Nuvolari's last appearance in competition was at the Palermo-Montepellegrino hillclimb on 10 April 1950, driving a Squadra Abarth Cisitalia-Abarth 204. He won his class and finished fifth overall.

== Death and legacy ==
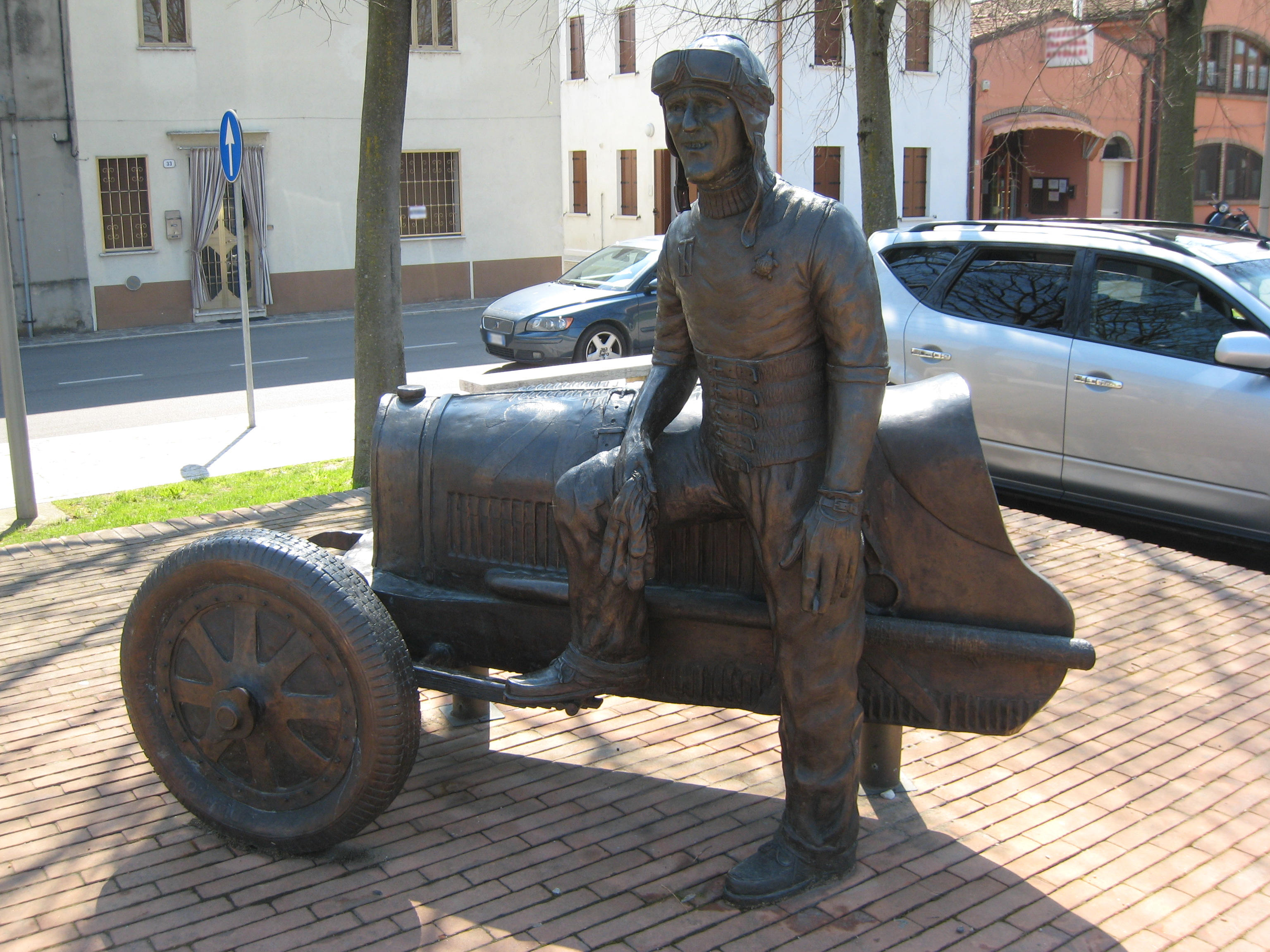
Statue of Nuvolari in Castel d'Ario

"…there will never be another Nuvolari and I shall always think of him as incomparable, the greatest of them all."

— From editor John Cooper's Nuvolari obituary in The Autocar, 21 August 1953

Nuvolari never formally announced his retirement, but his health deteriorated and he became increasingly solitary. In 1952 a stroke left him partially paralysed, and he died in bed a year later from a second one. Between 25,000 and 55,000 people, at least half the population of Mantua, attended his funeral in a mile-long procession, with the coffin placed on a car chassis that was pushed by Alberto Ascari, Luigi Villoresi, and Juan Manuel Fangio. He is buried in the family tomb in the Cimitero Degli Angeli, on the road from Mantua to Cremona. The inscription over the door reads: Correrai Ancor Più Veloce Per Le Vie Del Cielo (Italian for 'You will race even faster along the roads of heaven').

The Museum Tazio Nuvolari is located in his homestead at Giulia Romano via N. Sauro in Mantua. In Castel d'Ario there is a bronze statue of Nuvolari on a marble plinth inscribed Nivola – Campione Automobilistico di Tutti Tempi (Nivola – Champion Driver of All Time); and at the end of Mantua's Via delle Rimembranze, the street where he lived towards the end of his life, is a square that is called Piazza Nuvolari.

The Cisitalia 202 SMM Nuvolari Spider, EAM Nuvolari S1, and Audi Nuvolari Quattro are named after him, and Maserati offers the colour Grigio-Nuvolari from their custom palette. Nuvolari was an early exponent (if not the inventor, according to Enzo Ferrari) of the four-wheel drift cornering technique which was later utilised by drivers such as Stirling Moss.

An Italian pay-TV channel featuring motor sports is also named "Nuvolari". The online video interview platform Tazio is named after him. In the 1961 The Twilight Zone episode, "A Game of Pool", Nuvolari is referenced by Jonathan Winters (Fats Brown) when talking to Jack Klugman (Jessie Cardiff) about great men in history. Nuvolari was mentioned in 1969 comedy film Monte Carlo or Bust! when Angelo Pincilli and Marcelo Agosti, two Italian policemen taking part in the Monte Carlo Rally, hope to become as famous as Nuvolari and land speed record holder Malcolm Campbell by winning the race. The 1976 album Automobili by Italian singer-songwriter Lucio Dalla, included the song "Nuvolari", with lyrics by poet Roberto Roversi. A Six Metre racing yacht built in the 1978 for Luca and Tony Bassani was named Nuvolari in honour of the racing driver. That yacht was restored in 2016 and races in Victoria, British Columbia.

Audi, in acknowledgement of Nuvolari giving Auto Union their last grand prix victory, ran a special livery for the 2026 Monaco Grand Prix in honour of him, replacing the red with yellow.

== Motorsports career results ==
=== Notable victories ===
Year	Location	Vehicle
1924	Savio Circuit	Chiribiri Monza (1.5 litre)
1924	Polesine Circuit	Chiribiri Monza (1.5 litre)
1924	Tigullio Circuit	Bianchi 20 (2 litre)
1927	Rome Grand Prix	Bugatti T35
1927	Garda Circuit	Bugatti T35C
1928	Tripoli Grand Prix	Bugatti T35C
1928	Pozzo Circuit	Bugatti T35C
1928	Alessandria Circuit	Bugatti T35
1930	Mille Miglia	Alfa Romeo 6C 1750
1931	Targa Florio	Alfa Romeo 8C 2300 Monza
1931	Coppa Ciano	Alfa Romeo 8C 2300 Monza
1932	Monaco Grand Prix	Alfa Romeo 8C 2300 Monza
1932	Targa Florio	Alfa Romeo 8C 2300 Monza
1932	Italian Grand Prix	Alfa Romeo Type B/P3
1932	Grand Prix de L'A.C.F	Alfa Romeo Type B/P3
1932	Coppa Ciano	Alfa Romeo Type B/P3
1932	Coppa Acerbo	Alfa Romeo Type B/P3
1933	Tunis Grand Prix	Alfa Romeo 8C 2600 Monza
1933	Alessandria	Alfa Romeo 8C 2600 Monza
1933	Eifelrennen	Alfa Romeo 8C 2600 Monza
1933	Nîmes Grand Prix	Alfa Romeo 8C 2600 Monza
1933	Belgian Grand Prix	Maserati 8CM
1933	Coppa Ciano	Maserati 8CM
1933	Nice Grand Prix	Maserati 8CM
1933	RAC Tourist Trophy, Ards	MG K3 Magnette
1933	24 Hours of Le Mans	Alfa Romeo 8C 2300 Monza
1933	Mille Miglia	Alfa Romeo 8C 2300 Monza
1934	Modena Grand Prix	Maserati 6C 34
1934	Naples Grand Prix	Maserati 6C 34
1935	Pau Grand Prix	Alfa Romeo Type B/P3
1935	Bergamo Circuit	Alfa Romeo Type B/P3
1935	Biella Circuit	Alfa Romeo Type B/P3
1935	Turin Circuit	Alfa Romeo Type B/P3
1935	German Grand Prix	Alfa Romeo Type B/P3
1935	Coppa Ciano	Alfa Romeo Type B/P3
1935	Nice Grand Prix	Alfa Romeo Type B/P3
1935	Modena Grand Prix	Alfa Romeo 8C-35
1936	Penya Rhin Grand Prix	Alfa Romeo 12C-36
1936	Hungarian Grand Prix	Alfa Romeo 8C-35
1936	Milan Grand Prix	Alfa Romeo 12C-36
1936	Coppa Ciano	Alfa Romeo 8C-35
1936	Modena Grand Prix	Alfa Romeo 12C-36
1936	Vanderbilt Cup	Alfa Romeo 12C-36
1937	Milan Grand Prix	Alfa Romeo 12C-36
1938	Italian Grand Prix	Auto Union Type D
1938	Donington Grand Prix	Auto Union Type D
1939	Belgrade Grand Prix	Auto Union Type D
1946	Albi Grand Prix	Maserati 4CL
1947	Mille Miglia (class S1.1)	Cisitalia 202 SMM

=== European Championship results ===
(key) (Races in bold indicate pole position) (Races in italics indicate fastest lap)

Year	Entrant	Chassis	Engine	1	2	3	4	5	6	7	EDC	Pts
1931	SA Alfa Romeo	Alfa Romeo Type A	Alfa Romeo 2x 3.5 L6	ITA; 1 / ret							5th	13
1931	SA Alfa Romeo	Alfa Romeo Monza	Alfa Romeo 2.3 L8		FRA; 11						5th	13
1931	SA Alfa Romeo	Alfa Romeo 8C-2300	Alfa Romeo 2.3 L8			BEL; 2					5th	13
1932	SA Alfa Romeo	Alfa Romeo Tipo B/P3	Alfa Romeo 2.6 L8	ITA; 1	FRA; 1	GER; 2					1st	4
1935	Scuderia Ferrari	Alfa Romeo Tipo B/P3	Alfa Romeo 3.2 L8	MON; Ret	FRA; Ret	BEL	GER; 1	SUI; 5			4th	35
1935	Scuderia Ferrari	Alfa Romeo 8C-35	Alfa Romeo 3.8 L8						ITA; Ret	ESP; Ret	4th	35
1936	Scuderia Ferrari	Alfa Romeo 8C-35	Alfa Romeo 3.8 L8	MON; 4							3rd	17
1936	Scuderia Ferrari	Alfa Romeo 12C 1936	Alfa Romeo 4.1 V12		GER; Ret	SUI; Ret	ITA; 2				3rd	17
1937	Scuderia Ferrari	Alfa Romeo 12C-36	Alfa Romeo 4.1 V12	BEL	GER; 4	MON		ITA; 7			7th	28
1937	Auto Union AG	Auto Union C	Auto Union 6.0 V16				SUI; 5				7th	28
1938	Auto Union AG	Auto Union D	Auto Union 3.0 V12	FRA	GER; Ret	SUI; 9	ITA; 1				5th	20
1939	Auto Union AG	Auto Union D	Auto Union 3.0 V12	BEL; Ret	FRA; Ret	GER; Ret	SUI; 5				4th	19

=== Post-WWII Grandes Épreuves results ===
(key) (Races in bold indicate pole position; races in italics indicate fastest lap)

Year	Entrant	Chassis	Engine	1	2	3	4
1948	Cisitalia Spa	Cisitalia D46	Fiat 1.1 L4	MON; Ret	SUI		
1948	Scuderia Ambrosiana	Maserati 4CLT/48	Maserati 4CLT 1.5 L4 s			FRA; 7	ITA

=== 24 Hours of Le Mans results ===
Year	Team	Co-Drivers	Car	Class	Laps	Pos.	Class Pos.
1933	(France) Raymond Sommer	(France) Raymond Sommer	Alfa Romeo 8C 2300MM	3.0	233	**1st**	**1st**

Sporting positions
Preceded by Pierino Opessi	500cc Italian Motorcycle Champion; 1924	Succeeded by Mario Saetti
Preceded by Jimmie Simpson	350cc European Motorcycle Champion; 1925	Succeeded by Frank Longman
Preceded by Pietro Ghersi	350cc Italian Motorcycle Champion; 1926	Succeeded by Luigi Macchi
Preceded by Giuseppe Campari; Giulio Ramponi	Winner of the Mille Miglia; 1930 with: Battista Guidotti	Succeeded by Rudolf Caracciola; Wilhelm Sebastien
Preceded by Ferdinando Minoia	European Drivers' Champion; 1932	Succeeded by Rudolf Caracciola (1935)
Preceded by Raymond Sommer; Luigi Chinetti	Winner of the 24 Hours of Le Mans; 1933 with: Raymond Sommer	Succeeded by Luigi Chinetti; Philippe Étancelin
Preceded by Baconin Borzacchini; Amedeo Bignami	Winner of the Mille Miglia; 1933 with: Decimo Compagnoni	Succeeded by Achille Varzi; Amedeo Bignami
