= 1946 Turin Grand Prix =

Race details
- Date: 1 September 1946
- Official name: III Gran Premio del Valentino - I Gran Premio di Torino
- Location: Valentino Park; Turin, Italy
- Course: Street circuit
- Course length: 4.489 km (2.789 miles)
- Distance: 60 laps, 269.926 km (167.724 miles)
- Weather: Light rain from lap 30, turning to heavy rain before the finish

Pole position
Driver	(Italy) Giuseppe Farina	Alfa Romeo
- Time: 2:18.6

Fastest lap
Driver	(France) Jean-Pierre Wimille	Alfa Romeo
- Time: 2:22.1

Podium
First	(Italy) Achille Varzi	Alfa Romeo
Second	(France) Jean-Pierre Wimille	Alfa Romeo
Third	(France) Raymond Sommer	Maserati

The 1946 Turin Grand Prix (formally known as the III Gran Premio del Valentino) was a Grand Prix motor race held on 1 September 1946 on a temporary street circuit at Valentino Park in Turin, Italy. It was the first time the event had been held since the end of the Second World War and is also popularly considered to be the first ever Formula One Grand Prix, as the race regulations anticipated the official introduction of the new International Grand Prix Formula on 1 January 1947, which was to be renamed Formula A and later Formula 1.

The race was attended by 120,000–200,000 spectators.

== Background ==
The 1946 Turin Grand Prix was the first Grand Prix to be held in Italy in the post-war era. Given the recentness of the Second World War, the vast majority of the cars on the grid were pre-war voiturette-class racing cars. With the absence of the German manufacturers that dominated the pre-war Grand Prix circuit, the field was instead dominated by the rivalry between fellow Italian manufacturers Alfa Romeo and Maserati.

The Grand Prix was also the motor racing debut of Turin-based Cisitalia, who, despite not qualifying for the race itself, would go on to win the accompanying Coppa Brezzi at the same venue the following Tuesday, with founder Piero Dusio behind the wheel.

=== Technical regulations ===
The race was run to the 1947 Grand Prix Formula technical regulations, which allowed for either 1500cc supercharged engines or 4500cc naturally-aspirated engines. The regulations, while not in force, had been proposed by the Commission Sportive Internationale (CSI) as late as March 1946 and was approved by the Association Internationale des Automobile Clubs Reconnus (AIACR) on 24 June 1946, in the same meeting that officially changed their name to the Fédération Internationale de l'Automobile (FIA). These regulations would remain unchanged throughout the inaugural season of the Formula One World Championship in 1950.

It was widely regarded by contemporary sources that the race would be a test of the new regulations. All the cars that qualified for the race met the 1500cc supercharged specification except for Eugène Chaboud's Delahaye, which ran a 3500cc naturally-aspirated engine in the 4500cc class.

=== Lotteria della Solidarietà Nazionale ===
A unique aspect of this event was its association with the Lotteria della Solidarietà Nazionale (National Solidarity Lottery). A large number of tickets were sold to the public across Italy. From these, twenty winning tickets were drawn and paired with the twenty fastest drivers in practice. The ticket holder paired with the winning driver earned a jackpot of 25 million Lira. The second and third-place pairings won 5 million and 3.85 million Lira respectively, and all twenty drawn ticket holders were guaranteed a consolation prize of 250,000 Lira.

== Qualifying ==
Qualifying took place over the course of the two practice sessions on 30–31 August 1946. Because of the event's association with the Lotteria della Solidarietà Nazionale, only the top twenty qualifiers formed the starting grid.

=== Qualifying classification ===
Pos	No	Driver	Team	Car	Time
1	8	(Italy) Giuseppe Farina	Alfa Corse	Alfa Romeo 158	2:18.6
2	52	(France) Jean-Pierre Wimille	Alfa Corse	Alfa Romeo 158	2:19.0
3	54	(Italy) Carlo Felice Trossi	Alfa Corse	Alfa Romeo 158	2:20.6
4	46	(Italy) Achille Varzi	Alfa Corse	Alfa Romeo 158	2:20.8
5	22	(Italy) Consalvo Sanesi	Alfa Corse	Alfa Romeo 158	2:22.4
6	48	(Italy) Tazio Nuvolari	Scuderia Milano	Maserati 4CL	2:24.6
7	56	(Monaco) Louis Chiron	Ecurie Autosport	Maserati 4CL	2:28.2
8	16	(Italy) Giorgio Pelassa	Scuderia Milano	Maserati 4CL	2:28.8
9	24	(France) Raymond Sommer	Scuderia Milano	Maserati 4CL	2:29.6
10	58	(Italy) Franco Cortese	Scuderia Milano	Maserati 4CL	2:30.6
11	28	(Italy) Arialdo Ruggieri	Scuderia Milano	Maserati 4CL	2:30.8
12	40	(Switzerland) Enrico Platé	Scuderia Milano	Maserati 4CL	2:31.4
13	42	(United Kingdom) Reg Parnell	Private entry	ERA C	2:31.8
14	44	(Italy) Guido Barbieri	Private entry	Maserati 4CL	2:33.2
15	50	(United Kingdom) Peter Whitehead	Private entry	ERA E	2:34.2
16	36	(France) Henri Louveau	Scuderia Milano	Maserati 4CL	2:35.0
17	4	(Italy) Discoride Lanza	Ecurie Tricolore	Maserati 4CM	2:36.6
18	64	(Italy) Emilio Romano	Private entry	Maserati 4CL	2:36.6
19	18	(United Kingdom) Leslie Brooke	Private entry	ERA B	2:38.2
20	10	(France) Eugène Chaboud	Ecurie France	Delahaye 135S	2:39.2
DNQ	2	(France) "Raph"	Ecurie Naphtra Course	Maserati 6CM	2:39.4
DNQ	68	(Switzerland) Ciro Basadonna†	Ecurie Autosport	Maserati 4CL	2:44.2
DNQ	34	(Italy) Piero Dusio	Compagnia Industriale Sportiva Italia	Cisitalia D46	2:45.4
DNQ	6	(United States) Harry Schell	Ecurie Lucy O'Reilly Schell	Maserati 6CM	2:46.8
DNQ	26	(Italy) Piero Taruffi	Compagnia Industriale Sportiva Italia	Cisitalia D46	2:48.6
DNQ	12	(France) Georges Grignard	Ecurie France	Delahaye 135	2:49.2
DNQ	62	(Italy) Luigi "Gigi" Platé	Private entry	Talbot-Darracq 700	3:00.2
DNA	14	(Italy) Secondo Corsi	Private entry	Maserati	-
DNA	20	(Switzerland) Toulo de Graffenried	Ecurie Autosport	Maserati 4CL	-
DNA	30	(United Kingdom) Roger Wormser	Private entry	Maserati 6CM	-
DNA	32	(Switzerland) Ciro Basadonna	Ecurie Autosport	Maserati 4CL	-
DNA	60	(Italy) Gianni Cattina	Private entry	Maserati	-
DNA	66	(Italy) Giacomo Palmieri	Private entry	Maserati 4CL	-
DNA	70	(Netherlands) Eric Verkade	Ecurie Autosport	Maserati 4CL	-

Notes

† – Alternative Driver, car originally entered by Louis Chiron

== Race ==
Almost instantly after the start of the race, polesitter Farina experienced an irreparable transmission failure, while Whitehead managed to get into the lead before problems with his supercharger led to him dropping down the order. This left the Alfas to break away from the pack. Maserati's challenge was not aided by team leader Nuvolari, who, seeming to be hindered due to suspension problems from the start, lost one of his rear wheels on lap 10. Thankfully, he managed to bring the car to a stop without further incident, though the wheel itself ended up in the Po. The race, typical for the time, was one of high attrition; half of the field had retired by the mid-point when the rain began. In the end, the front-runners consisted of Wimille in first and Varzi in second, but still in hot pursuit. It seemed as though Wimille would be able to keep the lead until the end of the race, until lap 50 when the Alfa Romeo team held out a pit board for Wimille reading "1. Varzi; 2. Wimille", dictating the desired finishing order. Wimille then allowed Varzi past to give him the victory. Sommer crossed the line two laps down to take third, and the crowd was very impressed with Chaboud's drive, having started last and finishing fourth, albeit five laps down to the leaders.

While Maserati would go on to win the majority of Grands Prix in 1946, the dominance of Alfa Romeo under the new formula regulations would prove itself consistent as the team would go on to dominate the following years, ultimately resulting in their car winning the first two seasons of the Formula One Championship in an equally dominant fashion.

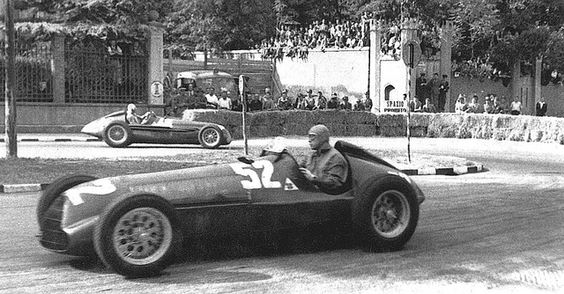
Second place finisher Jean-Pierre Wimille in front of winner Achille Varzi

=== Race classification ===
Pos	No	Driver	Team	Car	Laps	Time/Retired	Grid
1	46	(Italy) Achille Varzi	Alfa Corse	Alfa Romeo 158	60	2:35:45.8	4
2	52	(France) Jean-Pierre Wimille	Alfa Corse	Alfa Romeo 158	60	+0.8	2
3	22	(France) Raymond Sommer	Scuderia Milano	Maserati 4CL	58	+2 Laps	9
4	10	(France) Eugène Chaboud	Ecurie France	Delahaye 135S	55	+5 Laps	20
5	26	(Switzerland) Enrico Platé	Scuderia Milano	Maserati 4CL	55	+5 Laps	12
6	54	(Italy) Carlo Felice Trossi	Alfa Corse	Alfa Romeo 158	51	+9 Laps	3
7	56	(Monaco) Louis Chiron	Ecurie Autosport	Maserati 4CL	50	+10 Laps	7
8	18	(United Kingdom) Leslie Brooke	Private entry	ERA B	50	+10 Laps	19
9	4	(Italy) Discoride Lanza	Ecurie Naphtra Course	Maserati 4CM	48	+12 Laps	17
Ret	44	(Switzerland) Christian Kautz†	Private entry	Maserati 4CL	32	Engine	14
Ret	50	(United Kingdom) Peter Whitehead	Private entry	ERA E	30	Gearbox	15
Ret	36	(France) Henri Louveau	Scuderia Milano	Maserati 4CL	25	Collision	16
Ret	40	(Italy) Franco Cortese	Scuderia Milano	Maserati 4CL	16	Magneto	10
Ret	28	(Italy) Arialdo Ruggieri	Scuderia Milano	Maserati 4CL	11	Supercharger	11
Ret	48	(Italy) Tazio Nuvolari	Scuderia Milano	Maserati 4CL	9	Lost wheel	6
Ret	16	(Italy) Giorgio Pelassa	Scuderia Milano	Maserati 4CL	8	Lost wheel	8
Ret	24	(Italy) Consalvo Sanesi	Alfa Corse	Alfa Romeo 158	6	Ignition	5
Ret	64	(Italy) Emilio Romano	Private entry	Maserati 4CL	2	Ignition	18
Ret	42	(United Kingdom) Reg Parnell	Private entry	ERA C	1	Gearbox	13
Ret	8	(Italy) Giuseppe Farina	Alfa Corse	Alfa Romeo 158	0	Differential	1

Notes

† – Alternative Driver, car originally entered by Guido Barbieri

Grand Prix Race
1946 Grand Prix season
Previous race: 1937 Turin Circuit	Turin Grand Prix	Next race: none
