= 1950 Italian Grand Prix =

← Previous race	Next race →
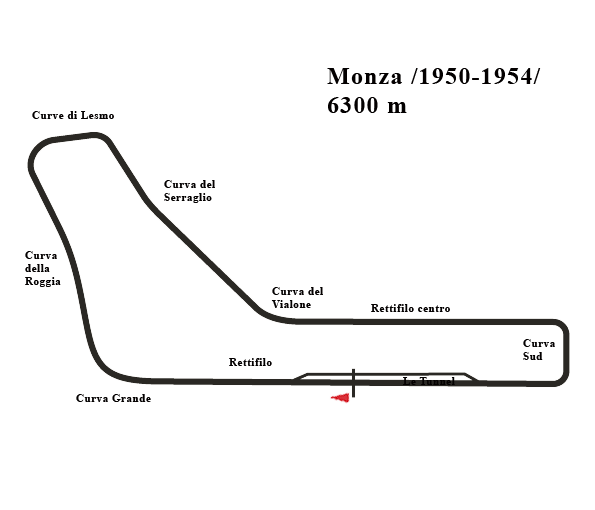

Race details
- Date: 3 September 1950
- Official name: XXI GRAN PREMIO D'ITALIA
- Location: Autodromo Nazionale di Monza, Monza, Italy
- Course: Permanent racing facility
- Course length: 6.300 km (3.915 miles)
- Distance: 80 laps, 504.000 km (313.171 miles)
- Weather: Warm, hot and sunny

Pole position
Driver	(Argentina) Juan Manuel Fangio	Alfa Romeo
- Time: 1:58.6

Fastest lap
Driver	(Argentina) Juan Manuel Fangio	Alfa Romeo
- Time: 2:00.0 on lap 7

Podium
First	(Italy) Nino Farina	Alfa Romeo
Second	(Italy) Dorino Serafini; (Italy) Alberto Ascari	Ferrari
Third	(Italy) Luigi Fagioli	Alfa Romeo

The 1950 Italian Grand Prix was a Formula One motor race held on 3 September 1950 at Autodromo Nazionale di Monza. It was race 7 of 7 in the 1950 World Championship of Drivers. In this race, Nino Farina became the first World Drivers' Champion, and the only driver to win the title in his home country.

== Background ==
=== Championship permutations ===
Following his victory at the preceding French Grand Prix, Juan Manuel Fangio had obtained 26 points, two ahead of teammate Luigi Fagioli and four ahead of another teammate, Giuseppe Farina. Having already finished four times in the points (all second places), Fagioli would only be able to drop six points or not gain at all, while Fangio and Farina had only finished three times. All three of Fangio's finishes were wins.

The championship would have been won by either of the top three drivers in the following manner:

	Fangio would have won if:		
	(Argentina) Juan Manuel Fangio	(Italy) Luigi Fagioli	(Italy) Giuseppe Farina
Pos.	2nd or better	Any position	Any position
Pos.	3rd	Any position	2nd or lower
Pos.	4th	Any position	2nd or lower
Pos.	5th	Any position	2nd or lower
Pos.	lower than 5th + FL	Any position	3rd or lower
Pos.	lower than 5th w/o FL	2nd or lower + FL	3rd or lower

	Fagioli would have won if:		
	(Italy) Luigi Fagioli	(Argentina) Juan Manuel Fangio	(Italy) Giuseppe Farina
Pos.	1st + FL	lower than 5th w/o FL	3rd or lower

	Farina would have won if:		
	(Italy) Giuseppe Farina	(Argentina) Juan Manuel Fangio	(Italy) Luigi Fagioli
Pos.	1st + FL	3rd or lower	Any position
Pos.	1st w/o FL	4th or lower	Any position
Pos.	2nd + FL	5th or lower w/o FL	Any position
Pos.	3rd + FL	lower than 5th w/o FL	Any position

== Entries ==
No	Driver	Entrant	Constructor	Chassis	Engine	Tyre
2	(Belgium) Johnny Claes	Ecurie Belge	Talbot-Lago	Talbot-Lago T26C	Talbot 23CV 4.5 L6	D
4	(Italy) Franco Rol	Officine Alfieri Maserati	Maserati	Maserati 4CLT/48	Maserati 4CLT 1.5 L4s	P
6	(Monaco) Louis Chiron	Officine Alfieri Maserati	Maserati	Maserati 4CLT/48	Maserati 4CLT 1.5 L4s	P
8	(United Kingdom) Peter Whitehead	Peter Whitehead	Ferrari	Ferrari 125	Ferrari 125 F1 1.5 V12s	D
10	(Italy) Nino Farina	Alfa Romeo SpA	Alfa Romeo	Alfa Romeo 159	Alfa Romeo 158 1.5 L8s	P
12	(France) Raymond Sommer	Raymond Sommer	Talbot-Lago	Talbot-Lago T26C	Talbot 23CV 4.5 L6	D
14	(Italy) Giovanni Bracco^{1}	Scuderia Ferrari	Ferrari	Ferrari 125	Ferrari 125 F1 1.5 V12s	P
16	(Italy) Alberto Ascari	Scuderia Ferrari	Ferrari	Ferrari 375	Ferrari 375 F1 4.5 V12	P
18	(Argentina) Juan Manuel Fangio	Alfa Romeo SpA	Alfa Romeo	Alfa Romeo 159	Alfa Romeo 158 1.5 L8s	P
20	(Italy) Luigi de Filippis ^{1}	De Filippis	Maserati	Maserati 4CLT/48	Maserati 4CLT 1.5 L4s	P
22	(Italy) Clemente Biondetti	Clemente Biondetti	Ferrari-Jaguar	Biondetti/166 SC	Jaguar XK 3.4 L6	P
24	(France) Philippe Étancelin	Philippe Étancelin	Talbot-Lago	Talbot-Lago T26C	Talbot 23CV 4.5 L6	D
26	(United Kingdom) Reg Parnell ^{1}	Scuderia Ambrosiana	Maserati	Maserati 4CLT/48	Maserati 4CLT 1.5 L4s	D
28	(West Germany) Paul Pietsch	Paul Pietsch	Maserati	Maserati 4CLT/48	Maserati 4CLT 1.5 L4s	P
30	(Thailand) Prince Bira	Enrico Platé	Maserati	Maserati 4CLT/48	Maserati 4CLT 1.5 L4s	P
32	(United Kingdom) Cuth Harrison	Cuth Harrison	ERA	ERA B	ERA 1.5 L6s	D
34	(Italy) Luigi Platé^{1}	Enrico Platé	Talbot	Talbot 700	Talbot 700 1.5 L8s	D
36	(Italy) Luigi Fagioli	Alfa Romeo SpA	Alfa Romeo	Alfa Romeo 158	Alfa Romeo 158 1.5 L8s	P
38	(Switzerland) Toulo de Graffenried	Enrico Platé	Maserati	Maserati 4CLT/48	Maserati 4CLT 1.5 L4s	P
40	(France) Guy Mairesse	Guy Mairesse	Talbot-Lago	Talbot-Lago T26C	Talbot 23CV 4.5 L6	D
42	(France) Maurice Trintignant	Equipe Gordini	Simca-Gordini	Simca-Gordini T15	Simca-Gordini 15C 1.5 L4s	E
44	(France) Robert Manzon	Equipe Gordini	Simca-Gordini	Simca-Gordini T15	Simca-Gordini 15C 1.5 L4s	E
46	(Italy) Consalvo Sanesi	Alfa Romeo SpA	Alfa Romeo	Alfa Romeo 158	Alfa Romeo 158 1.5 L8s	P
48	(Italy) Dorino Serafini (Note: Dorino Serafini qualified and drove 47 laps of the race in the #48 Ferrari. Alberto Ascari, whose own vehicle had already retired, took over Serafini's car for the remaining 33 laps of the race. They shared the 6 points for second place.)	Scuderia Ferrari	Ferrari	Ferrari 375	Ferrari 375 F1 4.5 V12	P
50	(United Kingdom) David Murray	Scuderia Ambrosiana	Maserati	Maserati 4CLT/48	Maserati 4CLT 1.5 L4s	D
52	(Italy) Felice Bonetto	Scuderia Milano	Milano-Speluzzi	Milano 1	Speluzzi 1.5 L4s	P
56	(France) Pierre Levegh	Pierre Levegh	Talbot-Lago	Talbot-Lago T26C	Talbot 23CV 4.5 L6	D
58	(France) Louis Rosier	Ecurie Rosier	Talbot-Lago	Talbot-Lago T26C	Talbot 23CV 4.5 L6	D
60	(Italy) Piero Taruffi (Note: Piero Taruffi qualified and drove 25 laps of the race in the #60 Alfa Romeo. Juan Manuel Fangio, whose own Alfa had already retired, took over Taruffi's car for a further 9 laps before again being forced to retire.)	Alfa Romeo SpA	Alfa Romeo	Alfa Romeo 158	Alfa Romeo 158 1.5 L8s	P
62	(Italy) Franco Comotti	Scuderia Milano	Maserati-Milano	Maserati 4CLT/50	Milano 1.5 L4s	P
64	(France) Henri Louveau	Ecurie Rosier	Talbot-Lago	Talbot-Lago T26C-GS	Talbot 23CV 4.5 L6	D
66	(Italy) Franco Bordoni ^{1}	Enrico Platé	Talbot	Talbot 700	Talbot 700 1.5 L8s	D

^1 — Giovanni Bracco, Luigi de Filippis, Reg Parnell, Luigi Platé and Franco Bordoni all withdrew from the event prior to practice.

== Race report ==
Ferrari pulled out all the stops to impress at their home circuit, producing a new unsupercharged 4½ litre engine to try to end the Alfa Romeo monopoly. Alberto Ascari used it to achieve second place on the grid to Juan Manuel Fangio's Alfa Romeo 159 and then in the race behind the fast starting Nino Farina (Alfa Romeo 159) before briefly leading. The pace was too punishing for the new car and a porous block broke on lap 20 and the battle returned as usual to the Alfas. Fangio retired twice; once in his own Alfa Romeo 159 and a second time after taking over Piero Taruffi's. Farina led to the finish from Ascari who was now in teammate Dorino Serafini's Ferrari 375 with Luigi Fagioli finishing third in his Alfa Romeo 159. Louis Rosier finish fourth in his Talbot-Lago T26C with Philippe Étancelin fifth in his Lago-Talbot. Étancelin would become the oldest driver to ever score a world championship point with that finish. Only seven cars finished out of the 27 starters and with Farina's win and Fangio's failure to score and Fagioli's third place points removed as his worst scoring finish, Farina became the first recipient of the World Driver's Championship crown.

== Classification ==
=== Qualifying ===
The starting grid of the 1950 Italian Grand Prix at Monza

Pos	No	Driver	Constructor	Time
1	18	(Argentina) Juan Manuel Fangio	Alfa Romeo	1:58.6
2	16	(Italy) Alberto Ascari	Ferrari	1:58.8
3	10	(Italy) Nino Farina	Alfa Romeo	2:00.2
4	46	(Italy) Consalvo Sanesi	Alfa Romeo	2:00.4
5	36	(Italy) Luigi Fagioli	Alfa Romeo	2:04.0
6	48	(Italy) Dorino Serafini	Ferrari	2:05.6
7	60	(Italy) Piero Taruffi	Alfa Romeo	2:05.8
8	12	(France) Raymond Sommer	Talbot-Lago-Talbot	2:08.6
9	4	(Italy) Franco Rol	Maserati	2:10.0
10	44	(France) Robert Manzon	Simca-Gordini	2:12.4
11	40	(France) Guy Mairesse	Talbot-Lago-Talbot	2:13.2
12	42	(France) Maurice Trintignant	Simca-Gordini	2:13.4
13	58	(France) Louis Rosier	Talbot-Lago-Talbot	2:13.4
14	64	(France) Henri Louveau	Talbot-Lago-Talbot	2:13.8
15	30	(Thailand) Prince Bira	Maserati	2:14.0
16	24	(France) Philippe Étancelin	Talbot-Lago-Talbot	2:14.4
17	38	(Switzerland) Toulo de Graffenried	Maserati	2:14.4
18	8	(United Kingdom) Peter Whitehead	Ferrari	2:16.2
19	6	(Monaco) Louis Chiron	Maserati	2:17.2
20	56	(France) Pierre Levegh	Talbot-Lago-Talbot	2:17.2
21	32	(United Kingdom) Cuth Harrison	ERA	2:18.4
22	2	(Belgium) Johnny Claes	Talbot-Lago-Talbot	2:18.6
23	52	(Italy) Felice Bonetto	Milano-Speluzzi	2:19.8
24	50	(United Kingdom) David Murray	Maserati	2:22.0
25	22	(Italy) Clemente Biondetti	Ferrari-Jaguar	2:30.6
26	62	(Italy) Franco Comotti	Maserati-Milano	2:33.6
27	28	(Germany) Paul Pietsch	Maserati	3:00.2
DNA	14	(Italy) Giovanni Bracco	Ferrari	–
DNA	26	(United Kingdom) Reg Parnell	Maserati	–
DNA	34	(Italy) Luigi Platé	Talbot	–

=== Race ===
Pos	No	Driver	Constructor	Laps	Time/Retired	Grid	Points
1	10	(Italy) Nino Farina	Alfa Romeo	80	2:51:17.4	3	8
2	48	(Italy) Alberto Ascari	Ferrari	80	+ 1:18.6	6	3
2	48	(Italy) Dorino Serafini	Ferrari	80	+ 1:18.6	6	3
3	36	(Italy) Luigi Fagioli	Alfa Romeo	80	+ 1:35.6	5	4
4	58	(France) Louis Rosier	Talbot-Lago-Talbot	75	+ 5 Laps	13	3
5	24	(France) Philippe Étancelin	Talbot-Lago-Talbot	75	+ 5 Laps	16	2
6	38	(Switzerland) Toulo de Graffenried	Maserati	72	+ 8 Laps	17	
7	8	(United Kingdom) Peter Whitehead	Ferrari	72	+ 8 Laps	18	
Ret	50	(United Kingdom) David Murray	Maserati	56	Gearbox	24	
Ret	32	(United Kingdom) Cuth Harrison	ERA	51	Radiator	21	
Ret	12	(France) Raymond Sommer	Talbot-Lago-Talbot	48	Gearbox	8	
Ret	40	(France) Guy Mairesse	Talbot-Lago-Talbot	42	Oil Pipe	11	
Ret	4	(Italy) Franco Rol	Maserati	39	Retirement	9	
Ret	60	(Italy) Piero Taruffi	Alfa Romeo	34	Engine	7	
Ret	60	(Argentina) Juan Manuel Fangio	Alfa Romeo	34	Engine	7	
Ret	56	(France) Pierre Levegh	Talbot-Lago-Talbot	29	Gearbox	20	
Ret	18	(Argentina) Juan Manuel Fangio	Alfa Romeo	23	Gearbox	1	1^{1}
Ret	2	(Belgium) Johnny Claes	Talbot-Lago-Talbot	22	Overheating	22	
Ret	16	(Italy) Alberto Ascari	Ferrari	21	Engine	2	
Ret	22	(Italy) Clemente Biondetti	Ferrari-Jaguar	17	Engine	25	
Ret	64	(France) Henri Louveau	Talbot-Lago-Talbot	16	Brakes	14	
Ret	62	(Italy) Franco Comotti	Maserati-Milano	15	Retirement	26	
Ret	42	(France) Maurice Trintignant	Simca-Gordini	13	Water Pipe	12	
Ret	6	(Monaco) Louis Chiron	Maserati	13	Oil Pressure	19	
Ret	46	(Italy) Consalvo Sanesi	Alfa Romeo	11	Engine	4	
Ret	44	(France) Robert Manzon	Simca-Gordini	7	Transmission	10	
Ret	30	(Thailand) Prince Bira	Maserati	1	Engine	15	
Ret	28	(Germany) Paul Pietsch	Maserati	0	Engine	27	
DNS	52	(Italy) Felice Bonetto	Milano-Speluzzi	0	Non Starter	23	

Notes

- ^1 – 1 point for fastest lap

== Final Championship standings ==
- Bold text and a * indicates the World Champion.

Drivers' Championship standings

	Pos	Driver	Points
2	1	(Italy) Nino Farina*	30
1	2	(Argentina) Juan Manuel Fangio	27
1	3	(Italy) Luigi Fagioli	24 (28)
	4	(France) Louis Rosier	13
1	5	(Italy) Alberto Ascari	11

- Note: Only the top five positions are listed. Only the best 4 results counted towards the Championship. Numbers without parentheses are Championship points; numbers in parentheses are total points scored.

== Notes ==
Previous race: 1950 French Grand Prix	FIA Formula One World Championship; 1950 season	Next race: 1951 Swiss Grand Prix
Previous race: 1949 Italian Grand Prix	Italian Grand Prix	Next race: 1951 Italian Grand Prix
