= 1951 Belgian Grand Prix =

← Previous race	Next race →
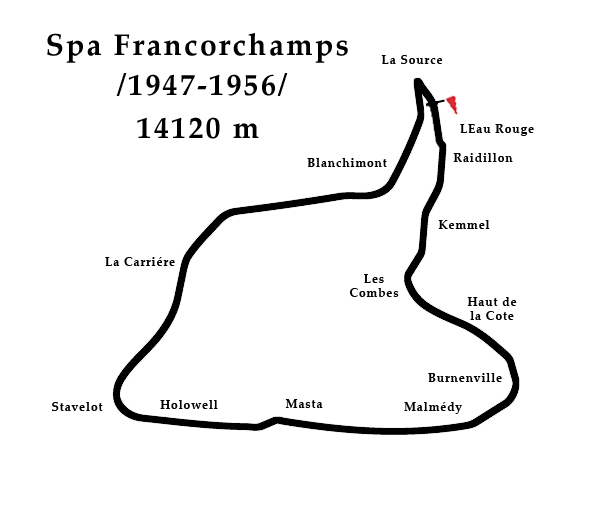

Race details
- Date: 17 June 1951
- Official name: XIII Grand Prix de Belgique
- Location: Spa-Francorchamps, Spa, Belgium
- Course: Grand Prix Circuit
- Course length: 14.12 km (8.774 miles)
- Distance: 36 laps, 508.320 km (315.864 miles)
- Weather: Sunny, Mild, Dry

Pole position
Driver	(Argentina) Juan Manuel Fangio	Alfa Romeo
- Time: 4:25.0

Fastest lap
Driver	(Argentina) Juan Manuel Fangio	Alfa Romeo
- Time: 4:22.1 on lap 10

Podium
First	(Italy) Nino Farina	Alfa Romeo
Second	(Italy) Alberto Ascari	Scuderia Ferrari
Third	(Italy) Luigi Villoresi	Scuderia Ferrari

The 1951 Belgian Grand Prix was a Formula One motor race held on 17 June 1951 at Circuit de Spa-Francorchamps. It was race 3 of 8 in the 1951 World Championship of Drivers

== Report ==
Despite there being just 13 starters, representing three makes of car, the race attracted a record crowd. There were a further three entries, including two Maseratis, which did not attend the event. Juan Manuel Fangio had a new suspension with special wheels, which had to be concave to make room for the brake drums. These proved an expensive novelty. At his first pit stop, they jammed and his stop lasted over 14 minutes. Nino Farina's Alfa Romeo dominated, holding off the Ferraris of Alberto Ascari and Luigi Villoresi. A quick stop of 39 seconds for wheel change and refuelling preserved his lead until the finish.

This would eventually prove to be the only Grand Prix in Fangio's entire Formula 1 career, barring retirements, that he finished outside of the top four. He scored a point for posting the fastest lap of the race, which meant that despite having ended up in ninth place (at the time, only the top five finishers scored points, alongside the holder of the fastest lap, regardless of position), he kept his record of scoring points towards the World Championship in 100% of the Grands Prix in which he saw the chequered flag.

== Entries ==
No	Driver	Entrant	Constructor	Chassis	Engine	Tyre
2	(Argentina) Juan Manuel Fangio	Alfa Romeo SpA	Alfa Romeo	Alfa Romeo 159B	Alfa Romeo 1.5 L8s	P
4	(Italy) Nino Farina	Alfa Romeo SpA	Alfa Romeo	Alfa Romeo 159A	Alfa Romeo 1.5 L8s	P
6	(Italy) Consalvo Sanesi	Alfa Romeo SpA	Alfa Romeo	Alfa Romeo 159	Alfa Romeo 1.5 L8s	P
8	(Italy) Alberto Ascari	Scuderia Ferrari	Ferrari	Ferrari 375	Ferrari Type 375 4.5 V12	P
10	(Italy) Luigi Villoresi	Scuderia Ferrari	Ferrari	Ferrari 375	Ferrari Type 375 4.5 V12	P
12	(Italy) Piero Taruffi	Scuderia Ferrari	Ferrari	Ferrari 375	Ferrari Type 375 4.5 V12	P
14	(France) Louis Rosier	Ecurie Rosier	Talbot-Lago	Talbot-Lago T26C-DA	Talbot 23CV 4.5 L6	D
16	(Belgium) Johnny Claes	Ecurie Belge	Talbot-Lago	Talbot-Lago T26C-DA	Talbot 23CV 4.5 L6	D
18	(Monaco) Louis Chiron	Ecurie Rosier	Talbot-Lago	Talbot-Lago T26C	Talbot 23CV 4.5 L6	D
20	(France) Philippe Étancelin	Philippe Étancelin	Talbot-Lago	Talbot-Lago T26C-DA	Talbot 23CV 4.5 L6	D
22	(France) Yves Giraud-Cabantous	Yves Giraud-Cabantous	Talbot-Lago	Talbot-Lago T26C	Talbot 23CV 4.5 L6	D
24	(Belgium) André Pilette	Ecurie Belge	Talbot-Lago	Talbot-Lago T26C	Talbot 23CV 4.5 L6	E
26	(France) Pierre Levegh	Pierre Levegh	Talbot-Lago	Talbot-Lago T26C	Talbot 23CV 4.5 L6	D
28	(Thailand) Prince Bira	Ecurie Siam	Maserati-OSCA	Maserati 4CLT-48	OSCA V12	P
30	(Argentina) José Froilán González	Enrico Platé	Maserati	Maserati 4CLT-48	Maserati 4 CL 1.5 L4s	P
32	(United Kingdom) Reg Parnell	G. A. Vandervell	Ferrari	Ferrari 375 tw	Ferrari Type 375 4.5 V12	P

== Classification ==
=== Qualifying ===
Pos	No	Driver	Constructor	Time
1	2	(Argentina) Juan Manuel Fangio	Alfa Romeo	4:25
2	4	(Italy) Nino Farina	Alfa Romeo	4:28
3	10	(Italy) Luigi Villoresi	Ferrari	4:29
4	8	(Italy) Alberto Ascari	Ferrari	4:30
5	12	(Italy) Piero Taruffi	Ferrari	4:32
6	6	(Italy) Consalvo Sanesi	Alfa Romeo	4:36
7	14	(France) Louis Rosier	Talbot-Lago-Talbot	4:45
8	22	(France) Yves Giraud-Cabantous	Talbot-Lago-Talbot	4:52
9	18	(Monaco) Louis Chiron	Talbot-Lago-Talbot	5:01
10	20	(France) Philippe Étancelin	Talbot-Lago-Talbot	5:04
11	16	(Belgium) Johnny Claes	Talbot-Lago-Talbot	5:09
12	24	(Belgium) André Pilette	Talbot-Lago-Talbot	5:16
13	26	(France) Pierre Levegh	Talbot-Lago-Talbot	5:17
DNA	28	(Thailand) Prince Bira	Maserati	–
DNA	30	(Argentina) José Froilán González	Maserati	–
DNA	32	(United Kingdom) Reg Parnell	Ferrari	–

=== Race ===
Pos	No	Driver	Constructor	Laps	Time/Retired	Grid	Points
1	4	(Italy) Nino Farina	Alfa Romeo	36	2:45:46.2	2	8
2	8	(Italy) Alberto Ascari	Ferrari	36	+ 2:51.0	4	6
3	10	(Italy) Luigi Villoresi	Ferrari	36	+ 4:21.9	3	4
4	14	(France) Louis Rosier	Talbot-Lago-Talbot	34	+ 2 Laps	7	3
5	22	(France) Yves Giraud-Cabantous	Talbot-Lago-Talbot	34	+ 2 Laps	8	2
6	24	(Belgium) André Pilette	Talbot-Lago-Talbot	33	+ 3 Laps	12	
7	16	(Belgium) Johnny Claes	Talbot-Lago-Talbot	33	+ 3 Laps	11	
8	26	(France) Pierre Levegh	Talbot-Lago-Talbot	32	+ 4 Laps	13	
9	2	(Argentina) Juan Manuel Fangio	Alfa Romeo	32	+ 4 Laps	1	1^{1}
Ret	18	(Monaco) Louis Chiron	Talbot-Lago-Talbot	28	Engine	9	
Ret	6	(Italy) Consalvo Sanesi	Alfa Romeo	11	Radiator	6	
Ret	12	(Italy) Piero Taruffi	Ferrari	8	Transmission	5	
Ret	20	(France) Philippe Étancelin	Talbot-Lago-Talbot	0	Transmission	10	

Notes

- ^1 – 1 point for fastest lap

== Championship standings after the race ==
Drivers' Championship standings

	Pos	Driver	Points
4	1	(Italy) Nino Farina	12
1	2	(Argentina) Juan Manuel Fangio	10
1	3	(United States) Lee Wallard	9
8	4	(Italy) Alberto Ascari	6
2	5	(Italy) Piero Taruffi	6

- Note: Only the top five positions are listed. Only the best 4 results counted towards the Championship.

Previous race: 1951 Indianapolis 500	FIA Formula One World Championship; 1951 season	Next race: 1951 French Grand Prix
Previous race: 1950 Belgian Grand Prix	Belgian Grand Prix	Next race: 1952 Belgian Grand Prix
