= Sanesi =

Sanesi is an Italian surname. Notable people with the surname include:

- Consalvo Sanesi (1911–1998), Italian racecar driver
- Gaia Sanesi (born 1992), Italian tennis player
