= Luigi Platé =

Italian racing driver (1894–1975)

Luigi "Gigi" Platé (3 September 1894 – 16 December 1975) was an Italian racing driver.

== Career ==
Platé made his Grand Prix debut in the 1925 Italian Grand Prix, driving a voiturette class Chiribiri 12/16, but retired on lap 13 due to mechanical failure. Platé also entered in some non-official/non-championship races in the 1920s and 1930s.

Platé also made an unsuccessful Formula One entry in 1950 Italian Grand Prix, to drive a Talbot 700, but he did not appear in the race weekend. He could have become the second oldest driver to enter a Grand Prix if he did (at the age of 56; the record is currently held by Louis Chiron, who entered in 1958 Monaco Grand Prix at age 58 years and 288 days.)

Luigi Platé and Enrico Platé (a younger cousin) had a collection of cars over the years and had a racing team (Scuderia Platé) that ran a variety of cars sporadically.

== Formula One World Championship results ==
(key) (Races in bold indicate pole position; Races in italics indicate fastest lap)

Year	Entrant	Chassis	Engine	1	2	3	4	5	6	7	WDC	Points
1950	Enrico Platé	Talbot-Lago 700	Talbot 23CV 4.5 L6	GBR	MON	500	SUI	BEL	FRA	ITA; DNA	NC	0
