= Alfa Romeo 158/159 Alfetta =

Racing automobile

Alfa Romeo 158, 159, 159A, 159B, 159M
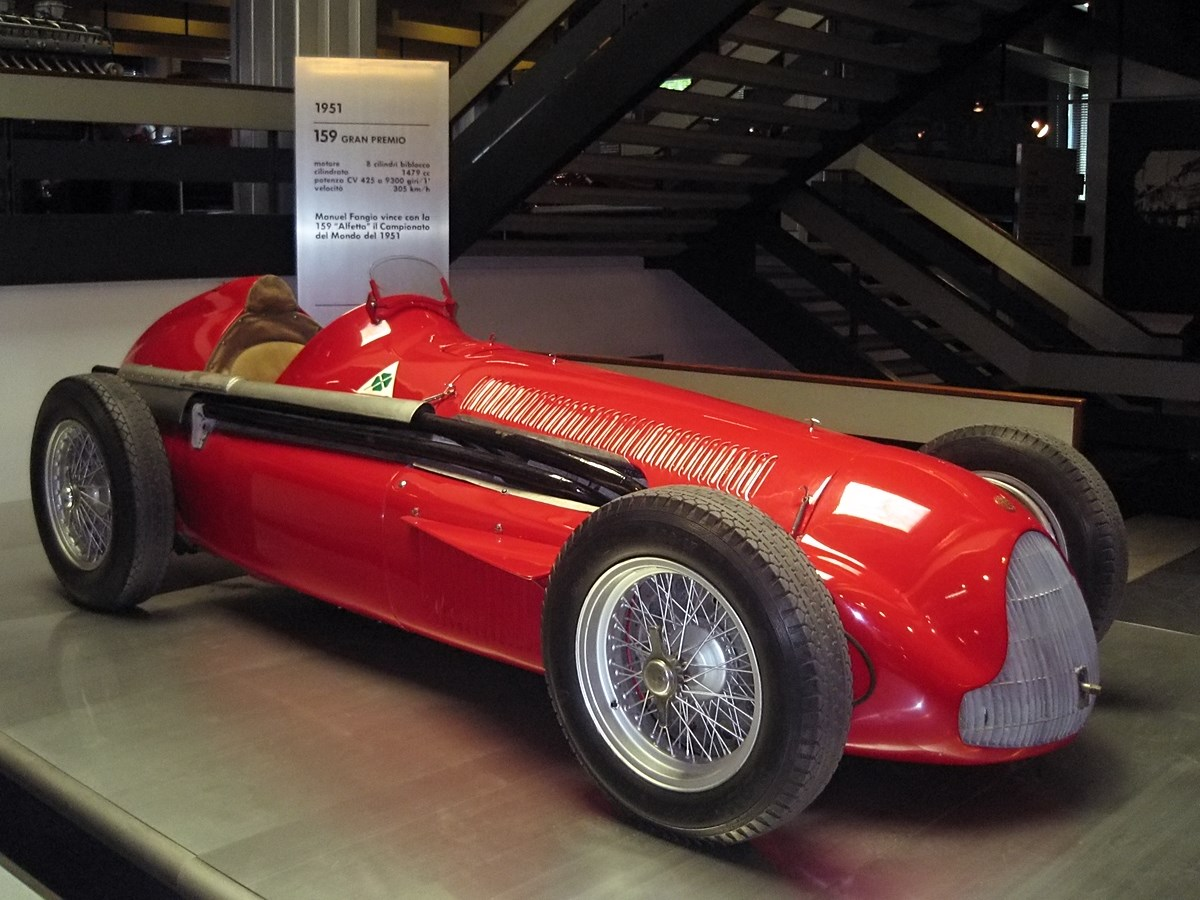
- 1951 Alfa Romeo 159
- Category: Voiturette (1938–1947); Formula One (1947–1951)
- Constructor: Alfa Romeo
- Designer: Gioacchino Colombo
- Predecessor: Alfa Romeo Tipo 512
- Successor: Alfa Special

Technical specifications
- Chassis: Single-seater, tubular frame
- Suspension (front): Trailing arm, transverse leaf springs, hydraulic dampers
- Suspension (rear): Swing axle*, transverse leaf spring, hydraulic dampers *De-Dion-axle was one of the last modifications 1951.
- Length: 4,280 millimetres (169 in)
- Width: 1,473 millimetres (58.0 in)
- Height: 1,164 millimetres (45.8 in)
- Axle track: 1,250 millimetres (49 in) (Both Front and Rear)
- Wheelbase: 2,502 millimetres (98.5 in)
- Engine: Alfa Romeo 158/159 straight-8, Roots-type supercharger**,
- Transmission: Alfa 5-speed manual
- Fuel: Shell (98.5% methanol, 1% Castor oil, 0.5% water)
- Tyres: Pirelli

Competition history
- Notable entrants: Alfa Romeo SpA
- Notable drivers: Jean-Pierre Wimille; Giuseppe Farina; Juan Manuel Fangio; Luigi Fagioli
- Debut: 1938 Coppa Ciano Junior (158); 1951 BRDC International Trophy (159)
Races	Wins	Poles	F/Laps
41 (GP); 13 (F1)	37 (GP); 10 (F1)	10 (F1)	13 (F1)
- Constructors' Championships: Not applicable before 1958
- Drivers' Championships: 2 (1950 – Giuseppe Farina; 1951 – Juan Manuel Fangio)

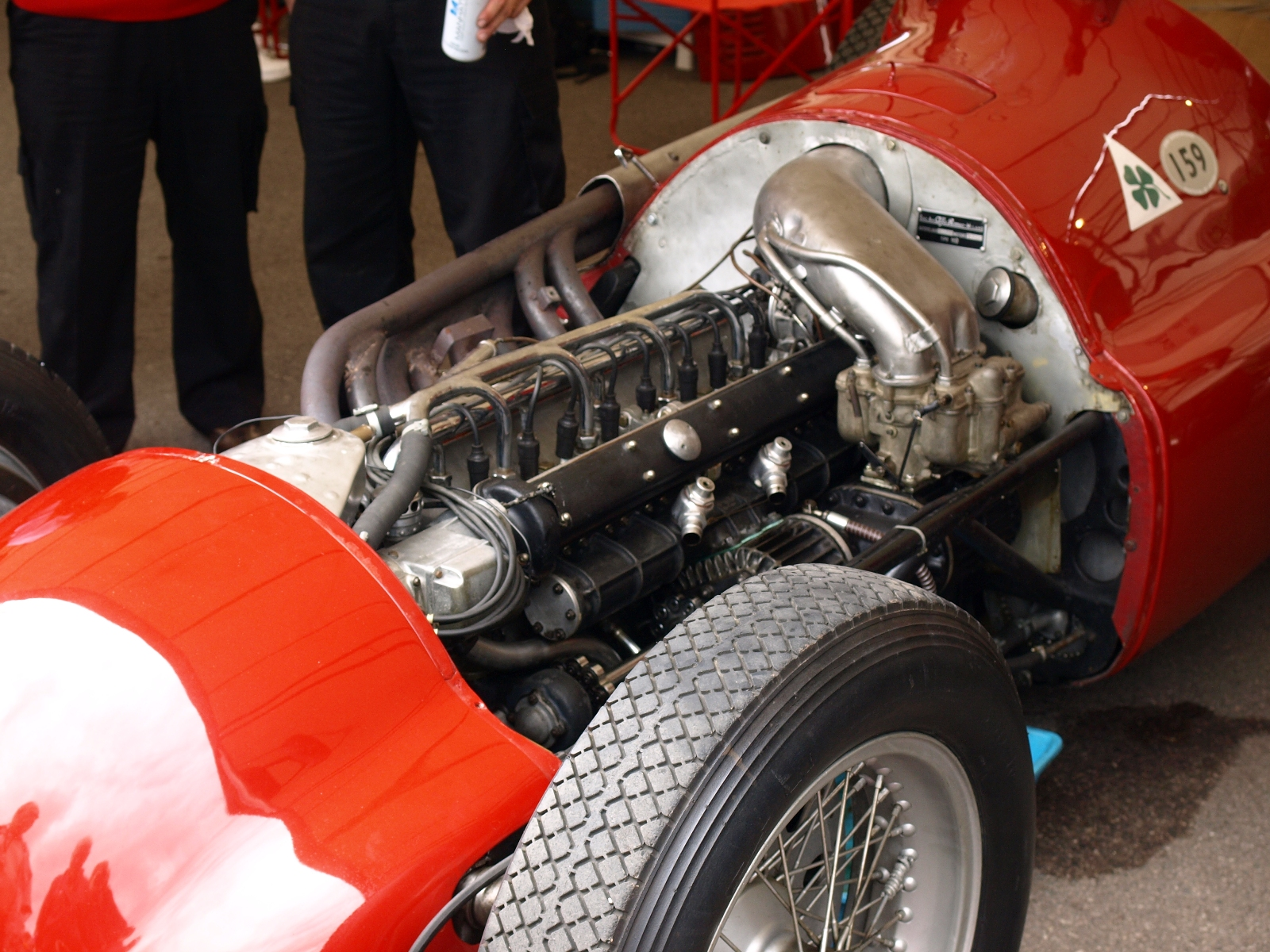
The 1.5L supercharged straight-8 159 engine.

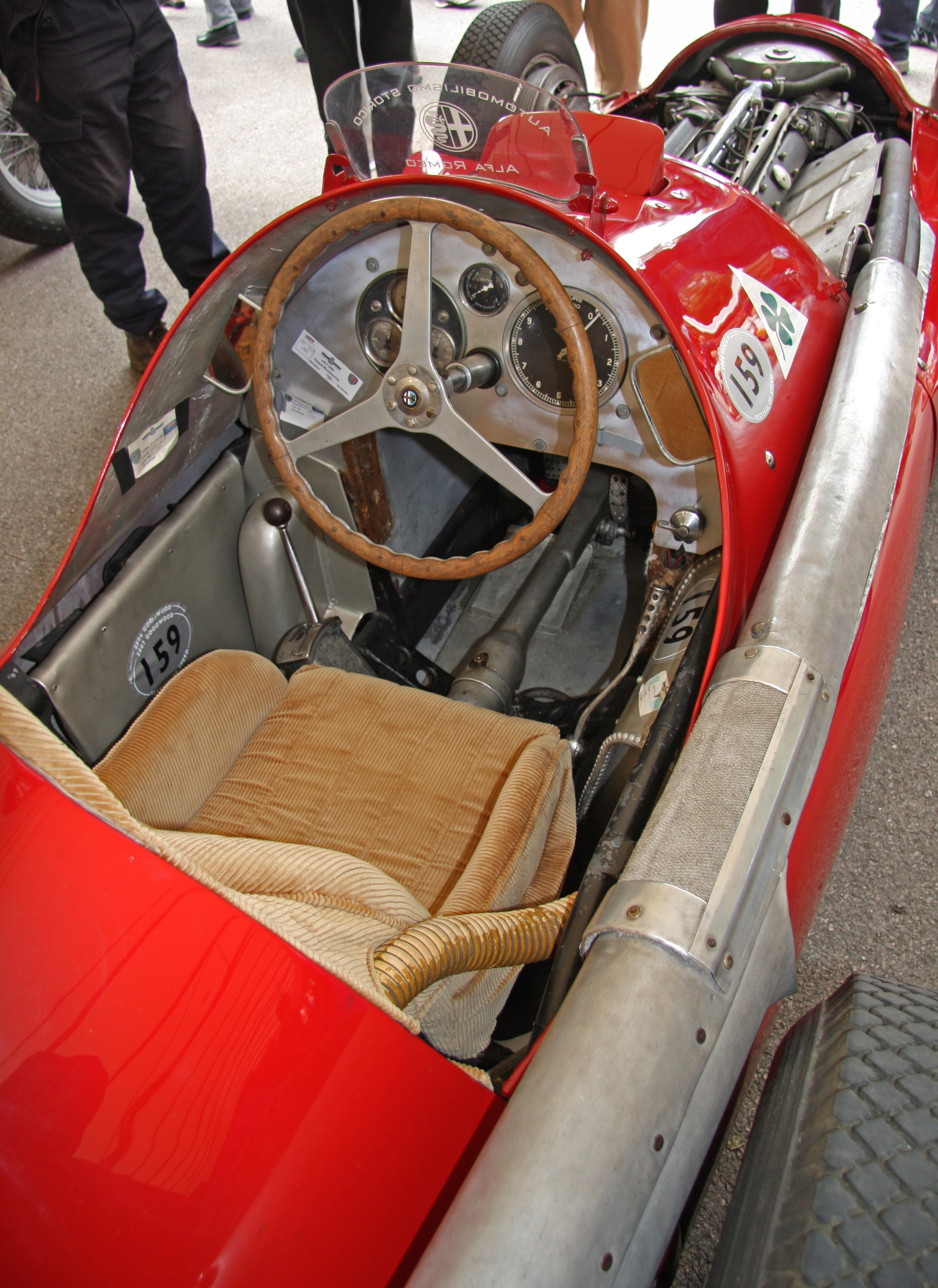
Cockpit.

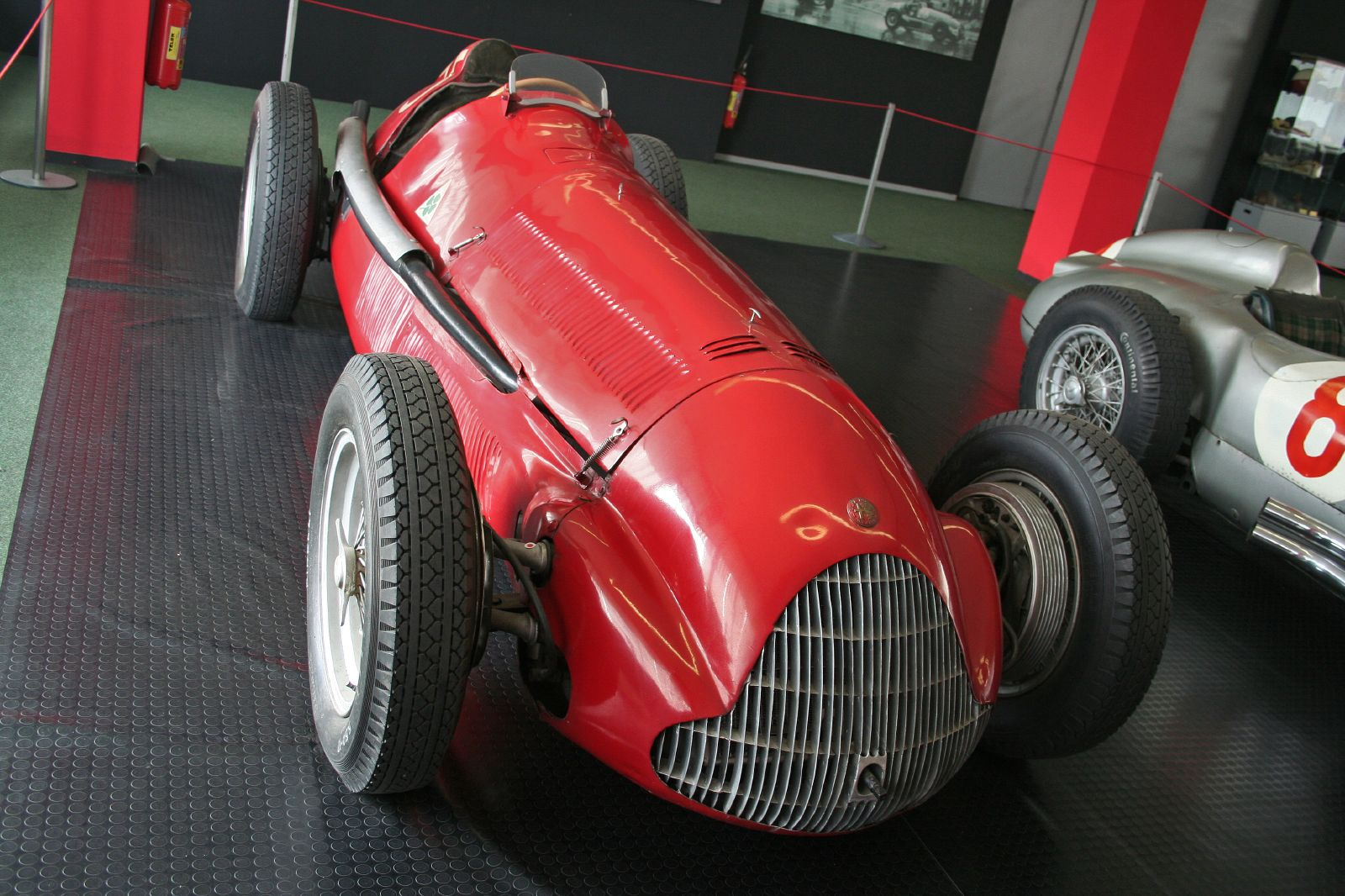
Alfa Romeo159 (1951)

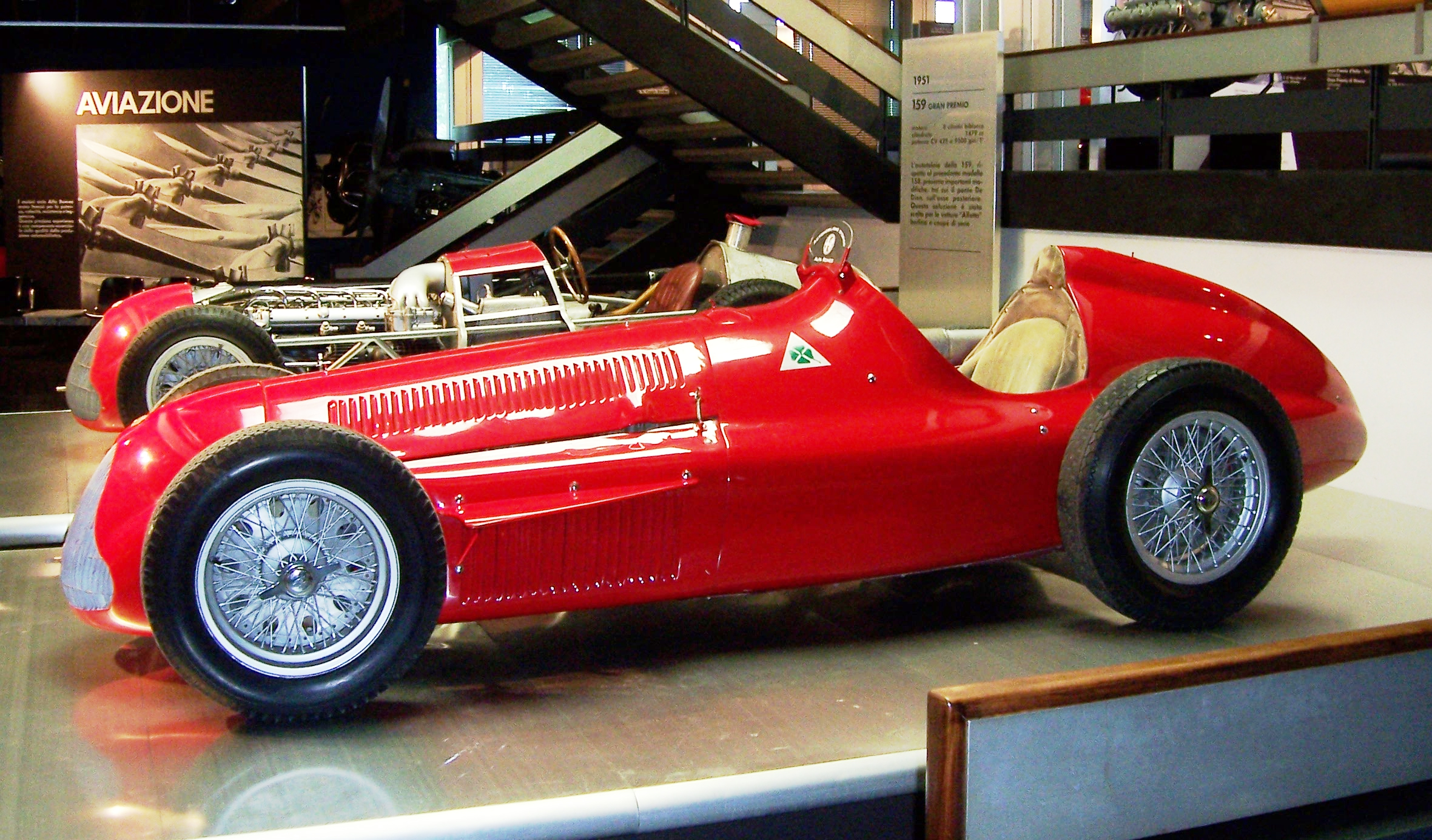
Alfa Romeo Alfetta 159, Museo Storico Alfa Romeo in Arese

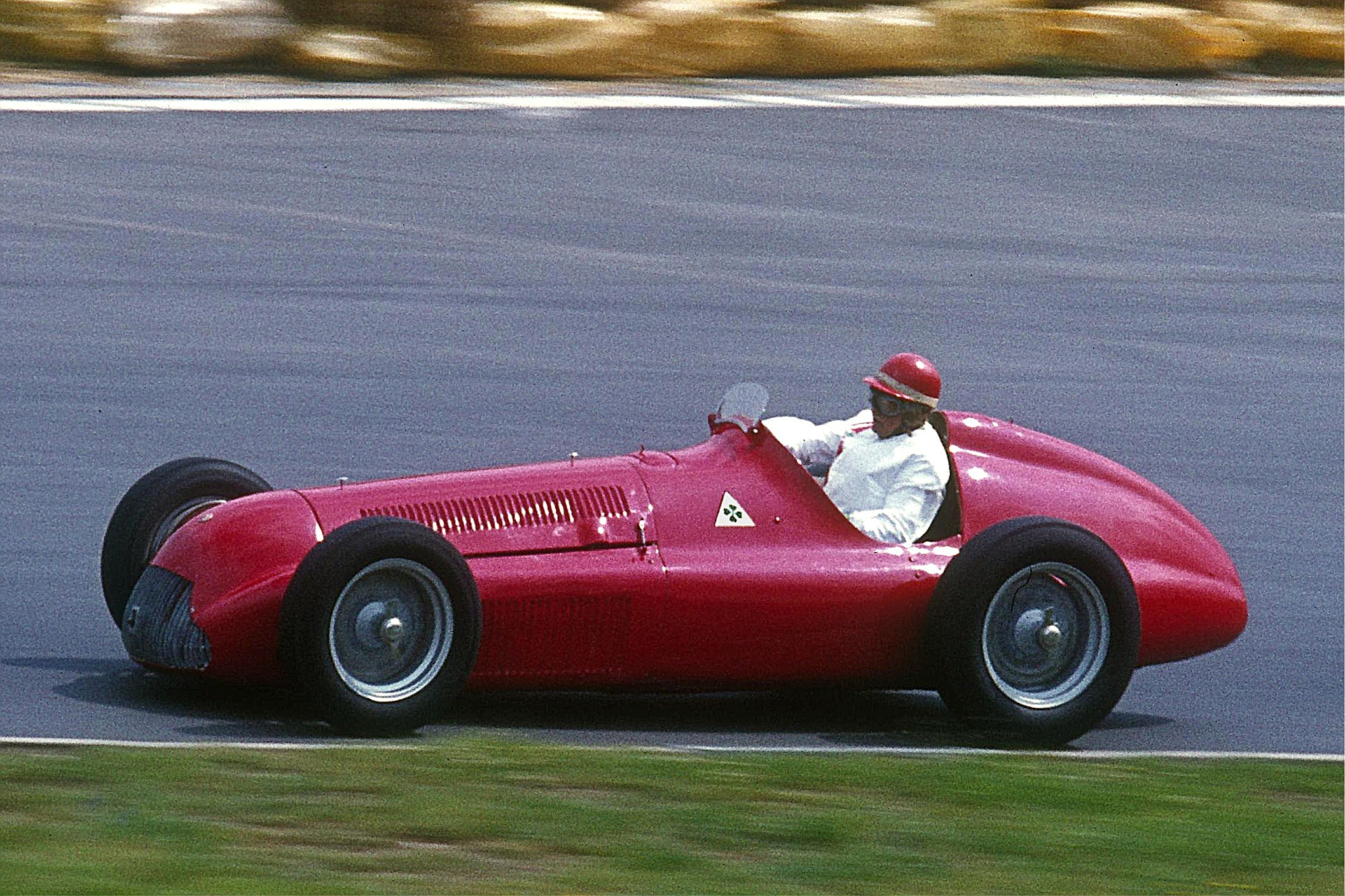
Alfa Romeo 159 at Nürburgring.

The Alfa Romeo 158/159, also known as the Alfetta (Little Alfa in Italian), is a Grand Prix racing car produced by Italian manufacturer Alfa Romeo. It is one of the most successful racing cars ever; the 158 and its derivative, the 159, took 47 wins from 54 Grands Prix entered. It was originally developed for the pre-World War II voiturette formula (1937) and has a 1.5-litre straight-8 supercharged engine. Following World War II, the car was eligible for the new Formula One introduced in 1947. In the hands of drivers such as Nino Farina, Juan Manuel Fangio and Luigi Fagioli, it dominated the first two seasons of the World Championship of Drivers.

== Overview ==
The first version of this successful racing car, the 158, was made during 1937/1938. The main responsibility for engineering was given to Gioacchino Colombo.

The car's name refers to its 1.5-litre engine and eight cylinders. The voiturette class was for racing cars with 1.5-litre engines, standing in the same relation to the top 'Grand Prix' formula (usually for 3-litre engines) as the Formula Two does to Formula One today. Alfa's 3-litre racing cars in 1938 and 1939 were the Tipo 308, 312 and 316.

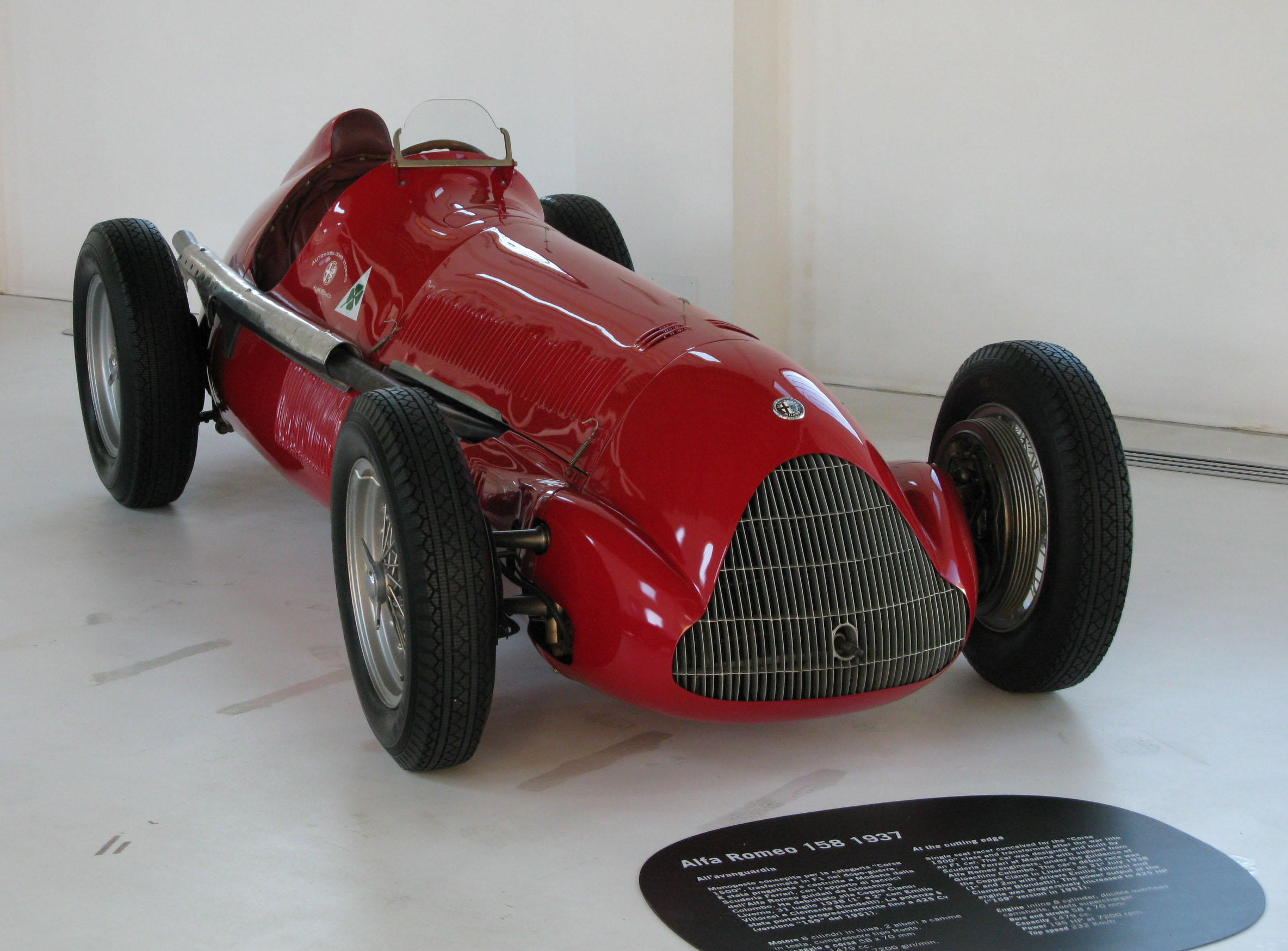
Alfa Romeo 158

The 158 debuted with the works Alfa Corse team at the Coppa Ciano Junior in August 1938 at Livorno, Italy, where Emilio Villoresi took the car's first victory. At that time the 1479.56 cc (58.0 x 70.0 mm) engine produced around 200 bhp (150 kW) at 7000 rpm. with the help of a single-stage Roots blower. More success came at the Coppa Acerbo, Coppa Ciano and Tripoli Grand Prix in May 1940. Soon World War II stopped development of the car for six years. After the war the engine was developed further to push out 254 bhp (189 kW) in 1946.

In 1947, the Alfetta was put back into service. The new rules allowed 1500 cc supercharged and 4500 cc naturally aspirated engines. The 158 was modified again, this time to produce over 300 bhp (220 kW) and was denoted as Tipo 158/47. The car made a tragic debut in the 1948 Swiss Grand Prix where Achille Varzi lost control of his car and was killed. Another loss for the team came in practice for the 1949 Buenos Aires Grand Prix, where Jean-Pierre Wimille was killed in an accident (driving with Simca-Gordini).

In 1950, the 158 was eligible for the new World Championship of Drivers. The car won every race in which it competed during that first season of Formula One; it was incredible that a car which had originated in 1938 was so victorious, most likely because all the other constructors (as few as there were) had less money to build and develop their cars and the Alfa had so much development time. The Alfa Romeo team included talented drivers such as Giuseppe "Nino" Farina and Juan Manuel Fangio, the latter of whom later won the World Drivers' Championship five times.

At the end of the 1950 season, a further updated version known as the 159 was produced, which was used for the 1951 season. This version had reworked rear suspension, the old swing axle was replaced with a De-Dion axle and the engine produced around 420 bhp (313 kW) at 9600 rpm. The 159 had top speed of 305 kilometres per hour (190 mph) and it weighed 710 kilograms (1,570 lb). In order to achieve this power however, the simplistically designed engine was fitted with larger superchargers over time. This fact, combined with the rich mixture required to burn methanol in the engine resulted in extremely poor fuel economy - the 159 achieved 1.5 miles per imperial gallon (190 litres per 100 kilometres; 1.2 miles per US gallon), compared to the Talbot-Lagos of the time, which delivered 9 miles per imperial gallon (31 litres per 100 kilometres; 7.5 miles per US gallon). The 1951 British Grand Prix at Silverstone was the first Formula One Grand Prix not won by an Alfa primarily because Fangio and Farina both had to stop twice simply to re-fuel their cars – and the Ferrari of José Froilán González did better on fuel and would go on to win the race, with Fangio second. Still, the Alfa had the edge on performance and with wins in Switzerland, France and Spain, Fangio won his first of five championships that year. For their second-to-last World Championship race (until 1979), the Italian Grand Prix at Monza, Alfa Romeo introduced a new evolution version known as the 159M, the "M" standing for Maggiorata (lit. "busty woman").

After an unsuccessful bid by Alfa Romeo to obtain government assistance to meet development costs, the team announced their retirement from Grand Prix racing at the end of 1951 (leaving the development of the 2.5-litre Alfa Romeo 160). This, combined with problems for other Formula One teams lead to a decree by the FIA that all Grand Prix races counting towards the World Championship of Drivers in 1952 and 1953 would be for cars complying with Formula Two rather than Formula One.

== Technical data ==
Technical data	158/39	158/50	159
Engine:	Front mounted 8-cylinder in-line engine
Displacement:	1,479 cc (90.3 cu in; 1.479 L)
Bore x stroke:	58 mm × 70 mm (2.3 in × 2.8 in)
Max power at rpm:	225 bhp (228 PS; 168 kW) at 7 500 rpm	350 bhp (350 PS; 260 kW) at 8 500 rpm	429 bhp (435 PS; 320 kW) at 9 300 rpm
Max Torque at rpm:	229 N⋅m (169 lb⋅ft) at 7 000 rpm	390 N⋅m (290 lb⋅ft) at 4 500 rpm	620 N⋅m (460 lb⋅ft) at 5 300 rpm
Valve control:	2 overhead Camshaft, 2 valves per cylinder
Induction:	Roots compressor	2 Roots compressors
Gearbox:	4-speed manual, transaxle
suspension front:	Double longitudinal links, transverse leaf springs, hydraulic shock absorbers
suspension rear:	Pendulum axle		De Dion axle
Rear suspension:	Transverse leaf springs, hydraulic shock absorbers
Brakes:	Hydraulic drum brakes
Wheelbase:	2,502 mm (98.5 in)
Dry weight:	630 kg (1,390 lb)	700 kg (1,500 lb)	710 kg (1,570 lb)

== Race victories ==
Date	Type	Race	Location	Class	Driver
August 7, 1938	158	Coppa Ciano	Livorno	Voiturette	Emilio Villoresi
September 11, 1938	158	Milan Grand Prix	Monza	Voiturette	Emilio Villoresi
July 30, 1939	158	Coppa Ciano	Livorno	Voiturette	Giuseppe Farina
August 13, 1939	158	Coppa Acerbo	Pescara	Voiturette	Clemente Biondetti
August 20, 1939	158	Swiss Grand Prix	Bremgarten	Voiturette	Giuseppe Farina
May 12, 1940	158	Tripoli Grand Prix	Libya	Voiturette	Giuseppe Farina
July 21, 1946	158	Grand Prix of Nations	Geneva	-	Giuseppe Farina
September 1, 1946	158	Valentino Grand Prix	Turin, Valentino Park	non-Champ. F1	Achille Varzi
September 30, 1946	158	Milan Grand Prix	Milan, Sempione Park	-	Carlo Felice Trossi
June 8, 1947	158	Swiss Grand Prix	Bremgarten	-	Jean-Pierre Wimille
June 29, 1947	158	European Grand Prix	Spa	-	Jean-Pierre Wimille
July 13, 1947	158	Bari Grand Prix	Bari	-	Achille Varzi
September 7, 1947	158	Italian Grand Prix	Milan, Sempione Park	-	Carlo Felice Trossi
July 4, 1948	158	Swiss Grand Prix	Bremgarten	-	Carlo Felice Trossi
July 18, 1948	158	French Grand Prix	Reims	-	Jean-Pierre Wimille
September 5, 1948	158	Italian Grand Prix	Turin, Valentino Park	-	Jean-Pierre Wimille
October 17, 1948	158	Autodrome Grand Prix	Monza	-	Jean-Pierre Wimille
April 16, 1950	158	San Remo Grand Prix	Ospedaletti	-	Juan Manuel Fangio
May 13, 1950	158	European Grand Prix	Silverstone	Formula One	Giuseppe Farina
May 21, 1950	158	Monaco Grand Prix	Monaco	Formula One	Juan Manuel Fangio
June 4, 1950	158	Swiss Grand Prix	Bremgarten	Formula One	Giuseppe Farina
June 18, 1950	158	Belgian Grand Prix	Spa	Formula One	Juan Manuel Fangio
July 2, 1950	158	French Grand Prix	Reims	Formula One	Juan Manuel Fangio
July 9, 1950	158	Bari Grand Prix	Bari	-	Giuseppe Farina
July 30, 1950	158	Grand Prix of Nations	Geneva	-	Juan Manuel Fangio
August 15, 1950	158	Coppa Acerbo	Pescara	-	Juan Manuel Fangio
August 26, 1950	158	International Trophy	Silverstone	non-Champ. F1	Giuseppe Farina
September 3, 1950	158	Italian Grand Prix	Monza	Formula One	Giuseppe Farina
May 27, 1951	159	Swiss Grand Prix	Bremgarten	Formula One	Juan Manuel Fangio
June 2, 1951	159	Ulster Trophy	Dundrod	-	Giuseppe Farina
June 17, 1951	159	Belgian Grand Prix	Spa	Formula One	Giuseppe Farina
July 1, 1951	159	French Grand Prix	Reims	Formula One	Luigi Fagioli/Juan Manuel Fangio
October 28, 1951	159	Spanish Grand Prix	Pedralbes	Formula One	Juan Manuel Fangio
September 2, 1951	159	Bari Grand Prix	Bari	-	Juan Manuel Fangio

== Complete Formula One World Championship results ==
(key) (results in bold indicate pole position, results in italics indicate fastest lap)

Year	Chassis	Engine	Tyres	Drivers	1	2	3	4	5	6	7	8	Points	WCC
1950	158	Alfa Romeo 158 1.5 L8	P		GBR	MON	500	SUI	BEL	FRA	ITA		88	-*
1950	158	Alfa Romeo 158 1.5 L8	P	Giuseppe Farina	**1**	Ret		1	**4**	7	1		88	-*
1950	158	Alfa Romeo 158 1.5 L8	P	Juan Manuel Fangio	Ret	**1**		**Ret**	1	**1**	**Ret**		88	-*
1950	158	Alfa Romeo 158 1.5 L8	P	Luigi Fagioli	2	Ret		2	2	2	3		88	-*
1950	158	Alfa Romeo 158 1.5 L8	P	Reg Parnell	3								88	-*
1950	158	Alfa Romeo 158 1.5 L8	P	Gianbattista Guidotti	DNS								88	-*
1950	158	Alfa Romeo 158 1.5 L8	P	Consalvo Sanesi							Ret		88	-*
1950	158	Alfa Romeo 158 1.5 L8	P	Piero Taruffi							Ret		88	-*
1951	159	Alfa Romeo 158 1.5 L8	P		SUI	500	BEL	FRA	GBR	GER	ITA	ESP	75	-*
1951	159	Alfa Romeo 158 1.5 L8	P	Giuseppe Farina	3		1	5	Ret	Ret	3	3	75	-*
1951	159	Alfa Romeo 158 1.5 L8	P	Juan Manuel Fangio	**1**		**9**	**1**	2	2	**Ret**	1	75	-*
1951	159	Alfa Romeo 158 1.5 L8	P	Toulo de Graffenried	5						Ret	6	75	-*
1951	159	Alfa Romeo 158 1.5 L8	P	Consalvo Sanesi	4		Ret	10	6				75	-*
1951	159	Alfa Romeo 158 1.5 L8	P	Gianbattista Guidotti	DNS								75	-*
1951	159	Alfa Romeo 158 1.5 L8	P	Luigi Fagioli				1					75	-*
1951	159	Alfa Romeo 158 1.5 L8	P	Felice Bonetto					4	Ret	3	5	75	-*
1951	159	Alfa Romeo 158 1.5 L8	P	Paul Pietsch						Ret			75	-*

* The Constructors' Championship was not awarded until 1958.

== See also ==
- Mercedes-Benz W165
- Ferrari 125 F1
- Maserati 4CLT
- BRM Type 15
- Veritas Meteor

== Legacy ==
The 158/159 Alfetta remains one of the most successful cars in the history of Formula One, having won every race it entered in 1950, and winning 4 out of 7 races (with a podium in all of the other 3) in 1951.
