= Pierre Levegh =

French racing driver (1905–1955)

- Born: Pierre Eugène Alfred Bouillin; 22 December 1905; Paris, France
- Died: 11 June 1955 (aged 49); Le Mans, France

Formula One World Championship career
- Active years: 1950 – 1951
- Team: privateer Talbot-Lago
- Entries: 6
- Championships: 0
- Wins: 0
- Podiums: 0
- Career points: 0
- Pole positions: 0
- Fastest laps: 0
- First entry: 1950 Belgian Grand Prix
- Last entry: 1951 Italian Grand Prix

Pierre Eugène Alfred Bouillin (22 December 1905 – 11 June 1955) was a French sportsman and racing driver. He took the racing name Pierre Levegh ([ləvɛk]) in memory of his uncle Alfred Velghe, a pioneering driver who died in 1904. Levegh died in the 1955 Le Mans disaster which also killed about 81 spectators during the 1955 24 Hours of Le Mans automobile race.

== Career ==
Levegh, who was born in Paris, France, was also an ice hockey and tennis player. In motorsport he competed in Formula One for the Talbot-Lago team in 1950 and 1951, starting six races, retiring in three, and scoring no points.

At Le Mans, Levegh raced for Talbot in four races, finishing fourth in 1951. In 1952, driving single-handedly, his car suffered an engine failure in the last hour of the race with a four lap lead. The failure was due to a bolt in the central crankshaft bearing having come loose many hours earlier in the race, although many fans placed the blame on driver fatigue. Levegh had refused to let his co-driver take over because he felt only he could nurse the car home. In 1953, he came in eighth, and in 1954, he was involved in an accident in the seventh hour of racing.

== Death ==
Stage by stage reconstruction of the racing accident

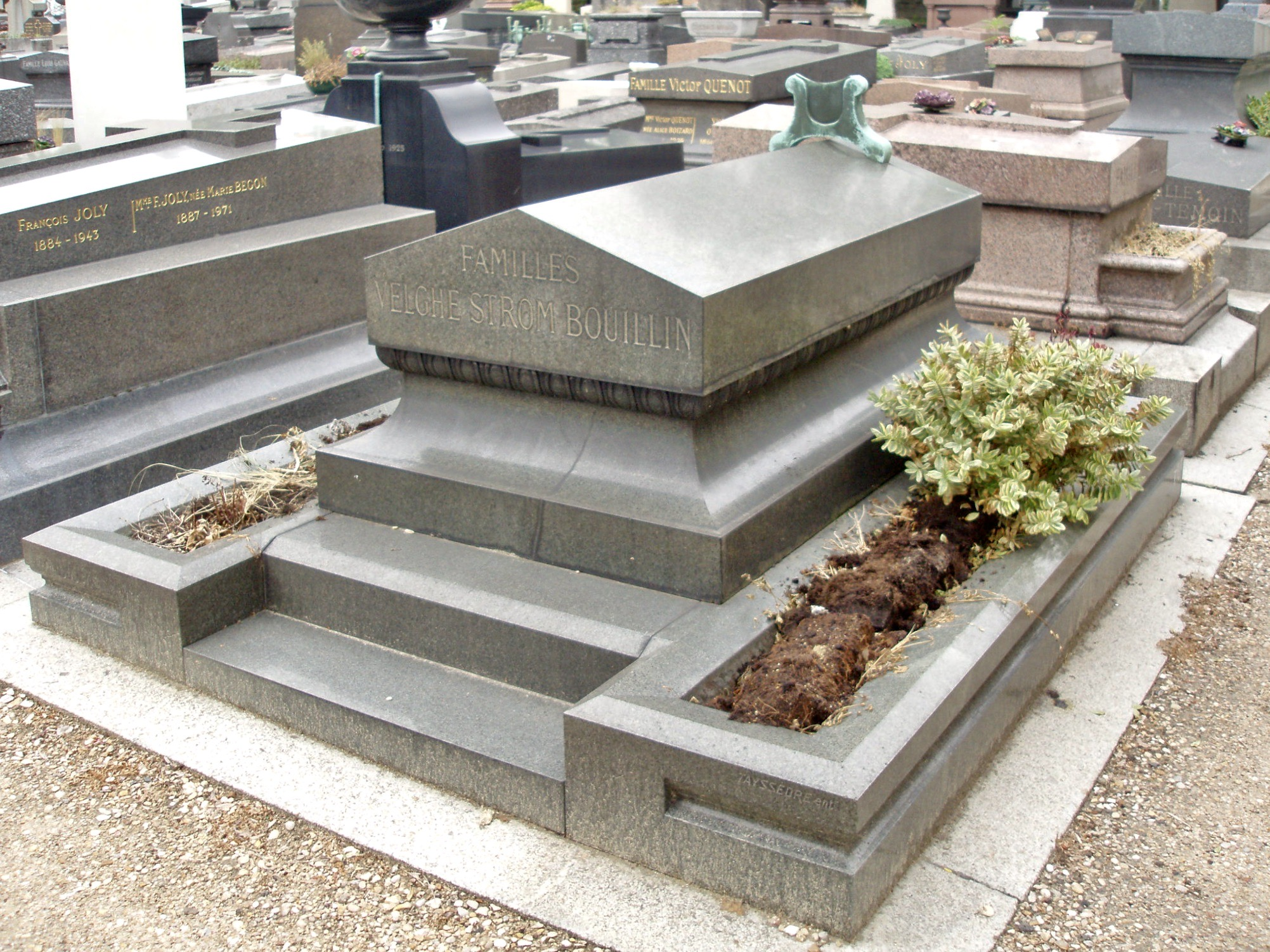
Velghe/Strom/Boullin family grave, in which Levegh is interred

In 1955, Levegh was tempted away from Talbot and joined the American John Fitch in racing a Mercedes-Benz 300 SLR. During the 24 Hours of Le Mans, in the third hour of racing, while on the Tribunes Straight, the Jaguar D-Type of Mike Hawthorn cut into the pits, slowing in front of the Austin-Healey 100S of Lance Macklin. Macklin was forced to make an evasive move away from Hawthorn, pulling across the track into the way of Levegh's faster Mercedes running just in front of Mercedes teammate Argentine Juan Manuel Fangio. Running up the side of Macklin's car, Levegh's car launched into the air, striking high on a retaining wall, disintegrating and scattering components into the crowd. Levegh was flung from his car and died upon landing, his skull crushed by the impact. The body of the Mercedes, with a high magnesium content, quickly ignited in the accident; the combination of the fire and flying car parts killed 81 spectators with over 100 injured. The race was continued in order to avoid a mass exodus of spectators, which would have blocked all access roads needed for use by the responding ambulances.

Levegh may have saved the life of five-time Formula One World Champion Fangio, who maintained that a hand-signal from Levegh to slow down moments before he struck Macklin's car was a deliberate warning, sparing Fangio the crash he would have had.

Mercedes withdrew from the race as a sign of respect to the victims, while Mike Hawthorn and Ivor Bueb continued in their Jaguars to win the race.

The accident was a major contributor to changing attitudes about the acceptance of danger in motor racing and an increase in the desire to make courses safer for spectators and drivers alike. Most notably, Mercedes stopped all motor racing activities for the next 30 years. Likewise the small British firm of Bristol Cars, whose entrants achieved a 1–2–3 finish in the 2-litre class at Le Mans that year, decided to abandon racing altogether as a result of the tragedy, scrapping all but one of their racing cars. Fitch became a safety advocate and began research into automotive safety, some of which have advanced into motorsport.

Levegh is buried in the Père Lachaise Cemetery in Paris.

== Complete Formula One World Championship results ==
(key)

Year	Entrant	Chassis	Engine	1	2	3	4	5	6	7	8	WDC	Pts
1950	Pierre Levegh	Talbot-Lago T26C	Talbot Straight-6	GBR	MON; DNA	500	SUI	BEL; 7	FRA; Ret	ITA; Ret		NC	0
1951	Pierre Levegh	Talbot-Lago T26C	Talbot Straight-6	SUI	500	BEL; 8	FRA	GBR	GER; 9	ITA; Ret	ESP	NC	0
