= 1950 Belgian Grand Prix =

← Previous race	Next race →
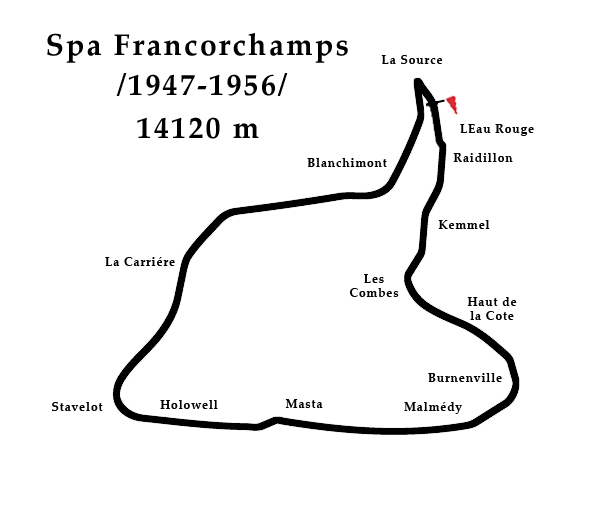

Race details
- Date: 18 June 1950
- Official name: XII Grand Prix Automobile de Belgique
- Location: Spa-Francorchamps, Spa, Belgium
- Course: Permanent racing circuit
- Course length: 14.120 km (8.825 miles)
- Distance: 35 laps, 494.2 km (308.875 miles)
- Weather: Warm, dry and sunny

Pole position
Driver	(Italy) Nino Farina	Alfa Romeo
- Time: 4:37.0

Fastest lap
Driver	(Italy) Nino Farina	Alfa Romeo
- Time: 4:34.1 on lap 18

Podium
First	(Argentina) Juan Manuel Fangio	Alfa Romeo
Second	(Italy) Luigi Fagioli	Alfa Romeo
Third	(France) Louis Rosier	Talbot-Lago-Talbot

The 1950 Belgian Grand Prix, formally titled the Grand Prix Automobile de Belgique, was a Formula One motor race held on 18 June 1950 at Spa-Francorchamps. It was race five of seven in the 1950 World Championship of Drivers. The 35-lap race was won by Alfa Romeo driver Juan Manuel Fangio after he started from second position. His teammate Luigi Fagioli finished second and Talbot-Lago driver Louis Rosier came in third.

== Report ==
By the time of the Belgian Grand Prix, the pace of the season was beginning to tell, with only 14 cars arriving at the Spa circuit. These included the dominant Alfa Romeos of Nino Farina, Juan Manuel Fangio and Luigi Fagioli. Scuderia Ferrari was down to two 125s for Luigi Villoresi and Alberto Ascari, although Ascari had a new V12 engine to try out. The factory Talbot-Lago team had three cars for Louis Rosier, Yves Giraud-Cabantous and Philippe Étancelin (standing in for the injured Eugène Martin). The rest of the field was made up of Talbot-Lagos (notably one for Raymond Sommer), a single Alta and one Maserati for Toni Branca. This race was the final entry for Geoffrey Crossley, the sport's high costs forcing him, like many privateers, to retire after just a handful of races.

Farina and Fangio were fastest as usual in qualifying with Fagioli unable to match them. Sommer split the Ferraris in his old Talbot-Lago. The race would be a similar story. The Alfas went off on their own and Sommer battled with the two Ferraris. When the Alfa stopped for fuel, Sommer found himself in the unlikely position of being race leader. Unfortunately his engine blew up. Ascari took the lead but he had to stop for fuel and that meant that the Alfas went ahead again with Fangio leading Farina and Fagioli. Farina suffered transmission trouble in the closing laps and dropped to fourth behind the best of the surviving Talbot-Lagos being driven by Rosier. Ascari finished fifth.

== Entries ==
No	Driver	Entrant	Constructor	Chassis	Engine	Tyre
2	(Italy) Luigi Villoresi	Scuderia Ferrari	Ferrari	Ferrari 125	Ferrari 125 F1 1.5 V12s	P
4	(Italy) Alberto Ascari	Scuderia Ferrari	Ferrari	Ferrari 275	Ferrari 275 F1 3.3 V12	P
6	(France) Raymond Sommer	Raymond Sommer	Talbot-Lago	Talbot-Lago T26C	Talbot 23CV 4.5 L6	D
8	(Italy) Nino Farina	Alfa Romeo SpA	Alfa Romeo	Alfa Romeo 158	Alfa Romeo 158 1.5 L8s	P
10	(Argentina) Juan Manuel Fangio	Alfa Romeo SpA	Alfa Romeo	Alfa Romeo 158	Alfa Romeo 158 1.5 L8s	P
12	(Italy) Luigi Fagioli	Alfa Romeo SpA	Alfa Romeo	Alfa Romeo 158	Alfa Romeo 158 1.5 L8s	P
14	(France) Louis Rosier	Automobiles Talbot-Darracq	Talbot-Lago	Talbot-Lago T26C-DA	Talbot 23CV 4.5 L6	D
16	(France) Philippe Étancelin	Automobiles Talbot-Darracq	Talbot-Lago	Talbot-Lago T26C-DA	Talbot 23CV 4.5 L6	D
18	(France) Yves Giraud-Cabantous	Automobiles Talbot-Darracq	Talbot-Lago	Talbot-Lago T26C-DA	Talbot 23CV 4.5 L6	D
20	(France) Eugène Chaboud	Ecurie Lutetia	Talbot-Lago	Talbot-Lago T26C-DA	Talbot 23CV 4.5 L6	D
22	(France) Pierre Levegh	Pierre Levegh	Talbot-Lago	Talbot-Lago T26C	Talbot 23CV 4.5 L6	D
24	(Belgium) Johnny Claes	Ecurie Belge	Talbot-Lago	Talbot-Lago T26C	Talbot 23CV 4.5 L6	D
26	(United Kingdom) Geoffrey Crossley	Geoffrey Crossley	Alta	Alta GP	Alta 1.5 L4s	D
30	(Switzerland) Toni Branca	Antonio Branca	Maserati	Maserati 4CL	Maserati 4CL 1.5 L4s	P

== Classification ==
=== Qualifying ===
Pos	No	Driver	Constructor	Time
1	8	(Italy) Nino Farina	Alfa Romeo	4:37
2	10	(Argentina) Juan Manuel Fangio	Alfa Romeo	4:37
3	12	(Italy) Luigi Fagioli	Alfa Romeo	4:41
4	2	(Italy) Luigi Villoresi	Ferrari	4:47
5	6	(France) Raymond Sommer	Talbot-Lago-Talbot	4:47
6	16	(France) Philippe Étancelin	Talbot-Lago-Talbot	4:49
7	4	(Italy) Alberto Ascari	Ferrari	4:52
8	14	(France) Louis Rosier	Talbot-Lago-Talbot	4:53
9	18	(France) Yves Giraud-Cabantous	Talbot-Lago-Talbot	4:56
10	22	(France) Pierre Levegh	Talbot-Lago-Talbot	5:01
11	20	(France) Eugène Chaboud	Talbot-Lago-Talbot	5:13
12	26	(United Kingdom) Geoffrey Crossley	Alta	5:44
13	30	(Switzerland) Toni Branca	Maserati	5:45
14	24	(Belgium) Johnny Claes	Talbot-Lago-Talbot	No time

=== Race ===
Pos	No	Driver	Constructor	Laps	Time/Retired	Grid	Points
1	10	(Argentina) Juan Manuel Fangio	Alfa Romeo	35	2:47:26	2	8
2	12	(Italy) Luigi Fagioli	Alfa Romeo	35	+ 14	3	6
3	14	(France) Louis Rosier	Talbot-Lago-Talbot	35	+ 2:19	8	4
4	8	(Italy) Nino Farina	Alfa Romeo	35	+ 4:05	1	4^{1}
5	4	(Italy) Alberto Ascari	Ferrari	34	+ 1 Lap	7	2
6	2	(Italy) Luigi Villoresi	Ferrari	33	+ 2 Laps	4	
7	22	(France) Pierre Levegh	Talbot-Lago-Talbot	33	+ 2 Laps	10	
8	24	(Belgium) Johnny Claes	Talbot-Lago-Talbot	32	+ 3 Laps	14	
9	26	(United Kingdom) Geoffrey Crossley	Alta	30	+ 5 Laps	12	
10	30	(Switzerland) Toni Branca	Maserati	29	+ 6 Laps	11	
Ret	20	(France) Eugène Chaboud	Talbot-Lago-Talbot	22	Oil Pipe	13	
Ret	6	(France) Raymond Sommer	Talbot-Lago-Talbot	20	Oil Pressure	5	
Ret	16	(France) Philippe Étancelin	Talbot-Lago-Talbot	15	Overheating	6	
Ret	18	(France) Yves Giraud-Cabantous	Talbot-Lago-Talbot	2	Oil Pipe	9	

Notes

- ^1 – Includes 1 point for fastest lap

== Championship standings after the race ==
Drivers' Championship standings

	Pos	Driver	Points
	1	(Italy) Nino Farina	22
	2	(Italy) Luigi Fagioli	18
	3	(Argentina) Juan Manuel Fangio	17
2	4	(France) Louis Rosier	10
1	5	(United States) Johnnie Parsons	9

- Note: Only the top five positions are listed. Only the best 4 results counted towards the Championship.

Previous race: 1950 Swiss Grand Prix	FIA Formula One World Championship; 1950 season	Next race: 1950 French Grand Prix
Previous race: 1949 Belgian Grand Prix	Belgian Grand Prix	Next race: 1951 Belgian Grand Prix
