= Talbot-Darracq Grand Prix cars =

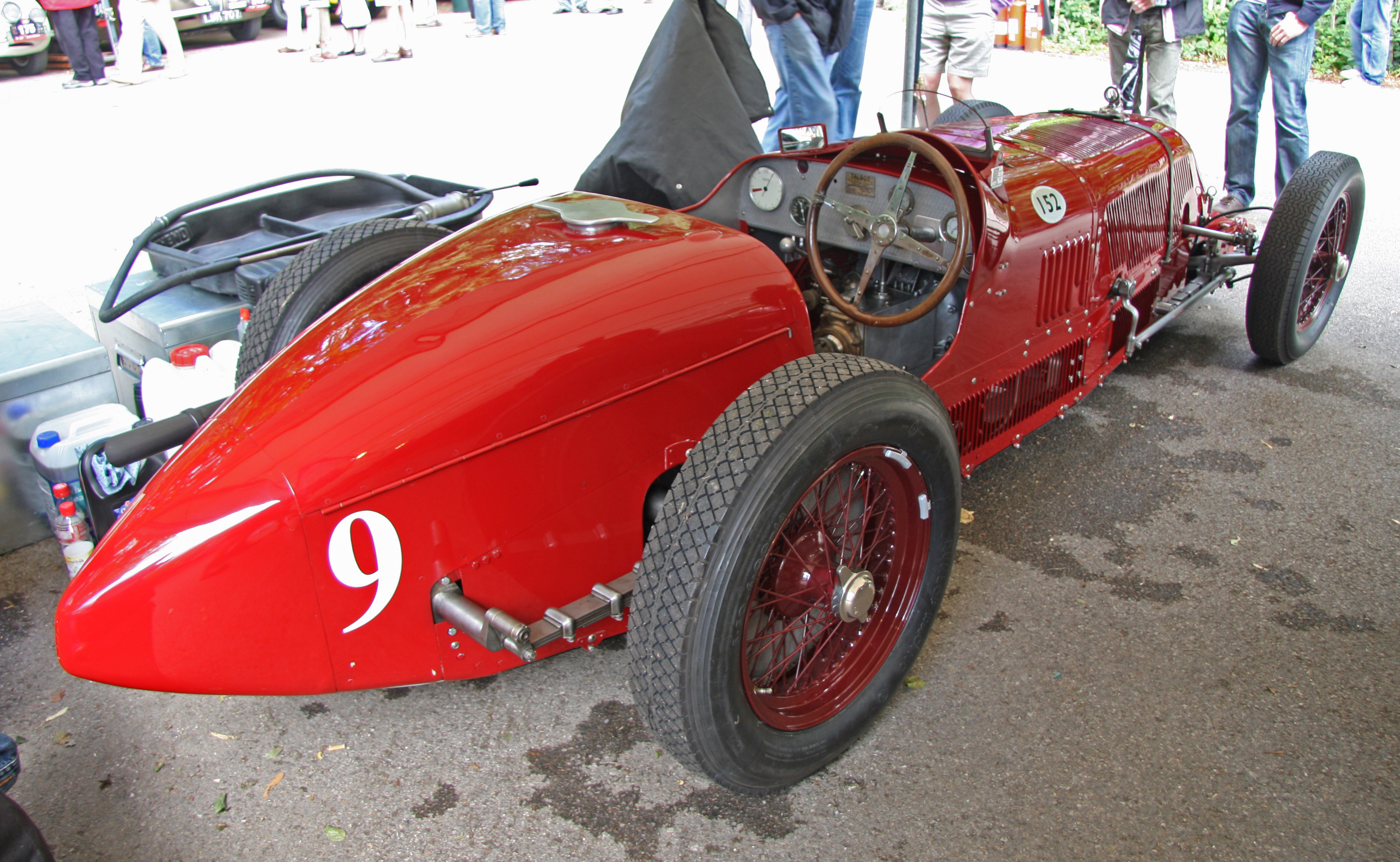
- 1927 Talbot-Darracq GP

Overview
- Manufacturer: Sunbeam
- Production: 1926–1932

Body and chassis
- Class: Grand Prix
- Layout: FR layout

Powertrain
- Engine: 1.5 L (92 cu in) I8 DOHC/OHV; 165 hp (123 kW) @ 7000 rpm (supercharged)
- Transmission: 4-speed manual

Dimensions
- Wheelbase: 103 in (2,616 mm)
- Curb weight: 800 kg (1,764 lb)

The Talbot-Darracq Grand Prix cars were a series of Grand Prix racing vehicles, designed, and produced by British-French manufacturer Talbot-Darracq, between 1921 and 1932.
