= 1950 French Grand Prix =

← Previous race	Next race →
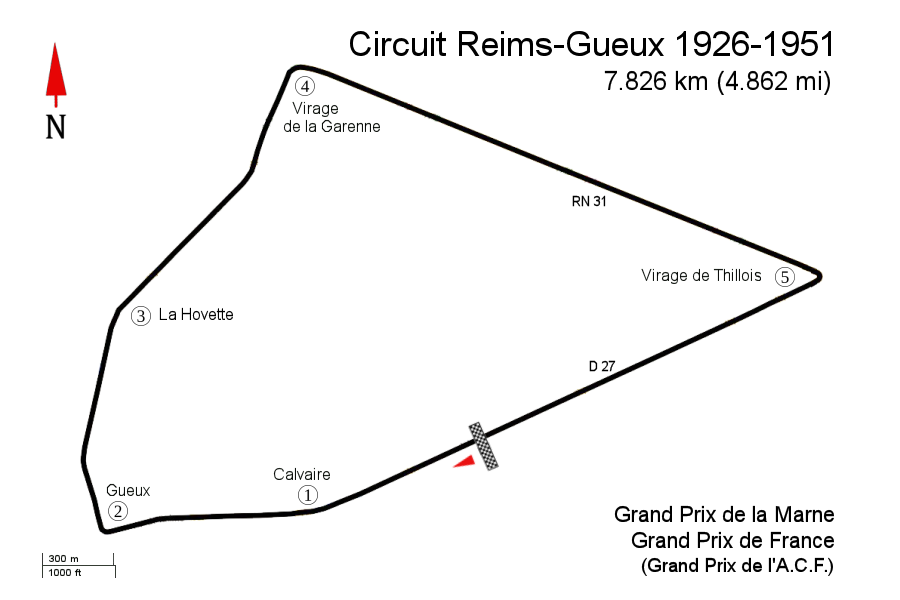

Race details
- Date: 2 July 1950
- Official name: XXXVII Grand Prix de l'A.C.F.
- Location: Reims-Gueux, Reims, France
- Course: Temporary road course
- Course length: 7.815 km (4.856 miles)
- Distance: 64 laps, 500.160 km (310.785 miles)
- Weather: Hot and sunny

Pole position
Driver	(Argentina) Juan Manuel Fangio	Alfa Romeo
- Time: 2:30.6

Fastest lap
Driver	(Argentina) Juan Manuel Fangio	Alfa Romeo
- Time: 2:35.6 on lap 7

Podium
First	(Argentina) Juan Manuel Fangio	Alfa Romeo
Second	(Italy) Luigi Fagioli	Alfa Romeo
Third	(United Kingdom) Peter Whitehead	Ferrari

The 1950 French Grand Prix was a Formula One motor race held on 2 July 1950 at Reims-Gueux. It was race 6 of 7 in the 1950 World Championship of Drivers. The 64-lap race was won by Alfa Romeo driver Juan Manuel Fangio after he started from pole position. His teammate Luigi Fagioli finished second and Peter Whitehead took third in a privateer Ferrari.

== Report ==
A total of 22 cars entered the event, four of which did not start the race. Franco Comotti did not attend the event; Eugène Chaboud did not start in his own car, instead sharing Philippe Étancelin's Talbot-Lago; and the two Scuderia Ferrari entries of Luigi Villoresi and Alberto Ascari withdrew in practice.

Fangio put in a stunning display with a 187 km/h (116 mph) practice lap. With Ferrari not starting their 3-litre cars, the main opposition was to come from the Talbots, complete with dual ignition engines with 12 spark plugs. However, they suffered from radiator problems and overheated, allowing Fangio and Fagioli to lead home another Alfa demonstration run, whilst Farina succumbed to fuel pump trouble. Peter Whitehead finished third despite a fractured head gasket in the last two laps.

== Entries ==
No	Driver	Entrant	Constructor	Chassis	Engine	Tyre
2	(Italy) Nino Farina	Alfa Romeo SpA	Alfa Romeo	Alfa Romeo 158	Alfa Romeo 158 1.5 L8s	P
4	(Italy) Luigi Fagioli	Alfa Romeo SpA	Alfa Romeo	Alfa Romeo 158	Alfa Romeo 158 1.5 L8s	P
6	(Argentina) Juan Manuel Fangio	Alfa Romeo SpA	Alfa Romeo	Alfa Romeo 158	Alfa Romeo 158 1.5 L8s	P
8	(Italy) Luigi Villoresi	Scuderia Ferrari	Ferrari	Ferrari 275	Ferrari 275 F1 3.3 V12	P
10	(Italy) Alberto Ascari	Scuderia Ferrari	Ferrari	Ferrari 275	Ferrari 275 F1 3.3 V12	P
12	(France) Raymond Sommer	Automobiles Talbot-Darracq	Talbot-Lago	Talbot-Lago T26C-GS	Talbot 23CV 4.5 L6	D
14	(United Kingdom) Peter Whitehead	Peter Whitehead	Ferrari	Ferrari 125	Ferrari 125 F1 1.5 V12s	P
16	(France) Philippe Étancelin (Note: Philippe Étancelin qualified and drove 26 laps of the race in the #16 Talbot-Lago. Eugène Chaboud, who did not start the race despite qualifying in his own car, took over Étancelin's vehicle for 33 laps of the race. They shared the two points for fifth place.)	Philippe Étancelin	Talbot-Lago	Talbot-Lago T26C-DA	Talbot 23CV 4.5 L6	D
18	(France) Yves Giraud-Cabantous	Automobiles Talbot-Darracq	Talbot-Lago	Talbot-Lago T26C-DA	Talbot 23CV 4.5 L6	D
20	(France) Louis Rosier	Automobiles Talbot-Darracq	Talbot-Lago	Talbot-Lago T26C-DA	Talbot 23CV 4.5 L6	D
22	(France) Pierre Levegh	Pierre Levegh	Talbot-Lago	Talbot-Lago T26C	Talbot 23CV 4.5 L6	D
24	(France) Eugène Chaboud	Ecurie Lutetia	Talbot-Lago	Talbot-Lago T26C	Talbot 23CV 4.5 L6	D
26	(France) Charles Pozzi (Note: Charles Pozzi qualified and drove 14 laps of the race in the #26 Talbot-Lago. Louis Rosier, whose own car had already retired, took over #26 for 42 laps of the race.)	Charles Pozzi	Talbot-Lago	Talbot-Lago T26C	Talbot 23CV 4.5 L6	D
28	(Italy) Franco Rol	Officine Alfieri Maserati	Maserati	Maserati 4CLT/48	Maserati 4CLT 1.5 L4s	P
30	(Monaco) Louis Chiron	Officine Alfieri Maserati	Maserati	Maserati 4CLT/48	Maserati 4CLT 1.5 L4s	P
32	(United Kingdom) Reg Parnell	Scuderia Ambrosiana	Maserati	Maserati 4CLT/48	Maserati 4CLT 1.5 L4s	D
34	(United Kingdom) David Hampshire (Note: David Hampshire qualified the #34 Maserati and drove it in the race until he was forced to retire. David Murray, named substitute driver for the car, was not used during the Grand Prix.)	Scuderia Ambrosiana	Maserati	Maserati 4CLT/48	Maserati 4CLT 1.5 L4s	D
36	(Argentina) José Froilán González	Scuderia Achille Varzi	Maserati	Maserati 4CLT/48	Maserati 4CLT 1.5 L4s	P
38	(Italy) Franco Comotti	Scuderia Achille Varzi	Maserati	Maserati 4CLT/48	Maserati 4CLT 1.5 L4s	P
40	(Italy) Felice Bonetto	Scuderia Milano	Maserati-Milano	Maserati 4CLT/50	Milano 1.5 L4s	P
42	(Belgium) Johnny Claes	Ecurie Belge	Talbot-Lago	Talbot-Lago T26C	Talbot 23CV 4.5 L6	D
44	(France) Robert Manzon	Equipe Gordini	Simca-Gordini	Simca-Gordini T15	Simca-Gordini 15C 1.5 L4s	E

== Classification ==
=== Qualifying ===
Pos	No	Driver	Constructor	Time
1	6	(Argentina) Juan Manuel Fangio	Alfa Romeo	2:30.6
2	2	(Italy) Nino Farina	Alfa Romeo	2:32.5
3	4	(Italy) Luigi Fagioli	Alfa Romeo	2:34.7
4	16	(France) Philippe Étancelin	Talbot-Lago-Talbot	2:39.0
5	18	(France) Yves Giraud-Cabantous	Talbot-Lago-Talbot	2:42.7
6	20	(France) Louis Rosier	Talbot-Lago-Talbot	2:46.0
7	28	(Italy) Franco Rol	Maserati	2:46.7
8	36	(Argentina) José Froilán González	Maserati	2:48.0
9	22	(France) Pierre Levegh	Talbot-Lago-Talbot	2:49.0
10	24	(France) Eugène Chaboud	Talbot-Lago-Talbot	Unknown
11	40	(Italy) Felice Bonetto	Maserati-Milano	2:51.0
12	32	(United Kingdom) Reg Parnell	Maserati	2:54.0
13	44	(France) Robert Manzon	Simca-Gordini	2:55.5
14	30	(Monaco) Louis Chiron	Maserati	2:55.9
15	42	(Belgium) Johnny Claes	Talbot-Lago-Talbot	2:57.4
16	26	(France) Charles Pozzi	Talbot-Lago-Talbot	2:58.0
17	12	(France) Raymond Sommer	Talbot-Lago-Talbot	2:59.3
18	34	(United Kingdom) David Hampshire	Maserati	2:59.5
19	14	(United Kingdom) Peter Whitehead	Ferrari	3:01.0
WD	8	(Italy) Luigi Villoresi	Ferrari	–
WD	10	(Italy) Alberto Ascari	Ferrari	–
DNA	38	(Italy) Franco Comotti	Maserati	–

=== Race ===
Pos	No	Driver	Constructor	Laps	Time/Retired	Grid	Points
1	6	(Argentina) Juan Manuel Fangio	Alfa Romeo	64	2:57:52.8	1	9^{1}
2	4	(Italy) Luigi Fagioli	Alfa Romeo	64	+ 25.7	3	6
3	14	(United Kingdom) Peter Whitehead	Ferrari	61	+ 3 Laps	18	4
4	44	(France) Robert Manzon	Simca-Gordini	61	+ 3 Laps	12	3
5	16	(France) Eugène Chaboud	Talbot-Lago-Talbot	59	+ 5 Laps	4	1
5	16	(France) Philippe Étancelin	Talbot-Lago-Talbot	59	+ 5 Laps	4	1
6	26	(France) Charles Pozzi	Talbot-Lago-Talbot	56	+ 8 Laps	15	
6	26	(France) Louis Rosier	Talbot-Lago-Talbot	56	+ 8 Laps	15	
7	2	(Italy) Nino Farina	Alfa Romeo	55	Fuel Pump	2	
8	18	(France) Yves Giraud-Cabantous	Talbot-Lago-Talbot	52	+ 12 Laps	5	
Ret	22	(France) Pierre Levegh	Talbot-Lago-Talbot	36	Engine	9	
Ret	40	(Italy) Felice Bonetto	Maserati-Milano	14	Engine	10	
Ret	42	(Belgium) Johnny Claes	Talbot-Lago-Talbot	11	Overheating	14	
Ret	20	(France) Louis Rosier	Talbot-Lago-Talbot	10	Overheating	6	
Ret	32	(United Kingdom) Reg Parnell	Maserati	9	Engine	11	
Ret	28	(Italy) Franco Rol	Maserati	6	Engine	7	
Ret	30	(Monaco) Louis Chiron	Maserati	6	Engine	13	
Ret	34	(United Kingdom) David Hampshire	Maserati	5	Engine	17	
Ret	12	(France) Raymond Sommer	Talbot-Lago-Talbot	4	Overheating	16	
Ret	36	(Argentina) José Froilán González	Maserati	3	Engine	8	
DNS	24	(France) Eugène Chaboud	Talbot-Lago-Talbot		Practice only		
DNS	8	(Italy) Luigi Villoresi	Ferrari		Withdrawn		
DNS	10	(Italy) Alberto Ascari	Ferrari		Withdrawn		

Notes

- ^1 – Includes 1 point for fastest lap

== Championship standings after the race ==
Drivers' Championship standings

	Pos	Driver	Points
2	1	(Argentina) Juan Manuel Fangio	26
	2	(Italy) Luigi Fagioli	24
2	3	(Italy) Giuseppe Farina	22
	4	(France) Louis Rosier	10
	5	(United States) Johnnie Parsons	9

- Note: Only the top five positions are listed. Only the best 4 results counted towards the Championship.

== Notes ==
Previous race: 1950 Belgian Grand Prix	FIA Formula One World Championship; 1950 season	Next race: 1950 Italian Grand Prix
Previous race: 1949 French Grand Prix	French Grand Prix	Next race: 1951 French Grand Prix
