= Straight-eight engine =

Inline piston engine with eight cylinders

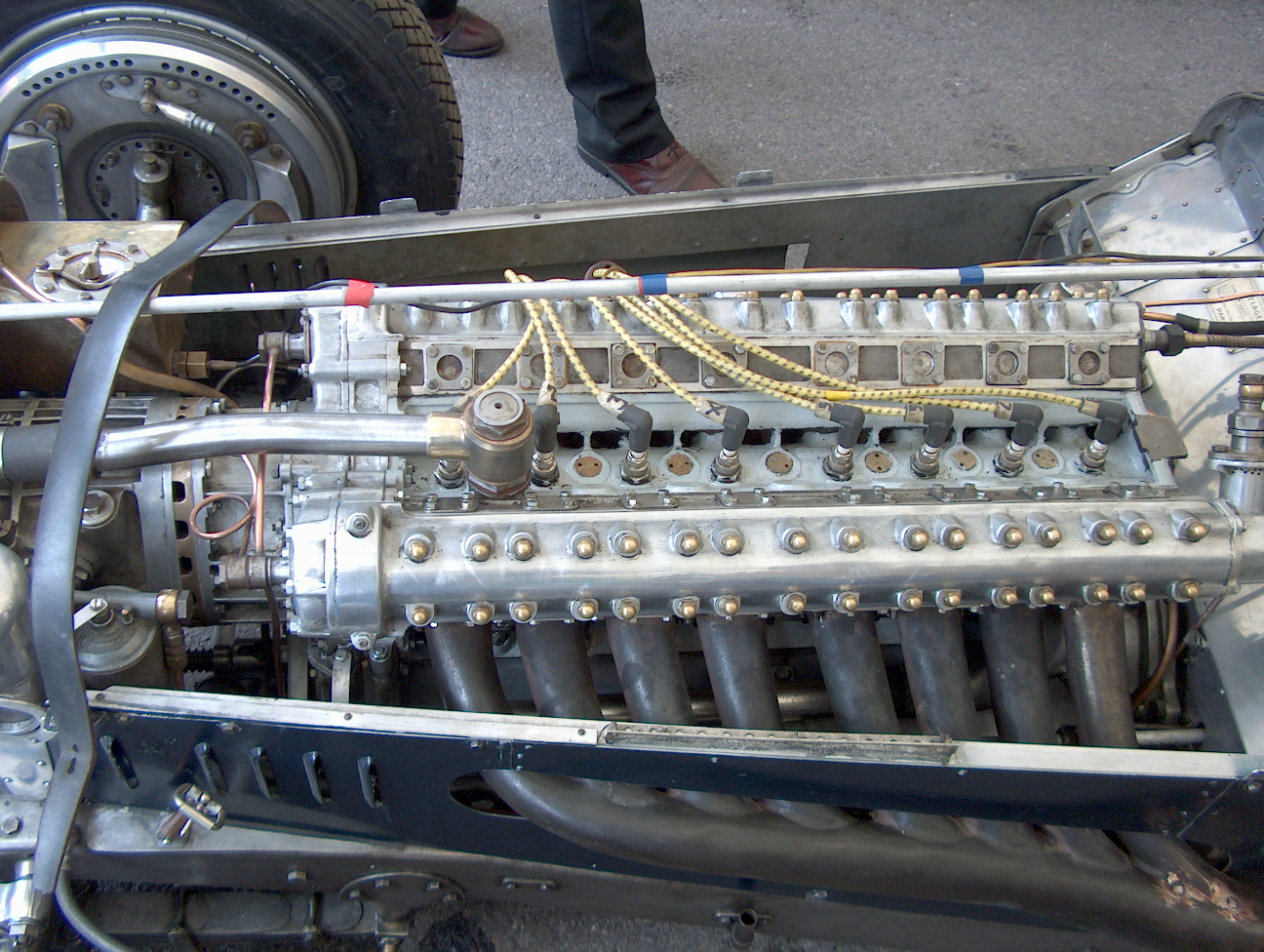
Delage straight-eight racing engine

Straight-eight engine with firing order 1-4-7-3-8-5-2-6

The straight-eight engine (also known as a inline-eight engine; abbreviated as I8) is an eight-cylinder internal combustion engine with all eight cylinders mounted in a straight line along the crankcase. The type has been produced in side-valve, IOE, overhead-valve, sleeve-valve, and overhead-cam configurations.

A straight-eight can be timed for inherent primary and secondary balance, with no unbalanced primary or secondary forces or moments. However, crankshaft torsional vibration, present to some degree in all engines, is sufficient to require the use of a harmonic damper at the accessory end of the crankshaft. Without such damping, fatigue cracking near the rear main bearing journal may occur, leading to engine failure.

Although an inline six-cylinder engine can also be timed for inherent primary and secondary balance, a straight-eight develops more power strokes per revolution and, as a result, will run more smoothly under load than an inline six. Also, due to the even number of power strokes per revolution, a straight-eight does not produce unpleasant odd-order harmonic vibration in the vehicle's driveline at low engine speeds.

The smooth running characteristics of the straight-eight made it popular in luxury and racing cars of the past. However, the engine's length demanded the use of a long engine compartment, making the basic design unacceptable in modern vehicles. Also, due to the length of the engine, torsional vibration in both crankshaft and camshaft can adversely affect reliability and performance at high speeds. In particular, a phenomenon referred to as "crankshaft whip," caused by the effects of centrifugal force on the crank throws at high engine rpm, can cause physical contact between the connecting rods and crankcase walls, leading to the engine's destruction. As a result, the design has been displaced almost completely by the shorter V8 engine configuration.

== Early period (1903–1918) ==
The first straight-eight was conceived by Charron, Girardot et Voigt (CGV) in 1903, but it did not go into production or take part in a race. Great strides were made during World War I, as Mercedes made straight-eight aircraft engines like the Mercedes D.IV. Advantages of the straight-eight engine for aircraft applications included the aerodynamic efficiency of the long, narrow configuration, and the inherent balance of the engine making counterweights on the crankshaft unnecessary. The disadvantages of crank and camshaft twisting were not considered at this time, since aircraft engines of the time ran at low speeds to keep propeller tip speed below the speed of sound.

Unlike the V8 engine configuration, examples of which were used in De Dion-Bouton, Scripps-Booth, and Cadillac automobiles by 1914, no straight-eight engines were used in production cars before 1920.

== Inter-war period (1919–1941) ==
=== Luxury automobiles ===
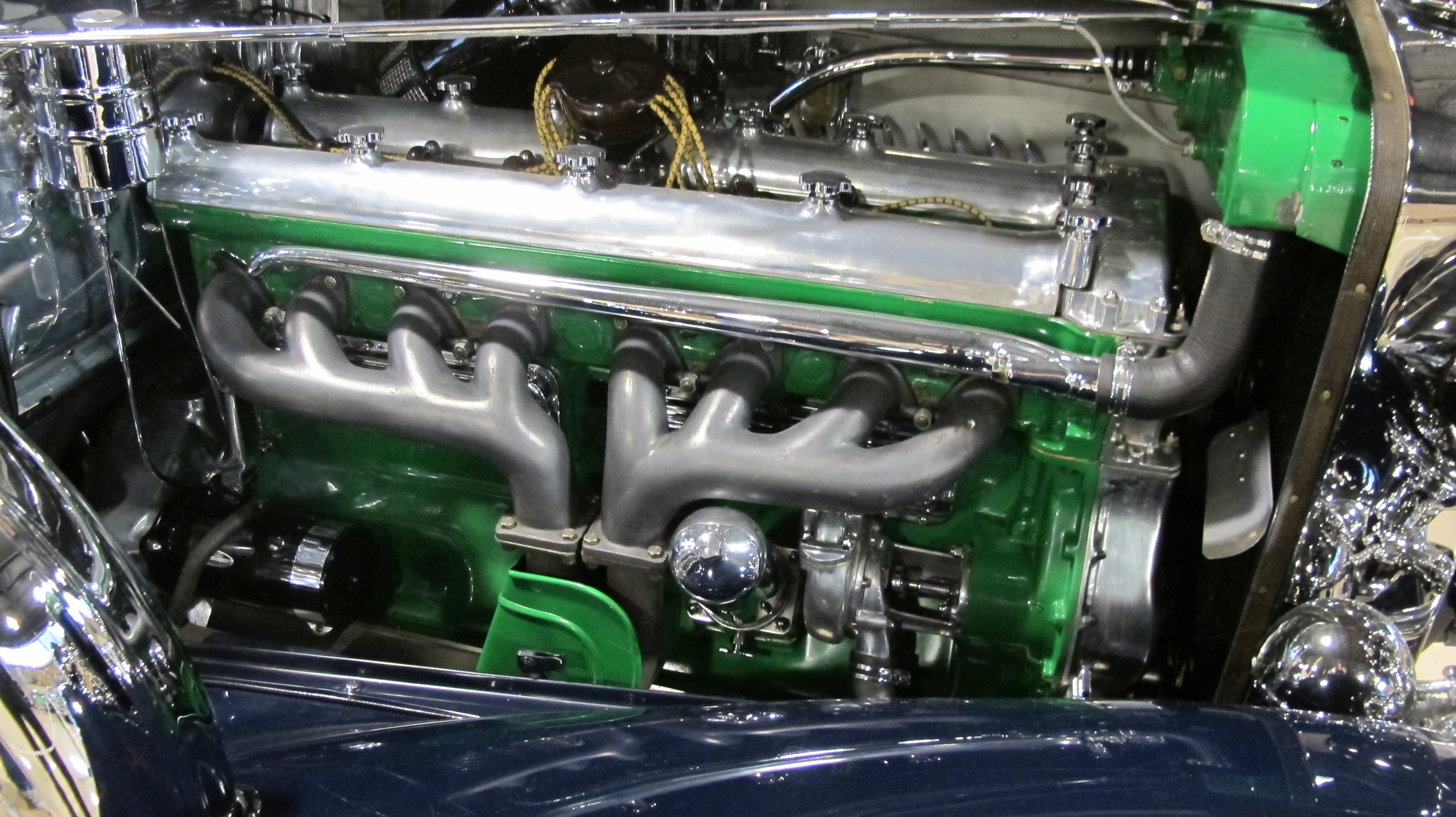
Dual overhead camshaft Duesenberg Model J engine

Italy's Isotta Fraschini introduced the first production automobile straight-eight in their Tipo 8 at the Paris Salon in 1919 Leyland Motors introduced their OHC straight-eight powered Leyland Eight luxury car at the International Motor Exhibition at Olympia, London in 1920. The Duesenberg brothers introduced their first production straight-eight in 1921.

Straight-eight engines were used in expensive luxury and performance vehicles until after World War II. Bugattis and Duesenbergs commonly used double overhead cam straight-eight engines. Other notable straight-eight-powered automobiles were built by Daimler, Mercedes-Benz, Isotta Fraschini, Alfa Romeo, Stutz, Stearns-Knight and Packard. One marketing feature of these engines was their impressive length — some of the Duesenberg engines were over 4 ft (1.2 m) long, resulting in the long hoods (bonnets) found on these automobiles.

=== Premium automobiles in the United States ===
In the United States in the 1920s, automobile manufacturers, including Hupmobile (1925), Chandler (1926), Marmon (1927), Gardner (1925), Kissel (1925), Locomobile (1925) and Auburn (1925) began using straight-eight engines in cars targeted at the middle class. Engine manufacturer Lycoming built straight-eight engines for sale to automobile manufacturers, including Gardner, Auburn, Kissel, and Locomobile. Hupmobile built their own engine. Lycoming was purchased by Auburn owner Errett Lobban Cord, who used a Lycoming straight-eight in his front-drive Cord L-29 automobile, and had Lycoming build the straight-eight engine for the Duesenberg Model J, which had been designed by the Duesenberg brothers for the Cord-owned Duesenberg Inc. The automobile manufacturers within the Cord Corporation, comprising Auburn, Cord, and Duesenberg, were shut down in 1937. Lycoming continues to this day as an aircraft engine manufacturer.

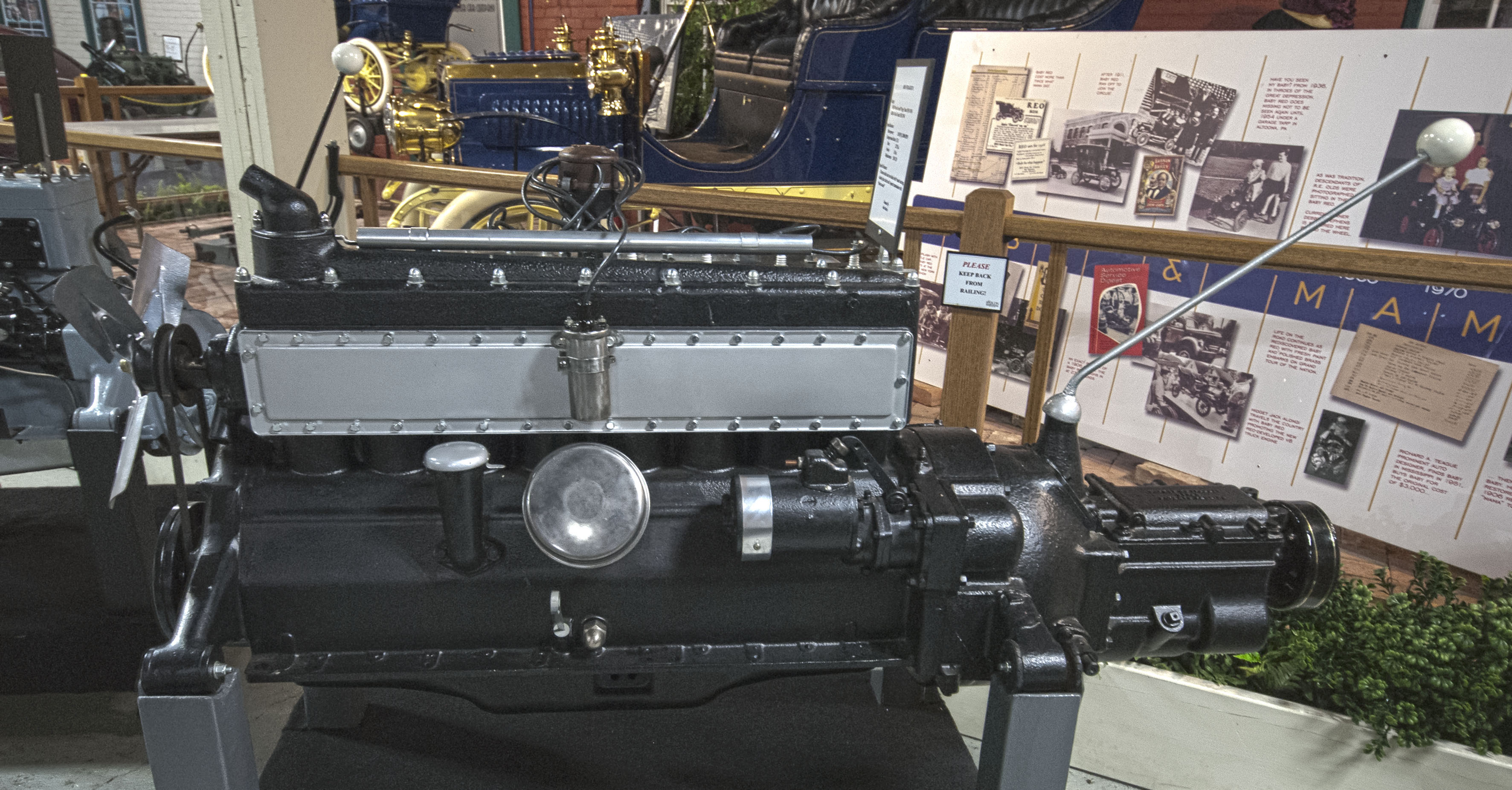
REO Straight 8 from 1931-1934

In the late 1920s, volume sellers Hudson and Studebaker introduced straight-eight engines for the premium vehicles in their respective lines. They were followed in the early 1930s by Nash (with a dual-ignition unit), REO, and the Buick, Oldsmobile, and Pontiac divisions of General Motors.

The Buick straight-eight was an overhead valve design, while the Oldsmobile straight-8 and Pontiac straight-8 straight-eights were flathead engines. Chevrolet, as an entry-level marque, did not have a straight-eight. Cadillac, the luxury brand of General Motors, stayed with their traditional V8 engines. In order to have engines as smooth as the straight-eights of its competitors, Cadillac introduced the crossplane crankshaft for its V8, and added V12 and V16 engines to the top of its lineup.

Ford never adopted the straight-eight; their entry-level Ford cars used flathead V8 engines until the 1950s while their Lincoln luxury cars used V8 from the 1930s to the 1980s and V12 engines in the 1930s and 1940s. Chrysler used flathead straight-eights in its premium Chrysler cars, including the Imperial luxury model.

=== Airships ===
The British R101 rigid airship was fitted with five Beardmore Tornado Mk I inline eight-cylinder diesel engines. These engines were intended to give an output of 700 bhp (520 kW) at 1,000 rpm but in practice had a continuous output rating of only 585 bhp (436 kW) at 900 rpm.

== Post-war ==
After World War II, changes in the automobile market resulted in the decline and eventual extinction of the straight-eight as an automobile engine. The primary users of the straight-eight were American luxury and premium cars that were carried over from before the war. A Flxible inter-city bus used the Buick straight-eight.

During World War II, improvements in the refinery technology used to produce aviation gasoline resulted in the availability of large amounts of inexpensive high octane gasoline. Engines could be designed with higher compression ratios to take advantage of high-octane gasoline. This led to more highly stressed engines which amplified the limitations of the long crankshaft and camshaft in the straight-eight engines.

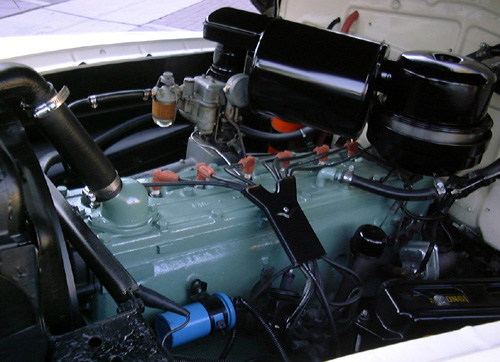
1940s flathead Oldsmobile straight-8 engine

Oldsmobile replaced their straight-eight flathead engine with its famous overhead valve Rocket V8 in 1949. Chrysler replaced its straight-eight with its famous Hemi V-8 for 1951. Hudson retired its straight-eight at the end of the 1952 model year. Buick introduced a 322 cu in (5.3 L) V8 in 1953, with similar displacement as their 320.2 cu in (5.2 L) straight-8, which was produced until the end of the 1953 model year. Pontiac maintained production on their straight-eight, as well as a L-head inline six, through the end of the 1954 model year, after which a V8 became standard. Packard ended production of their signature straight-eight at the end of 1954, replacing it with an overhead valve V8.

By the end of the 1970s overhead valve V8s powered 80% of automobiles built in the US, and most of the rest had six-cylinder engines.

In Europe, many automobile factories had been destroyed during World War II, and it took many years before war-devastated economies recovered enough to make large cars popular again. The change in the design of cars from a long engine compartment between separate fenders to the modern configuration with its shorter engine compartment quickly led to the demise of the straight-8 engine. As a result of this, and of gasoline prices several times as expensive as in the U.S., four- and six-cylinder engines powered the majority of cars in Europe, and the few eight-cylinder cars produced were in the V8 configuration.

=== Military use ===
The British Army selected Rolls-Royce B80 series of straight-eight engines in the Alvis FV 600 armoured vehicle family. The Alvis Saladin armoured car was a 6x6 design with the engine compartment in the rear, a 76.2mm low pressure gun turret in the centre and the driver in front. The Saracen armoured personnel carrier had the engine in front with the driver in the centre and space for up to nine troops in the rear. The Stalwart amphibious logistics carrier has the driver's compartment over the front wheels, the larger B81 engine in the rear and a large load compartment over the middle and rear. The Salamander firefighting vehicle was unarmoured, and resembled the Stalwart with a conventional fire engine superstructure.

The Rolls-Royce B80 series of engines were also used in other military and civilian applications, such as the Leyland Martian military truck, the winch engine in the Centurion ARV, and various Dennis fire engines.

== Performance and racing cars ==
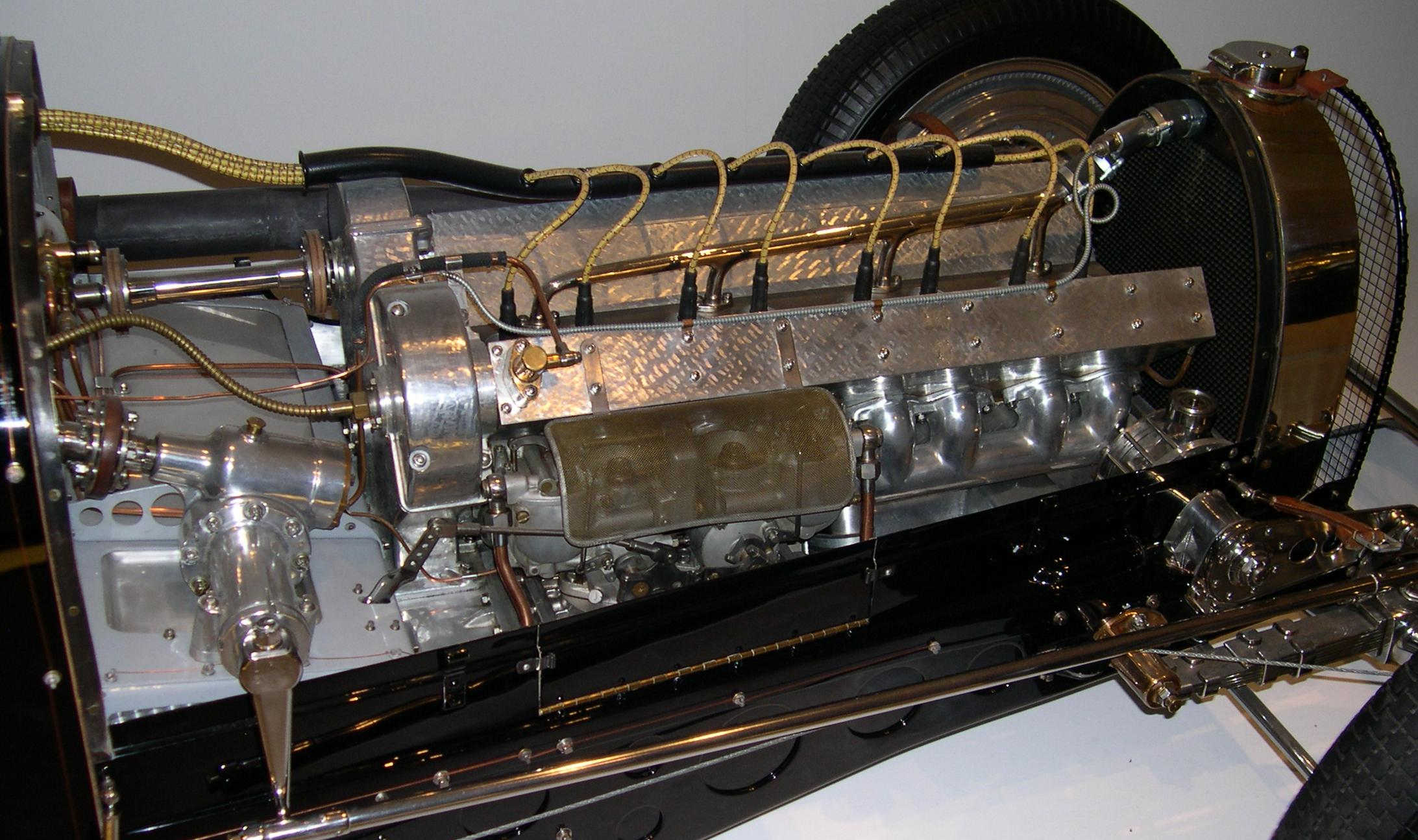
1933 Bugatti DOHC straight-8 in a 1930s Type 59 Grand Prix racer

Despite the shortcomings of length, weight, bearing friction, and torsional vibrations that led to the straight-eight's post-war demise, the straight-eight was the performance engine design of choice from the late 1920s to the late 1940s, and continued to excel in motorsport until the mid-1950s. Bugatti, Duesenberg, Alfa Romeo, Mercedes-Benz, and Miller built successful racing cars with high-performance dual overhead camshaft straight-eight engines in the 1920s and 1930s.

The Duesenberg brothers introduced the first successful straight-eight racing engine in 1920, when their 3 L engine placed third, fourth, and sixth at the Indianapolis 500. The following year one of their cars won the French Grand Prix, while two others placed fourth and sixth in the race. Based on work the company had done on 16-cylinder aircraft engines during World War I, the overhead camshaft, three-valve-per-cylinder engine produced 115 brake horsepower (86 kW) at 4,250 rpm, and was capable of revving to an astonishing (at the time) 5,000 rpm. No Grand Prix engine before the war had peaked at more than 3,000 rpm.

Bugatti experimented with straight-eight engines from 1922, and in 1924, he introduced the 2 L Bugatti Type 35, one of the most successful racing cars of all time, which eventually won over 1000 races. Like the Duesenbergs, Bugatti got his ideas from building aircraft engines during World War I, and like them, his engine was a high-revving overhead camshaft unit with three valves per cylinder. It produced 100 bhp (75 kW) at 5,000 rpm and could be revved to over 6,000 rpm. Nearly 400 of the Type 35 and its derivatives were produced, an all-time record for Grand Prix motor racing.

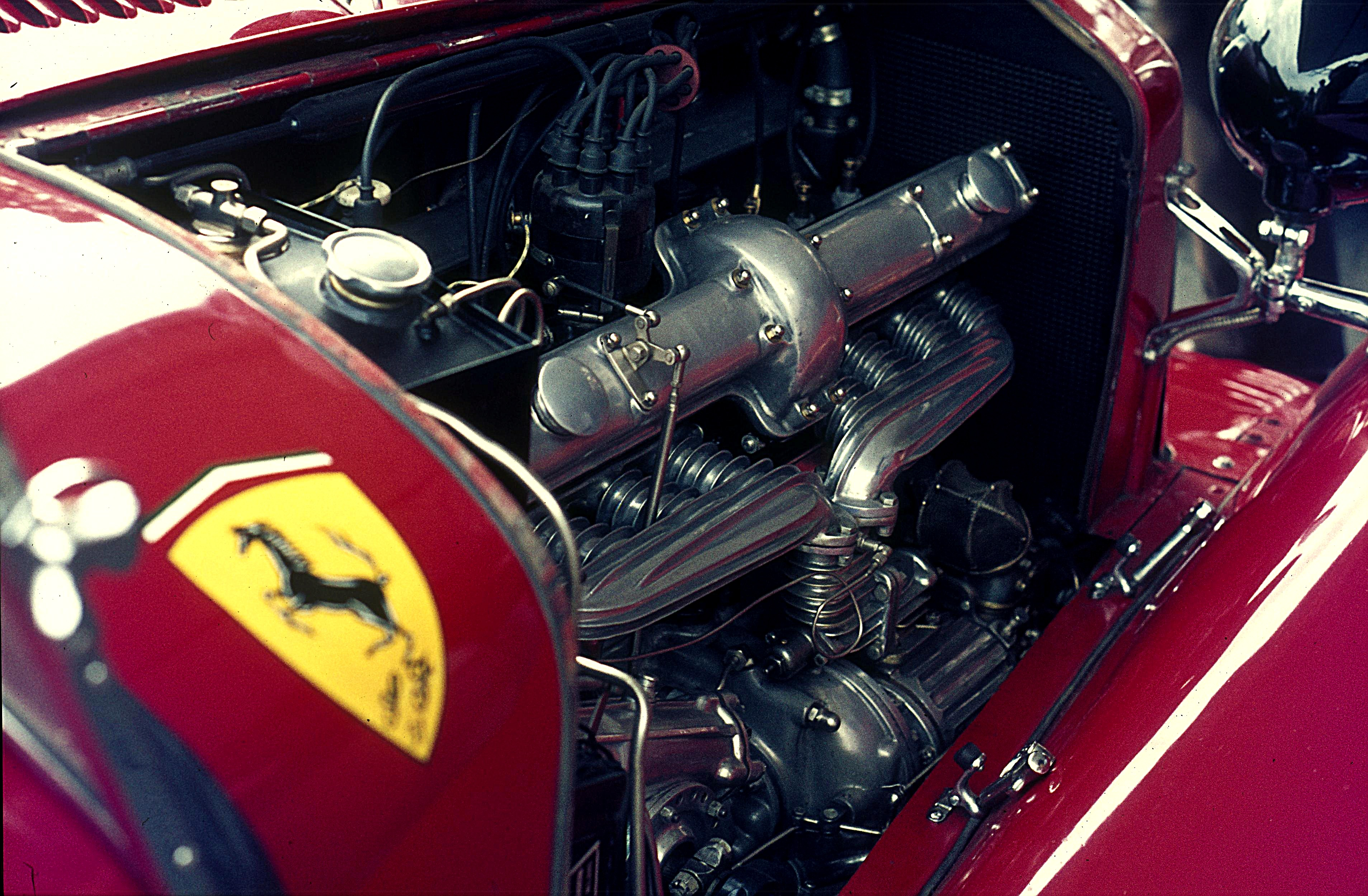
1932 Alfa Romeo 2,336 cc (142.6 cu in) DOHC Roots supercharged straight-8

Alfa Romeo were the first to react to the engineering problems of the straight-eight: in their racing car engines for the P2 and P3 and in their Alfa Romeo 8C 2300/2600/2900 sports cars of Mille Miglia and Le Mans fame the camshaft drive had been moved to the engine centre, between cylinders four and five, thus reducing the aforementioned limitations. The straight-eight was actually built as a symmetrical pair of straight-four engines joined in the middle at common gear trains for the camshafts and superchargers. It had two overhead camshafts, but only two valves per cylinder.

The Alfa Romeo straight-eight would return after World War II to dominate the first season of Formula One racing in 1950, and to win the second season against competition from Ferrari's V12-powered car in 1951. The Alfa Romeo 158/159 Alfetta was originally designed in 1937 and won 47 of 54 Grands Prix entered between 1938 and 1951 (with a six-year gap in the middle caused by the war). By 1951, their 1.5 L supercharged engines could produce 425 bhp (317 kW) at 9,300 rpm, and could rev as high as 10,500 rpm. However, the engines were at the end of their potential, and rule changes for the 1952 season made the Alfettas obsolete.

Mercedes-Benz would create the last notable straight-eight racing cars in 1955, with the championship-winning W196 Formula One racing car and the 300SLR sports racing car. The 300SLR was famous for Stirling Moss and Denis Jenkinson's victory in the 1955 Mille Miglia, but notorious for Pierre Levegh's deadly accident at the 1955 24 Hours of Le Mans. The 300SLR was the final development of the Alfa Romeo design of the early 1930s as not only the camshaft, but now also the gearbox was driven from the engine's centre. Engineers calculated that torsional stresses would be too high if they took power from the end of the long crankshaft, so they put a central gear train in the middle (which also ran the dual camshafts, dual magnetos, and other accessories) and ran a drive shaft to the clutch housing at the rear.

== See also ==
- List of GM engines
