= Emilio Villoresi =

Italian Grand Prix motor racing driver

Emilio "Mimì" Villoresi (December 7, 1914 – June 20, 1939) was an Italian Grand Prix motor racing driver.

Villoresi was born in Milan, Lombardy. He was the younger brother of the Maserati driver Luigi Villoresi who co-drove with him in several races at the beginning of their career. Emilio Villoresi and his brother first competed together in the 1935 and 1936 Mille Miglia driving a Fiat 508CS Balilla Sport but after a disappointing finish they purchased a Maserati which they initially drove individually in different races. After a string of good results Emilio was signed to drive an Alfa Romeo for Scuderia Ferrari in the 1937 Grand Prix season.

Emilio Villoresi finished third behind teammates Giuseppe Farina and Clemente Biondetti at the 1937 Coppa Principessa di Piemonte and at the inaugural race at the "Circuito della Superba" in Genoa. In 1938, when the German Silver Arrows were dominating Grand Prix events, Villoresi managed to win the class competition at both the Coppa Ciano and the Italian Grand Prix. Villoresi took third at the 1939 Tripoli Grand Prix. In May 1939, he finished a strong third to the still dominant Mercedes-Benz cars of Hermann Lang and Rudolf Caracciola at the Nürburgring.

Villoresi's career was cut short the following month when he suffered a fatal crash while testing an Alfa Romeo 158 Alfetta at the Monza Circuit.

== See also ==
- Emilio Materassi
