= Alfa Romeo Tipo 316 =

- Category: Grand Prix 3 litre
- Constructor: Alfa Romeo
- Designer: Gioacchino Colombo
- Production: 1938
- Successor: Alfa Romeo Tipo 162

Technical specifications
- Chassis: Aluminum tube chassis
- Suspension (front): independent, transverse leaf spring and two longitudinal guides
- Suspension (rear): independent, transverse leaf spring with hydraulic shock absorbers
- Engine: Alfa Romeo 2,958 cc (180.5 cu in) 60° V16 supercharged 350 hp (261 kW) @ 7500 rpm front engined, longitudinally mounted
- Transmission: Alfa 4-speed manual

Competition history
- Notable entrants: Alfa Corse
- Notable drivers: Giuseppe Farina; Clemente Biondetti
- Debut: 1938 Tripoli Grand Prix
Races	Wins
4	0

Alfa Romeo Tipo 316, 316 or 16C-316 Grand prix car was used in Grand Prix seasons 1938 and 1939, when it was driven by Giuseppe Farina and Clemente Biondetti. The Tipo 316 was one of three Alfa Romeo cars designed for the new rules in 1938, which differed mainly by the engine, the other two were the Alfa Romeo Tipo 308 straight-8 and Alfa Romeo Tipo 312 with a V12 engine. The car was based on Alfa Romeo 12C-37. It had roots supercharged 60 degree (V16 obtained from two 158 engines fitted to a common crankcase) engine from 2,958 cc (180.5 cu in) capacity 58 mm × 70 mm (2.28 in × 2.76 in) produced 350 bhp (261 kW) at 7500 rpm. The engine was more powerful than the one in Tipo 308 or 312, but it was still not really competitive against Germans.

The car debuted at the first major race of the season for the Tripoli Grand Prix, where Biondetti resigned. In the primary race for the Grand Prix of Italy Farina scored in the second-place ranking is the only car on the podium, Biondetti was fourth. The last appearance of the car was on the primary race for the Grand Prix of Switzerland in the 1939 season, where Farina resigned after the first laps led. After that team efforts were devoted to 1.5 liter car Alfa Romeo 158 for Class Voiturette, and the Tipo 316 was no longer developed.

== Technical Data ==
Technical data	Tipo 308	Tipo 312	Type 316
Engine:	8-cylinder in-line engine	12-cylinder 60° V-engine	16-cylinder 60° V-engine
displacement:	2991 cm^{3}	2995 cm^{3}	2958 cm^{3}
Bore x stroke:	69 x 100mm	66 x 73mm	58 x 70 mm
Max power:	295 hp	320 hp	350 hp
Valve control:	2 overhead camshafts per cylinder row, 2 valves per cylinder
Upload:	Roots compressor
Gearbox:	4-speed manual, transaxle
suspension front:	Individual type Dubonnet, coil springs
suspension rear:	Pendulum axis, transverse leaf spring
Brakes:	Hydraulic drum brakes
Chassis & body:	Crate beam frame with aluminiumbody	Tubular space frame with aluminium body
Wheelbase:	280 cm
Dry weight:	About 870 kg
