= Alfa Romeo 12C =

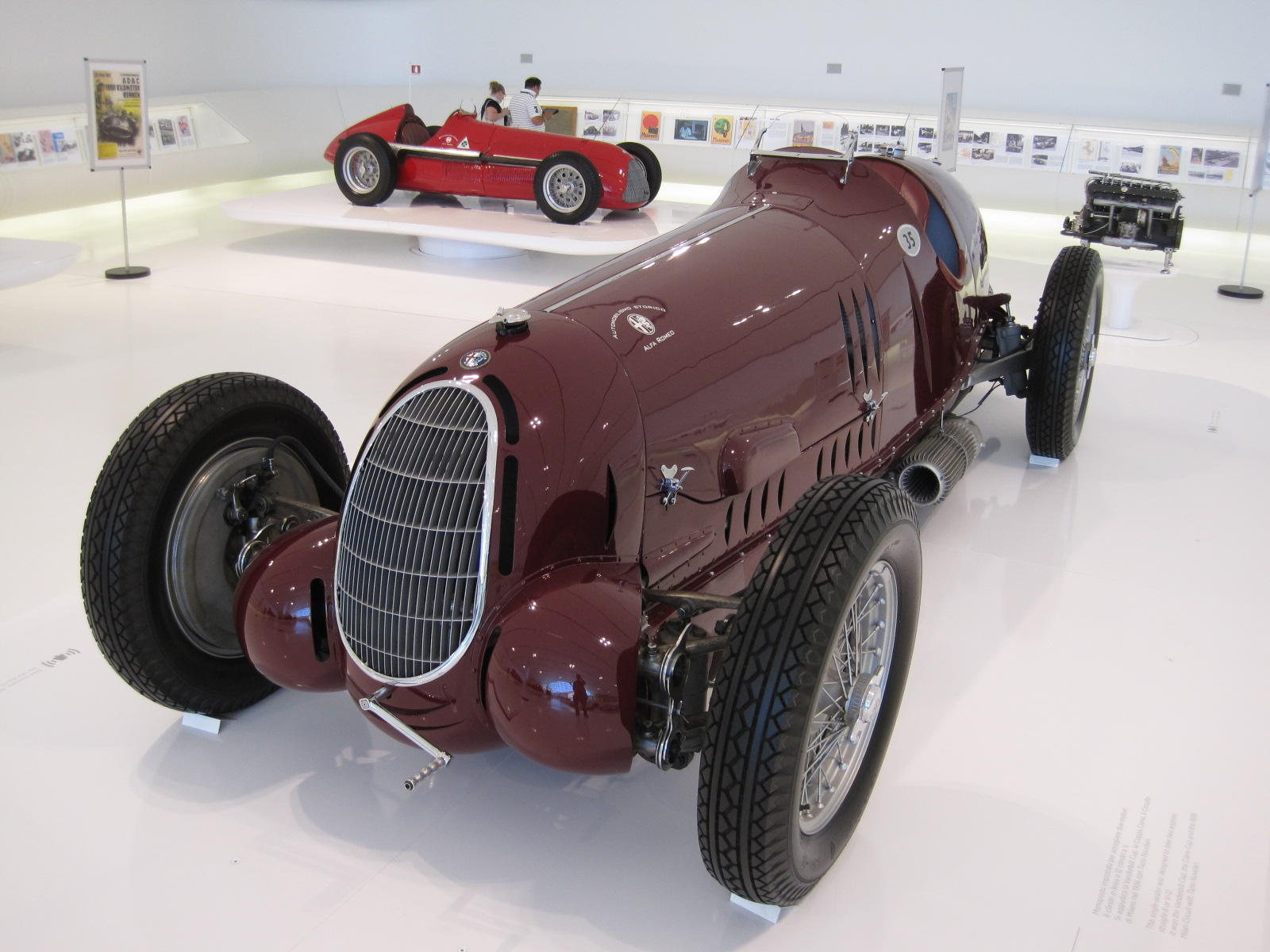
- An Alfa Romeo 12C-36

Overview
- Manufacturer: Alfa Romeo
- Production: 1936-1937
- Designer: Vittorio Jano

Body and chassis
- Class: Grand Prix 750 kg
- Layout: FR layout

Powertrain
- Engine: Roots supercharged 4.1 L 4064 cc 60° V12; 370 bhp at 5800 rpm (12C-36); Roots supercharged 4.5 L 4495 cc 60° V12; 430 bhp at 5800 rpm (12C-37)
- Transmission: 4-speed manual transmission

Dimensions
- Curb weight: 818 kg (1804 lb) (12C-36); 808 kg (1782 lb) (12C-37)

Chronology
- Predecessor: Alfa Romeo 8C-35
- Successor: Alfa Romeo Tipo 308; Alfa Romeo Tipo 312; Alfa Romeo Tipo 316

The Alfa Romeo 12C or Tipo C was a 12-cylinder Grand Prix car. The 12C-36 made its debut in Tripoli Grand Prix 1936, and the 12C-37 in Coppa Acerbo 1937. The 12C-36 was a Tipo C fitted with the new V12 instead of the 3.8 litre straight-eight of the 8C-35. The 12C-37 was a new car, with a lower chassis and an engine bored and stroked to 4475 cc, now with roller- instead of plain bearings and two smaller superchargers instead of a single large one. The car suffered poor handling, which could not be cured in time for the 1937 Italian GP, and thus was not successful. This is given as the reason for Vittorio Jano's resignation from Alfa Romeo at the end of 1937. The 12C-36 used the existing six Tipo C chassis. Four examples of the 12C-37 were built, although only two were actually assembled for the 1937 Coppa Acerbo and Italian GP. Early in 1938, the Tipo C (8C-35, 12C-36) chassis were modified into 308s, with the straight-eight engine fitted lower in the chassis and a completely new body. The four 12C-37 chassis were instead assembled into 312 (V12 downsized to 3-litre) and 316 (V16 obtained from two 158 engines fitted to a common crankcase) formula race cars.

== Main victories ==
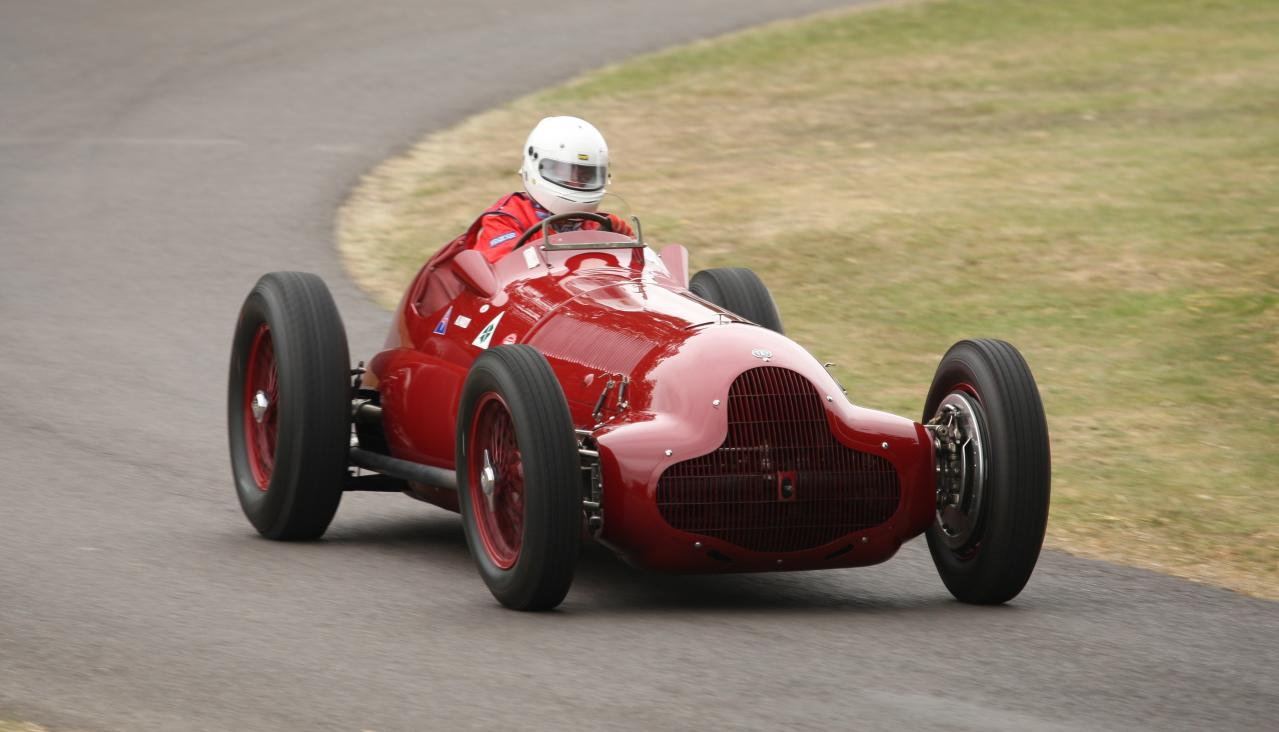
Alfa Romeo 12C-37

- 1936 Penya Rhin Grand Prix, Tazio Nuvolari
- 1936 Milan Grand Prix, Tazio Nuvolari
- 1936 Modena Grand Prix, Tazio Nuvolari
- 1936 Vanderbilt Cup, Tazio Nuvolari
- 1937 Milan Grand Prix, Tazio Nuvolari
- 1937 Valentino Grand Prix, Antonio Brivio
- 1937 Circuito di Napoli, Giuseppe Farina
- 1937 Genova Grand Prix, Carlo Felice Trossi

*All with 12C-36

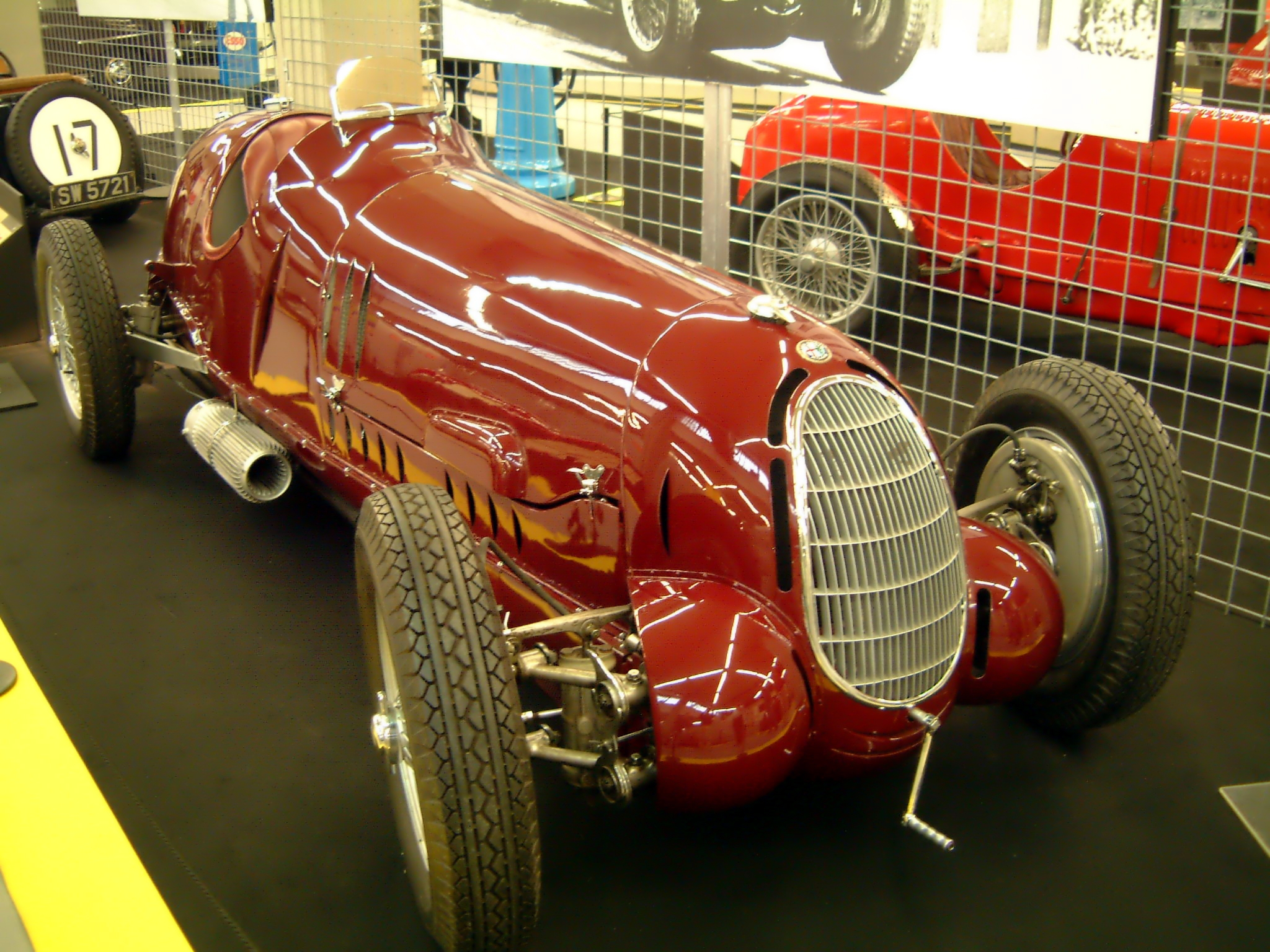
Alfa Romeo 12C-36

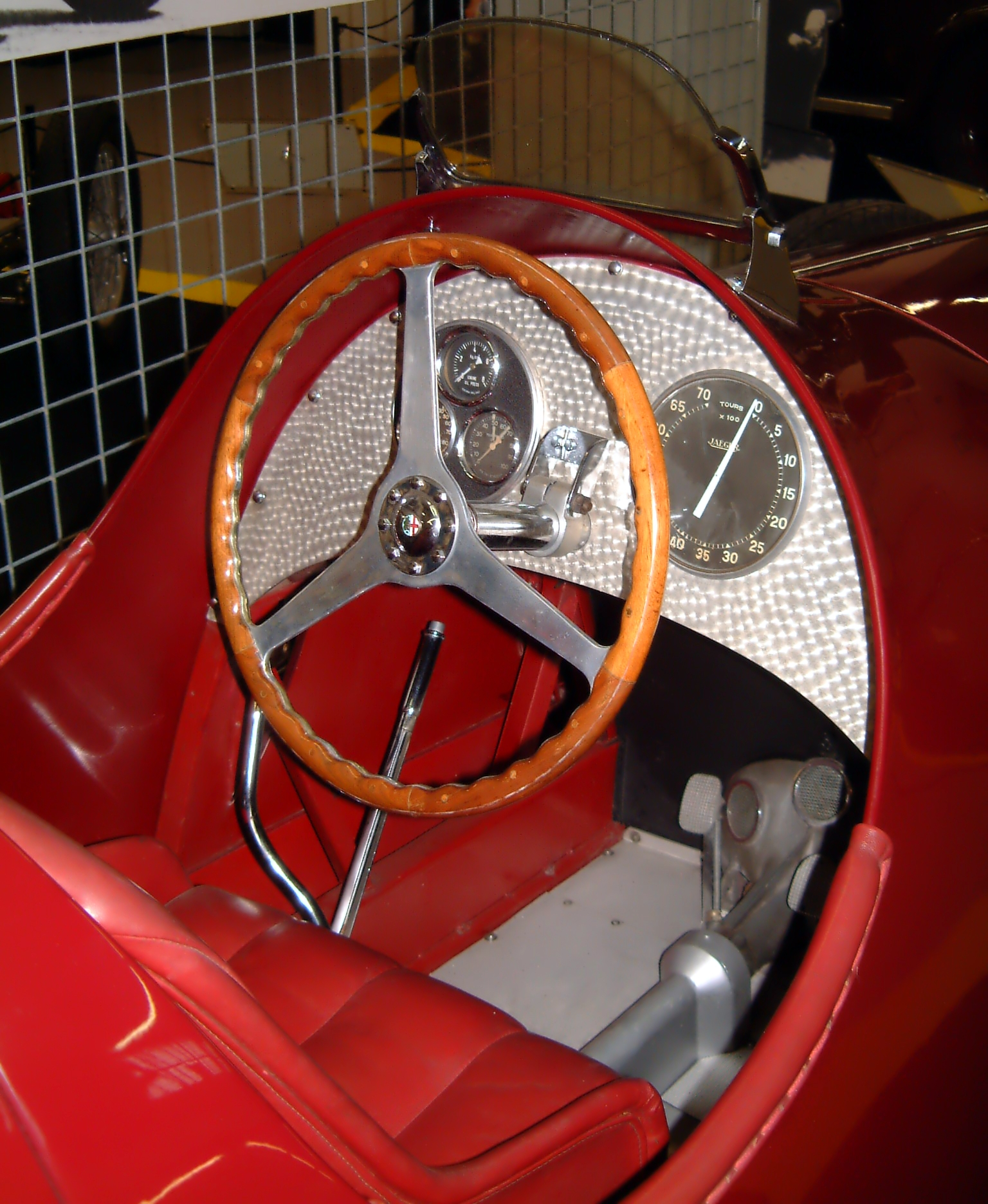
Cockpit of an Alfa Romeo 12C-36

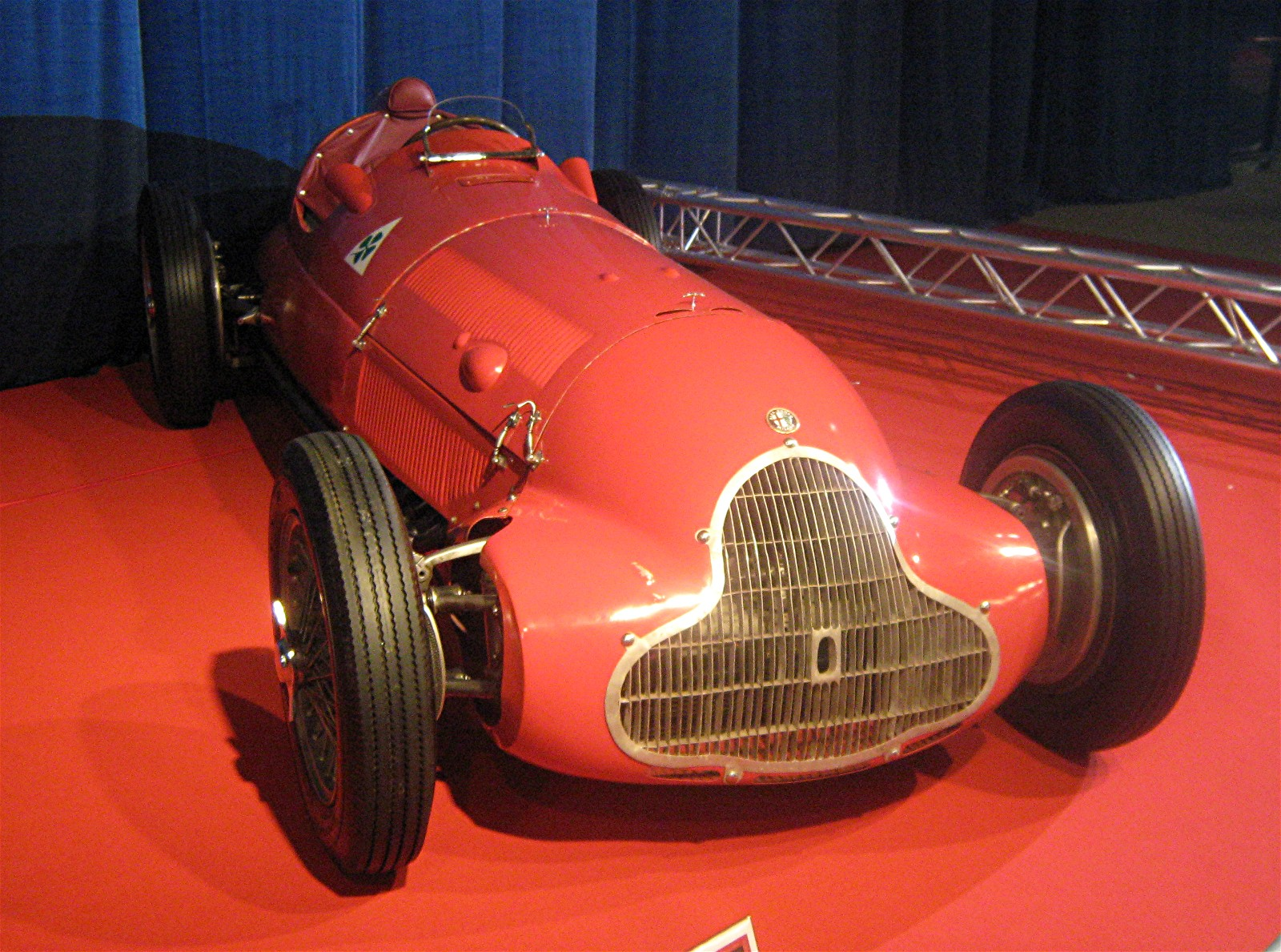
Alfa Romeo 12C-37

== Technical data ==
Technical data	8C-35	12C-36	12C-37
Engine:	8-cylinder in-line engine	12-cylinder 60° V-engine
displacement:	3822 cm^{3}	4064 cm^{3}	4495 cm^{3}
Bore x stroke:	78 x 100 mm	70 x 88mm	72 x 92 mm
Max power:	330 hp	370 hp	430 hp
Valve control:	2 overhead camshafts per cylinder row, 2 valves per cylinder
Compression :	8.0:1	7.1:1	7.3:1
Upload:	Roots compressor
Gearbox:	4-speed manual, transaxle
suspension front:	Individual type Dubonnet, coil springs
suspension rear:	Pendulum axle, transverse leaf spring
Brakes:	Hydraulic drum brakes
Chassis & body:	Crate beam frame with aluminiumbody		Tubular space frame with aluminium body
Wheelbase:	275 cm		280 cm
Dry weight:	750 kg	820 kg	810 kg
Top speed:	275 km/h	290 km/h	310 km/h
