= Alfa Romeo Tipo 308 =

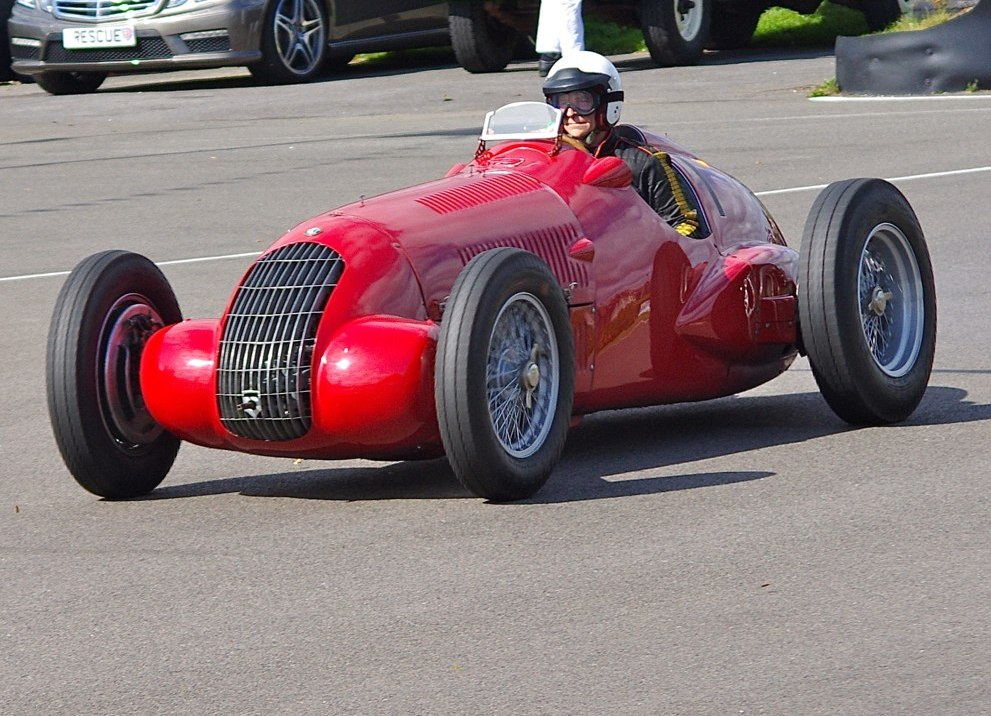
- Category: Grand Prix 3 litre
- Constructor: Alfa Romeo
- Designer(s): Gioacchino Colombo
- Production: 1938
- Predecessor: Alfa Romeo 12C
- Successor: Alfa Romeo 158

Technical specifications
- Chassis: channel section side members
- Suspension (front): independent with trailing links, coil springs, hydraulic dampers
- Suspension (rear): independent with swing axles, transverse leaf springs
- Engine: Alfa Romeo 2991 cc straight-8 Roots supercharged 295 bhp (220 kW) @ 6000 rpm front engined, longitudinally mounted
- Transmission: Alfa 4-speed manual
- Tyres: Pirelli

Competition history
- Notable entrants: Alfa Corse
- Notable drivers: Tazio Nuvolari; Luigi Villoresi; Jean-Pierre Wimille; Achille Varzi; Raymond Sommer; Óscar Alfredo Gálvez; Chico Landi
- Debut: April 1938 Pau Grand Prix

The Alfa Romeo Tipo 308 or 8C-308 is a Grand Prix racing car made for the 3 litre class in 1938. Only four cars were produced, actually modified from Tipo C with the engine mounted lower into the chassis and a slimmer body. The chassis was derived from the Tipo C and the engine from the 8C 2900. The 308 was engineered by Gioacchino Colombo under the control of Enzo Ferrari who was then in charge of Alfa's racing team, Alfa Corse. The car debuted at the Pau Grand Prix in 1938, where two cars were entered to race, one for Tazio Nuvolari and the other for Luigi Villoresi. Both drivers had to withdraw from competition, however Nuvolari had by then set a lap record. The next race was the Tripoli Grand Prix. The new 312 (3-litre, 12 cylinders) and 316 (3-litre, 16 cylinders) were entered, but they had engine trouble during practice and Clemente Biondetti took the start at the wheel of the 308 held in reserve. He failed to finish, while Hermann Lang, driving a Mercedes-Benz W154, was the winner. In this race, Eugenio Siena, driving a 312, was killed after hitting a wall.

In the 1938 Mille Miglia, Clemente Biondetti and Carlo Pintacuda took the first two places. Biondetti's car used a 300 bhp (220 kW) Tipo 308 engine, while Pintacuda's used a 225 bhp (168 kW) 2900B.

In 1938 and 1939, Raymond Sommer won a couple of hillclimb competitions at La Turbie with 308; Jean-Pierre Wimille won a couple of races in Europe in the 1940s. One of the cars was brought to Argentina where it gathered some success and victories in the hands of Óscar Alfredo Gálvez. The car that Gálvez used in Argentina is now in the Juan Manuel Fangio museum.

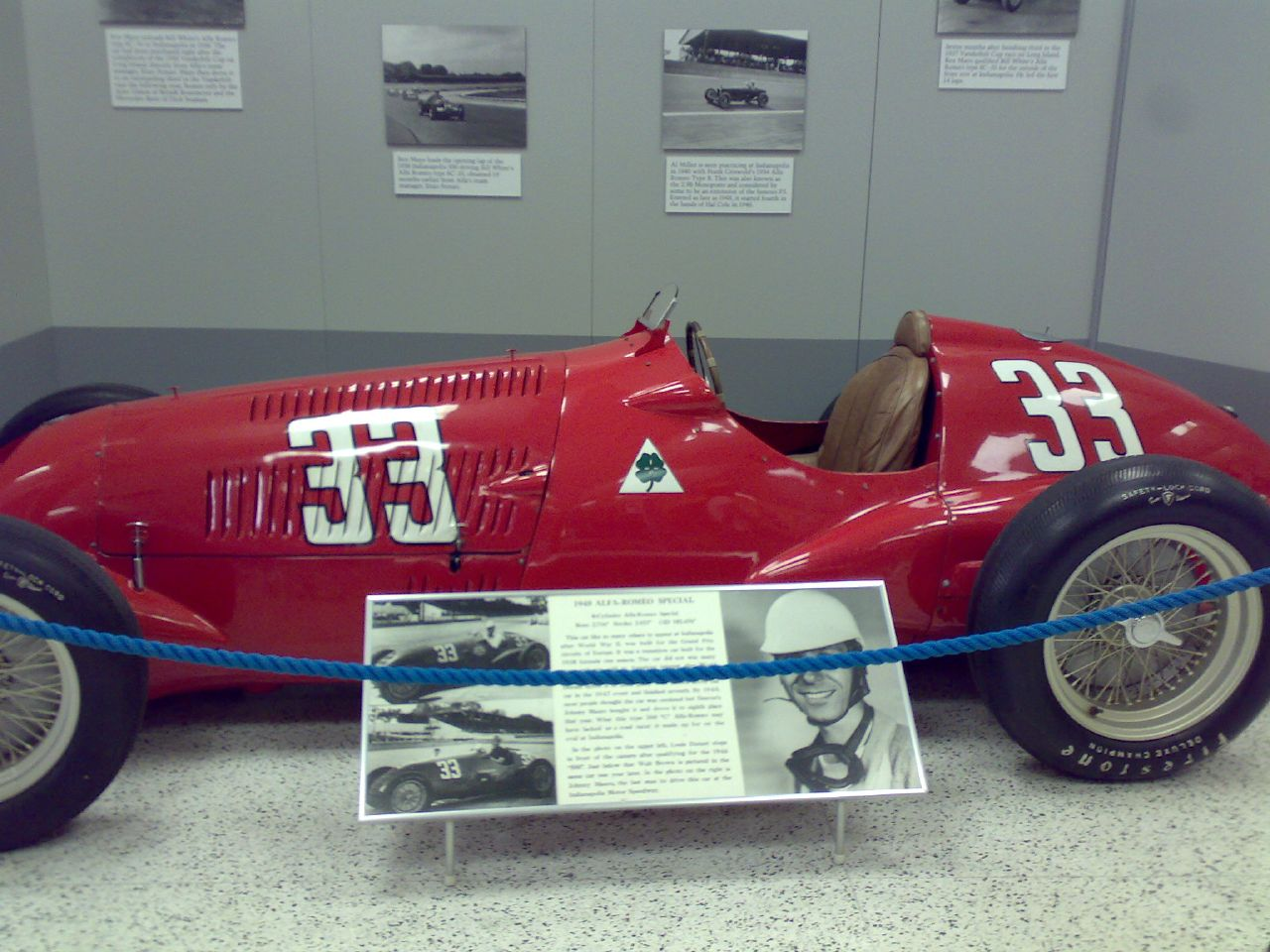
Johnny Mauro Alfa Romeo 308

One of the cars was sold to the US after World War II and Louis Durant drove it to 6th place in the 1946 Indianapolis 500; the next year it placed 7th with Walt Brown. In 1948, Johnny Mauro drove the car to 8th place; this car is now located in the Indianapolis Motor Speedway Hall of Fame Museum. It is probably the same car that was also used in the 1940 Indianapolis 500, which was Raymond Sommer's ex car.

Overall Alfa Romeo's 3 litre formula cars (Tipo 308, 312 and 316) were not a great success. Instead, the new car for the 1500 cc class, the 158 voiturette, designed in 1937 and first raced at the Coppa Ciano in August 1938, proved much more successful.

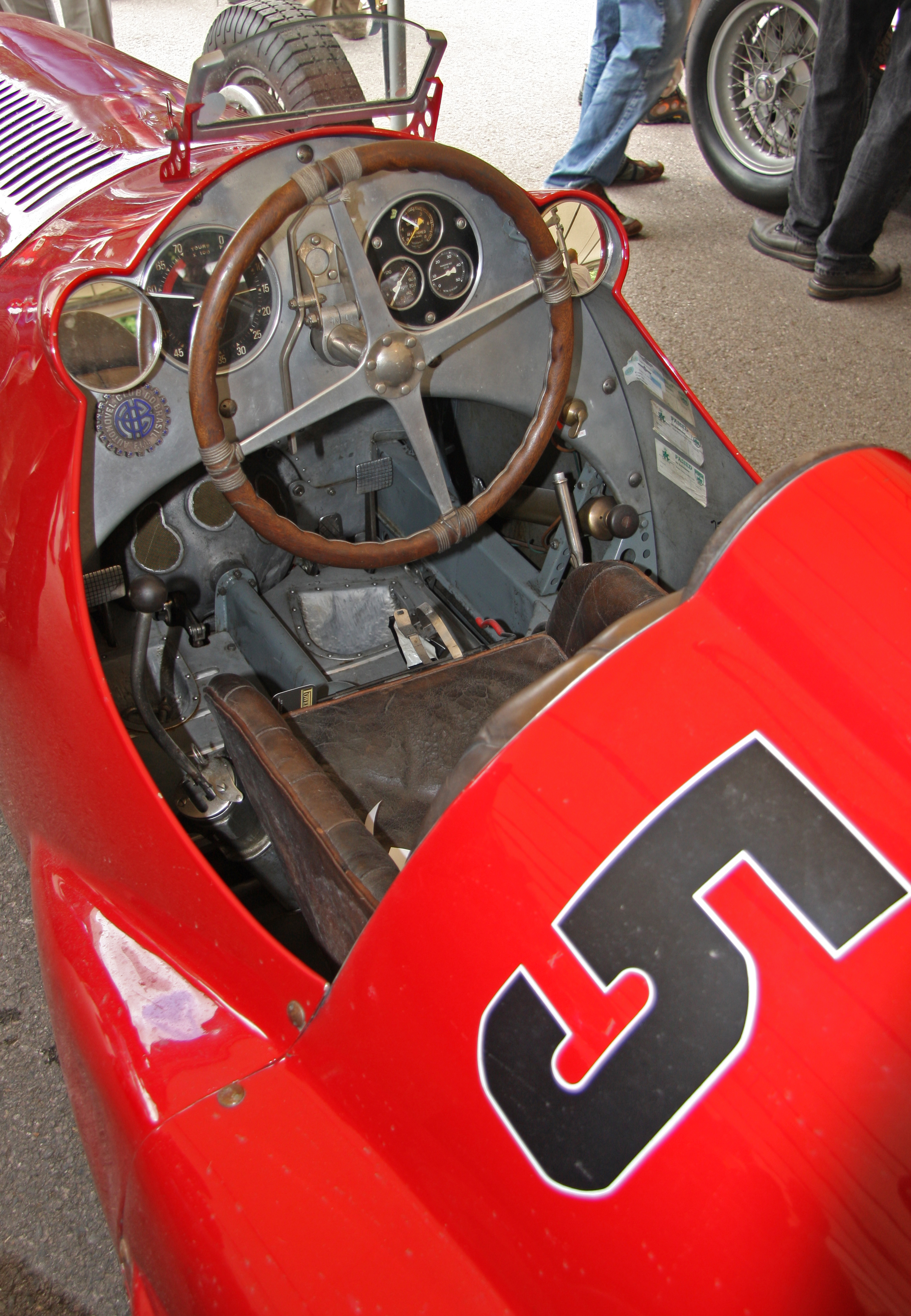
Tipo 308 monoposto.

== Technical Information ==
Technical data	Alfa Romeo Tipo 308
engine	8-cylinder in-line engine
displacement	2991 cm^{3} / 182.5 cu in
bore × stroke	69mm × 100mm
compression ratio	6.1 : 1
Power at 1/min	295 hp / 220 kW at 6000
valve control	two overhead camshafts / 2 valves per cylinder
mixture preparation	2 Weber carburetors, dual Roots blowers
cooling	Water
transmission	4-speed transmission, not synchronized (rear-wheel drive)
brakes	hydraulically actuated drum braken on all wheels
Front suspension	Cross arms, coil springs, hydraulic dampers
rear suspension	pendulum axle, semi-elliptical transverse leaf springs, hydraulic telescopic dampers, friction dampers
body and frame	Aluminum body on ladder frame
Wheelbase	2750mm
Track width front / rear	1350mm / 1350mm
front tire size	unknown
Rear tire size	unknown
Dimensions L × W × H	4000mm × -mm × 1160mm
curb weight (without driver)	870 kg
tank capacity	unknown
fuel consumption	unknown
top speed	260 km/h (162 mph)

== Main victories ==
- 1938 Grand Prix Rio de Janeiro, Carlo Maria Pintacuda
- 1939 Circuit des Remparts - Angoulême, Raymond Sommer
- 1946 Grand Prix de Bourgogne, Jean-Pierre Wimille
- 1946 Grand Prix du Roussillon - Circuit des Platanes - Perpignan, Jean-Pierre Wimille
- 1947 Grand Prix de Rosario, Achille Varzi
- 1948 Grand Prix São Paulo, Jean-Pierre Wimille
- 1949 Buenos Aires Grand Prix, Óscar Alfredo Gálvez

== Indianapolis 500 ==
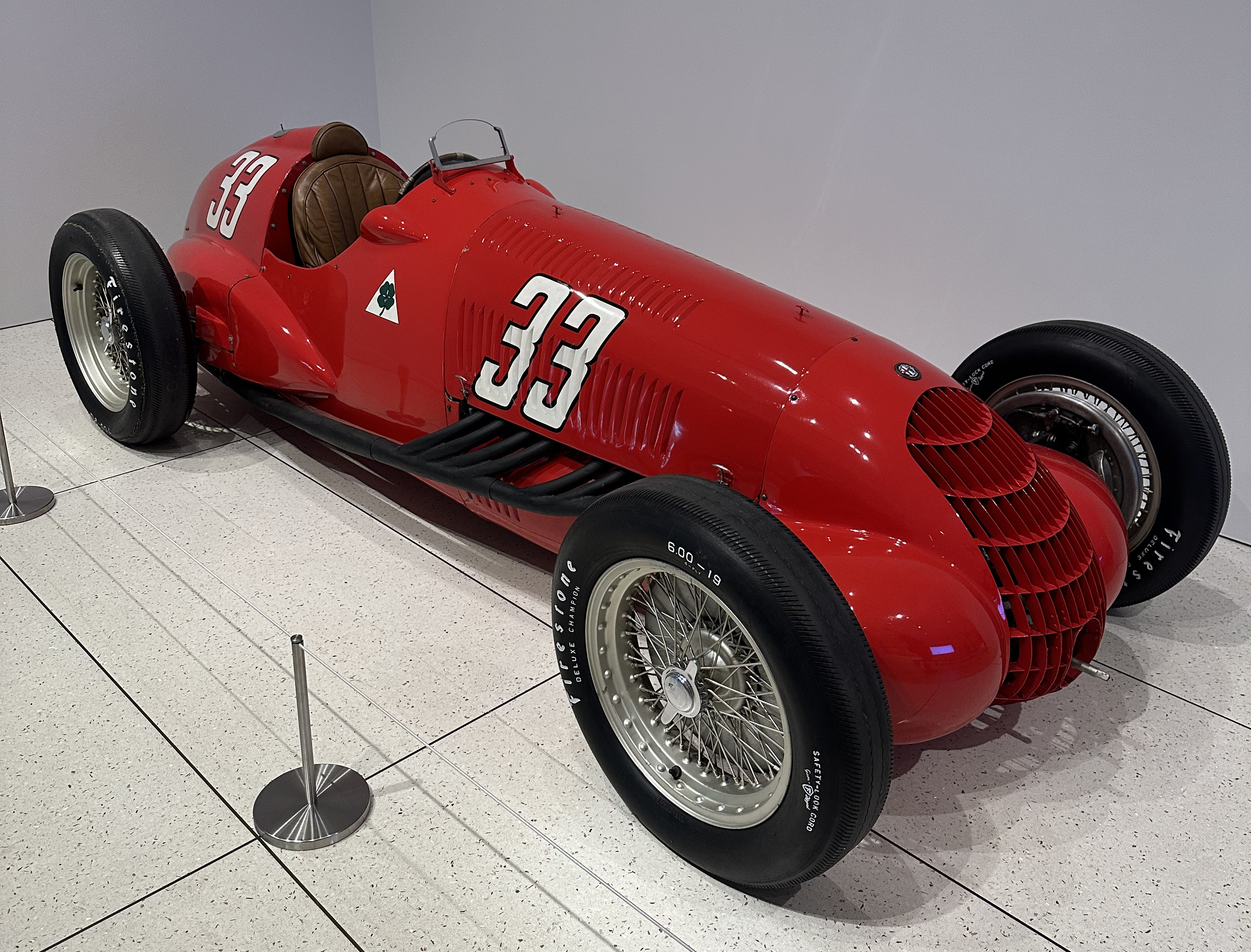
The Alfa Romeo 8C–308 used at the Indianapolis 500 on display at the Indianapolis Museum of Art at Newfields in December 2024.

- 1940 Chet Miller, 17th
- 1946 Louis Durant, 6th
- 1947 Walt Brown, 7th
- 1948 Johnny Mauro, 8th

== See also ==
- Maserati 8CTF
