= 1950 Bari Grand Prix =

- Non-championship race in the 1950 Formula One season
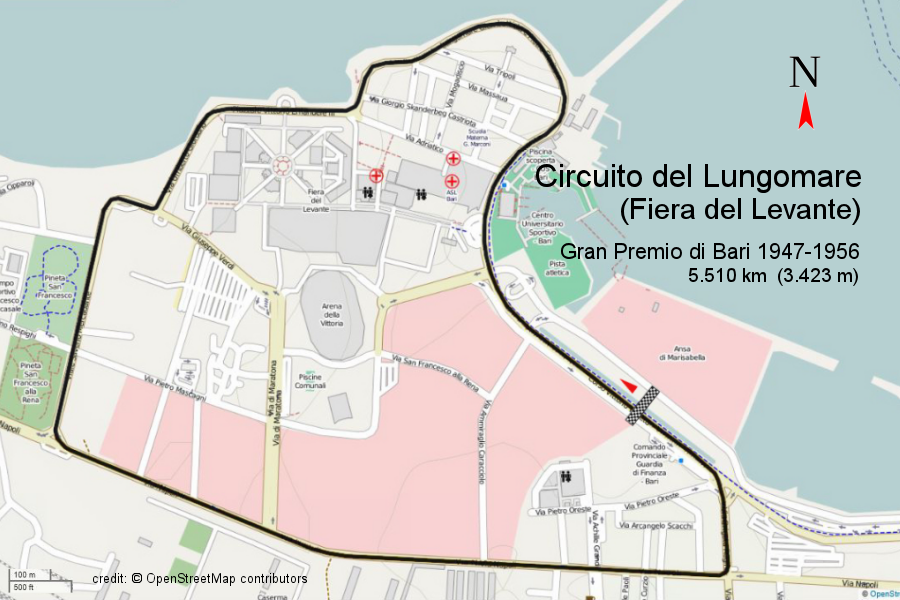

Race details
- Date: 9 July 1950
- Official name: IV Gran Premio di Bari
- Location: Lungomare Circuit, Bari, Italy
- Course length: 8.433 km (5.240 miles)
- Distance: 60 laps, 505.968 km (314.394 miles)

Fastest lap
Driver	(Argentina) Juan Manuel Fangio	Alfa Romeo
- Time: 2:26.5

Podium
First	(Italy) Giuseppe Farina	Alfa Romeo
Second	(Argentina) Juan Manuel Fangio	Alfa Romeo
Third	(United Kingdom) Stirling Moss	HWM-Alta

The 1950 Bari Grand Prix was a non-championship Formula One motor race held on 9 July 1950 at the Lungomare Circuit, in Bari, Italy. It was the sixth race of the 1950 Formula One season. The 60-lap race was won by Alfa Romeo driver Giuseppe Farina. Juan Manuel Fangio finished second, also in an Alfa Romeo, and Stirling Moss third in an HWM-Alta.

== Results ==
Pos	No.	Driver	Entrant	Constructor	Time/Retired
1	16	(Italy) Giuseppe Farina	Alfa Romeo SpA	Alfa Romeo	2.34:29.6
2	2	(Argentina) Juan Manuel Fangio	Alfa Romeo SpA	Alfa Romeo	+ 46.4 s
3	20	(United Kingdom) Stirling Moss	John Heath	HWM-Alta	58 laps
4	18	(France) Pierre Levegh	Pierre Levegh	Talbot-Lago	58 laps
5	24	(Italy) Franco Cortese	Franco Cortese	Ferrari	58 laps
6	4	(Italy) Clemente Biondetti	Luigi de Filippis	Maserati	55 laps
7	38	(Italy) Dorino Serafini	Scuderia Ferrari	Ferrari	55 laps
8	14	(Belgium) Johnny Claes	Ecurie Belge	Talbot-Lago	45 laps
9	46	(Italy) Arnulfo Bilancia	Arnulfo Bilancia	Maserati	43 laps
Ret	30	(Italy) Luigi Villoresi (Italy) Alberto Ascari	Scuderia Ferrari	Ferrari	Rear axle
Ret	6	(France) Georges Grignard	Georges Grignard	Talbot-Lago	Mechanical
Ret	28	(Switzerland) Rudolf Fischer	John Heath	HWM-Alta	Carburettor float
Ret	12	(Italy) Alberto Ascari	Scuderia Ferrari	Ferrari	Rear axle
Ret	10	(United Kingdom) John Heath (United Kingdom) Lance Macklin	John Heath	HWM-Alta	Differential
Ret	26	(Thailand) Prince Bira	Enrico Platé	Maserati	Mechanical
DNA	8	(Brazil) Chico Landi	Chico Landi	Ferrari	
DNA	22	(Italy) Felice Bonetto	Scuderia Milano	Maserati-Speluzzi	
DNA	32	(France) Louis Rosier	Ecurie Rosier	Talbot-Lago	Car not repaired
DNA	34	(Monaco) Louis Chiron	Officine Alfieri Maserati	Maserati	Car not repaired
DNA	36	(Italy) Franco Rol	Officine Alfieri Maserati	Maserati	Car not repaired
DNA	40	(France) Philippe Étancelin	Philippe Étancelin	Talbot-Lago	Driver injured
DNA	42	(United Kingdom) Leslie Brooke	Leslie Brooke	Maserati	
DNA	44	(Italy) Piero Carini	Piero Carini	Maserati	

Previous race: 1950 British Empire Trophy	Formula One non-championship races 1950 season	Next race: 1950 Jersey Road Race
Previous race: 1949 Bari Grand Prix	Bari Grand Prix	Next race: 1951 Bari Grand Prix
