= Alfa Romeo Tipo 312 =

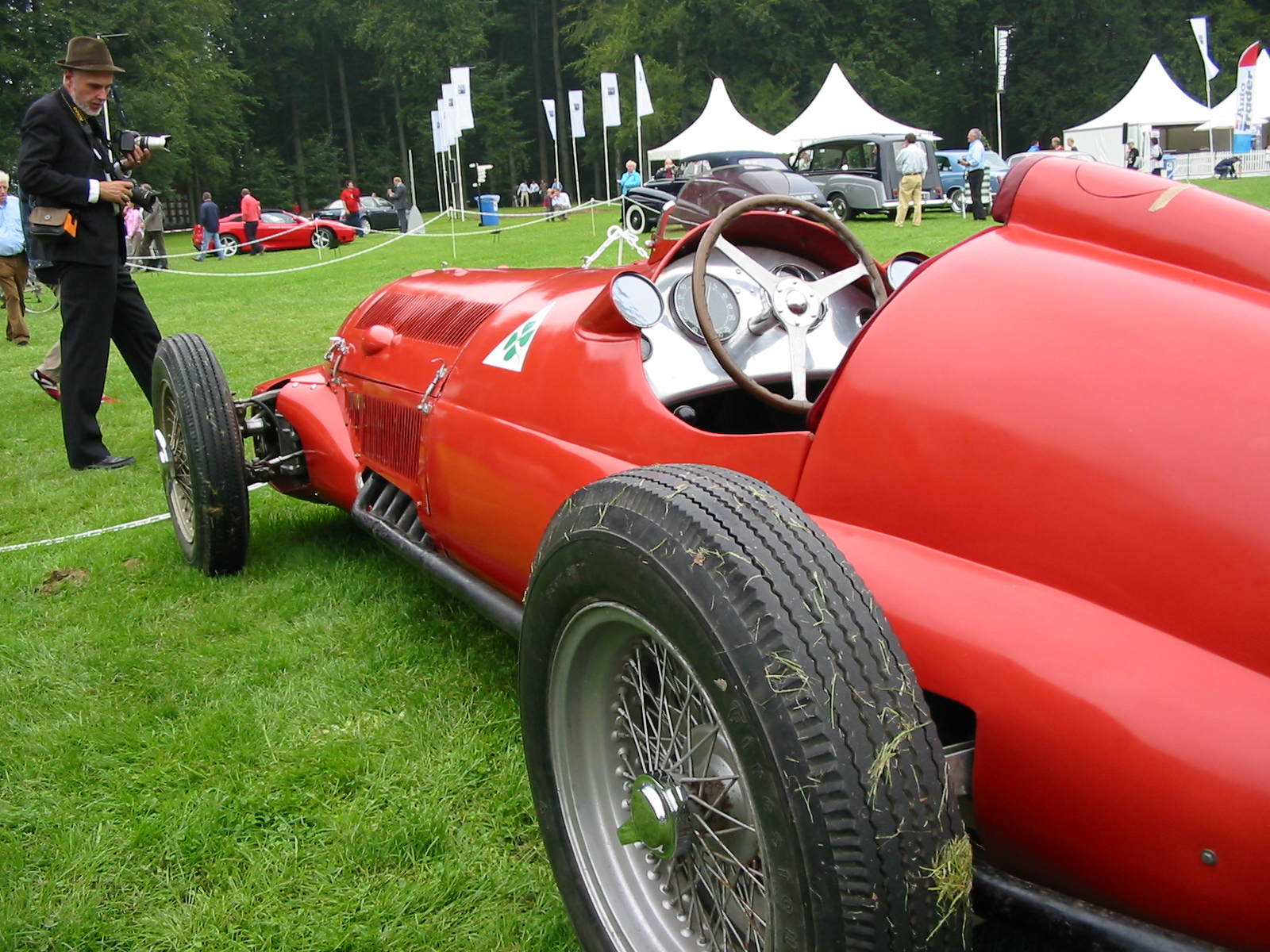
- Category: Grand Prix 3 litre
- Constructor: Alfa Romeo
- Designer: Gioacchino Colombo
- Production: 1938

Technical specifications
- Chassis: Aluminum tube chassis
- Suspension (front): independent, transverse leaf spring and two longitudinal guides
- Suspension (rear): independent, transverse leaf spring with hydraulic shock absorbers
- Engine: Alfa Romeo 2995 cc V12 supercharged 320 hp (239 kW) @ 6500 rpm front engined, longitudinally mounted
- Transmission: Alfa Four-speed Manual

Competition history
- Notable entrants: Alfa Corse
- Notable drivers: Raymond Sommer; Giuseppe Farina; Eugenio Siena; Clemente Biondetti; Carlo Pintacuda; Jean-Pierre Wimille; Gianfranco Comotti; Piero Taruffi; Pietro Ghersi
- Debut: 1938 Tripoli Grand Prix
| Races | Wins |
|---|---|
| 18 | 0 |

The Alfa Romeo Tipo 312, 312 or 12C-312 was a 3-litre formula racing car that was used in the 1938 Grand Prix season; drivers were Raymond Sommer, Giuseppe Farina, Eugenio Siena, Clemente Biondetti, Carlo Pintacuda, Jean-Pierre Wimille, Gianfranco Comotti, Piero Taruffi and Pietro Ghersi.

Tipo 312 was one of three Alfa Romeo cars designed for the new rules in 1938, which differed mainly by the engine; the other two cars were the Alfa Romeo Tipo 308 with straight-8 engine and Alfa Romeo Tipo 316 with a V16 engine. The car was based on unsuccessful Alfa Romeo 12C-37; it was made easier to control than its predecessor. The engine in 312 is 3-litre 60° V-12 with roots supercharger, 2 valves/cyl, 2,995 cc (182.8 cu in) capacity 66 mm × 73 mm (2.60 in × 2.87 in) produced 320 bhp (239 kW) at 6500 rpm; it was more powerful than 308 but it was still not really competitive with German rivals.

== Technical Data ==
| Technical data | Alfa Romeo Tipo 312 |
|---|---|
| Engine: | 12-cylinder 60° V-engine |
| displacement: | 2995 cm^{3} |
| Bore x stroke: | 66 x 73mm |
| Max power: | 320 hp |
| Valve control: | 2 overhead camshafts per cylinder row, 2 valves per cylinder |
| Upload: | Roots compressor |
| Gearbox: | 4-speed manual, transaxle |
| suspension front: | Individual type Dubonnet, coil springs |
| suspension rear: | Pendulum axis, transverse leaf spring |
| Brakes: | Hydraulic drum brakes |
| Chassis & body: | Tubular space frame with aluminium body |
| Wheelbase: | 280 cm |
| Dry weight: | About 870 kg |
