= Coppa Ciano =

Former automobile race in Italy

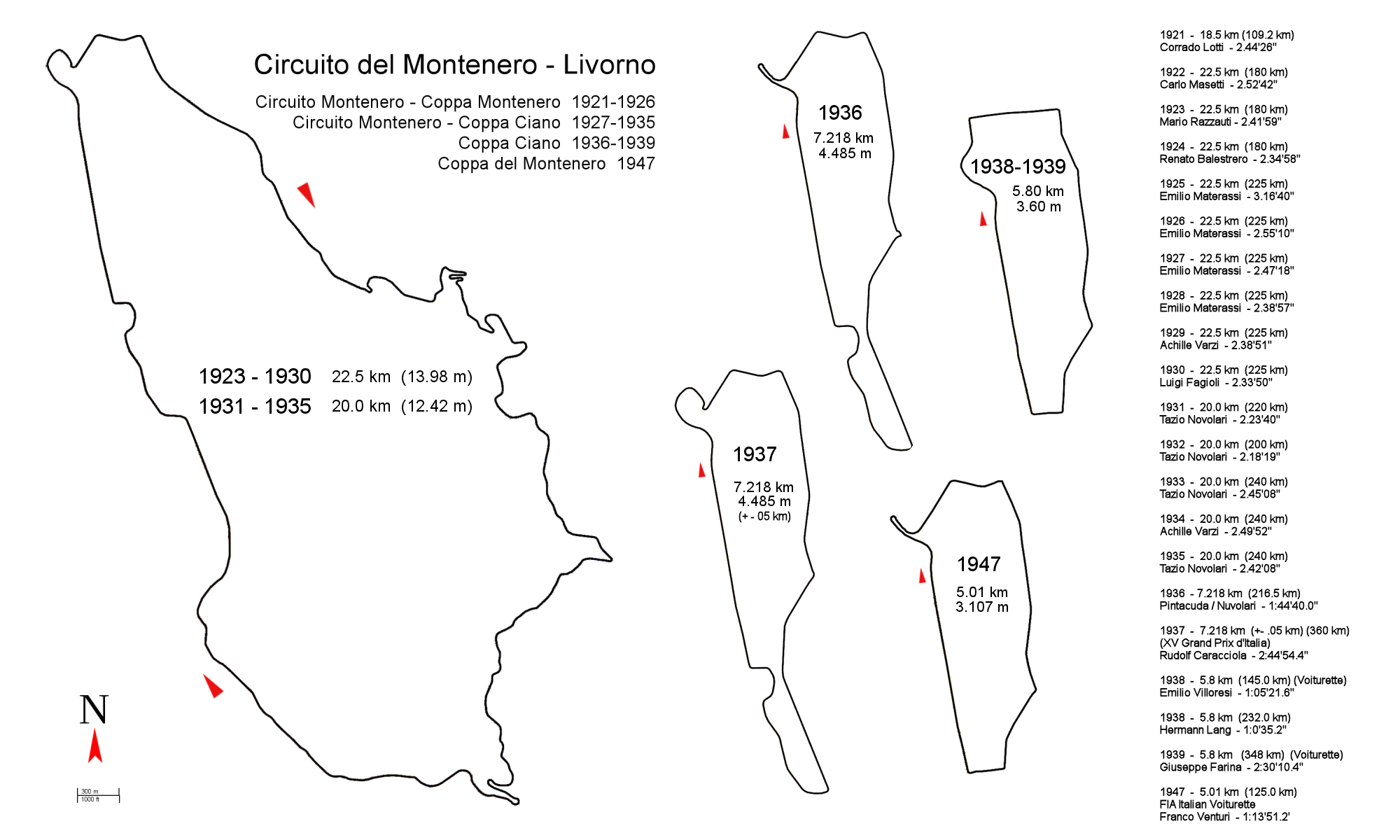
Circuito Montenero - Coppa Ciano

The Coppa Ciano was an automobile race held in Italy. Originally referred to as Coppa Montenero or Circuito Montenero, the Coppa Ciano name was officially in use between 1927 and 1939.

== History ==
Coppa Ciano poster, 1931.

During the years immediately following World War I several road circuits were created in Italy. These included the Montenero Circuit at Livorno, which became home for the annual Coppa Montenero from its inauguration in 1921. In the beginning it was only a local affair and the organizers quickly found themselves in financial troubles. In 1923 the event was taken over by the Automobile Club of Italy and the future was secured.

In 1927, the Livorno-born politician Costanzo Ciano donated a victory trophy: the Coppa Ciano. At first, this was awarded to the victor in a separate sports car race, run within a week of the Coppa Montenero. In 1929, however, the Coppa Ciano was merged into the main event and at the same time became the name most often used.

The driver Emilio Materassi won 4 years in a row 1925-1928 and earned the nickname "King of Montenero".

In the 1930s, Italian Hall of Fame driver Tazio Nuvolari won this race five times, more than any other driver. In his 1936 victory he made his way through the field, beating the otherwise superior German cars. This victory was one of the reasons leading to the Italian Grand Prix being held at the Montenero circuit in 1937, instead of the usual venue, Monza.

The 1939 race was run to Voiturette regulations and became the last before World War II stopped all racing for many years. In 1947 the 20th and final edition of the Coppa Montenero was run, with 1500 cc unsupercharged cars. At that point, due to Costanzo Ciano's connections with the now abolished Fascist regime, it was no longer called Coppa Ciano.

== Coppa Ciano by year ==
Year	Race Name	Dist.	Circuit	Formula	Driver	Manufacturer	Time	Report
1927	VII Circuito Montenero	225 km	22.5 km	Formula Libre	(Italy) Emilio Materassi	Bugatti T35C	2:45:18	Report
1927	I Coppa Ciano (Sport)	225 km	22.5 km	Sports car	(Italy) Attilio Marinoni	Alfa Romeo 6C-1500	2:52:42	Report
1928	VIII Circuito Montenero	225 km	22.5 km	Grand Prix	(Italy) Emilio Materassi	Talbot 700	2:38:57	Report
1928	II Coppa Ciano (Sport)	225 km	22.5 km	Sports car	(Italy) Mario Razzauti	Alfa Romeo 6C-1500	2:52:42	Report
1929	III Coppa Ciano (Circuito Montenero)	225 km	22.5 km	Grand Prix	(Italy) Achille Varzi	Alfa Romeo P2	2:38:51	Report
1930	IV Coppa Ciano (Circuito Montenero)	225 km	22.5 km	Grand Prix	(Italy) Luigi Fagioli	Maserati 26M	2:33:50	Report
1931	V Coppa Ciano (Circuito Montenero)	200 km	20.0 km	Grand Prix	(Italy) Tazio Nuvolari	Alfa Romeo 8C 2300 Monza	2:23:40	Report
1932	VI Coppa Ciano (Circuito Montenero)	200 km	20.0 km	Grand Prix	(Italy) Tazio Nuvolari	Alfa Romeo Tipo-B 'P3'	2:18:19	Report
1933	VII Coppa Ciano (Circuito Montenero)	240 km	20.0 km	Grand Prix	(Italy) Tazio Nuvolari	Maserati 8CM	2:45:08	Report
1934	VIII Coppa Ciano (Circuito Montenero)	240 km	20.0 km	Grand Prix	(Italy) Achille Varzi	Alfa Romeo Tipo-B 'P3'	2:49:52	Report
1935	IX Coppa Ciano (Circuito Montenero)	240 km	20.0 km	Grand Prix	(Italy) Tazio Nuvolari	Alfa Romeo Tipo-B 'P3'	2:42:08	Report
1936	X Coppa Ciano (Circuito Montenero)	216.5 km	7.218 km	Grand Prix	(Italy) Nuvolari / Pintacuda	Alfa Romeo 8C-35	1:44:54.4	Report
1937	XI Coppa Ciano (Gran Premio d'Italia) *	360.0 km	7.218 km	Grand Prix	(Germany) Rudolf Caracciola	Mercedes-Benz W125	2:44:54.4	Report
1938	XII Coppa Ciano (Circuito Montenero)	232.0 km	5.80 km	Grand Prix	(Germany) Hermann Lang	Mercedes-Benz W154	1:00:35.2	Report
1938	XII Coppa Ciano (Circuito Montenero)	145.0 km	5.80 km	Voiturette	(Italy) Emilio Villoresi	Maserati 6CM	1:05:21.6	Report
1939	XIII Coppa Ciano (Circuito Montenero)	348.0 km	5.80 km	Grand Prix	(Italy) Giuseppe Farina	Alfa Romeo 158	2:30:10.4	Report
* (AIACR European Driver Championship round) - Sources:

== See also ==
- Coppa Acerbo
