= Giuseppe Farina =

Italian racing driver (1906–1966)

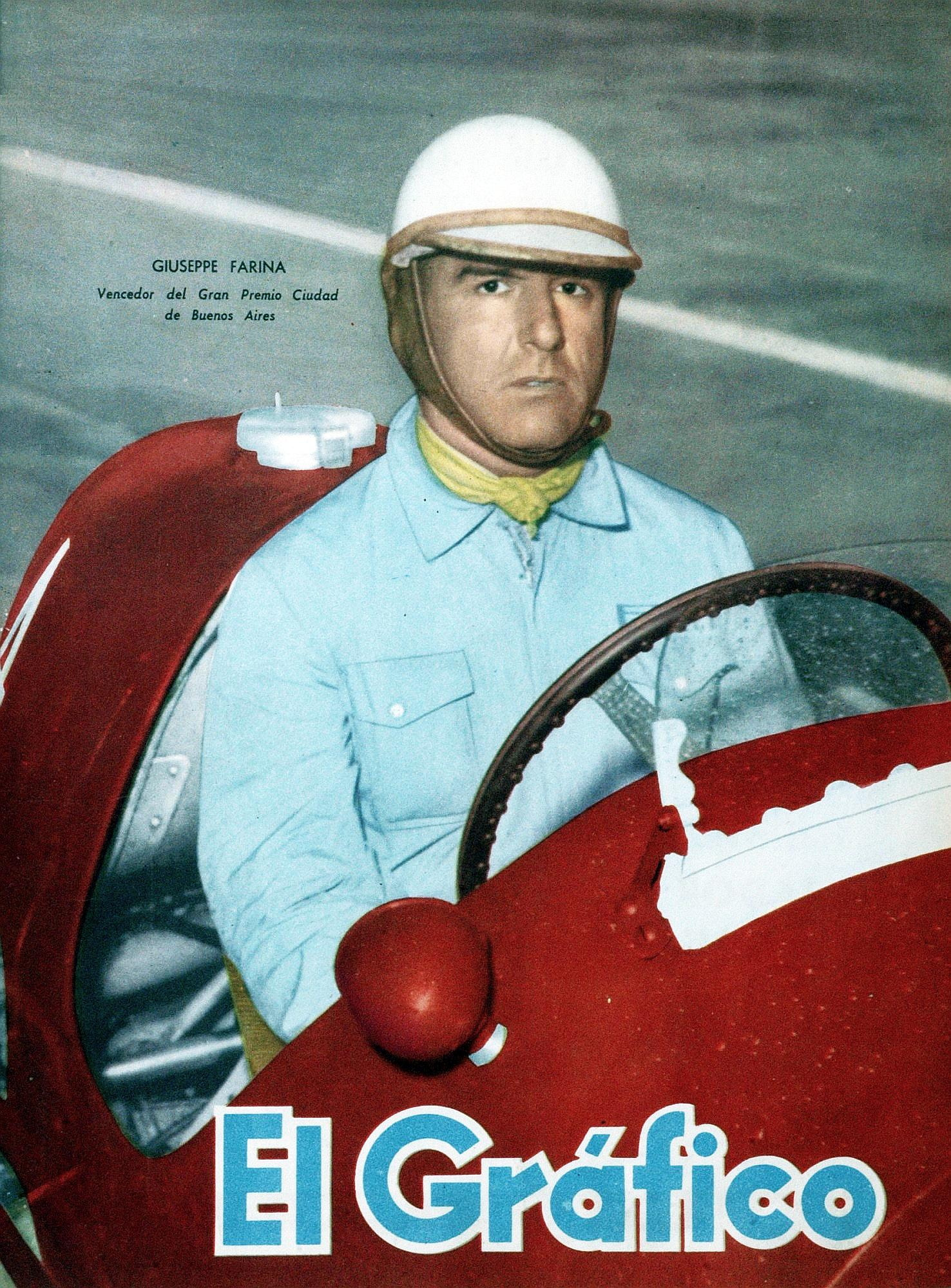
- Farina in 1953, pictured on the cover of El Gráfico
- Born: Emilio Giuseppe Farina; 30 October 1906; Turin, Piedmont, Kingdom of Italy
- Died: 30 June 1966 (aged 59); Aiguebelle, Savoie, France
- Cause of death: Single vehicle road collision

Formula One World Championship career
- Nationality: (Italy) Italian
- Active years: 1950–1956
- Team(s): Alfa Romeo, Ferrari
- Entries: 35 (33 starts)
- Championships: 1 (1950)
- Wins: 5
- Podiums: 20 (Note: Including both second and third place at the 1955 Argentine Grand Prix.)
- Career points: 115 1/3 (127 1/3) (Note: Up until 1990, not all points scored by a driver contributed to their final World Championship tally (see list of points scoring systems for more information). Numbers without parentheses are Championship points; numbers in parentheses are total points scored.)
- Pole positions: 5
- Fastest laps: 5
- First entry: 1950 British Grand Prix
- First win: 1950 British Grand Prix
- Last win: 1953 German Grand Prix
- Last entry: 1956 Indianapolis 500

Emilio Giuseppe "Nino" Farina (Note: Also known as Giuseppe Antonio Farina.) (Italian pronunciation: [dʒuˈzɛppe ˈniːno faˈriːna]; 30 October 1906 – 30 June 1966) was an Italian racing driver, who competed in Formula One from 1950 to 1956. Farina won the Formula One World Drivers' Championship in its inaugural 1950 season with Alfa Romeo, and won five Grands Prix across seven seasons.

Born in Turin, Farina was the son of Giovanni Farina, founder of Stabilimenti Farina. Aged nine, he started driving a two-cylinder Temperino, eventually progressing to hillclimbing in 1925. A protégé of Tazio Nuvolari, Farina attracted the attention of Enzo Ferrari in his early career, who signed him to Ferrari in 1936. He immediately impressed, finishing runner-up at the Mille Miglia driving an Alfa Romeo 8C. (Note: Ferrari initially competed as an Alfa Romeo customer team from 1929 to 1939.) Farina took his maiden Grand Prix win at the Naples Grand Prix in 1937, winning three consecutive Italian Championships until 1939, the latter two with Alfa Corse. He earned notoriety for his involvement in the fatal accidents of Marcel Lehoux and László Hartmann in 1936 and 1938, respectively. Farina won the Tripoli Grand Prix in 1939, his last victory before World War II.

After the war, Farina returned to Alfa Corse, winning the Nations Grand Prix in 1946. Amongst four major victories in 1948, Farina won the Monaco Grand Prix. He signed for Alfa Romeo in 1950, making his Formula One debut at the series-opening British Grand Prix, which he won ahead of Luigi Fagioli. Amidst a title charge by teammate Juan Manuel Fangio, Farina took further wins at the Swiss and Italian Grands Prix, becoming the first World Drivers' Champion. Although winning the Belgian Grand Prix in 1951, Farina was unable to halt the ascent of Fangio and Alberto Ascari. He joined Ascari at Ferrari in 1952, but was unable to hinder his dominance over the next two seasons. Farina took his final victory in Formula One at the German Grand Prix in 1953.

After a string of injuries during 1954, Farina retired from Formula One after Ascari's fatal accident in 1955. Amongst five race wins, five pole positions, five fastest laps and 20 podiums, Farina also won 11 non-championship races in Formula One. Aged 49, he returned for the Indianapolis 500 in 1956 with Kurtis Kraft, but was unable to qualify. Farina withdrew from the 1957 Indianapolis 500, after the death of teammate Keith Andrews during practice. In sportscar racing, Farina won the Nürburgring 1000 km, the 24 Hours of Spa and the 12 Hours of Casablanca, all in 1953 with Ferrari and the former two as part of the inaugural World Sportscar Championship. On his way to spectate the 1966 French Grand Prix, Farina died after he lost control of his Lotus Cortina in the French Alps.

== Early years ==
Born in Turin, Farina was the son of Giovanni Carlo Farina (1884–1957), who founded the Stabilimenti Farina coachbuilder. He began driving a two-cylinder Temperino, at the age of just nine. Farina became a Doctor of Political Science (although some sources say engineering); he also excelled at skiing, football and athletics. He cut short a career as a cavalry officer with the Italian army to fulfil a different ambition: motor racing.

While still at university Farina purchased his first car, a second-hand Alfa Romeo, and ran it in the 1925 Aosta-Gran San Bernardo Hillclimb. While trying to beat his father, he crashed, breaking his shoulder and receiving facial cuts, establishing a trend that continued throughout his crash-prone career. His father finished fourth.

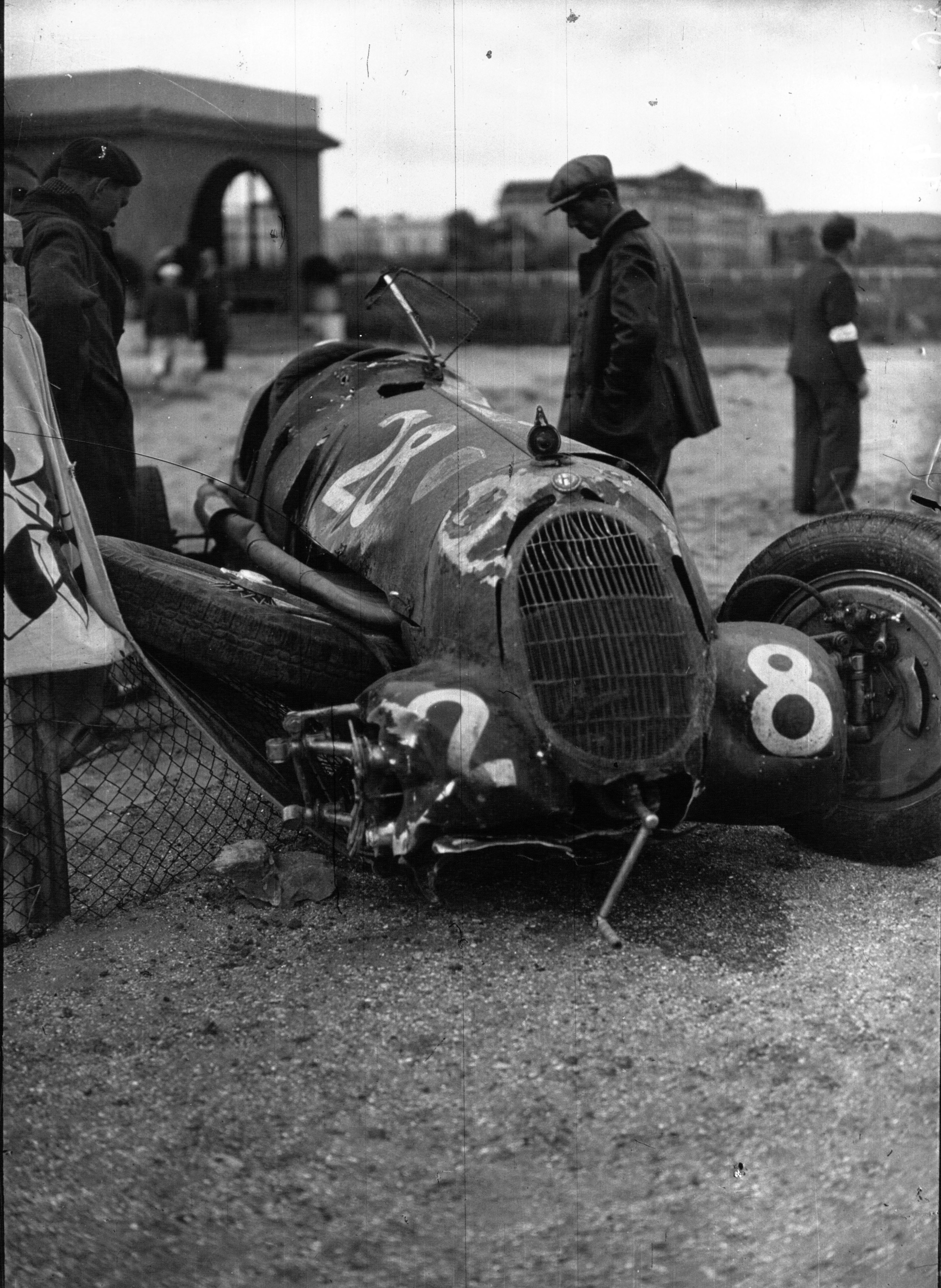
Farina's damaged Alfa Romeo 8C-35 at the 1936 Deauville Grand Prix

During the 1933 and 1934 seasons, Farina returned to the sport, racing Maseratis and Alfa Romeos for Gino Rovere and Scuderia Subalpina, and began a friendship with Italian racing legend Tazio Nuvolari. It was Nuvolari who to some extent, guided Farina's early career. In 1935, he raced for the factory Maserati team, showing enough promise to impress Enzo Ferrari, who recruited him to drive for Scuderia Ferrari, the team that ran the works-supported Alfa Romeos. It was in an Alfa Romeo 8C that he finished second in the Mille Miglia, after driving through the night without lights. Farina also raced in the U.S., driving for Alfa Romeo in the American Automobile Association-sanctioned Vanderbilt Cups of 1936 and 1937. He became a Grand Prix winner when he won the 1937 Grand Prix of Naples.

Although he was noted for his driving style and intelligence, Farina had a petulant streak and disregard for his fellow competitors whilst on the race track. He was involved in two fatal accidents. The first was during the 1936 Grand Prix de Deauville, when he tried to pass Marcel Lehoux for second. Farina's Alfa Romeo 8C collided with Lehoux's ERA, causing the ERA to overturn and catch fire. Lehoux was thrown out, suffered a fractured skull and died in the hospital, while Farina escaped with minor injuries. Two seasons later, during the 1938 Gran Premio di Tripoli, László Hartmann's Maserati 4CM cut a corner in front of Farina. The cars collided and overturned. Farina survived without major injuries, but Hartmann died the following day.

In 1938, the official Alfa Romeo team, Alfa Corse, returned to motorsport, and Farina was a member. Driving the new Alfa Romeo 158 Voiturette in 1939, he won the Grand Prix d'Anvers, Coppa Ciano and the Prix de Berne, to become the Italian Champion for the third year in succession. The following year, he won the Tripoli Grand Prix and finished second in the Mille Miglia for the third time.

== Post-World War II career ==
After World War II, Farina returned to Alfa Corse to drive their 158. He won the 1946 Grand Prix des Nations. However, he left Alfa Corse after a disagreement over team leadership and sat out the whole of the 1947 season. He came back to the sport in 1948 with a privately entered Maserati and a works Ferrari. During this period, he also married Elsa Giaretto. In her opinion, motorsport was a silly and dangerous activity, and she tried to persuade Farina to stop. Three days after their high society wedding, Farina flew to Argentina, where he drove his Maserati 8CL to victory in the Gran Premio Internacional del General San Martín. On his return to Europe, he won the Grand Prix des Nations and the 1948 Monaco Grand Prix. Using Ferrari's first Grand Prix car, the Ferrari 125, he won the Circuito di Garda before giving the Temporada another visit. This resulted in victory in the Copa Acción San Lorenzo in February 1949. The rest of the year he raced Maseratis for Scuderia Milano and Scuderia Ambrosiana, and at times in his own 4CLT/48. He won the Lausanne Grand Prix and then was re-signed by Alfa Corse.

=== 1950 World Drivers' Champion ===
In 1950, Farina returned to Alfa Romeo for the inaugural FIA World Championship of Drivers. The opening race of the season was held at Silverstone Circuit, in front of 150,000 spectators. Farina won, with teammates Luigi Fagioli and Reg Parnell, completing an Alfa Romeo 1–2–3 finish. The victory made Farina the first of only three drivers to win on their World Drivers' Championship début. The other two are Johnnie Parsons, who won the AAA-sanctioned 1950 Indianapolis 500, 17 days later – and Giancarlo Baghetti, who won the 1961 French Grand Prix.

At Monaco eight days later, a multiple pile-up on the first lap saw Farina spin out of a race that Juan Manuel Fangio went on to win. In the 1950 Swiss Grand Prix, Farina beat his teammate Fagioli into second. The next race, at Circuit de Spa-Francorchamps, saw Fangio beat Fagioli, with Farina finishing in fourth with transmission problems. At this stage, Farina still led the championship on points: Farina 22; Fagioli 18; Fangio 17.

When Fangio won the 1950 French Grand Prix, Farina finished outside of the points in seventh. By the season finale on 3 September, the 1950 Italian Grand Prix, Farina was trailing his teammate by two points. For Alfa, Monza was home territory, and so they fielded an additional car for Piero Taruffi and Consalvo Sanesi. It was the Ferrari of Alberto Ascari who put pressure on the Alfas during the early stages of the race, lying in second, in the knowledge that his car only needed one fuel stop to the Alfas' two, but he retired with engine problems. Soon after, Fangio's gearbox failed, and Taruffi handed over his car, only for it to drop a valve and retire. Instead, first position and therefore the championship went to Farina.

Farina continued with Alfa Romeo for the 1951 season but was beaten by Fangio, who secured the title for the Milanese marque. Farina finished the season in fourth place, with his only world championship victory coming in the 1951 Belgian Grand Prix at Spa-Francorchamps. Farina switched back to Ferrari in 1952, when Grand Prix racing switched to Formula 2 specification, but had to take second place to team leader Ascari. He won the non-championship Gran Premio di Napoli and Monza Grand Prix. Ascari's total domination of the championship had been a bitter blow to Farina's self-image. He also drove Tony Vandervell's Thinwall Special – a modified Ferrari 375 F1 car to second place in the end-of-season Woodcote Cup at Goodwood.

Farina remained at Ferrari for the 1953 season. He was involved in a large accident at the first race of the season, the Argentine Grand Prix: President Juan Perón had allowed free access to the race, which meant that the drivers had to race with hordes of spectators lining the circuit, and a young boy ran across the track while Farina was committed to a fast corner, the Curva Nor Este. Farina was forced to take evasive action and swerved into the spectators standing on the exit of the corner, killing seven and injuring many others.

Farina's best result of the season was the victory in the 1953 German Grand Prix. He took up the challenge against the works Maserati of Fangio and Mike Hawthorn when Ascari's car lost a wheel. Other non-Championship Formula One victories came in the Gran Premio di Napoli and Grand Prix de Rouen-les-Essarts. By now he had accepted that Ascari and Fangio were faster drivers than him. He nevertheless took a string of podium finishes, gaining third place in the World Championship. This year saw the introduction of the World Sportscar Championship, and as part of the Scuderia Ferrari squad of drivers, Farina made a number of appearances, winning twice. The first came in the 24 Heures de Spa-Francorchamps, when he and Hawthorn had a winning margin of 18 laps, which amounted to about an advantage of close to 90 minutes. The second victory came in the next race, the 1953 1000km of Nürburgring, this time partnered by Ascari, with a smaller margin of just over 15 minutes. He also triumphed in the Daily Express Trophy race at Silverstone in another one-off race in the Thinwall Special.

Although he was now 47, a golden opportunity arose at Ferrari when Ascari left the team, leaving Farina the team leader. After early season results including victories in the 1000 km Buenos Aires sports car race, co-driven by the young Italian Umberto Maglioli, and the Syracuse Grand Prix, he crashed heavily in the Mille Miglia whilst leading in his Ferrari 375 Plus. Just seven weeks later, and with his right arm still in plaster, Farina raced in the 1954 Belgian Grand Prix. He was leading before the end of the first lap, dicing with Fangio's Maserati, until the ignition failed on his Ferrari. Later in the season he was badly injured in the Supercortemaggiore Grand Prix, a sports car race at Monza, as a consequence of which he spent 20 days in hospital.

Farina was back with Ferrari for the start of the 1955 season in Argentina, taking morphine injections to ease the pain. But the heat took its toll on all of the drivers. Farina pitted due to exhaustion, with his Ferrari 625 being taken over by the team's spare driver, Maglioli. When José Froilán González pitted, a revived Farina was sent out in his place. Later in the race, González – who was back in his car – crashed but rejoined and handed the car back to Farina, who brought it home in second. Third place in the 1955 Argentine Grand Prix went to Farina's original car, which had been driven by Maglioli and Maurice Trintignant. After a third place in Belgium, Farina retired mid-season, owing to the continued pain and the death of Ascari. He returned for the 1955 Italian Grand Prix, but his Scuderia Ferrari-entered Lancia D50 suffered a tyre failure at 170 mph during a practice session, whilst on the Monza's new banking. The car spun, but Farina stepped out unhurt. Ferrari withdrew the car from the event, and Farina did not start his final Grand Prix.

=== World Drivers' Championship Indianapolis 500 career ===
The AAA/USAC-sanctioned Indianapolis 500 was included in the FIA World Drivers' Championship from 1950 through 1960. Drivers competing at Indianapolis during those years were credited with World Drivers' Championship participation, and were eligible to score WDC points alongside those which they may have scored towards the AAA/USAC National Championship.

Farina attempted to qualify for one World Drivers' Championship race at Indianapolis, failing to make the 1956 race.

Following abortive entries in 1950 and 1952 where he was set to drive modified grand prix-style cars, Farina entered the 1956 Indianapolis 500 with the "Bardahl-Ferrari" - a Kurtis Kraft chassis with a six-cylinder Ferrari engine installed. This car carried sponsorship from the Seattle-based Bardahl performance lubricants corporation.

Qualifying for the race took place during four days in May. Farina failed to get up to speed during the first two qualifying sessions. The second weekend of the month saw heavy rain, cancelling the third day of qualifications, and leaving a limited amount of time for drivers to contest the remaining spaces on the grid. On the fourth day of qualifying, Farina was among a number of drivers who were unable to make a final attempt.

Farina elected to race a conventional Offenhauser-powered car in 1957, but he had difficulty getting the car up to speed, experiencing handling issues. His teammate, Keith Andrews, stepped into the car for a test run. Andrews crashed on the front stretch, backing the car into the inside wall and getting crushed to death between the cowl and fuel tank. Following Andrews' death, Farina withdrew from the event.

== Death ==
Following his retirement, Farina became involved in Alfa Romeo and Jaguar distributorships and later assisted at the Pininfarina factory.

On his way to the 1966 French Grand Prix, Farina lost control of his Lotus Cortina in the Savoy Alps, near Aiguebelle, hit a telegraph pole and was killed instantly. He had been on his way to both watch the race and to take part in filming as the adviser and driving double of the French actor Yves Montand, who played an ex-World Champion in the film Grand Prix.

== Motorsports career results ==
=== Notable career results ===
Season	Series	Position	Team	Car
1933	Coppa Principessa di Piemonte	3rd		Alfa Romeo 2300
1934	Masarykuv Okruh	**1st**	Scuderia Subalpina	Maserati 4CM
1934	Giro d'Italia	2nd		Lancia Astura V8
1934	Gran Premio de Biella	3rd	Scuderia Subalpina	Maserati 4CM
1935	Bergamo GP	2nd	Scuderia Subalpina	Maserati 4CM
1935	Gran Premio de Biella	3rd	Scuderia Subalpina	Maserati 4CM
1935	AIACR European Championship	21st	Gino Rovere	Maserati 6C-34
1936	Mille Miglia	2nd	Scuderia Ferrari	Alfa Romeo 8C 2900 A
1936	Penya Rhin Grand Prix	3rd	Scuderia Ferrari	Alfa Romeo 8C-35
1936	Circuito di Milano	3rd	Scuderia Ferrari	Alfa Romeo 8C-35
1936	Gran Premio di Modena	3rd	Scuderia Ferrari	Alfa Romeo 8C-35
1936	AIACR European Championship	14th	Scuderia Ferrari	Alfa Romeo 8C-35
1937	Italian Championship	**1st**	Scuderia Ferrari	Alfa Romeo 12C-36
1937	Gran Premio di Napoli	**1st**	Scuderia Ferrari	Alfa Romeo 12C-36
1937	Mille Miglia	2nd	Scuderia Ferrari	Alfa Romeo 8C 2900 A
1937	Turin Grand Prix	2nd	Scuderia Ferrari	Alfa Romeo 12C-36
1937	Circuito di Milano	2nd	Scuderia Ferrari	Alfa Romeo 12C-36
1937	AIACR European Championship	7th	Scuderia Ferrari	Alfa Romeo 8C-35
1937	AAA National Championship	7th	Scuderia Ferrari	Alfa Romeo 8C-35
1938	Italian Championship	**1st**	Alfa Corse	Alfa Romeo Tipo 316
1938	Pontedecimo-Giovi	**1st**	Alfa Corse	Alfa Romeo 2900B MM
1938	Coppa Ciano	2nd	Alfa Corse	Alfa Romeo Tipo 316
1938	Coppa Acerbo	2nd	Alfa Corse	Alfa Romeo Tipo 316
1938	Gran Premio d'Italia	2nd	Alfa Corse	Alfa Romeo Tipo 316
1938	AIACR European Championship	8th	Alfa Corse	Alfa Romeo Tipo 312; Alfa Romeo Tipo 316
1939	Italian Championship	**1st**	Alfa Corse	Alfa Romeo 158
1939	GP d'Anvers	**1st**	Alfa Corse	Alfa Romeo 8C 2900B/412S
1939	Coppa Ciano	**1st**	Alfa Corse	Alfa Romeo 158
1939	Prix de Berne	**1st**	Alfa Corse	Alfa Romeo 158
1939	Coppa Acerbo	3rd	Alfa Corse	Alfa Romeo 158
1939	AIACR European Championship	13th	Alfa Corse	Alfa Romeo 158
1940	Gran Premio di Tripoli	**1st**	Alfa Corse	Alfa Romeo 158
1940	Mille Miglia	2nd		Alfa Romeo 6C 2500 SS Spider Touring
1946	Grand Prix des Nations	**1st**		Alfa Romeo 158
1948	Gran Premio Internacional del General San Martín	**1st**	Scuderia Milano	Maserati 8CL
1948	Grand Prix des Nations	**1st**		Maserati 4CLT
1948	Grand Prix Automobile de Monaco	**1st**		Maserati 4CLT
1948	Circuito di Garda	**1st**		Ferrari 125
1949	Copa Acción de San Lorenzo	**1st**	Scuderia Ferrari	Ferrari 125C
1949	Lausanne Grand Prix	**1st**		Maserati 4CLT/48
1949	Grande Prêmio da Cidade de Rio de Janeiro	2nd	Scuderia Ferrari	Ferrari 125C
1949	Daily Express BRDC International Trophy	2nd	Scuderia Ferrari	Ferrari 125
1950	**FIA Formula World Championship**	**1st**	**Alfa Romeo SpA**	**Alfa Romeo 158**; **Alfa Romeo 159**
1950	RAC British Grand Prix	**1st**	Alfa Romeo SpA	Alfa Romeo 158
1950	Großer Preis der Schweiz	**1st**	Alfa Romeo SpA	Alfa Romeo 158
1950	Gran Premio di Bari	**1st**	Alfa Romeo SpA	Alfa Romeo 158
1950	Daily Express BRDC International Trophy	**1st**	Alfa Romeo SpA	Alfa Romeo 158
1950	Gran Premo d'Italia	**1st**	Alfa Romeo SpA	Alfa Romeo 159
1950	Gran Premio Internacional del General San Martín	2nd	Dott G. Farina	Maserati 4CLT
1950	Copa Acción de San Lorenzo	3rd	Dott G. Farina	Maserati 4CLT
1951	Grand Prix de Paris	**1st**	Scuderia Milano	Maserati 4CLT
1951	Ulster Trophy	**1st**	Alfa Romeo SpA	Alfa Romeo 159A
1951	Grote Prijs van Belgie	**1st**	Alfa Romeo SpA	Alfa Romeo 159A
1951	Woodcote Cup	**1st**	Alfa Romeo SpA	Alfa Romeo 159
1951	Festival of Britain Trophy	2nd	Scuderia Milano	Maserati 4CLT
1951	Grand Prix de Pau	3rd	Scuderia Milano	Maserati 4CLT
1951	Großer Preis der Schweiz	3rd	Alfa Romeo SpA	Alfa Romeo 159A
1951	Gran Premio d'Italia	3rd	Alfa Romeo SpA	Alfa Romeo 159M
1951	Gran Premio de España	3rd	Alfa Romeo SpA	Alfa Romeo 159M
1951	FIA Formula One World Championship	4th	Alfa Romeo SpA	Alfa Romeo 159A; Alfa Romeo 159M
1952	Gran Premio di Napoli	**1st**	Scuderia Ferrari	Ferrari 500
1952	Gran Premio dell'Autodromo di Monza	**1st**	Scuderia Ferrari	Ferrari 500
1952	FIA Formula One World Championship	2nd	Scuderia Ferrari	Ferrari 500
1952	Grands Prix de France	2nd	Scuderia Ferrari	Ferrari 500
1952	Grand Prix de Paris	2nd	Scuderia Ferrari	Ferrari 500
1952	Grote Prijs van Belgie	2nd	Scuderia Ferrari	Ferrari 500
1952	Grand Prix de la Marine	2nd	Scuderia Ferrari	Ferrari 500
1952	Grand Prix de l'ACF	2nd	Scuderia Ferrari	Ferrari 500
1952	Großer Preis von Deutschland	2nd	Scuderia Ferrari	Ferrari 500
1952	Grand Prix de la Comminges	2nd	Scuderia Ferrari	Ferrari 500
1952	Grote Prijs van Nederland	2nd	Scuderia Ferrari	Ferrari 500
1952	Woodcote Cup	2nd	G.A. Vandervell	Ferrari 375 Thinwall
1952	Gran Premio di Siracusa	3rd	Scuderia Ferrari	Ferrari 500
1953	Gran Premio Ciudad de Buenos Aires	**1st**	Scuderia Ferrari	Ferrari 500
1953	Gran Premio di Napoli	**1st**	Scuderia Ferrari	Ferrari 500
1953	Grand Prix de Rouen-les-Essarts	**1st**	Scuderia Ferrari	Ferrari 625
1953	Daily Express Trophy	**1st**	G.A. Vandervell	Ferrari Thinwall
1953	24 Heures de Spa Francorchamps	**1st**	Scuderia Ferrari	Ferrari 375 MM Pinin Farina Berlinetta
1953	Großer Preis von Deutschland	**1st**	Scuderia Ferrari	Ferrari 500
1953	Internationales ADAC-1000 km Rennen Weltmeisterchaftslauf Nürburgring	**1st**	Automobili Ferrari	Ferrari 375 MM Vignale Spyder
1953	12 Hours of Casablanca	**1st**	Scuderia Ferrari	Ferrari 375 MM Berlinetta
1953	Grote Prijs van Nederland	2nd	Scuderia Ferrari	Ferrari 500
1953	Großer Preis der Schweiz	2nd	Scuderia Ferrari	Ferrari 500
1953	Gran Premio d'Italia	2nd	Scuderia Ferrari	Ferrari 500
1953	FIA Formula One World Championship	3rd	Scuderia Ferrari	Ferrari 500
1953	RAC British Grand Prix	3rd	Scuderia Ferrari	Ferrari 500
1953	Gran Premio di Monza	3rd	Scuderia Ferrari	Ferrari 250 MM Vignale Spyder
1954	1000 km Buenos Aires	**1st**	Scuderia Ferrari	Ferrari 375 MM
1954	Gran Premio di Siracusa	**1st**	Scuderia Ferrari	Ferrari 625
1954	Grand Prix d'Agadir	**1st**	Scuderia Ferrari	Ferrari 375 Plus
1954	Gran Premio de la Republic Argentina	2nd	Scuderia Ferrari	Ferrari 625
1954	Gran Premio Ciudad de Buenos Aires	3rd	Scuderia Ferrari	Ferrari 625
1954	FIA Formula One World Championship	8th	Scuderia Ferrari	Ferrari 625
1955	Gran Premio de la Republic Argentina	2nd	Scuderia Ferrari	Ferrari 625
1955	Grote Prijs van Belgie	3rd	Scuderia Ferrari	Ferrari 625
1955	FIA Formula One World Championship	5th	Scuderia Ferrari	Ferrari 625

=== European Championship results ===
(key) (Races in bold indicate pole position, races in italics indicate fastest lap)

Year	Entrant	Chassis	Engine	1	2	3	4	5	6	7	EDC	Pts
1935	Gino Rovere	Maserati 6C-34	Maserati 3.7 L6	MON; Ret	FRA	BEL	GER	SUI; 8			21st	51
1935	Scuderia Subalpina	Maserati V8RI	Maserati 4.8 V8						**ITA**; DNS	ESP	21st	51
1936	Scuderia Ferrari	Alfa Romeo 8C-35	Alfa Romeo 3.8 L8	MON; Ret	GER	SUI; Ret					14th	26
1936	Scuderia Ferrari	Alfa Romeo 12C 1936	Alfa Romeo 4.1 V12				ITA; Ret				14th	26
1937	Scuderia Ferrari	Alfa Romeo 12C-36	Alfa Romeo 4.1 V12	BEL	GER; Ret	MON; 6	SUI; Ret	ITA; Ret			7th	28
1938	Alfa Corse	Alfa Romeo Tipo 312	Alfa Romeo 3.0 V12	FRA	GER; Ret	SUI; 5					8th	21
1938	Alfa Corse	Alfa Romeo Tipo 316	Alfa Romeo 3.0 V16				ITA; 2				8th	21
1939	G. Farina	Alfa Romeo Tipo 316	Alfa Romeo 3.0 V16	BEL; Ret	FRA	GER					13th	25
1939	Alfa Corse	Alfa Romeo 158	Alfa Romeo 1.5 L8				SUI; 7				13th	25

=== Post-WWII Grandes Épreuves results ===
(key) (Races in bold indicate pole position) (Races in italics indicate fastest lap)

Year	Entrant	Chassis	Engine	1	2	3	4	5
1948	Giuseppe Farina	Maserati 4CL	Maserati 4CL 1.5 L4 s	**MON**; 1	SUI; Ret	FRA		
1948	Scuderia Ferrari	Ferrari 125	Ferrari 125 F1 1.5 V12 s				ITA; Ret	
1949	Giuseppe Farina	Maserati 4CLT/48	Maserati 4CLT 1.5 L4 s	GBR	BEL; Ret	**SUI**; Ret		
1949	Automobiles Talbot-Darracq	Talbot-Lago T26C	Talbot 23CV 4.5 L6				FRA; Ret	
1949	Scuderia Milano	Maserati 4CLT/48	Maserati 4CLT 1.5 L4 s					ITA; Ret

=== FIA World Drivers' Championship results ===
(key) (Races in bold indicate pole position, races in italics indicate fastest lap)

Year	Entrant	Chassis	Engine	1	2	3	4	5	6	7	8	9	WDC	Pts
1950	Alfa Romeo SpA	Alfa Romeo 158	Alfa Romeo 158 1.5 L8 s	**GBR**; 1	MON; Ret	500	SUI; 1	**BEL**; 4	FRA; 7				**1st**	**30**
1950	Alfa Romeo SpA	Alfa Romeo 159	Alfa Romeo 158 1.5 L8 s							ITA; 1			**1st**	**30**
1951	Alfa Romeo SpA	Alfa Romeo 159	Alfa Romeo 158 1.5 L8 s	SUI; 3	500	BEL; 1	FRA; 5	GBR; Ret	GER; Ret	ITA; 3*	ESP; 3		4th	19 (22)
1952	Scuderia Ferrari	Ferrari 500	Ferrari 500 2.0 L4	**SUI**; Ret	500	BEL; 2	FRA; 2	**GBR**; 6	GER; 2	NED; 2	ITA; 4		**2nd**	**24 (27)**
1953	Scuderia Ferrari	Ferrari 500	Ferrari 500 2.0 L4	ARG; Ret	500	NED; 2	BEL; Ret	FRA; 5	GBR; 3	GER; 1	SUI; 2	ITA; 2	**3rd**	**26 (32)**
1954	Scuderia Ferrari	Ferrari 625	Ferrari 625 2.5 L4	**ARG**; 2	500								8th	6
1954	Scuderia Ferrari	Ferrari 553	Ferrari 554 2.5 L4			BEL; Ret	FRA	GBR	GER	SUI	ITA	ESP; DNA	8th	6
1955	Scuderia Ferrari	Ferrari 625	Ferrari 555 2.5 L4	ARG; 2+3†									5th	10 1/3
1955	Scuderia Ferrari	Ferrari 625	Ferrari 555 2.5 L4		MON; 4	500							5th	10 1/3
1955	Scuderia Ferrari	Ferrari 555	Ferrari 555 2.5 L4				BEL; 3	NED	GBR				5th	10 1/3
1955	Scuderia Ferrari	Lancia D50	Lancia DS50 2.5 V8							ITA; DNS			5th	10 1/3
1956	Bardahl-Ferrari	Kurtis Kraft 500D	Ferrari 446 4.5 L6	ARG	MON	500; DNQ	BEL	FRA	GBR	GER	ITA		NC	0

* Indicates shared drive with Felice Bonetto
† Indicates shared drives with José Froilán González and Maurice Trintignant (2nd place) & Maurice Trintignant and Umberto Maglioli (3rd place)

=== Non-championship Formula One results ===
(key) (Races in bold indicate pole position, races in italics indicate fastest lap)

Year	Entrant	Chassis	Engine	1	2	3	4	5	6	7	8	9	10	11	12	13	14	15	16	17	18	19	20	21	22	23	24	25	26	27	28	29	30	31	32	33	34	35
1950	Alfa Romeo SpA	Alfa Romeo 158	Alfa Romeo 158 1.5 L8 s	PAU	RIC	SRM	PAR	EMP	**BAR**; 1	JER			NAT; 6	NOT	ULS	PES	STT	INT; 1	GOO	PEN																		
1950	Dr. G. Farina	Maserati 4CLT/48	Maserati 4CLT 1.5 L4 s								ALB; 7	NED																										
1951	Dr. G. Farina	Maserati 4CLT/48	Maserati 4CLT 1.5 L4 s	SYR; Ret	PAU; 3	RIC	SRM	BOR; Ret		PAR; 1			**NED**; Ret	ALB	PES																							
1951	Alfa Romeo SpA	Alfa Romeo 159	Alfa Romeo 158 1.5 L8 s						INT; 9		**ULS**; 1	SCO				BAR; Ret	**GOO**; 1																					
1952	Scuderia Ferrari	Ferrari 500	Ferrari 500 2.0 L4	RIO	SYR; 3						MAR; Ret	AST	INT	ELÄ	**NAP**; 1	EIF	PAR; 2*	ALB	FRO	ULS	MNZ; 1	LAC	ESS	MAR; 2	SAB; Ret	CAE	DMT	COM; 2	NAT	BAU; Ret	MOD; 4	CAD	SKA	MAD	AVU	JOE	NEW	RIO
1952	Scuderia Ferrari	Ferrari 375	Ferrari 375 4.5 V12			**VAL**; Ret	RIC	LAV	PAU	IBS																												
1953	Scuderia Ferrari	Ferrari 500	Ferrari 500 2.0 L4	BUE; 1	SYR; Ret	PAU; Ret	LAV	AST	BOR; Ret	INT	ELÄ	**NAP**; 1	ULS	WIN	FRO	COR	EIF					ROU; 1	CRY	AVU	USF	LAC	BRI	CHE	SAB	NEW	CAD	RED	SKA	LON	MOD	MAD	JOE	CUR
1953	GA Vandervell	Ferrari 375 tw	Ferrari 375 4.5 V12															ALB; DNQ	PRI	ESS	MID																	
1954	Scuderia Ferrari	Ferrari 625	Ferrari 625 2.5 L4	SYR; 1	**PAU**; 5	LAV	BOR	INT	BAR	CUR	ROM	FRO	COR	BRC	CRY	ROU	CAE	AUG	COR	OUL	RED	PES	JOE	CAD	BER	GOO	DTT											
1955	Scuderia Ferrari	Ferrari 625	Ferrari 555 2.5 L4	VAL; Ret	PAU	GLO	BOR; Ret	INT	NAP	ALB	CUR	COR	LON	DRT	RED	DTT	OUT	AVO	SYR																			

* Indicates Shared Drive with André Simon

=== Indianapolis 500 results ===
Year	Chassis	Engine	Start	Finish	Team
1956	Kurtis Kraft	Ferrari	DNQ		Bardahl
1957	Kurtis Kraft	Offenhauser	Wth		Farina

=== 24 Hours of Le Mans results ===
Year	Team	Co-Drivers	Car	Class	Laps	Pos.	Class Pos.
1953	(Italy) Scuderia Ferrari	(United Kingdom) Mike Hawthorn	Ferrari 340 MM Pininfarina Berlinetta	S5.0	12	DSQ	DSQ

=== 24 Hours of Spa results ===
Year	Team	Co-Drivers	Car	Class	Laps	Pos.	Class Pos.
1936	(Italy) Scuderia Ferrari	(Italy) Eugenio Siena	Alfa Romeo 8C 2900A	Compr.		DNF	DNF
1953	(Italy) Scuderia Ferrari	(United Kingdom) Mike Hawthorn	Ferrari 375 MM Pininfarina Berlinetta	S	260	**1st**	**1st**

=== Mille Miglia results ===
Year	Team	Co-Drivers	Car	Class	Pos.	Class Pos.
1934	(Italy) Scuderia Subalpina	(Italy) Luigi Della Chiesa	Alfa Romeo 6C 1750	T2.0	DNF	DNF
1936	(Italy) Scuderia Ferrari	(Italy) Stefano Meazza	Alfa Romeo 8C 2900A	+2.0c	**2nd**	**2nd**
1937	(Italy) Scuderia Ferrari	(Italy) Stefano Meazza	Alfa Romeo 8C 2900A	S+2.0	**2nd**	**2nd**
1938	(Italy) Alfa Corse	(Italy) Stefano Meazza	Alfa Romeo 8C 2900B	S3s/4.5	DNF	DNF
1940		(Italy) Paride Mambelli	Alfa Romeo 6C 2500 SS	3.0	**2nd**	**1st**
1953	(Italy) Ferrari Spa	(Italy) Luigi Parenti	Ferrari 340 MM Touring Spyder	S+2.0	DNF	DNF
1954	(Italy) Scuderia Ferrari	(Italy) Luigi Parenti	Ferrari 375 Plus	S+2.0	DNF	DNF

=== Carrera Panamericana results ===
Year	Team	Co-Drivers	Car	Class	Pos.	Class Pos.
1952	(United States) Scuderia Guastella	(United States) Bill Spear	Ferrari 340 Mexico Vignale Spyder	S	DNS	DNS

=== 12 Hours of Casablanca results ===
Year	Team	Co-Drivers	Car	Class	Pos.	Class Pos.
1953	(Italy) Scuderia Ferrari	(Italy) Piero Scotti	Ferrari 375 MM	S+2.0	**1st**	**1st**

== See also ==
- Formula One drivers from Italy

Sporting positions
Preceded by None	Formula One World Champion; 1950	Succeeded by Juan Manuel Fangio
Preceded by Hermann Lang	Gran Premio di Tripoli winner 1940	Succeeded by None
Preceded by Manfred von Brauchitsch; 1937	Grand Prix de Monaco winner 1948	Succeeded by Juan Manuel Fangio; 1950
Preceded by Alberto Ascari	Grand Premio di Bari winner 1950	Succeeded by Juan Manuel Fangio
Preceded by Alberto Ascari	BRDC International Trophy winner 1950	Succeeded by Reg Parnell
Preceded by Georges Grignard	Grand Prix de Paris winner 1951	Succeeded by Piero Taruffi
Preceded by Alberto Ascari	Gran Premio di Napoli winner 1952 & 1953	Succeeded by Luigi Musso
Preceded by None	Gran Premio Ciudad de Buenos Aires winner 1953	Succeeded by Maurice Trintignant
Preceded by Luigi Chinetti; Jean Lucas; 1949	Spa 24 Hours winner 1953; With: Mike Hawthorn	Succeeded by Robert Crevits; Gustave Gosselin; 1964
Records
Preceded by None	Youngest Grand Prix polesitter 43 years, 195 days (1950 British Grand Prix)	Succeeded by Juan Manuel Fangio; 38 years, 331 days (1950 Monaco GP)
Preceded by None	Youngest Grand Prix race winner 43 years, 195 days (1950 British Grand Prix)	Succeeded by Juan Manuel Fangio; 38 years, 331 days (1950 Monaco GP)
Preceded by None	Youngest driver to set fastest lap in Formula One; 43 years, 195 days (1950 British Grand Prix)	Succeeded by Juan Manuel Fangio; 38 years, 331 days (1950 Monaco GP)
Preceded by None	Most Grand Prix wins 2 wins 1st at the 1950 British GP	Succeeded by Juan Manuel Fangio; 6 wins, 3rd at the 1950 French GP
Preceded by None	Youngest Formula One; World Drivers' Champion; 43 years, 308 days (1950 season)	Succeeded by Juan Manuel Fangio; 40 years, 126 days (1951 season)
