= Temperino =

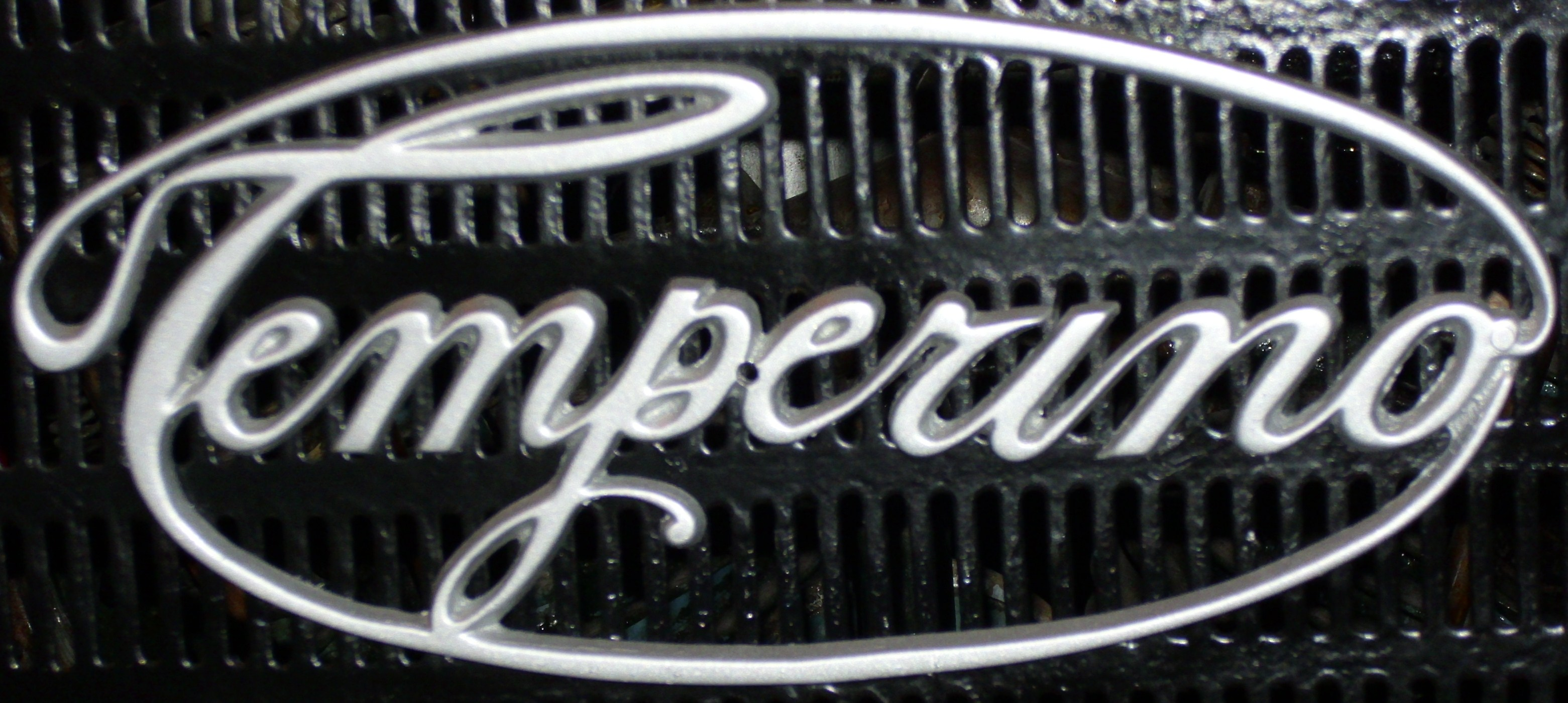
- Industry: Automotive
- Founded: 1906
- Defunct: 1924
- Fate: Ceased production
- Headquarters: Turin, Italy
- Key people: Maurizio, Giacomo and Mary Temperino
- Products: Automobiles

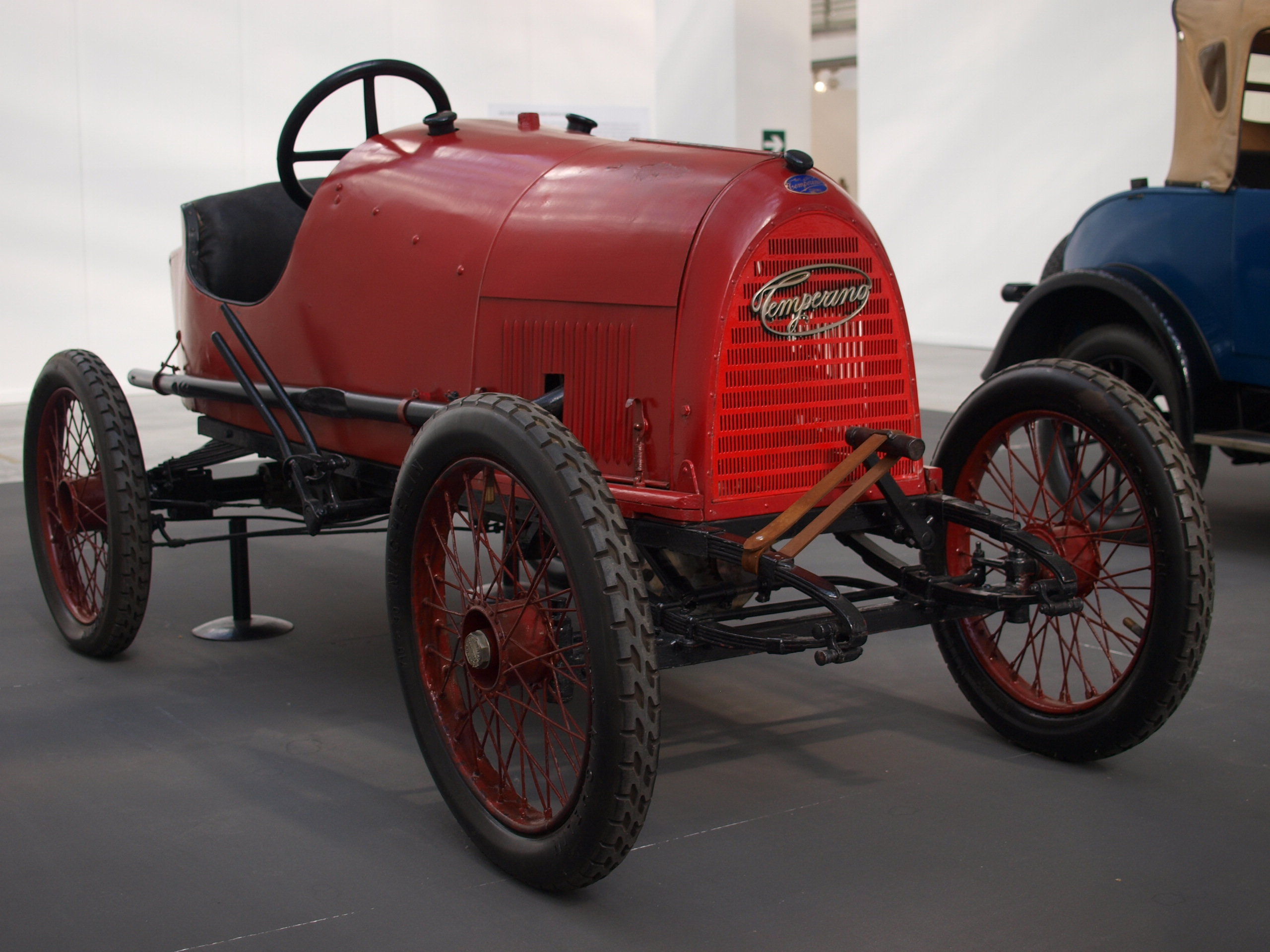
Temperino 8/10 HP (1920)

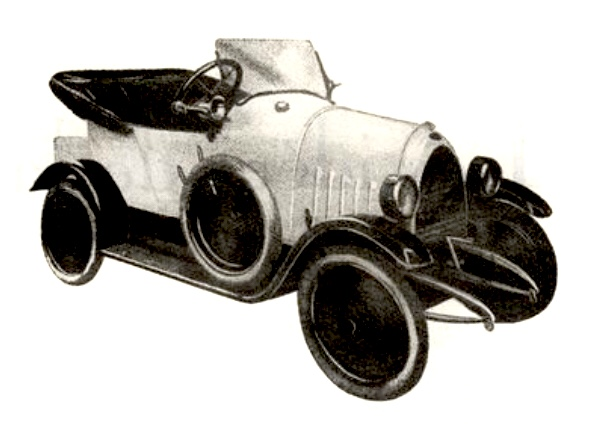
Temperino (1920)

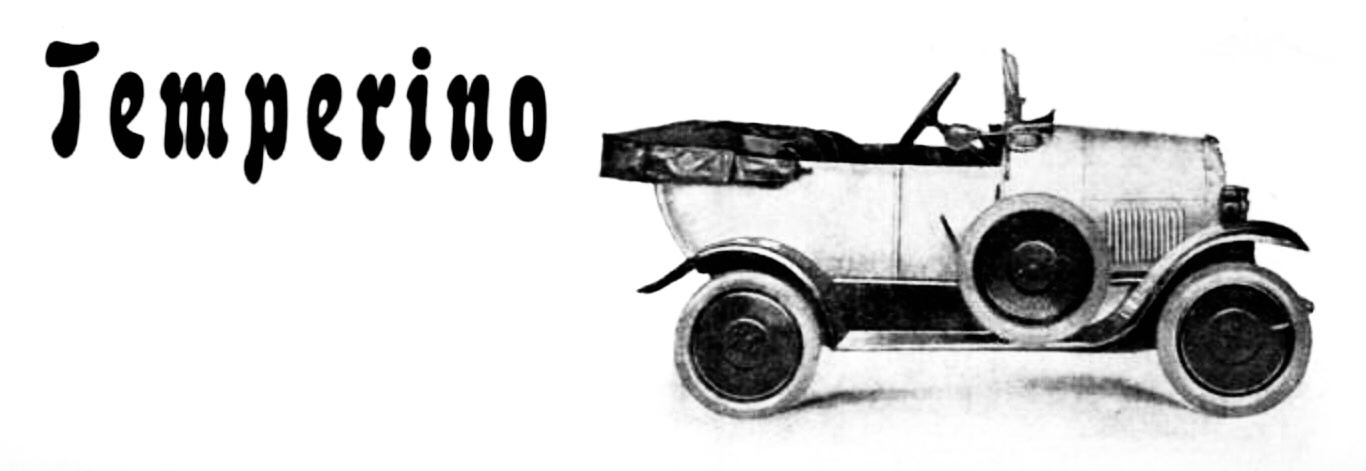
Temperino (1923)

Temperino was an Italian car maker founded in 1906 in Turin, by three Temperino siblings (Maurizio, Giacomo and Mary). At first Temperino repaired bicycles and motorcycles, starting production of motorcycles in 1908. The first car in 1908 was a prototype with a 350 cc two cylinder engine. After protyping this car went into production as the 8/10 HP, now with an 800 cc air-cooled V2 engine. This model was built until after the First World War; around 1500 units were built. Other models produced by Temperino were made in collaboration with other firms such as body maker Stabilimenti Farina.

The company name was changed to Societa Anonima Vetturette Temperino in 1919, and business success made it to possible to start operations in London, United Kingdom as Temperino Motors Ltd.. In 1922 a new model arrived: the GSM 7-14HP.

In 1924 the financial situation became so bad that the Temperinos decided to close the business rather than let it go bankrupt. Two years later the Temperinos opened a garage for car repairs, including a petrol station.

== See also ==
- List of Italian companies
