= Emilio Materassi =

Italian racing driver (1894–1928)

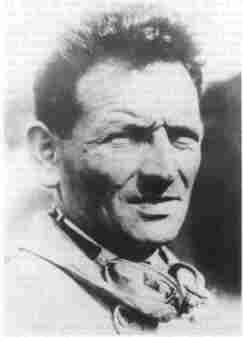

Emilio Materassi (October 30, 1894 – September 9, 1928) was an Italian Grand Prix motor racing driver.

== Early life ==
Born in Borgo San Lorenzo, near Florence, Emilio began working in a bicycle shop, learning the basics of applied mechanics. Later, he went to work in a car garage, where he developed a strong love for engines and cars.

When he was in his twenties, Materassi took over the administration of his family business, selling wine, ropes and twine.

Poor economic condition forced him to work as a bus driver for local services.

== Racing career ==
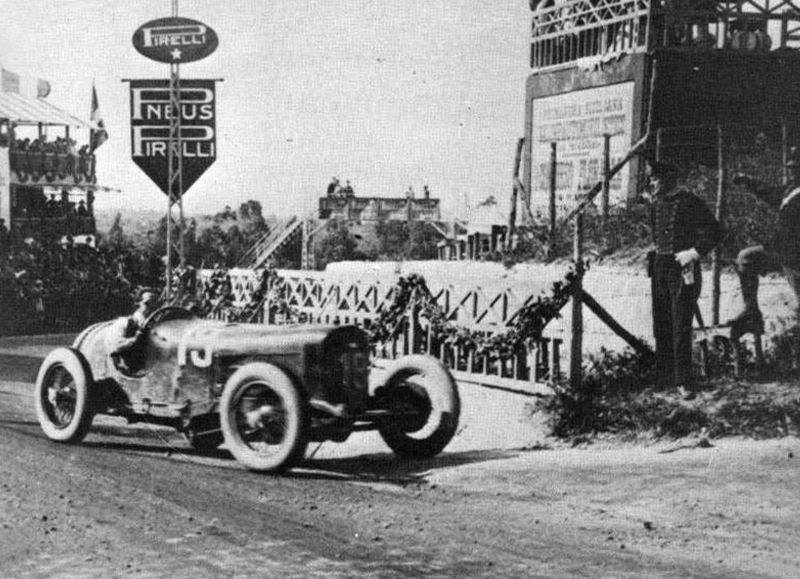
Materassi with Itala Special - Hispano-Suiza in Targa Florio 1926

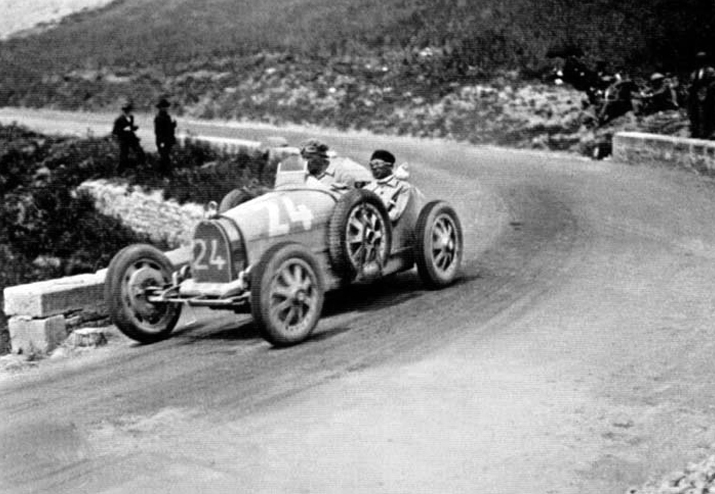
Materassi with Bugatti Type 35 in 1927 Targa Florio

Materassi's racing debut came at the Gentlemen Grand Prix at Brescia, September 11, 1921, driving an aged car from the Turin automaker Itala. The car broke down after three laps. Materassi had better fortune the following June when he finished 8th overall at the Mugello Circuit.

In 1923 Materassi, with the help of some wealthy friends, opened his own workshop in Via dei Poggi 12, in Florence. He called it "L’Autogarage Nazionale", and signed a dealership contract with Itala. During World War I Itala had built Hispano-Suiza aircraft engines under license. After the war the company had a surplus of spare engines, and Materassi succeeded in buying one of those at a very low price. Materassi heavily modified the engine converting it from V8 configuration to inline 4 cylinder by removing one of the cylinder blocks, and built a car based on an Itala chassis around it, calling his construction "Italona". The car was quite heavy, weighing over 2 tons. Nevertheless, the ~5.8 liters aviation engine was powerful enough to allow good performances even in hill climbing races.

With the Italona, Materassi won a lot of important, but local, races from 1924 to 1926, including two Mugello Grand Prix and three hillclimbs at the Pistoian Hills (Coppa della Collina Pistoiese). In 1926 he managed to get a fourth place in the prestigious Targa Florio. He won the Coppa Montenero at the difficult Montenero Circuit in 1925 and 1926, earning the nickname "King of Montenero”.

Materassi had become close friends with Alfieri Maserati and was given the opportunity to race with the Maserati team on a number of occasions, among them the 1925 and 1926 Italian Grand Prix. Sadly, he had to retire from all of those races, most of the time due to mechanical failures.

Impressed by the skills of the young pilot, the team manager of the Bugatti racing team asked Materassi to join them in 1927. In his first race with the brand new Bugatti T35C, he won the Tripoli Grand Prix, with an average speed of 132 km/h, and in April the same year he finally won the Targa Florio. He also won another Coppa Montenero. Those victories, along with others, gained him the title "Absolute Champion of Italy".

In 1928 Materassi founded his own racing team, buying cars and material from the bankrupt Talbot team. Materassi worked on the engines and the chassis himself, modifying the old cars to make them 30 kilograms lighter. Apart from himself, Luigi Arcangeli, Antonio Brivio, Gastone Brilli-Peri and Gianfranco Comotti became drivers for Scuderia Materassi.

In June 1928 he won the Grand Prix of Mugello driving a Talbot and finished second in the Coppa Acerbo in August then that same month he won his fourth Coppa Montenero, beating both Tazio Nuvolari and Giuseppe Campari.

== Death ==
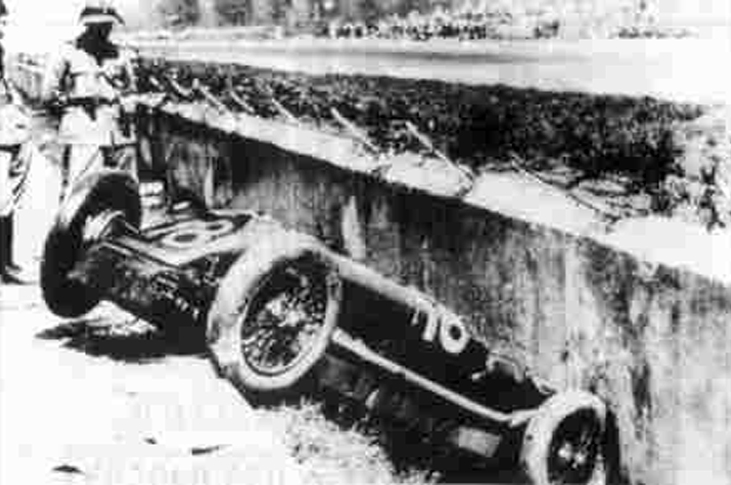
The fatal accident of Materassi during the 1928 Italian Grand Prix held at the Autodromo Nazionale Monza

On the 17th lap of the 1928 Italian Grand Prix held at the Autodromo Nazionale Monza, Materassi lost control of his Talbot 700 when he tried to overtake Giulio Foresti’s Bugatti T35C on the main straight at over 200 km/h. The Talbot swerved to the left, jumped over a three-meter deep and four-meter wide protection ditch and a fence, and crashed into the grandstand.

Materassi was killed instantly along with twenty spectators, and a large number of people were injured. The other drivers of the Scuderia Materassi withdrew from the race immediately after the accident, but the event continued and it was won by Louis Chiron. Three days later one of the injured spectators died in hospital, making the total death toll 22. Other sources state that 27 spectators were killed all in all.

By either estimation this is the worst accident, with respect to the number of lives lost, to occur at a Grand Prix and it is only surpassed by the 1955 Le Mans disaster in the history of motor racing. As a result, the Italian Grand Prix was cancelled in 1929 and 1930.

== Notable race victories ==
- Coppa della Consuma : 1924
- Coppa della Collina Pistoiese : 1924, 1925, 1926
- Coppa Perugina : 1924, 1926, 1927
- Circuito del Savio : 1925
- Grand Prix of Mugello : 1925, 1926, 1928
- Coppa Montenero : 1925, 1926, 1927, 1928
- Tripoli Grand Prix : 1927
- Targa Florio : 1927
- Bologna Grand Prix : 1927
- San Sebastian Grand Prix : 1927
