= Speluzzi =

Coordinates: 35°32′S 63°48′W

- Rural locality and village
- Interactive map of Speluzzi
- Country: Argentina
- Province: La Pampa Province
- Time zone: UTC−3 (ART)

Speluzzi is a village and rural locality (municipality) in La Pampa Province in Argentina.
