= Tripoli Grand Prix =

Motor racing event

Coordinates: 32.887°N 13.308°E

- Mellaha Lake

Race information
- Number of times held: 14
- First held: 1925
- Last held: 1940
- Most wins (drivers): (Italy) Achille Varzi (3) (Germany) Hermann Lang (3)
- Most wins (constructors): Bugatti (4); Mercedes-Benz (4)
- Circuit length: 13.140 km (8.165 miles)
- Race length: 394.2 km (244.945 miles)
- Laps: 30

Last race (1940)

Pole position
- (Italy) Giuseppe Farina; Alfa Corse; 3:37.85

Podium
- 1. (Italy) Giuseppe Farina; Alfa Corse; 2. (Italy) Clemente Biondetti; Alfa Corse; 3. (Italy) Carlo Felice Trossi; Alfa Corse

Fastest lap
- (Italy) Giuseppe Farina; Alfa Corse; 3:40.91

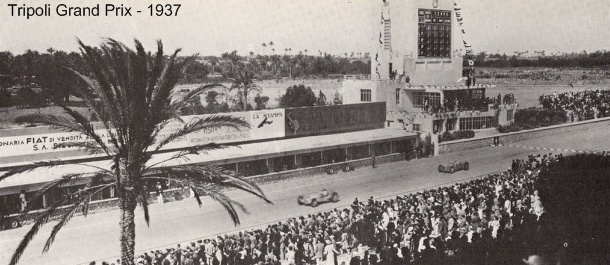
1937 Tripoli Grand Prix.

The Tripoli Grand Prix (Italian: Gran Premio di Tripoli) was a motor racing event first held in 1925 on a racing circuit outside Tripoli, the capital of what was then Italian Tripolitania, now Libya. It lasted until 1940.

== History ==
Motor racing was an extremely popular sport in Italy and the colony was seeking methods to raise capital and promote tourism—tourists who, it was hoped, would then decide to settle in Tripolitania. But despite the support of the colony's extremely enthusiastic governor, General Emilio de Bono, and some initial success, the events failed financially. Only personal intervention by General de Bono kept the 1929 event from being cancelled, and 1930 was marred by a spartan field, little public interest, and the death of Gastone Brilli-Peri in an accident. Initial enthusiasm and sponsorship had retreated, the fallout from Brilli-Peri's accident meant a 1931 running was impossible, and the dream of a successful Tripoli Grand Prix might have ended there and then.

But the president of Tripoli's auto club, Egidio Sforzini, was resilient. He decided to organize another Grand Prix, this time on a purpose built European style racing circuit. Sufficient capital was raised from the Italian government's funding of a fair promoting the colony so as to make the venture possible, and upon the circuit's completion the Grand Prix was scheduled for the spring of 1933.

This new Mellaha Lake track was a 13.140 kilometer (8.165 mi) long affair situated in a salt basin between Tripoli, Suq al Jum'ah (also known as Suk el Giuma or Sugh el Giumaa (سوق الجمعة)) and Tajura and around the Mellaha Air Base. The track's most distinctive landmark was a brilliant white concrete tower situated across from a large frontstretch grandstand that could hold up to ten thousand people. Mellaha Lake was equipped with starting lights, an innovation, and the additional amenities rivaled the best that continental European circuits had to offer.

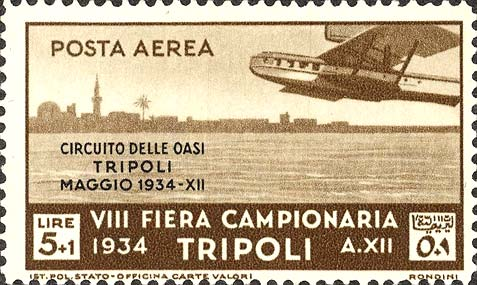
Stamp celebrating the 1934 Tripoli Grand Prix.

With Italy exerting further control over its North African holdings, including the appointment of Marshal of the Air Force Italo Balbo as Governor-General and the joining of Italian Cyrenaica and Italian Tripolitania into a single colony, Libya, the event gained even more spectacle. The participants were treated like royalty, staying in luxury at the Hotel Uaddan with its casino and dinner theater and being entertained by Marshal Balbo at his palace. All this led driver Dick Seaman to describe Mellaha Lake as the "Ascot of motor racing circuits", and coupled with its substantial total prize, it is easy to see why the Tripoli Grand Prix became such a popular date on the calendar.

=== 1933 – Accusation of corruption ===
The Grand Prix was held in conjunction with the Libyan state lottery and, in the case of the inaugural Mellaha Lake event, there have long been accusations of result fixing. From October 1932 to 16 April 1933, the government sold 12 lire lottery tickets and, after taking their cut, they put up the rest as the prize for a special lottery based on the outcome of the race. Thirty attendance tickets were drawn at random eight days before the event and assigned to a corresponding race entry. The holder of the winner's entry would receive three million lire, second place two million, and third one million. The story, first publicized in Alfred Neubauer's 1958 book Speed Was My Life (Männer, Frauen und Motoren: Die Erinnerungen des Mercedes-Rennleiters), alleged that Tazio Nuvolari, Achille Varzi and Baconin Borzacchini, along with their respective ticket holders, conspired to decide the outcome of the race in order to split some seven and a half million lire together. Research suggests that the story is a popular myth invented by Neubauer, who was not even present.

=== 1934–1938 ===
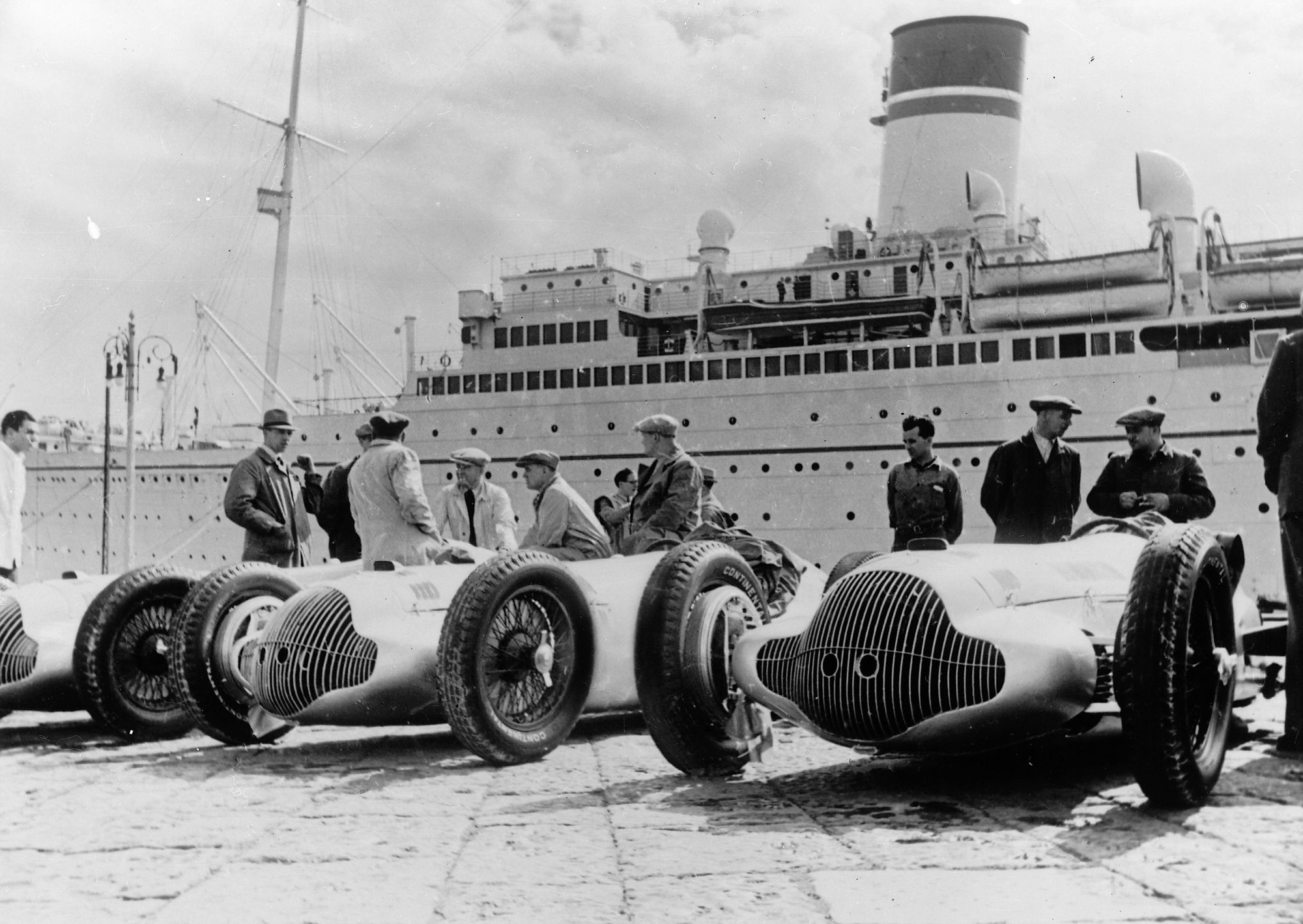
Three 1938 Mercedes-Benz W154 after landing in Tripoli

From 1933 to 1938, the Tripoli Grand Prix was run to the Formula Libre standard, meaning that no weight or engine restrictions were enforced on what was then one of the fastest track in the world. From 1935 onwards, the German Silver Arrows Grand Prix cars dominated. With cars racing with well over 500 hp in the 1937 Grand Prix season, and Hermann Lang winning in a 8-cylinder Mercedes-Benz W125, engine size for Grand Prix motor racing was limited to 3000cc for 1938 onwards. The new V12 Mercedes-Benz W154 still had only half the capacity of the W125, but still over 450 hp, and won with Hermann Lang.

=== 1939–1940 ===
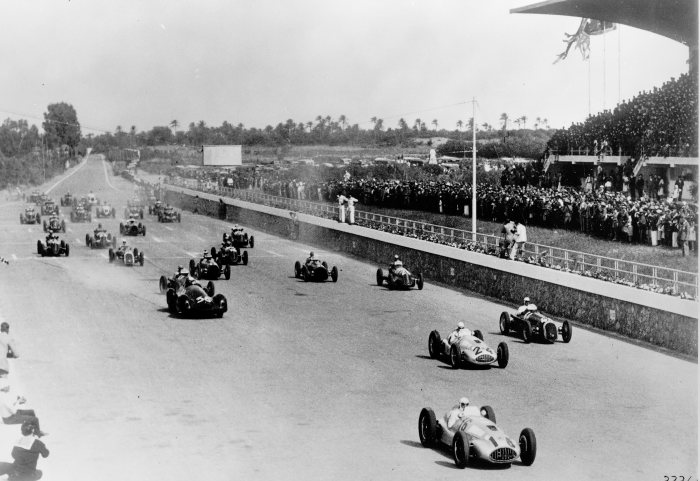
1939 start, two Mercedes-Benz W165 leading

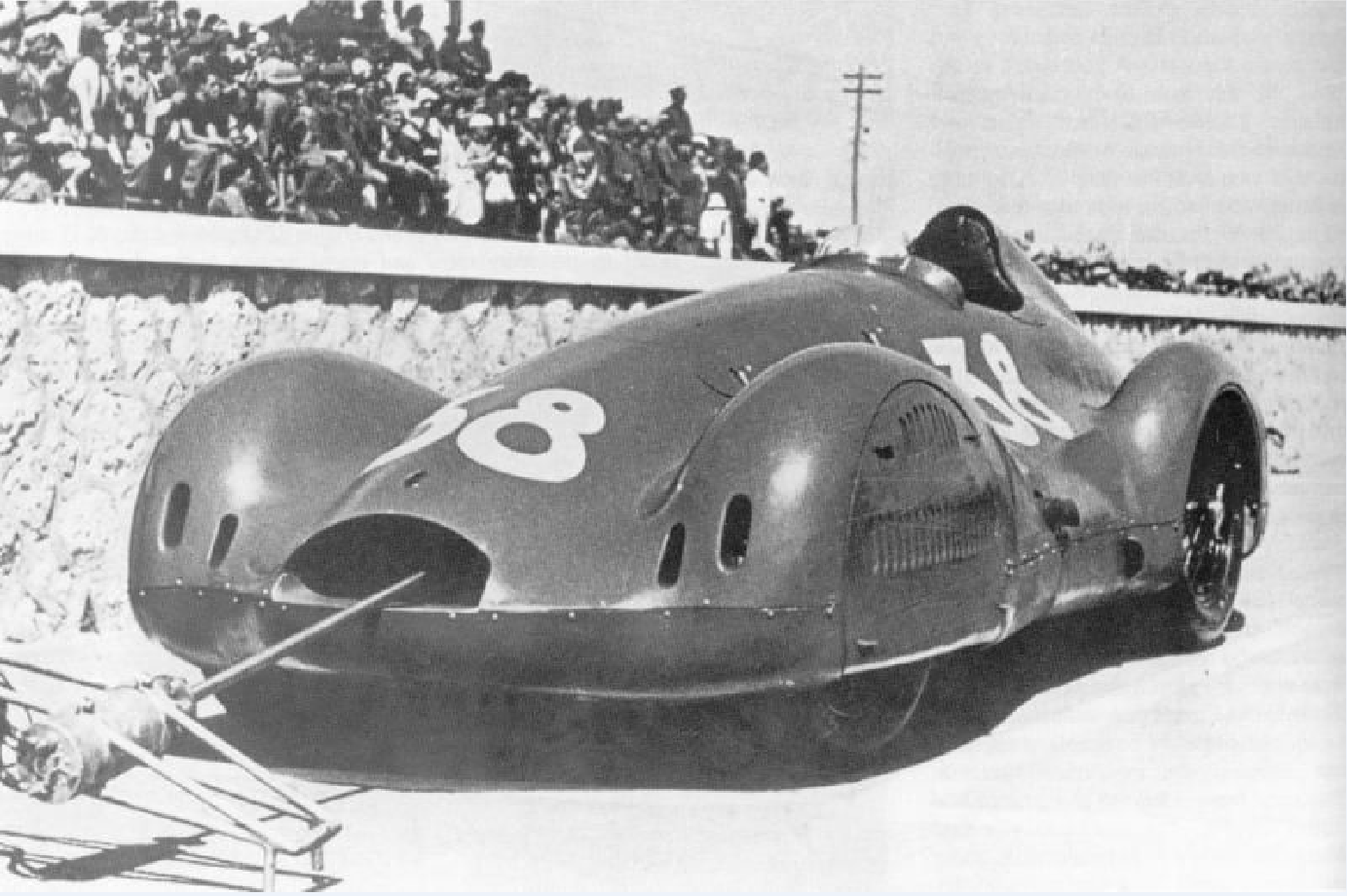
1939 Maserati 4CL Streamliner of Villoresi, with starter motor

In 1939 the Italians, tired of Germany's dominance, turned it into a Voiturette race for smaller, 1500cc supercharged cars, like the factory Alfa Romeo 158/159 Alfetta and Maserati 4CL and 4CLT, which even brought a Streamliner. Mercedes, believing that these rules might get adopted for GP racing, decided to invest in a new, smaller model, the V8-powered Mercedes-Benz W165. With only two cars entered, it was again Hermann Lang who won for a third straight time, in three different cars complying to different rules.

On 12 May 1940, with the Phoney War just having ended and the Battle of France beginning, and Italy still neutral, only the factory Alfa Romeo 158 and Maserati 4CL teams plus some independent Maserati 6CMs were in attendance, 23 in total. In the all-Italian race with some well-known names like Nuvolari and Ascari, Giuseppe Farina was fastest in practice and took his only major pre-war victory. It was a last and pyrrhic result for the Italians, because the Tripoli Grand Prix was never held again with the onset of World War II and fighting in the Mediterranean and Middle East theatre of World War II.

== Winners ==
=== By year ===
Year	Driver	Constructor	Location	Report
1940	(Italy) Giuseppe Farina	Alfa Romeo	Mellaha	Report
1939	(Germany) Hermann Lang	Mercedes-Benz	Mellaha	Report
1938	(Germany) Hermann Lang	Mercedes-Benz	Mellaha	Report
1937	(Germany) Hermann Lang	Mercedes-Benz	Mellaha	Report
1936	(Italy) Achille Varzi	Auto Union	Mellaha	Report
1935	(Germany) Rudolf Caracciola	Mercedes-Benz	Mellaha	Report
1934	(Italy) Achille Varzi	Alfa Romeo	Mellaha	Report
1933	(Italy) Achille Varzi	Bugatti	Mellaha	Report
1930	(Italy) Baconin Borzacchini	Maserati	Tripoli	Report
1929	(Italy) Gastone Brilli-Peri	Talbot	Tripoli	Report
1928	(Italy) Tazio Nuvolari	Bugatti	Tripoli	Report
1927	(Italy) Emilio Materassi	Bugatti	Tripoli	Report
1926	(France) François Eysermann	Bugatti	Tripoli	Report
1925	(Italy) Renato Balestrero	OM	Tripoli	Report

== See also ==
- Italian Libya
- Mellaha Air Base, the airbase that was built inside the circuit.
- Mitiga International Airport
