= Peerless V-16 =

1930s automobile

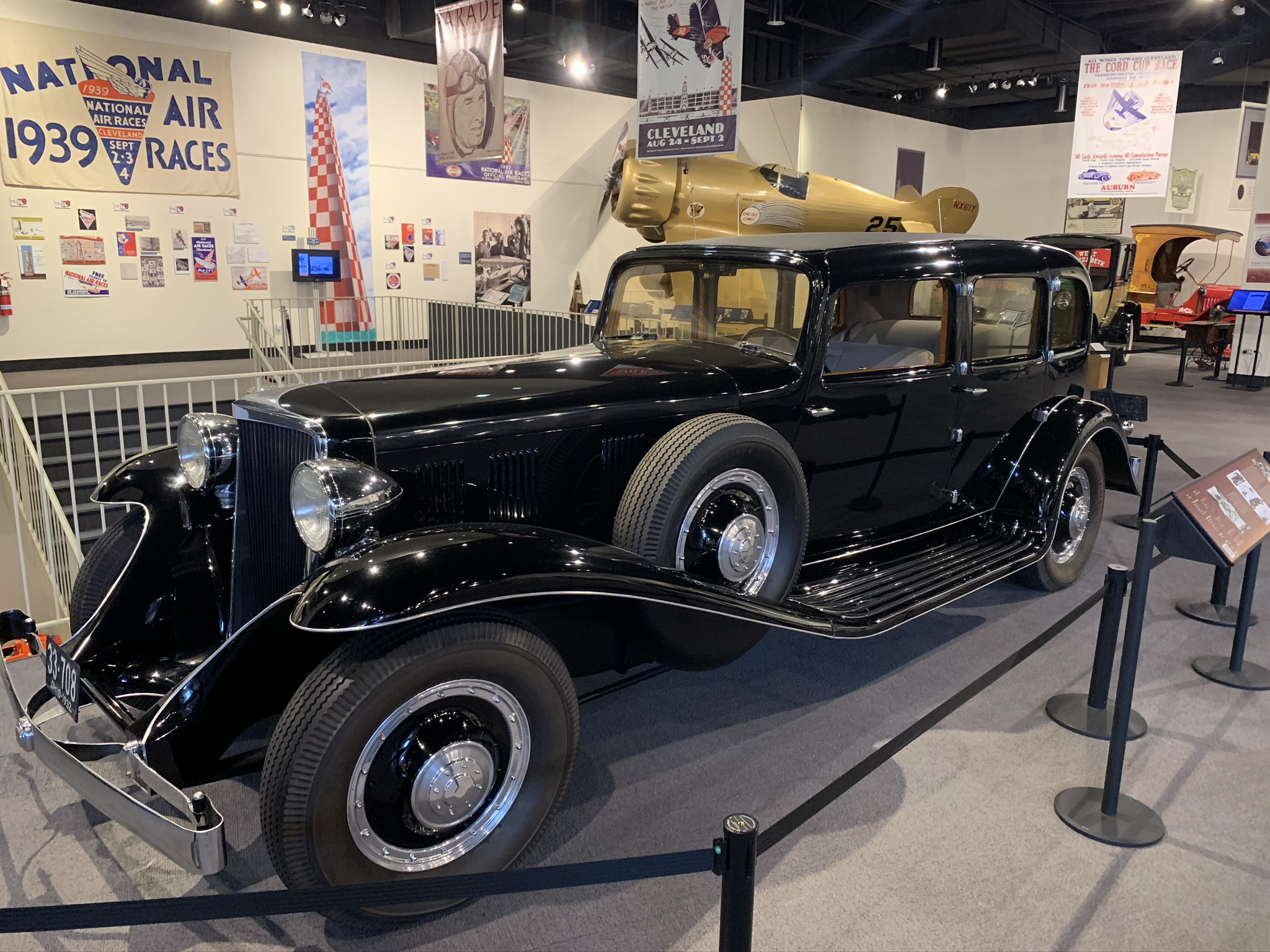

Overview
- Manufacturer: Peerless Motor Company
- Production: 1932; Only one model built
- Assembly: Cleveland, Ohio, United States
- Designer: Franklin Q. Hershey

Body and chassis
- Class: Ultra-luxury car
- Body style: Coachbuilt to owner's preference

Powertrain
- Engine: 464.6 cu in (7.6 L) V16
- Transmission: 3-speed manual

Dimensions
- Wheelbase: 3,683.0 mm (145 in)
- Curb weight: 4,000 lb (1,800 kg), depending on body style and coachwork

The Peerless V-16 (also known as Peerless Sixteen) is a luxury automobile made by American manufacturer Peerless Motor Company in 1932. It represented the company's ambitious final attempt to compete in the ultra-luxury segment during the Great Depression by introducing a 16-cylinder engine, joining the ranks of Cadillac and Marmon. Only a single fully bodied styling prototype was completed before Peerless ceased automobile production entirely in 1932 and repurposed its factory for brewing Carling beer. The surviving car is notable for its extensive use of aluminum in both the engine and bodywork, resulting in a relatively lightweight design for its class at 42lbs.

== Development ==
Peerless Motor Company was a luxury automobile brand born in Cleveland in 1900 as part of the even older Peerless Wringer & Manufacturing Company. At its heyday, the company was one of the "three Ps" alongside Packard and Pierce-Arrow Motor Car Company.

By the late 1920s, the company faced declining sales due the Great Depression, falling from 25th to 30th place among American car manufacturers between 1928 and 1930. In 1929, the company hired Alexis de Sakhnoffsky for their 1930 line, as the company sought to revitalize its image with a technologically advanced luxury car to compete with the Marmon Sixteen and Cadillac V-16.

Peerless recruited engineering talent with experience from Marmon which had developed its own V16, including their new president, James Alvin Bohannon, who joined Peerless in 1929 after working for several years at Marmon. Peerless collaborated with the Aluminum Company of America (ALCOA) to explore lightweight materials. The company was already acquainted with aluminum, as since 1905 the company was using aluminium bodies in most of its vehicles.

Development included several engineering chassis. Four chassis were reportedly sent to Murphy for bodying: some equipped with aluminum frames, one with a V12 engine, and three with the new V16 powerplant. The single complete styling prototype a four-door, five passenger sedan was finished around mid 1932 on a 145-inch (3,683 mm) wheelbase and a weight of 42lb. Designs for other body styles, such as coupes, roadsters, and convertibles, were also prepared but not built. The project was led in styling by 22-year-old Franklin Hershey, for whom this was a major early assignment.

Despite the advanced engineering, the worsening economy made volume production of an expensive V16 luxury car unfeasible. Peerless halted automobile manufacturing in June 30th, 1931 and the facility remained idle for two years. In 1933, Peerless converted its facilities into a brewery, capitalizing on the impending end of Prohibition. The V16 project was canceled, and the prototype remained with the company for years before entering private and museum collections.

The prototype still exists today, present in Crawford Auto-Aviation Museum. In 2023, it was featured in a Concours d'Elegance at Copshawholm.

== See also ==
- Marmon Sixteen
- Cadillac V-16
