= Ricardo PLC =

UK based engineering company

Ricardo
- Formerly: Engine Patents
- Type: Subsidiary
- Traded as: LSE: RCDO
- ISIN: GB0007370074
- Industry: Automotive, Clean energy, Defence, Marine
- Founded: 1915; 111 years ago
- Headquarters: Shoreham-by-Sea, England
- Key people: Jason Oms O'Donnell (CEO)
- Revenue: ▲£474.7 million (2023/2024)
- Operating income: ▲£38.8 million (2023/2024)
- Net income: ▲£0.8 million (2023/2024)
- Owner: WSP Global
- Website: ricardo.com

Ricardo is a British firm that provides automotive parts and engineering, environmental and strategic consultancy services. Founded by Harry Ricardo, it is based at Shoreham-by-Sea, West Sussex.

Previously listed on the London Stock Exchange, the company was acquired by the Canadian consulting firm WSP Global in October 2025.

== History ==
=== Early history ===
The company was founded by Harry Ricardo as Engine Patents Limited in February 1915. Later that same year, amid the First World War, the company helped develop a 600 brake horsepower (450 kW) piston engine for a flying boat. In spring 1916, it helped with the design of a device to manoeuvre 25 tonnes (28 tons) battle tanks into position aboard railway wagons. Later in 1916, the company designed a four-stroke crosshead-type engine, capable of producing 150 brake horsepower (110 kW), to power the Mark V tank; this engine emitted no visible smoke and thus made the tank less detectable by the enemy. In April 1917, the first engine was completed; quantity production was quickly established, permitting one hundred engines per week to be manufactured by the end of that year.

By 1919, the company had set up a laboratory at Shoreham by Sea. Around this time, the company's name was changed to Ricardo and Co. During the 1920s, it developed a side-valve engine, which minimised the clearance between the piston and cylinder head thereby achieving all the advantages of overhead-valve engines without the cost. This new type of engine, known as the turbulent head, was patented (following protracted legal action) in 1932.

During the late 1920s, Ricardo designed a six-cylinder diesel engine that was capable of producing 130 brake horsepower (97 kW); manufactured by AEC, it was quickly adopted to power buses serving London, as well as long distance coaches and lorries. This type of engine, branded as The Comet, was taken up by numerous European vehicle manufacturers, including Berliet and Citroën of France, MAN of Germany, and Fiat and Breda of Italy, among others.

In the 1930s, the company undertook work to convert a Kestrel V12 to diesel operation using single sleeve valve technology: Captain George Eyston used the new engine in the Flying Spray, which, at 159 miles per hour (256 km/h), broke the world diesel speed record at Bonneville in May 1936.

Also in the 1930s, Henry Tizard, Chairman of the Aeronautical Research Committee, who was a proponent of a high-powered "sprint" engine for fighter aircraft and who had foreseen the need for such a powerplant with the threat of German air power looming, encouraged Ricardo to develop what eventually became the Rolls-Royce Crecy engine. In 1931, Harry Ricardo gave a lecture to the Royal Society of Arts, in which he invited his audience to "accompany me inside the cylinder of a diesel engine", passionately describing the process of diesel combustion, in great detail. In 1938, the company developed the V-16 engine for the Alfa Romeo Tipo 162, a car with highly streamlined bodywork.

Ricardo's experience was drawn on for multiple initiatives during the Second World War; substantial research work was contracted to the firm. Specifically, Ricardo's involvement in the development of jet propulsion is believed to have been as early as 1940. In 1941, the company developed a relief valve, subsequently named "Barostat", which automatically reduced the pressure in the fuel lines as the aircraft gained altitude, thereby avoiding the risk of the engine overspeeding: the ground-breaking Gloster E.28/39 jet-powered aircraft, designed by Frank Whittle, used this device. Ricardo also assisted in the design of the combustion chambers and fuel control system of Whittle's jet engine.

=== Post-war ===
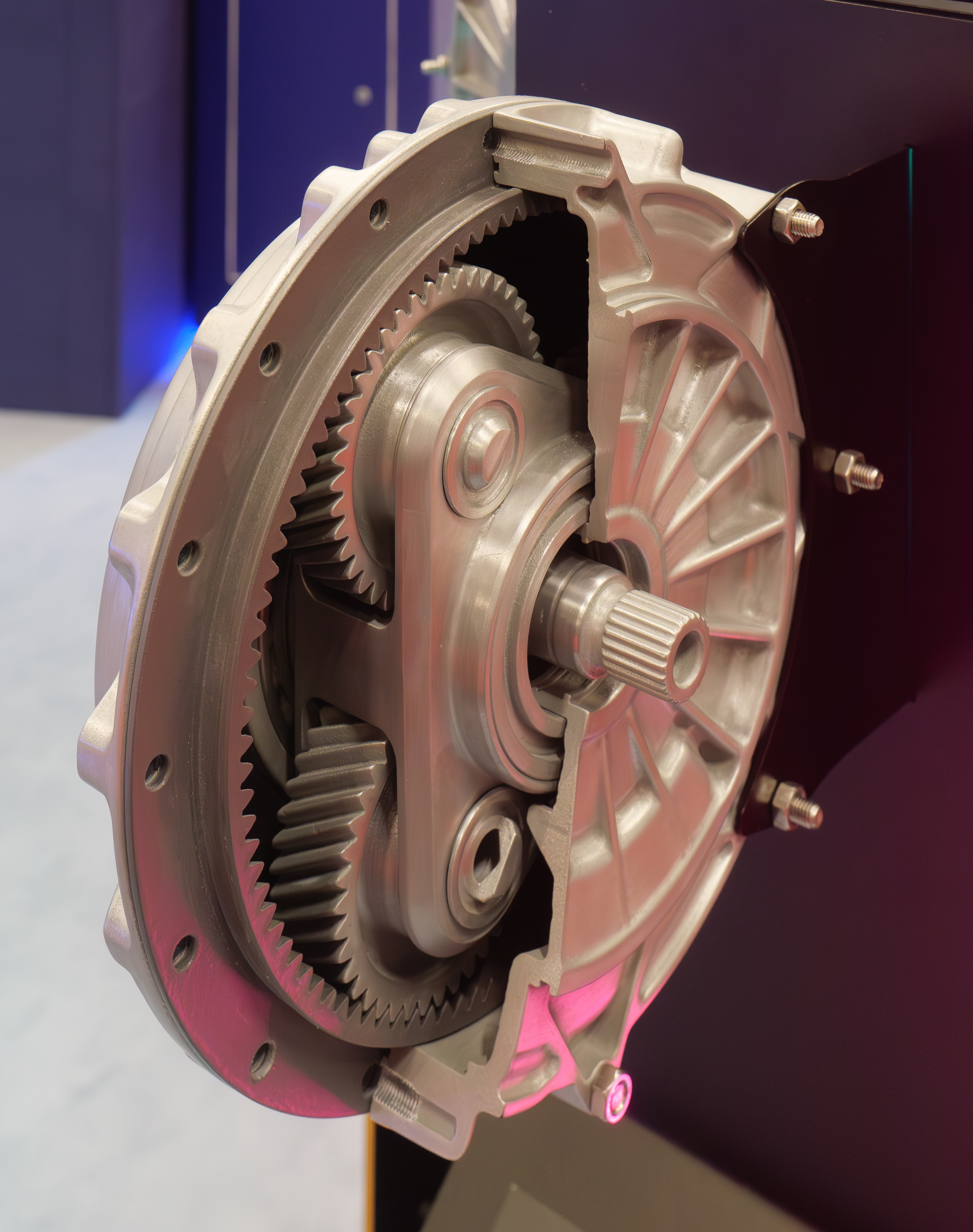
A cutaway model of a flywheel made by the company

In the years following the Second World War, Ricardo steadily grew in both activity and scope.

In the late 1940s, the company worked with the railway locomotive designer, Lieutenant Colonel Louis Frederick Rudston Fell, to develop an engine for the 4-8-4 Fell locomotive.

In 1968, the United States Navy placed a contract with the company to develop a diesel power unit capable of running for extended periods at ocean depths of up to 600 feet (180 m); the concept was known as "recycle diesel" and involved blending a proportion of exhaust gas with fresh oxygen.

During 1970, the company was rebranded as Ricardo Consulting Engineers. Shortly thereafter, it pioneered the use of Stirling engines for cars on behalf of the US Department of Energy. In the 1970s, Opel used Ricardo combustion-chamber technology for the Opel 2100D engine which was installed in the Opel Rekord Series D. General Motors used the same technology in the Chevrolet Suburban in the 1980s.

Since its creation in 1973, Ricardo has been involved in the National Chemical Emergency Centre.

The company also continued to be an active participant in the aeronautics sector. In 1986, Ricardo redesigned the engine for the Rutan Voyager, the first aircraft to fly around the world without refuelling.

By 1990, Ricardo had in excess of 90 test-beds at its Shoreham-by-Sea research facility; these comprising rolling roads and anechoic chambers amongst other specialized test rigs. These facilities reportedly enabled the company to develop engines of almost every type (petrol, diesel, or spark-ignited gas) and size from 5 hp two-stroke chainsaw engines up to 5,000hp diesel locomotive propulsion units.

In 1990, the company undertook the development of an automatic layshaft transmission as part of an integrated power-train control system. Shortly thereafter, Ferrari commissioned Ricardo to develop an automatic version of the 456GT four-seater coupé.

During 1994, the company acquired a major developer of four-wheel drive technology, FF Developments; this business formed the basis of the company's driveline operations in the UK.

=== 21st century ===
In the early 21st century, the company undertook work to improve the BMW K1200 series motorcycle engines which were subsequently fitted to the BMW Motorrad K1300S, K1300GT and K1300R models.

In August 2006, Wing Commander Andy Green successfully achieved a new diesel speed record of 350.092 miles per hour (563.418 km/h) at Bonneville Salt Flats in Utah, in the JCB Dieselmax with the aid of a diesel engine designed with Ricardo combustion-chamber technology.

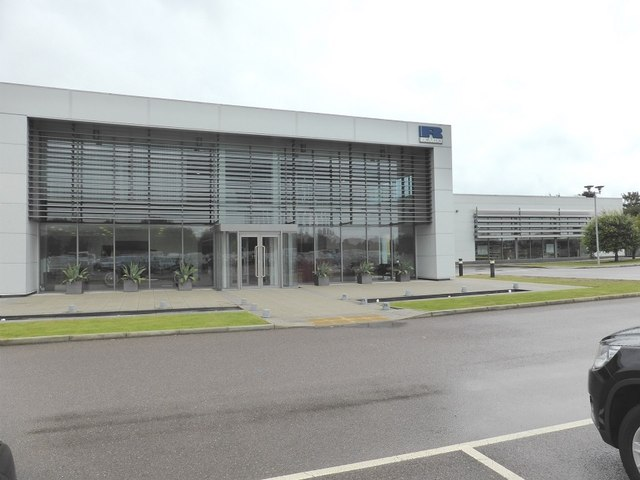
The reception building at Shoreham-by-Sea

Two years later, the firm developed an engine that was capable of switching between two-stroke and four-stroke cycles in collaboration with Denso, Jaguar Land Rover and the Centre for Automotive Engineering at the University of Brighton: it was claimed that this engine could improve fuel economy by up to 25%. The company collaborated with Xtrac by assisting with some parts manufacture for the 1044 gearbox, supplied in 2010 to three Formula One teams: Lotus, Virgin and HRT. This gearbox was mated to the Cosworth CA2010 engine.

In 2009, McLaren Automotive selected Ricardo to develop a new engine, a 3.8 litre twin-turbo V8, which became known as the McLaren M838T, for its supercars. At around the same time, the company working in collaboration with Israel Aerospace Industries, developed a semi-robotic tug, Taxibot, which clamped around the aircraft's nosewheel and was controlled remotely by the pilot; the product was intended to reduce aviation fuel consumption.

The Ministry of Defence selected a vehicle developed by Ricardo and Force Protection, known as Foxhound, to replace the Snatch Land Rover in 2010.

In 2011, Ricardo developed a carbon-fibre flywheel with a magnetic coupling and gearing system for energy-storage purposes: the product was known as "TorqStor".

In November 2012, it was announced that Ricardo had agreed terms to purchase the distressed consultancy firm AEA Technology in exchange for £18 million. Following the completion of the acquisition, it was rebranded as Ricardo-AEA. While Ricardo took on the environmental business and many of the staff, integrating them into its own operations, the large pension liability built up from when AEA Technology was much larger and unsupportable by the smaller residual company, was transferred to the UK Government's Pension Protection Fund. Within one year of the acquisition, Ricardo-AEA was reporting positive fiscal performance alongside expansion within the UK and international markets. In September 2015, Ricardo-AEA was rebranded as Ricardo Energy & Environment.

Throughout the 2010s, Ricardo became increasingly active in the offshore wind turbine sector. In February 2012, it was announced the company had signed a deal with the gearing specialist David Brown to provide a range of engineering support services for the design and manufacture of a innovative 7MW gearbox. During 2019, Ricardo announced that it was standing up a dedicated team that will focus on offshore wind energy opportunities.

In April 2015, the company acquired Lloyd's Register Rail in exchange for £42.5 million, with the intention of developing the company's rail expertise.

By 2017, Ricardo was reporting a turnover of £330 million and employed nearly 3,000 people in the UK, US, China, Japan, Germany and the Czech Republic. Furthermore, the firm was engaged in the manufacture of gearboxes for the world’s fastest street-legal production car (made by Bugatti) as well as producing engines for McLaren Automotive. As a result of diversification efforts, the company was also actively engaged in consultancy on both technical and environmental matters, software development and niche manufacturing.

In June 2025, Ricardo's board of directors recommended that shareholders accept a $670 million takeover offer made by the Canadian consultancy firm WSP. The acquisition was completed in October 2025.
