= Alfa Romeo Tipo 512 =

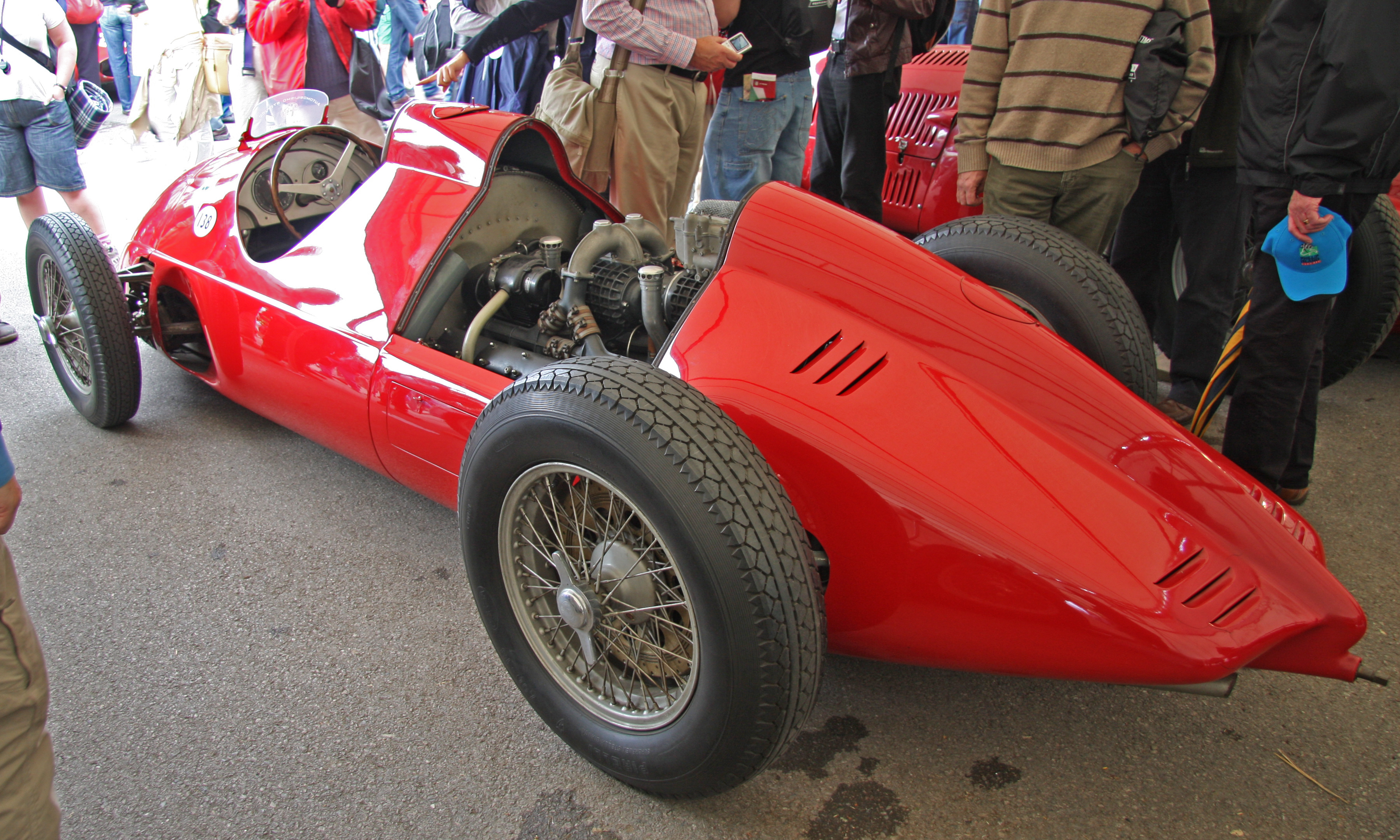
- Category: Voiturette
- Constructor: Alfa Romeo
- Designer: Wifredo Ricart / Gioacchino Colombo
- Successor: Alfa Romeo 158

Technical specifications
- Chassis: Single-seater, tubular frame
- Suspension (front): wishbones, longitudinal torsion bar, friction dampers, hydraulic shock absorbers
- Suspension (rear): De-Dion-axle, longitudinal torsion bar, friction dampers, telescopic shock absorbers
- Axle track: Front:1,320 mm (52.0 in); Rear:1,310 mm (51.6 in)
- Wheelbase: 2,450 mm (96.5 in)
- Engine: 1489 cc V12 180° Roots-type supercharger Mid-mounted, longitudinal; 335 bhp (250 kW) @ 8600 rpm
- Transmission: 5-speed manual
- Weight: 710 kg (1,570 lb)

Competition history

The Alfa Romeo Tipo 512 was intended to replace the Alfa Romeo 158 Voiturette racing car. It was designed by Wifredo Ricart as his second car for Alfa Romeo after the V16 engined Alfa Romeo Tipo 162.

It was the first mid-engined Alfa Romeo intended racing car. It was fitted with a flat 12 engine (technically speaking it is a 180 degree V12) using a mid-engine layout. With two Roots-type superchargers, the engine could produce up to 225 bhp (168 kW) per litre. The engine had very short stroke compared to other Grands Prix cars at that time, only 54.2 millimetres (2.13 in) (bore 54mm).

On June 19, 1940, Alfa Romeo's test driver Attilio Marinoni was killed while testing the 512 suspension fitted to an Alfetta 158.

Later, on September 12, 1940, the Tipo 512 was first tested, by Alfa Romeo chief test driver Consalvo Sanesi; despite being very powerful its handling was not thought to be good enough.

Car development was stopped during World War II. Another chassis was built, but that car never raced. Both prototypes are currently on display at the Alfa Romeo Historical Museum in Arese, Italy.

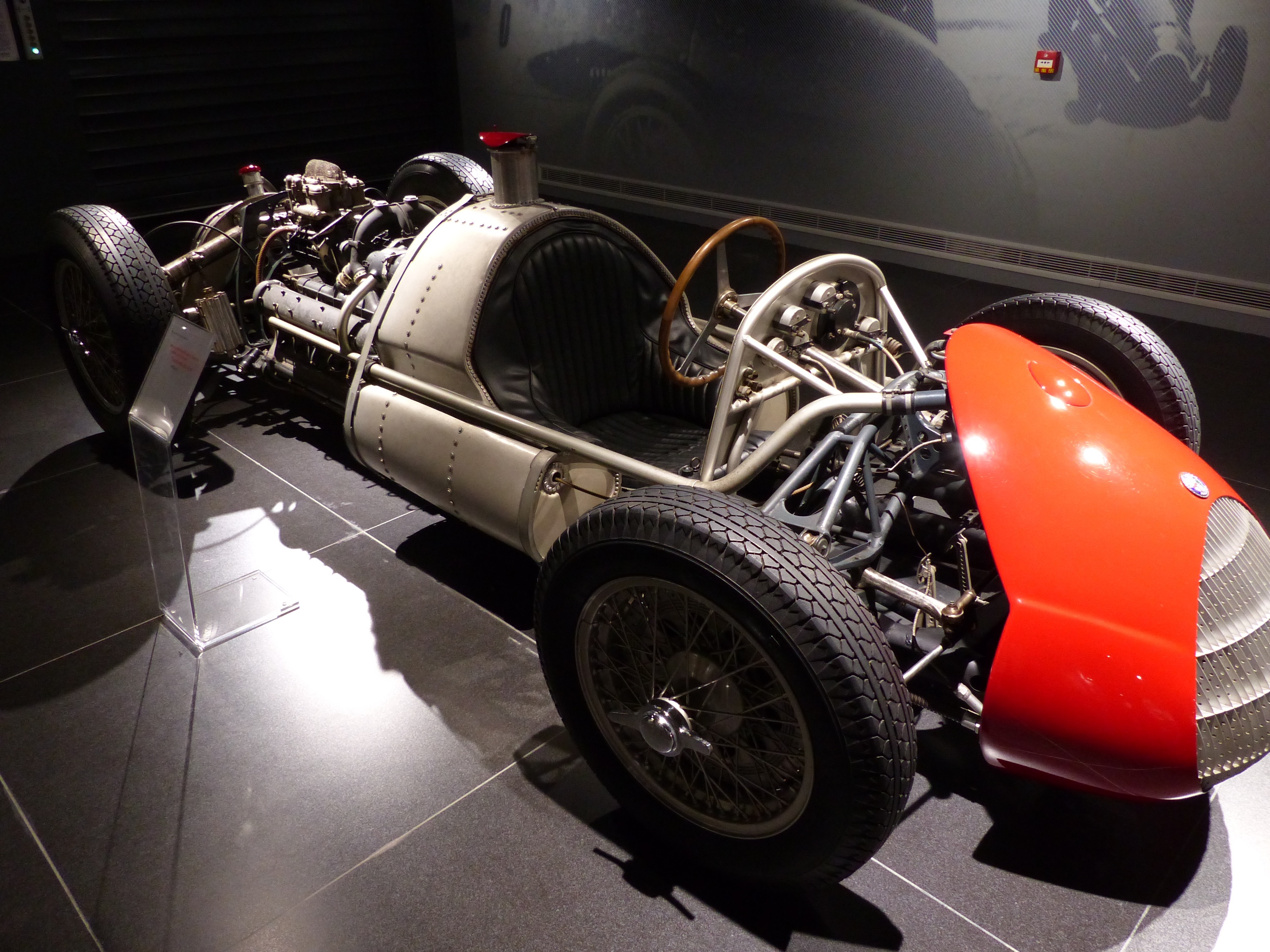
Alfa Romeo GP Tipo 512 1940 Museo Storico

The potential of this machine is not very clear, since it remained an unraced prototype. The power of the engine measured at the bench was 335 bhp (250 kW) at 8600 rpm. In the Alfa Romeo museum in Arese, alongside the 512 displayed, is the following data: maximum power (estimated) 500 hp (373 kW) at 11,000 rpm and maximum speed over 350 km/h (217 mph).

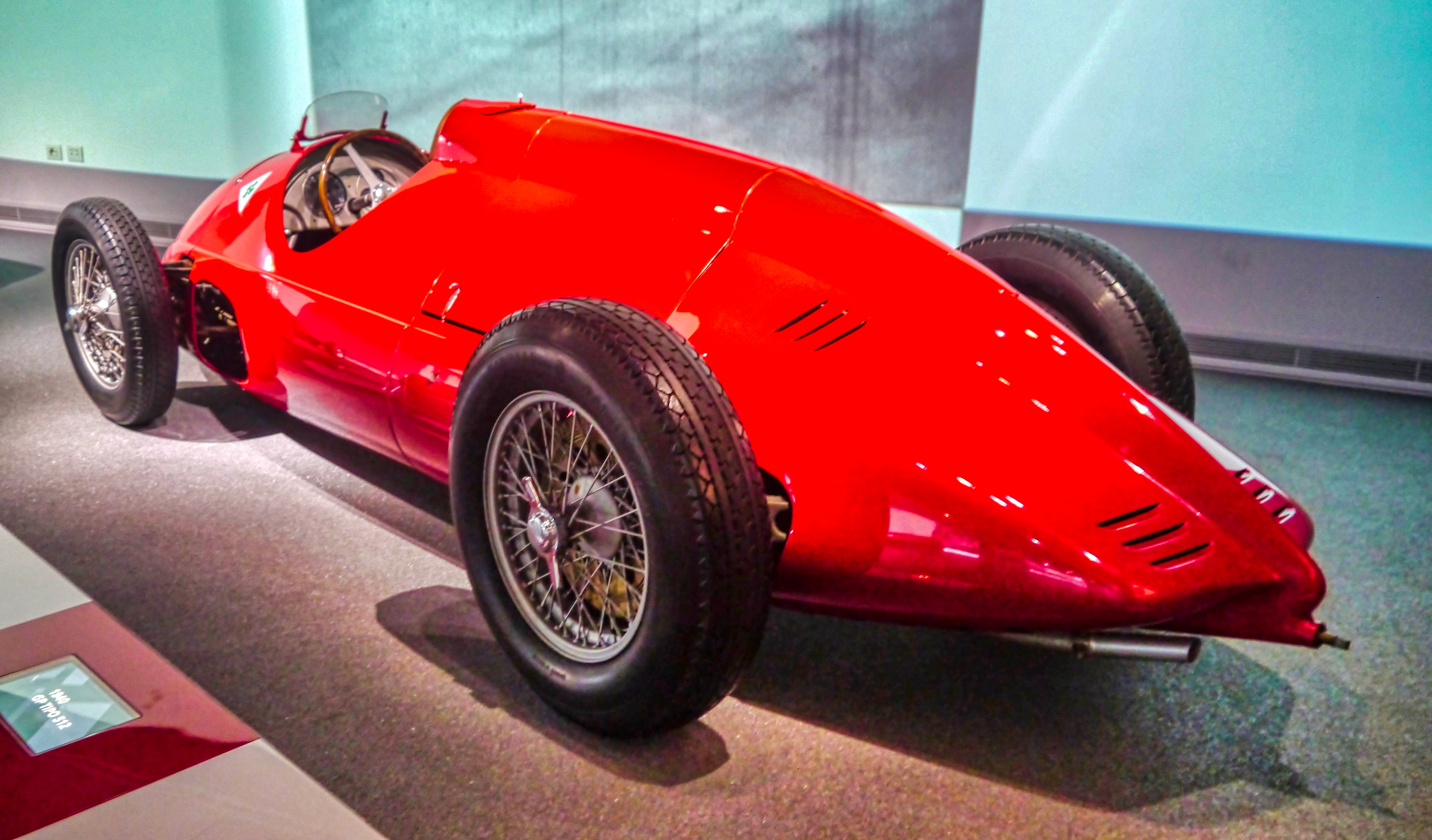
Alfa Romeo Museum, Arese, province of Milan, Region of Lombardy, Italy

Alfa Romeo eventually won the Formula 1 World Championship with the Alfetta 158 in 1950, taking the place for which the 512 was originally designed.

== Technical data ==
Technical data	Tipo 512
Engine:	12-cylinder 180° V-engine
Engine displacement:	1489 cm^{3}
Bore x stroke:	54 x 54.2 mm
Max power:	335 hp at 8 600 rpm
Valve control:	2 overhead camshafts per cylinder row, 2 valves per cylinder
Supercharger:	Roots compressor
Gearbox:	5-speed manual
Chassis:	Trusssram
Front suspension:	Double cross links, longitudinal torsion bars
Rear suspension:	De Dion shaft, Watt link, longitudinal torsion bars
Brakes:	Hydraulic drum brakes
Wheelbase:	245 cm
Dry weight:	710 kg
