= Marmon Sixteen =

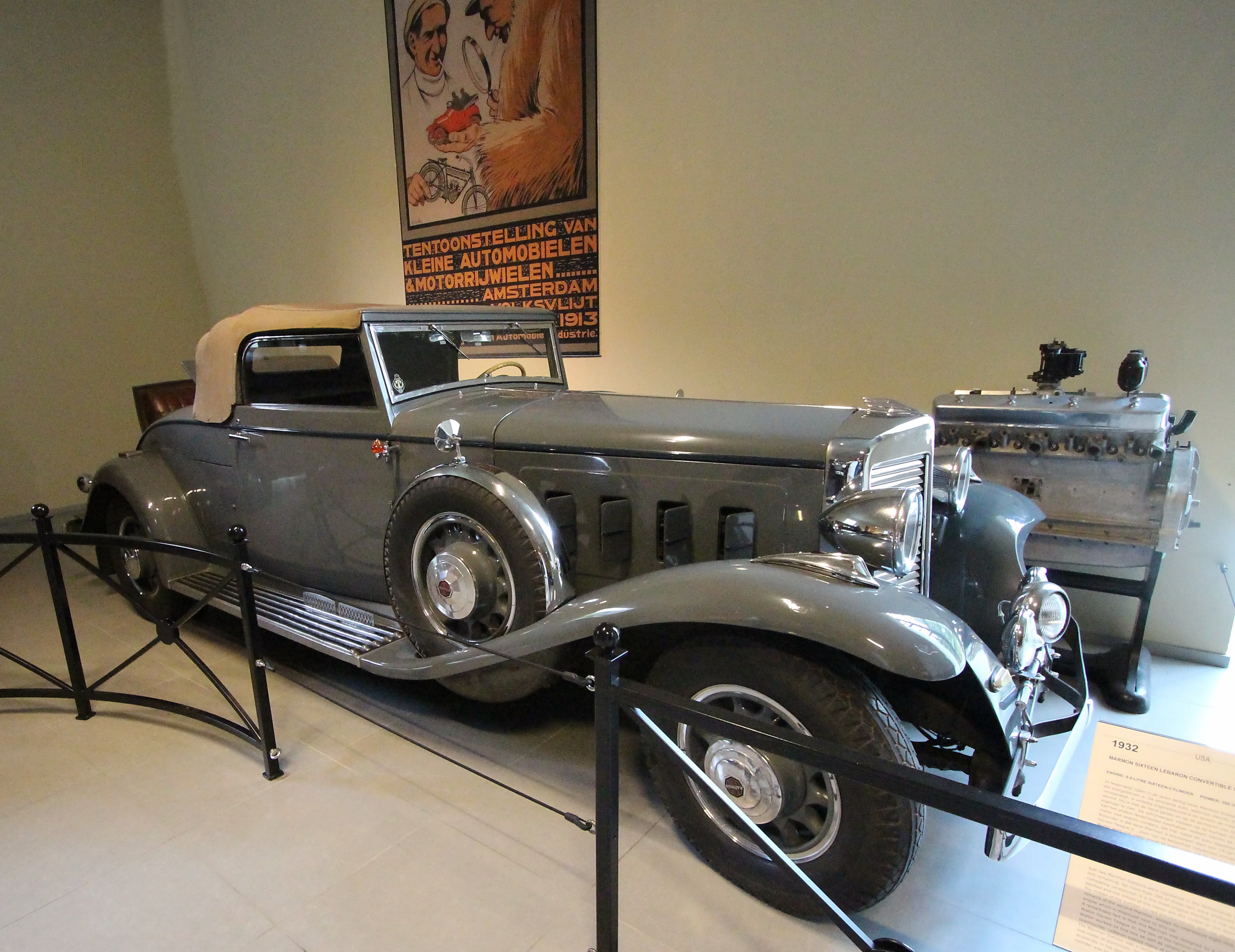
- 1933 Marmon Sixteen Lebaron Convertible Coupe

Overview
- Manufacturer: Marmon Motor Car Company
- Production: 1931–1934; 390 produced
- Assembly: Indianapolis, Indiana, United States
- Designer: Walter Dorwin Teague

Body and chassis
- Class: Ultra-luxury car
- Body style: Coachbuilt to owner's preference

Powertrain
- Engine: 491 cu in (8.0 L) V16
- Transmission: 3-speed manual

Dimensions
- Wheelbase: 3,733.8 mm (147 in) (Limousine); 3,683.0 mm (145 in) (Standard); 3,632.2 mm (143 in) (Victoria Coupe)
- Curb weight: 5,090–5,480 lb (2,310–2,490 kg), depending on body style and coachwork

The Marmon Sixteen was produced between 1931 and 1934. Howard Marmon had begun working on the world's first V16 engine in 1927. By the time the Sixteen was introduced Cadillac had already debuted their V-16, designed by ex-Marmon engineer Owen Nacker. Peerless, too, had been developing a V16 with help from an ex-Marmon engineer, James Bohannon.

The Sixteen's engine displaced 491 in^{3} (8.0 L) and produced 200 hp (149 kW). It was an all-aluminum design with steel cylinder liners and a 45° bank angle. The car's body was designed by Walter Dorwin Teague in 1930, with assistance from his son.
