= Frank Hershey =

American automobile designer

Franklin Quick Hershey (1907–1997) was an American automobile designer and student of General Motors Vice President of Design Harley Earl. Hershey is known for his 1932 Peerless V-16 prototype, 1949 Cadillac tailfins, and the 1955 Ford Thunderbird.

== Early life and education ==
Hershey was born in Michigan, and raised in Beverly Hills and La Puente, California. He attended Occidental College where he majored in forestry.

== Career ==
Hershey began his career at Murphy Coachworks of Pasadena, California, under the guidance of Frank Spring. While at Murphy, he was assigned the task of designing the 1932 Peerless X-D V-16 prototype.

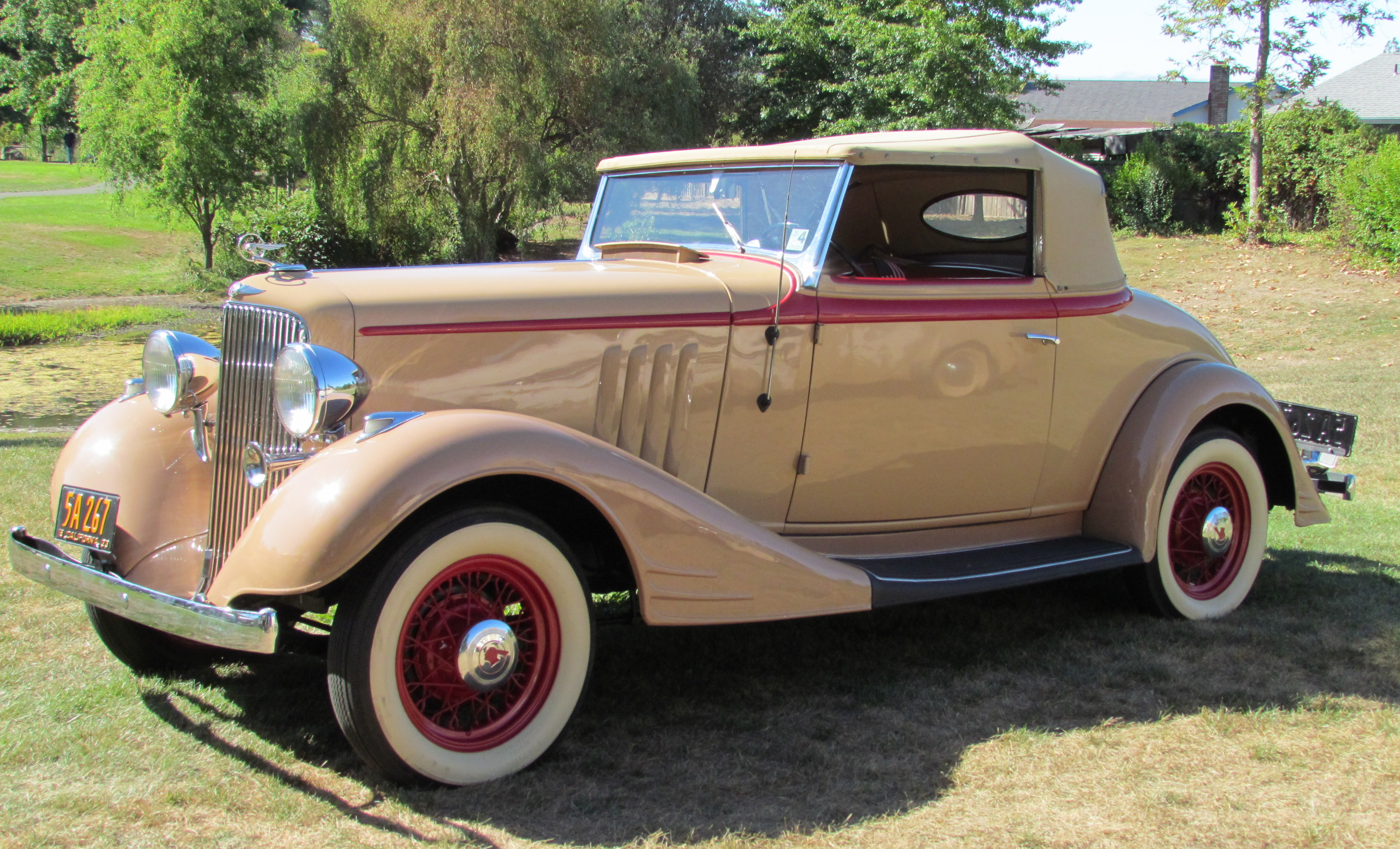
1933 Pontiac 8

From Murphy, Hershey went to work for GM where he focused on the 1933 Pontiac. In designing the 1935 Pontiac, he introduced the Silver Streak design theme that the make would continue until 1956. He also was assigned to GM's Opel design offices in Germany in 1936, and GM's Holden make in Australia.

Hershey served in the Navy during World War II.

After leaving GM, Hershey set up his own design firm. Harley Earl attempted to lure him back to GM. He chose not to return only to learn years later that had he returned he would have been Earl's first choice to replace him as GM's Vice President of Design.

After several years with Packard, he went to Ford where he designed the 1953-1957 full sized Fords. According to an interview given by Hershey to James W. Howell in 1995, George Walker had been hired as the public face of Ford design. In a 1954 interview, Hershey said he designed the landmark Ford Thunderbird, which created friction between Walker and Hershey.

After leaving Ford, Hershey also worked for Kaiser Aluminum and Rite Autotronics, heading design efforts in both companies.

== Personal life ==
Hershey was married and the father of two children. He died in California on October 20, 1997.

== Sources ==
- Sherman, Pat (March 8, 2007). "Frank Hershey — the gay designer behind the Ford Thunderbird". Gay and Lesbian Times. Archived from the original on 2007-03-15.
- Howell, James W. and Hershey, Franklin Q. "Franklin Q. Hershey's Murphy-Bodied Peerless V-16 Prototype" Collectible Automobile, Volume 12, Number 4, December 1995. pp. 56–63.
- Kimes, Beverly R., Editor. Clark, Henry A. (1996). The Standard Catalog of American Cars 1805-1945. Kraus Publications. ISBN 0-87341-428-4.
