= Alfa Romeo Tipo 162 =

- Constructor: Alfa Romeo
- Designer(s): Wifredo Ricart
- Predecessor: Alfa Romeo Tipo 316
- Successor: Alfa Romeo Tipo 512

Technical specifications
- Chassis: Chassis frame with steel frame bodywork
- Suspension (front): Independent suspension with screw springs and hydraulic shock absorbers
- Suspension (rear): De Dion shaft with reaction arms, longitudinal torsion springs and friction shock absorbers
- Engine: Alfa Romeo 2,995 cc (182.8 cu in) 135° V16 supercharged 490 hp (365 kW) @ 7800 rpm front engined, longitudinally mounted
- Transmission: Alfa 4-speed manual

Competition history
- Notable entrants: Alfa Corse
Races	Wins
0	0

The Alfa Romeo Tipo 162 was designed in 1939 by the Spanish engineer Wifredo Ricart as a replacement for the 60° V16 engined tipo 316. The Tipo 162 had an unusual 135° V16 engine and highly streamlined bodywork.

The engine was designed in Britain by Harry Ricardo, who had a good reputation for designing high-performance engines. The choice of Harry Ricardo was due not only to his reputation but to the fact that the Portello factory was busy producing engines for trucks and airplanes. The result was a square engine with 62 mm (2.4 in) bore and stroke, 2,995 cc (182.8 cu in) displacement with 2x 2-stage compressors and 2x triple inverted carburetors. The engine was tested on a test bench in the spring of 1940 and delivered 490 hp (370 kW) at 7,800 rpm.

The car had three fuel tanks, one behind the driver and one on each side of the driver, with a total capacity of 260 L (69 US gal; 57 imp gal).

Components were manufactured for a total of six cars, but when, on 10 June 1940, Italy declared war on France and Britain, only one car had been completed, that never participated in racing.

In 1941 Wifredo Ricart designed the Alfa Romeo 163, a dual-seat sports saloon prototype that employed technology such as further streamlining, a mid-mounted engine and lightened bodywork. The car in total weighed only 880 kg (1,940 lb), and it had a very low center of gravity. The engine was derived from the Alfa Romeo 162, but fuel was fed without superchargers. The revised engine delivered 190 hp (140 kW) at 7,400 rpm. Production of this car was also curtailed by the war.

== Technical data ==
Technical data	Tipo 162
Engine:	16-cylinder 135° V-engine
displacement:	2995 cm^{3}
Bore x stroke:	62 x 62 mm
Max power:	490 hp at 7 800 rpm
Valve control:	2 overhead camshafts per cylinder row, 4 valves per cylinder
Upload:	under pressure, 2 two-stage Roots compressor and 2 inverted triple-barrel carburetors
Gearbox:	4 gears + reverse
Chassis:	Trusssram
suspension front:	Double cross links, longitudinal torsion bars
suspension rear:	De Dion shaft, Watt link, longitudinal torsion bars
Brakes:	Hydraulic drum brakes
Wheelbase:	2625 cm
Dry weight:	880 kg
