= Peerless Motor Company =

American automobile manufacturer

Coordinates: 41.4932685°N 81.6203315°W

Peerless Motor Car Company
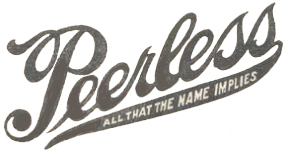
- Type: Automobile Manufacturing
- Industry: Automotive
- Founded: 1900; 126 years ago
- Defunct: 1932
- Fate: Became Peerless Corp. Brewers
- Headquarters: Cleveland, Ohio, United States
- Area served: United States
- Key people: Louis P. Mooers, Chief Engineer (1901–1905); Charles Schmidt, Chief Engineer (1905–1921)
- Products: Luxury automobiles automotive parts military vehicles

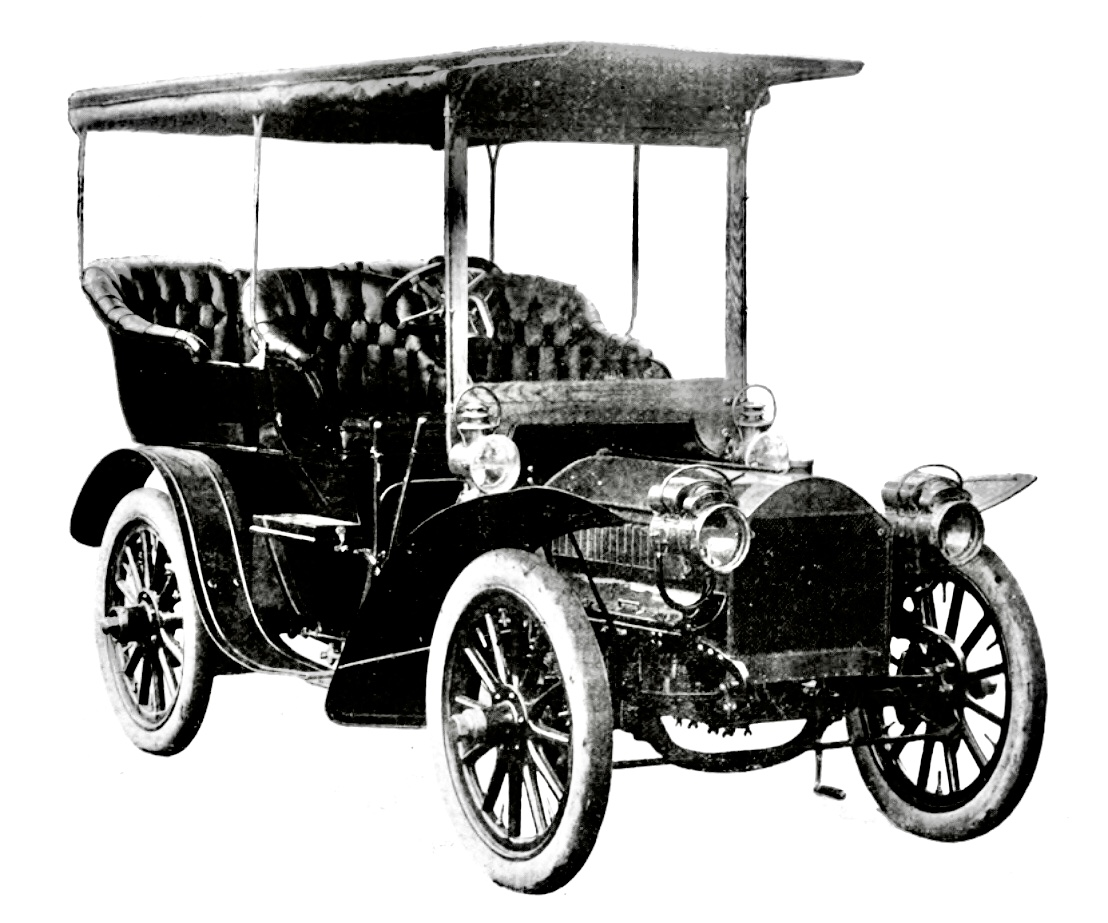
Peerless Type 8 (1904)

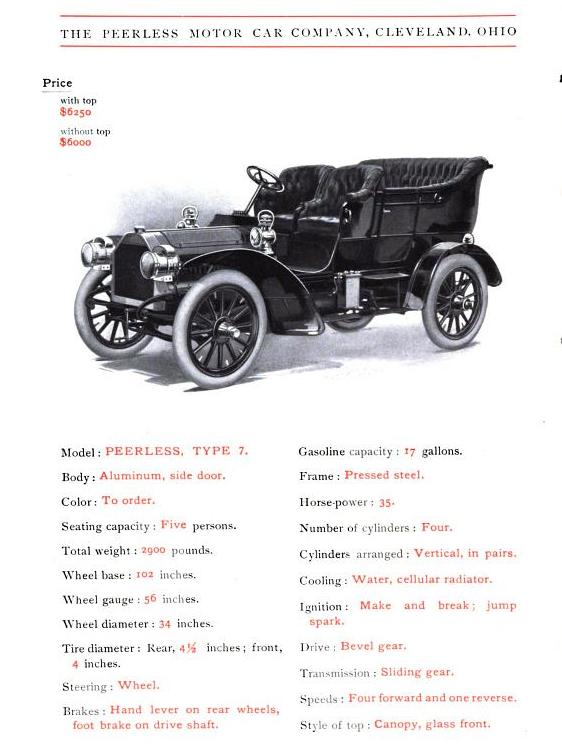
1905 Peerless Type 7

The Peerless Motor Car Company was an American automobile manufacturer in Cleveland, Ohio, from 1900 to 1931. One of the "Three Ps" – Packard, Peerless, and Pierce-Arrow – the company was known for building high-quality luxury automobiles. Peerless popularized a number of vehicle innovations that later became standard equipment, including drum brakes and the first enclosed-body production cars.

== History ==
Peerless Motors was established in Cleveland, Ohio, in 1900 at 43 Lisbon Street. It began manufacturing automobiles while using De Dion-Bouton engines under license from the French company. Engineer Louis P. Mooers designed the first Peerless models, as well as several proprietary engines. The first Peerless-branded vehicles appeared in 1902, with a front-mounted engine driving the rear wheels through a shaft. This later became the standard vehicle propulsion layout for automobiles. In 1904, Mooers designed the Green Dragon racecar and enlisted Barney Oldfield to drive it. The Green Dragon brought notability and success to Peerless, as Oldfield used it to set a number of early world automobile speed records.

In 1905, the 35 horsepower (26 kW) Green Dragon competed in the world's first 24-hour endurance race in Columbus, Ohio. Piloted by Earnest Bollinger, Aurther Feasel, and briefly by Barney Oldfield, the Peerless led the race for the first hour before crashing into a fence, later finishing in 3rd place.

From 1905 to 1907, Peerless experienced a rapid expansion in size and production volume. As the Peerless namesake grew in fame, the company began producing increasingly higher-priced models with a focus on luxury. In 1911, Peerless was one of the first car companies to introduce electric lighting on their vehicles, with electric starters added in 1913. In 1915, the firm introduced its first V8 engine, intending to compete with the Cadillac V8 introduced a year earlier. This model became Peerless' staple production vehicle until 1925, when engines produced by other manufacturers were first used in Peerless models.

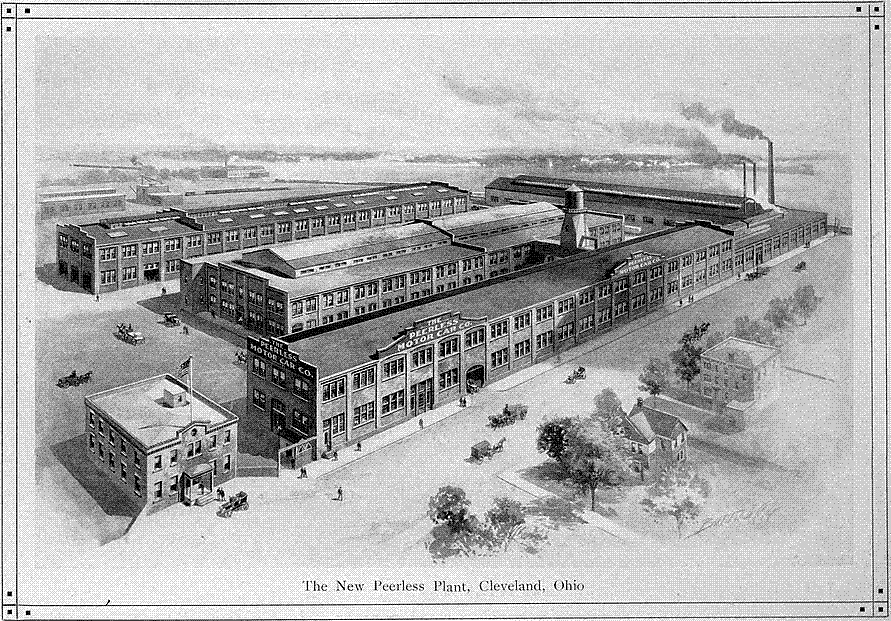
Peerless Motor Company factory in Cleveland, circa 1910s

During World War I, Peerless manufactured military vehicle chassis and trucks. The Peerless armoured car was manufactured for Great Britain, with Peerless supplying the chassis and the Austin Motor Company of Birmingham making the armored body.

In 1929, the entire Peerless range was redesigned to compete with other vehicles produced by Stutz and Marmon. This move saw increased sales, and for 1930 another design refresh was undertaken. The Peerless-designed V8 was replaced by a Continental straight-8 as a cost-saving measure. However, the Great Depression that began in 1929 greatly reduced the sales of luxury automobiles. Peerless stripped down its production and attempted to market one line of vehicles to wealthy Americans who were not affected by the depression. In 1930–31, Peerless commissioned Murphy Body Works to design what the company envisioned as its 1933 model. The task was assigned to a young Frank Hershey, who produced a remarkably clean, elegant vehicle. A single V16-engined 1932 Peerless was finished in June 1932, the last Peerless ever produced.

Peerless remained an idle business until the end of Prohibition in 1933, allowing it to manufacture alcohol. Peerless then revamped its factory and gained a license to brew beer under the Carling Black Label and Red Cap ale brands from the Brewing Corporation of Canada.

Hershey's single prototype V-16 remained in the Peerless factory until the end of World War II, and is now owned by the Crawford Auto-Aviation Museum in Ohio.

The following Peerless vehicles are deemed "classic cars" by the Classic Car Club of America (CCCA): 1925 Series 67; 1926 – 1928 Series 69; 1929 Model Eight-125; 1930-1 Custom 8 and the 1932 Deluxe Custom 8.

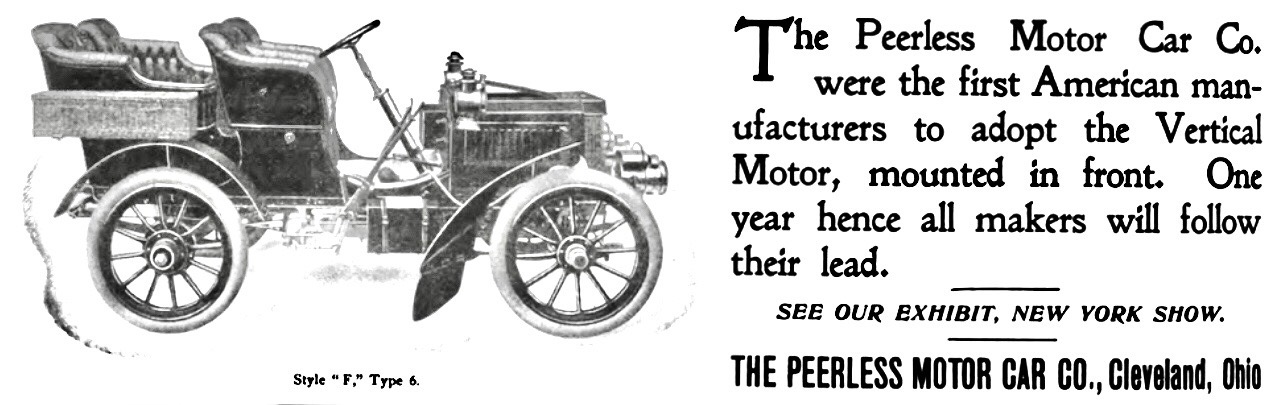
The Peerless Motor Car Co. was the first American manufacturers to adopt a front-mounted vertical motor

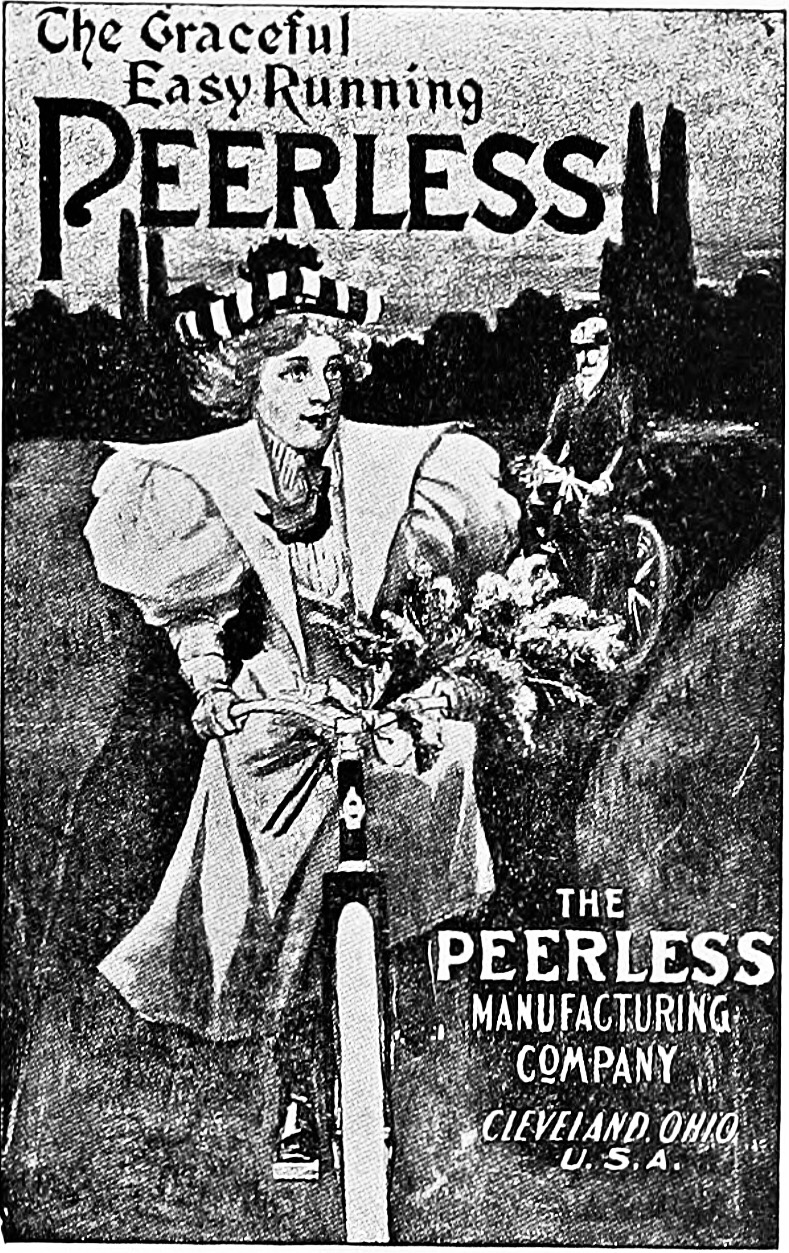
Peerless Bicycles (1897)

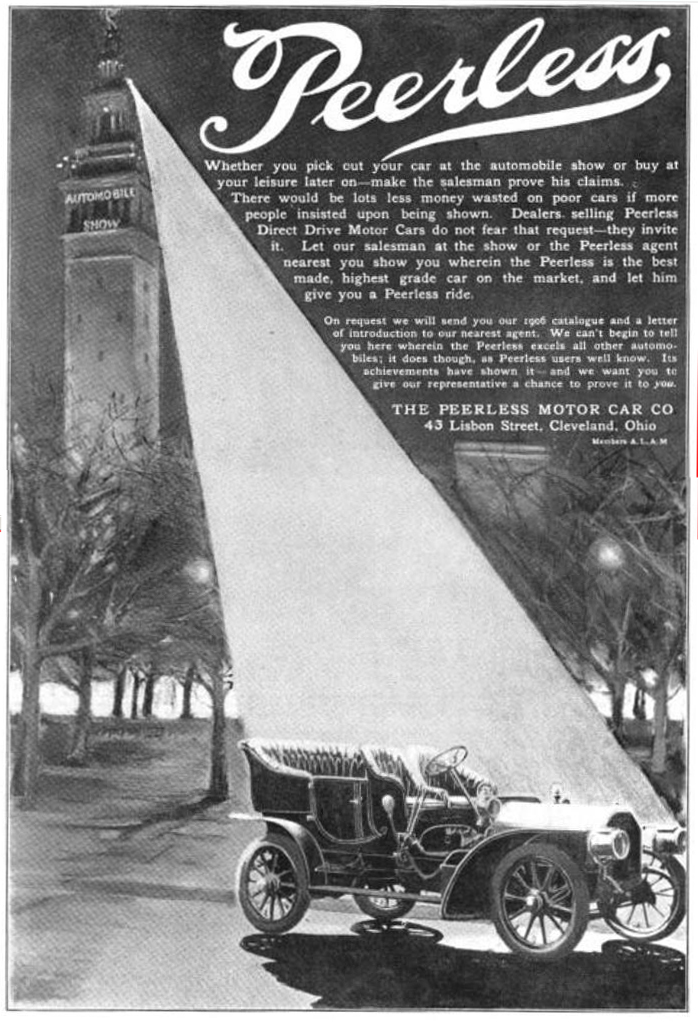
1905 Peerless advertisement

Peerless emblem

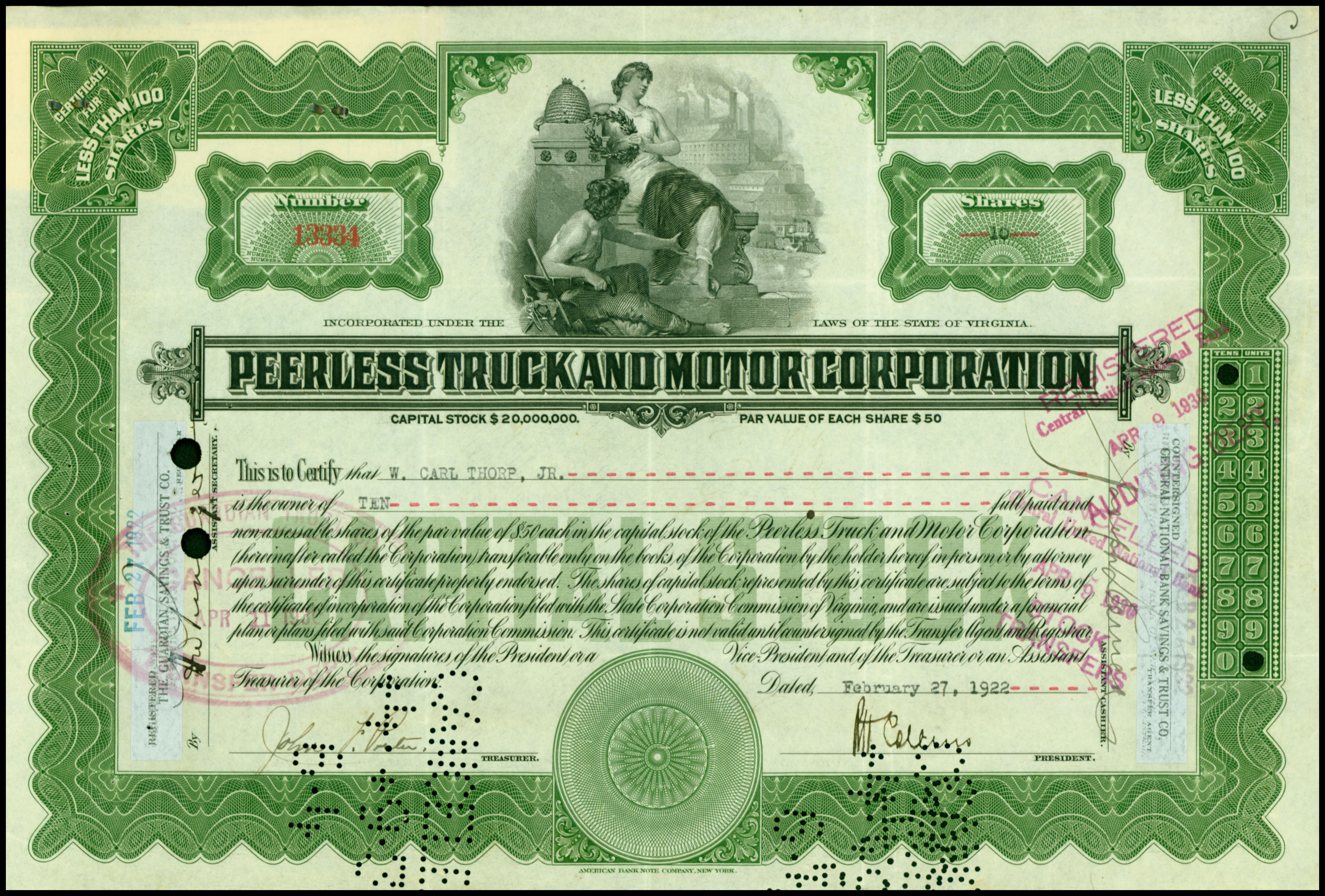
Share of the Peerless Truck and Motor Company, issued 27. February 1922

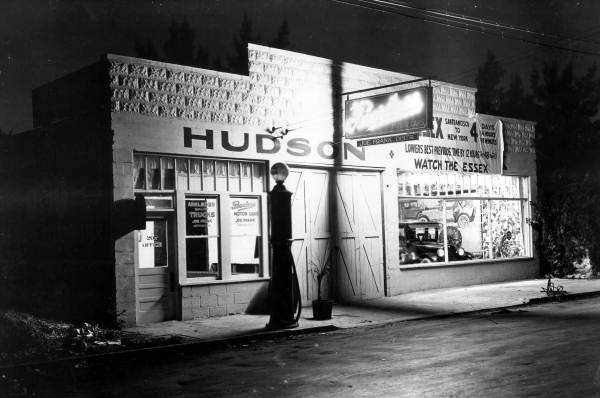
Peerless Dealer in Florida, circa 1926

== Production models ==
- Peerless Model 9
- Peerless Model 9 Limousine 5 Persons
- Peerless Model 9 Limousine 7 Persons
- Peerless Model 11
- Peerless Model 12
- Peerless Model 14
- Peerless Model 15
- Peerless Model 16
- Peerless Model 18
- Peerless Model 19
- Peerless Model 20
- Peerless Model 25
- Peerless Model 27
- Peerless Model 28
- Peerless Model 29
- Peerless Model 31
- Peerless Model 32
- Peerless Model 6-80
- Peerless TC4
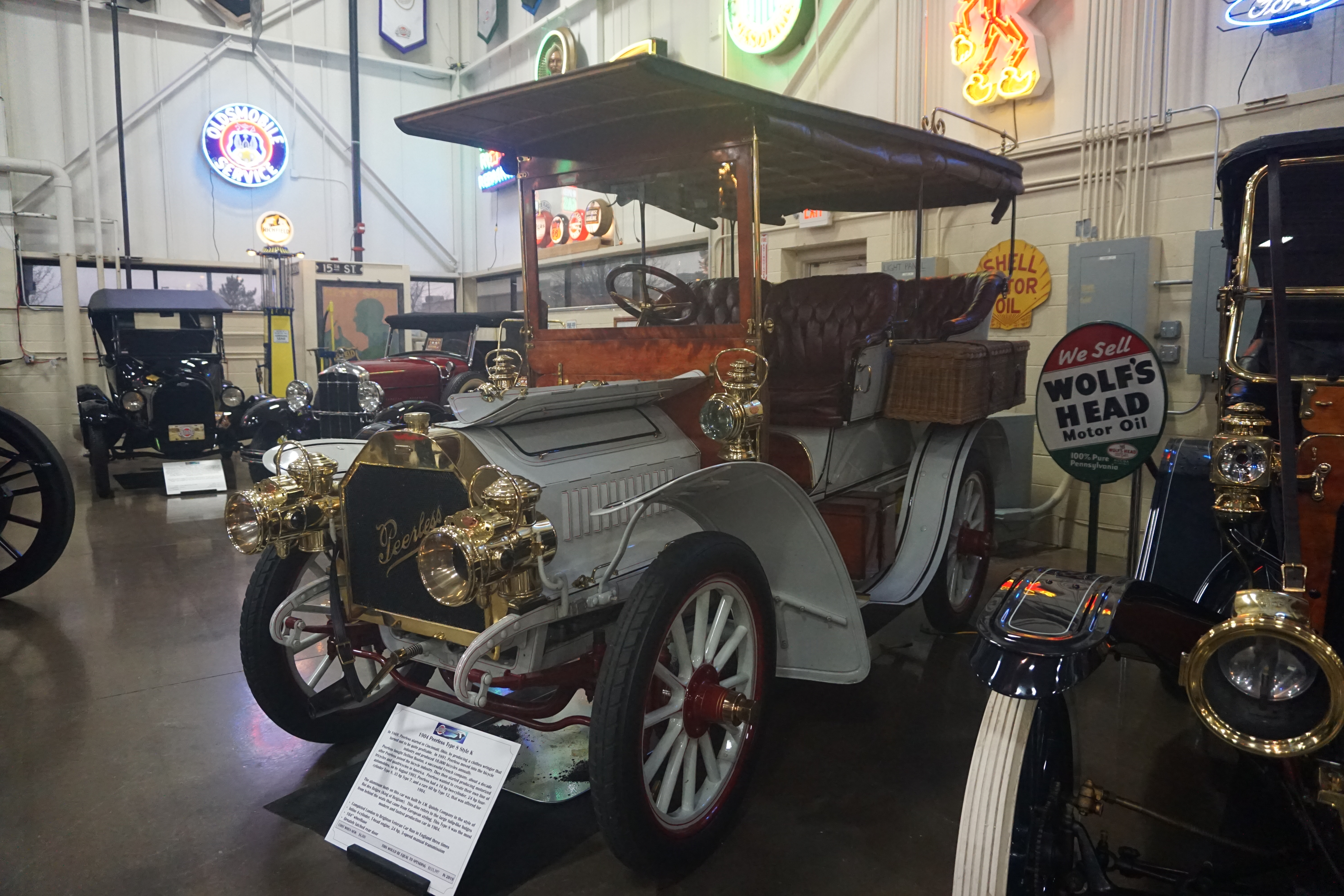
1904 Peerless Type 8 Style K

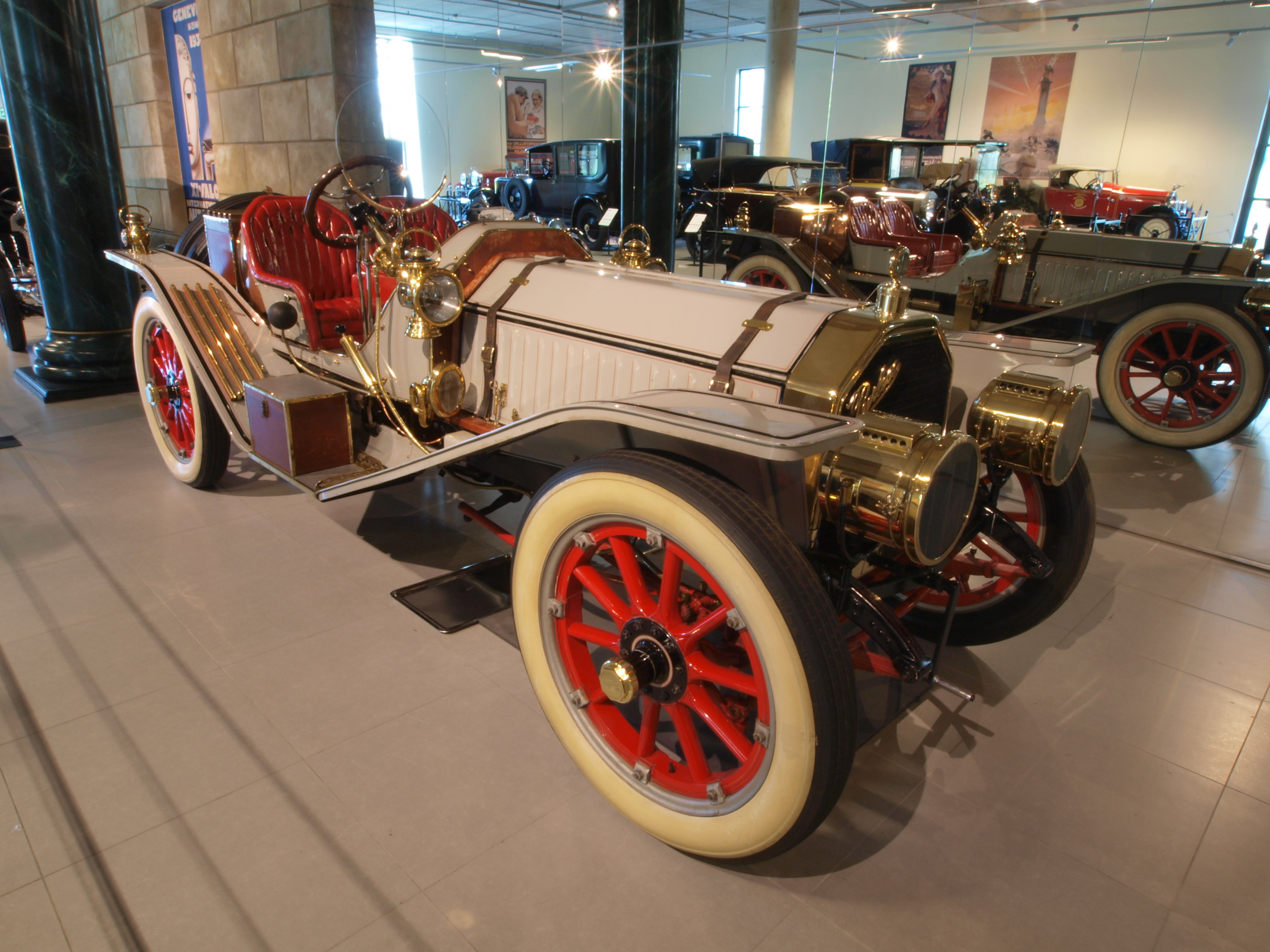
1911 Peerless Six Model 32 Roadster

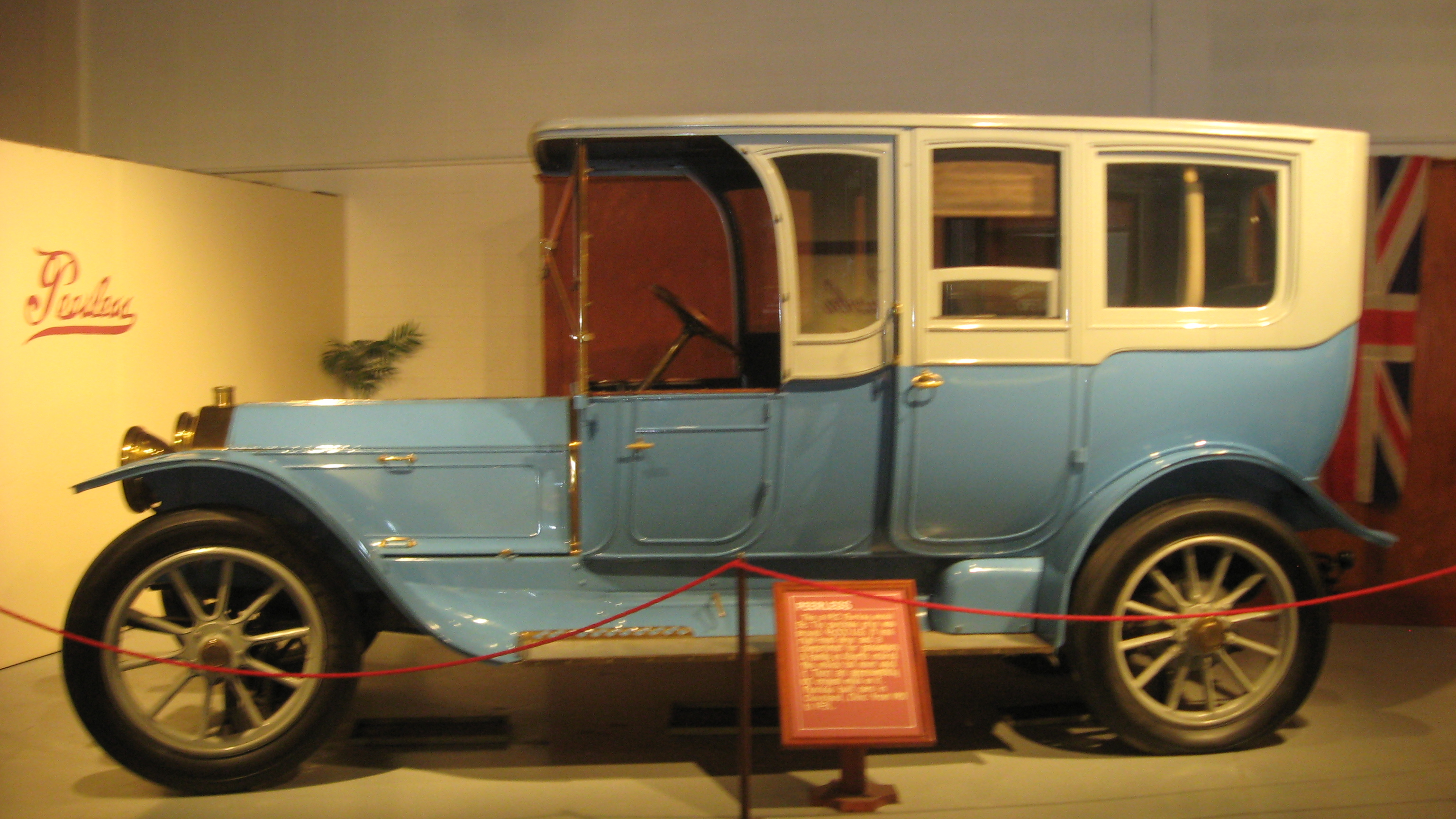
1912 Peerless Six Model 38 Berline Limousine with right-hand drive

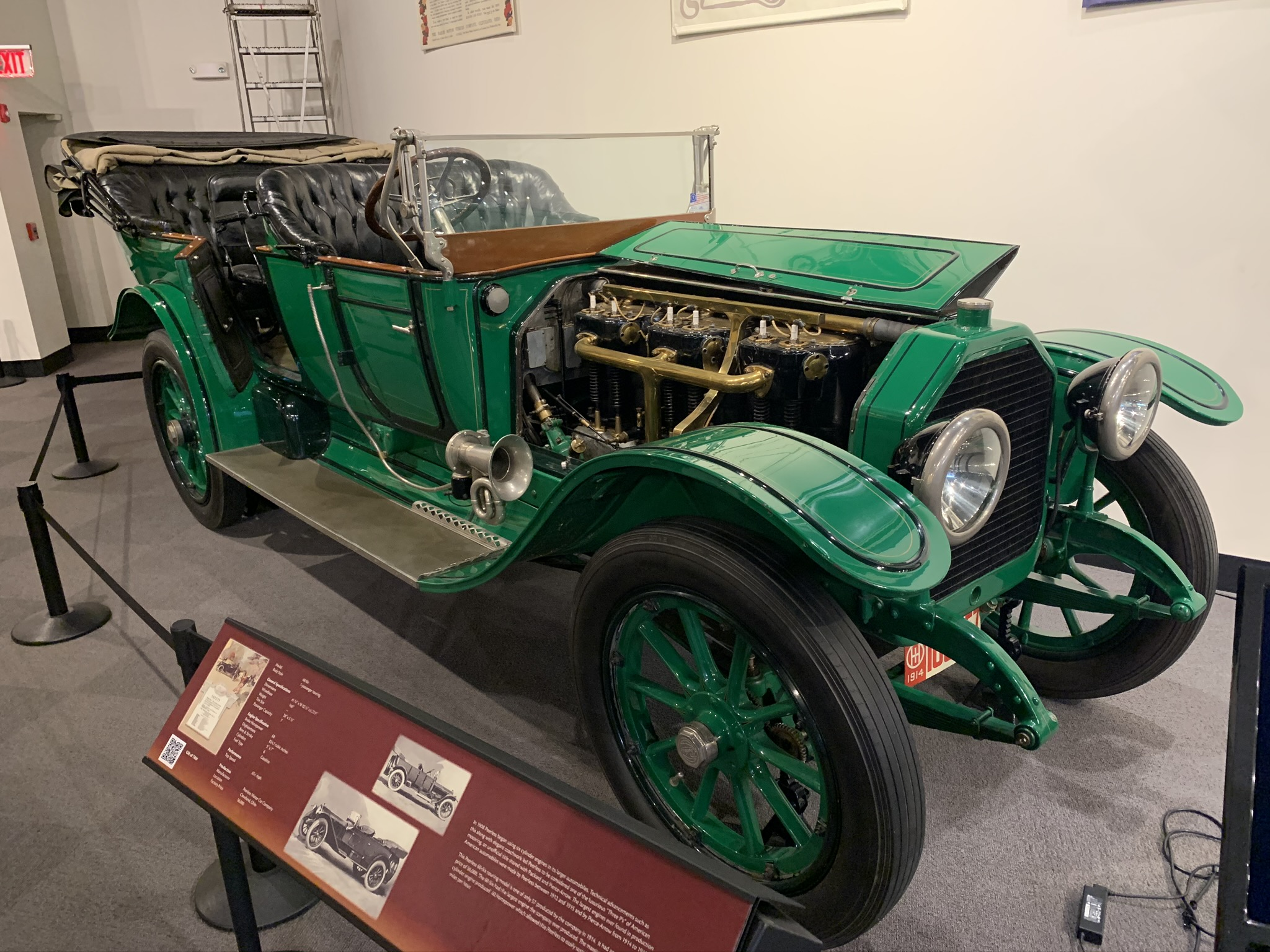
1914 Peerless Six Model 60 7-Passenger Touring Sedan

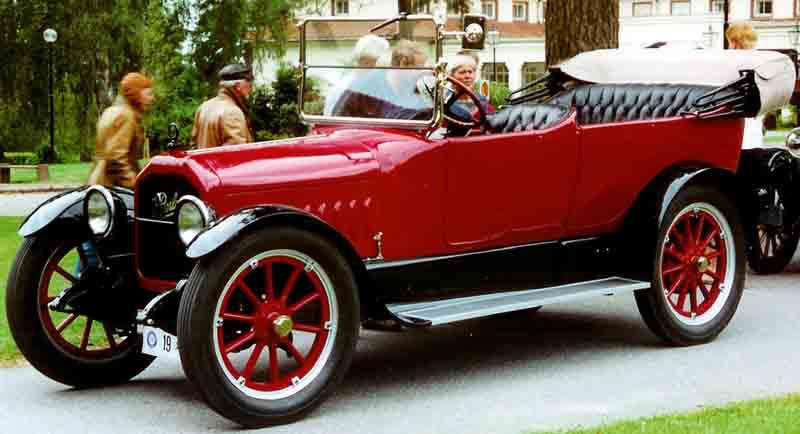
1917 Peerless Eight Model 56 7-Passenger Touring Sedan

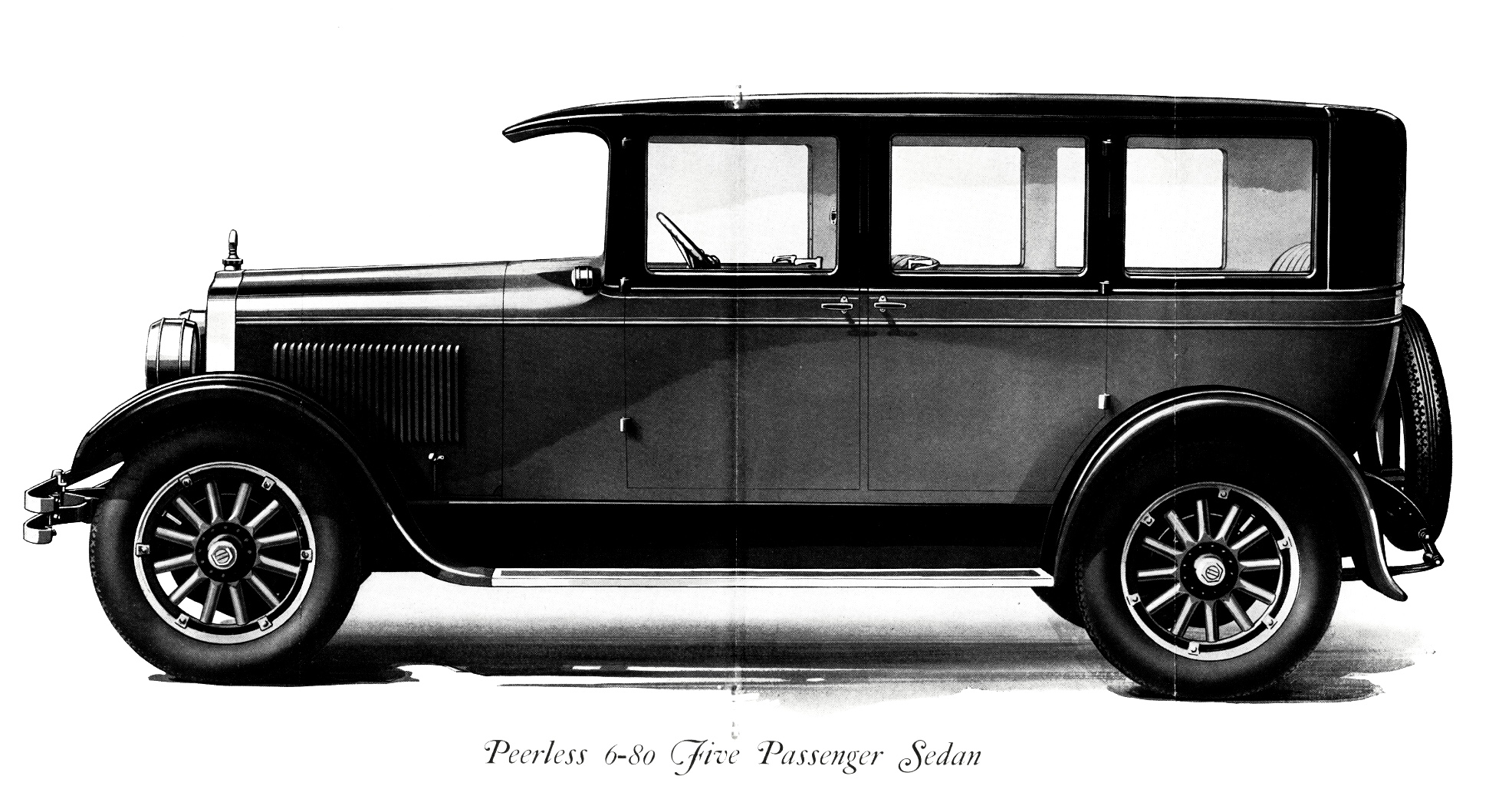
Peerless Model 6-80 (1926–1928)

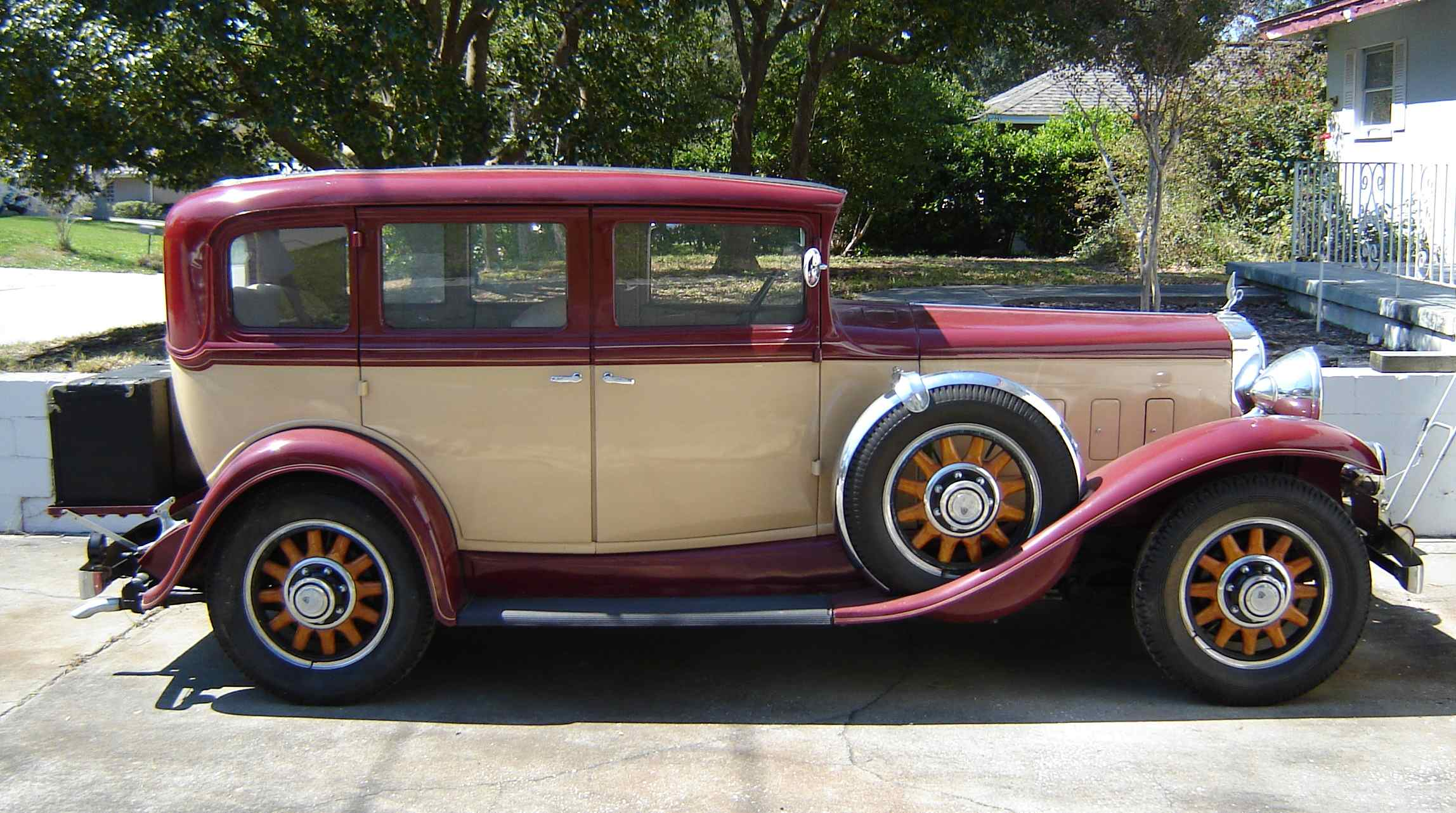
1931 Peerless Master Eight Sedan

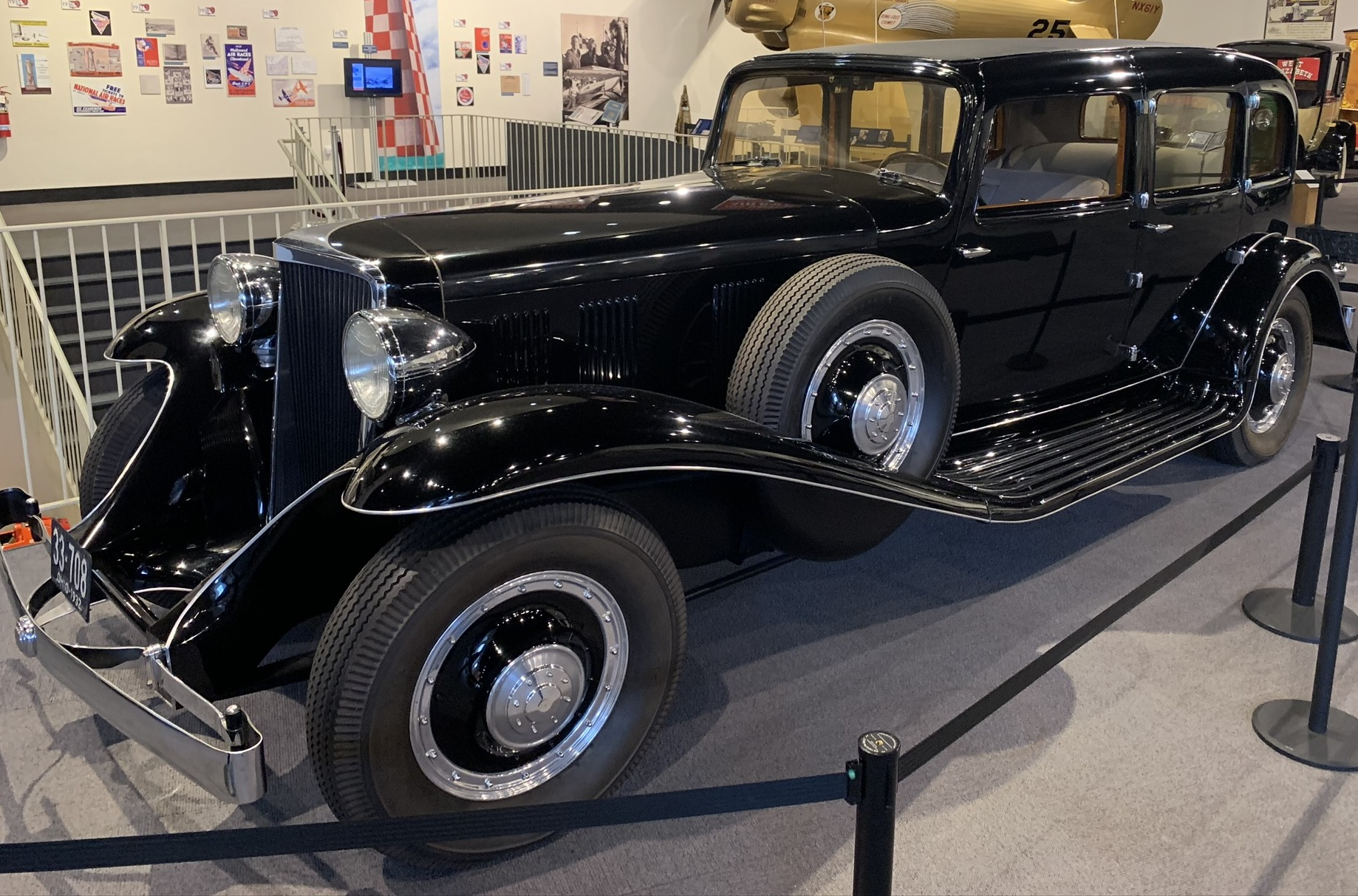
1931 Peerless V-16 Prototype (one manufactured)

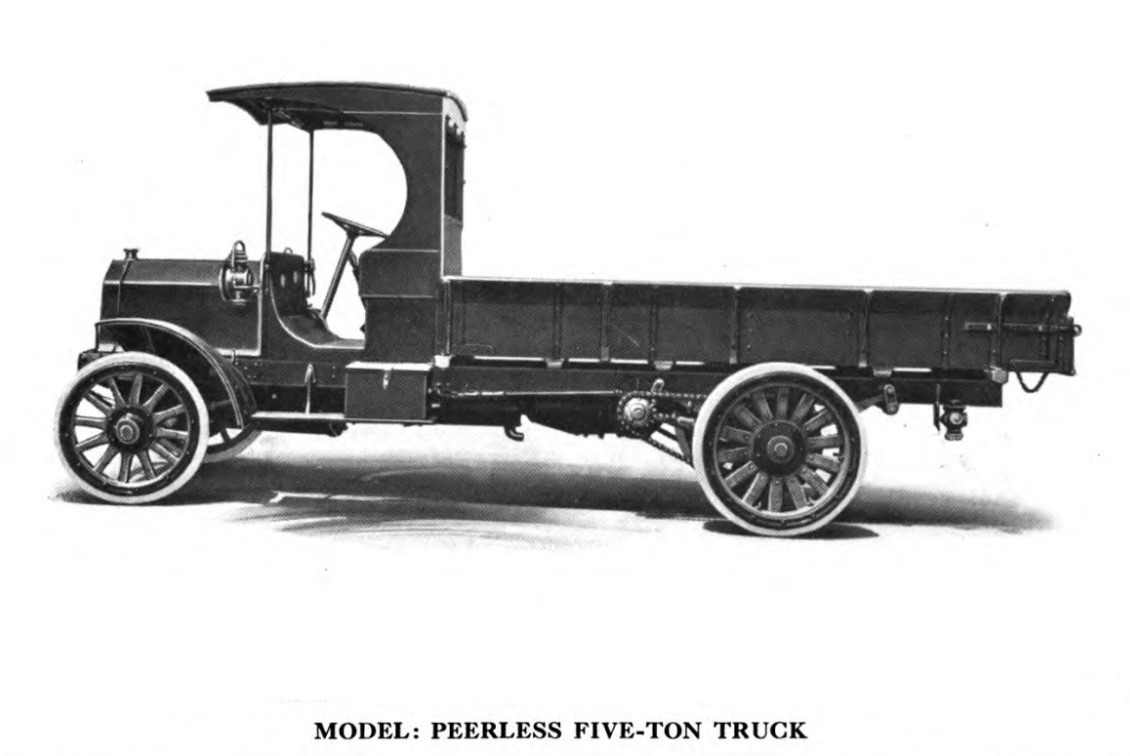
Peerless TC-5 (1911-1918)

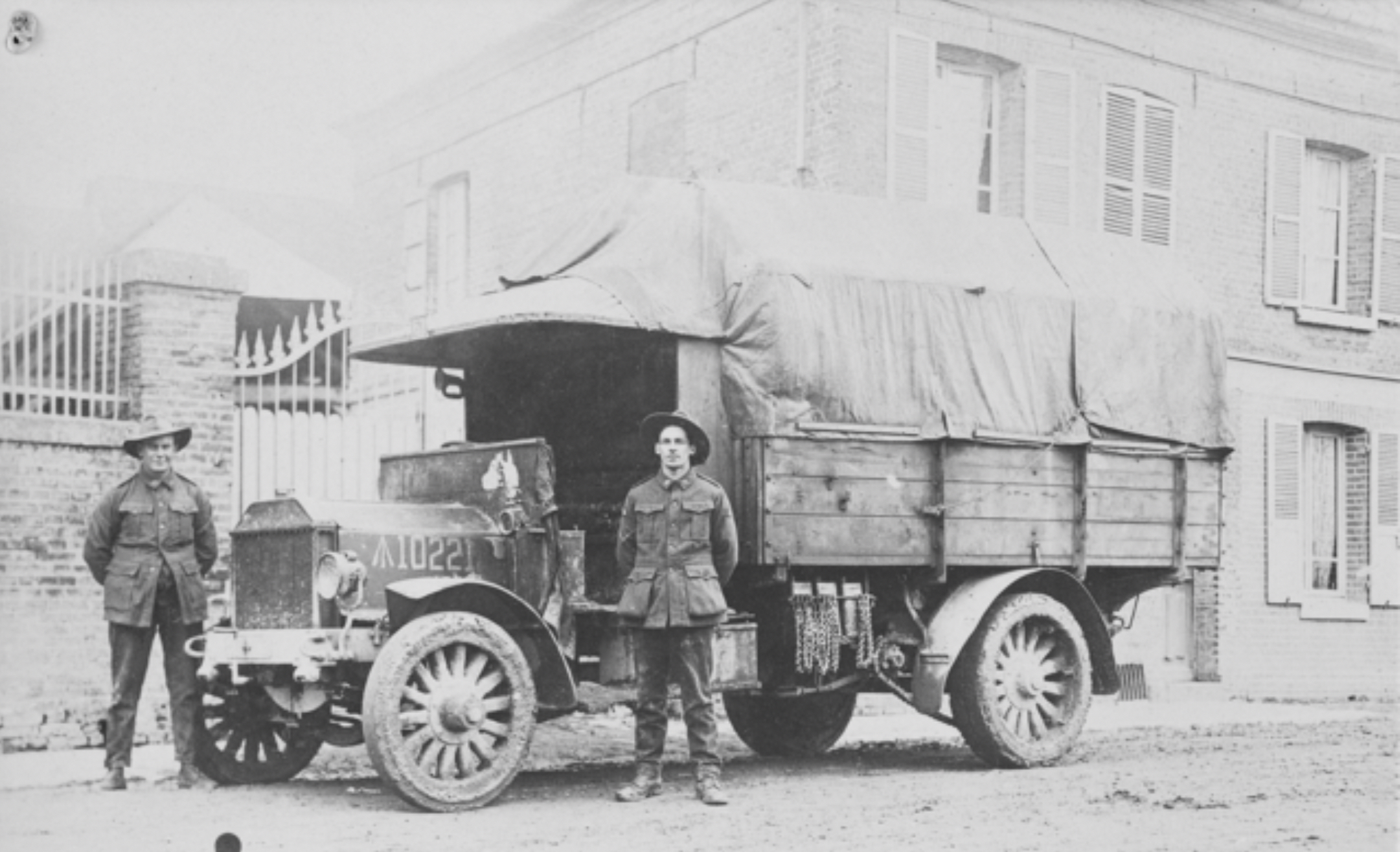
Peerless TC4 (from 1911)
