= V16 engine =

Type of engine

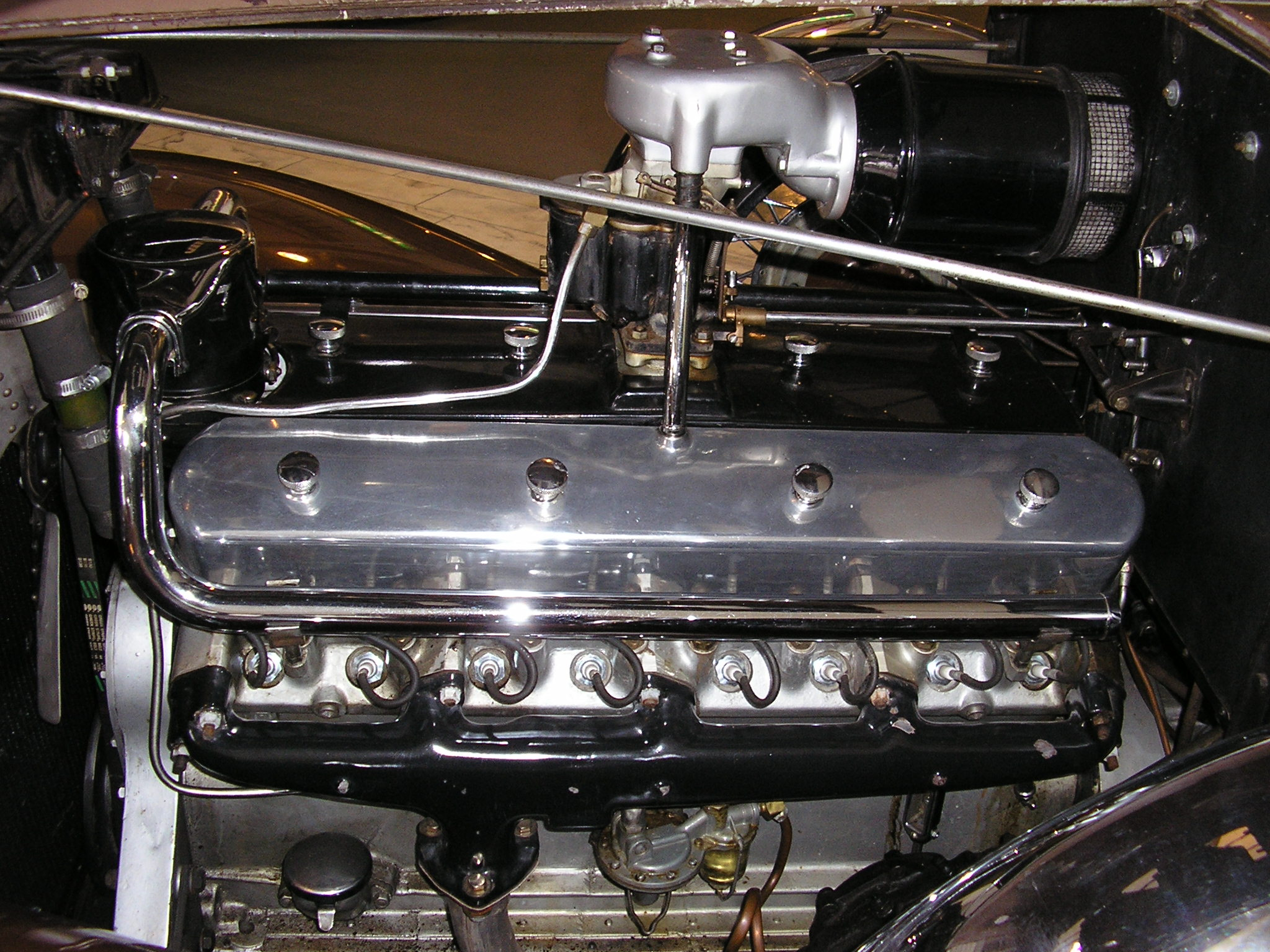
1933 Marmon Sixteen V16 engine.

A V16 engine is a sixteen-cylinder piston engine where two banks of eight cylinders are arranged in a V configuration around a common crankshaft. V16 engines are less common than engines with fewer cylinders, such as V8 and V12 engines. Each bank of a V16 engine can be thought of as a straight-eight, a design that can be inherently balanced. Most V16 engines have a 45° bank angle.

The first use of a V16 engine was in the 1910 Antoinette VII experimental aircraft, followed by several cars in the 1930s. Today, the most common applications for V16 engines are railroad locomotives, marine craft, and stationary power generators.

== Automotive applications ==
=== Production cars ===
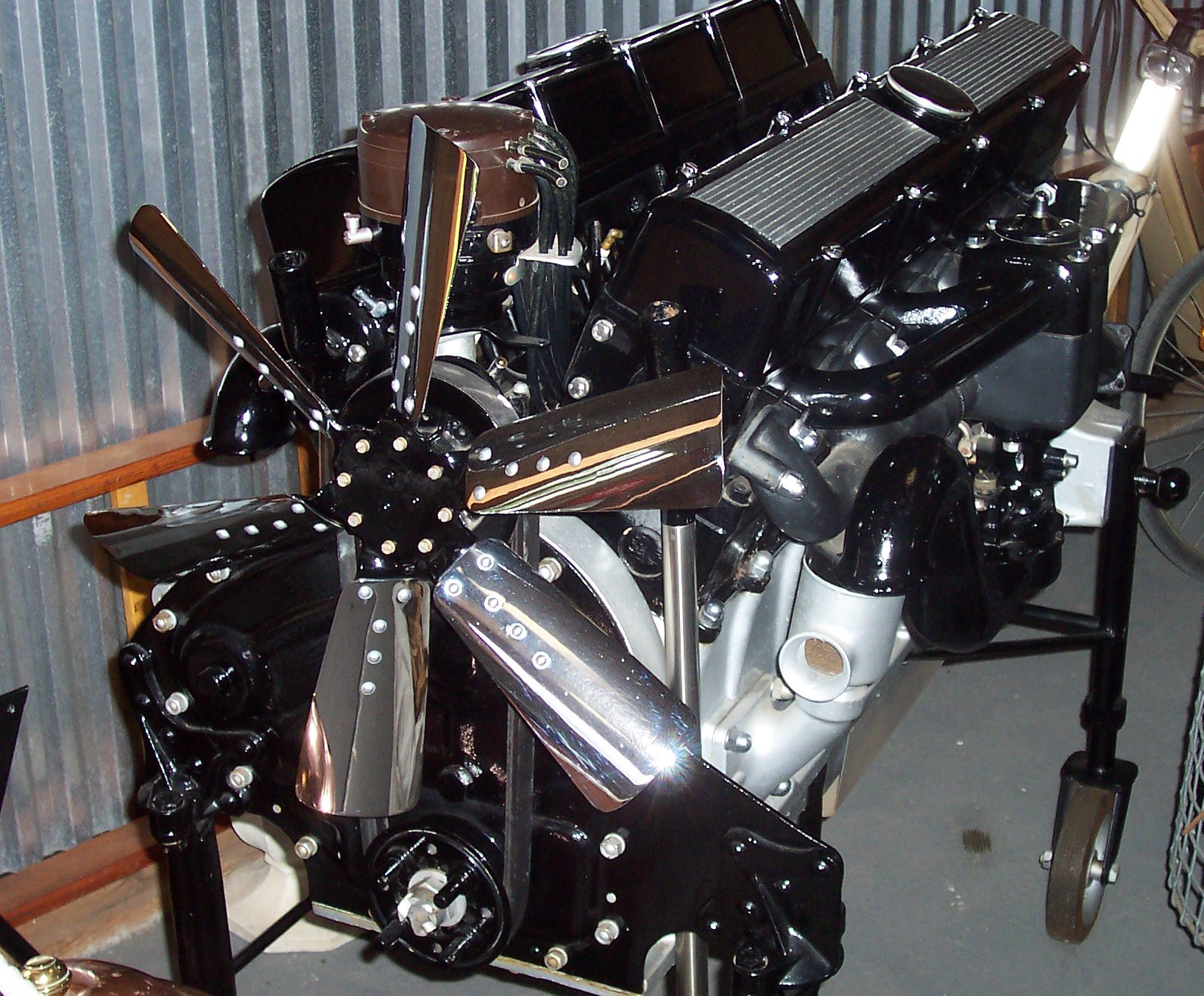
Early 1930s Cadillac V16 engine

The first production car to use a V16 engine was the Cadillac V-16, introduced in January 1930. The Cadillac V16 engine was initially produced with a displacement of 452 cu in (7.4 L), OHV and a V-angle of 45 degrees. For the 1938 Series 90, the engine was revised to a displacement of 431 cu in (7,062.8 cm^{3}), a flathead valvetrain and a V-angle of 135 degrees (the latter in order to achieve a lower cowl height). This 431 cu. in. version produced as much power as its immediate predecessor while being far less complex, had a stiffer crankshaft that aided durability and smoothness, and even had an external oil filter, a rarity for any car at any price in those days.

The Marmon Motor Car Company actually began development of a V16 engine in 1927 (earlier than Cadillac). Its development program took longer, however, and the Marmon Sixteen was released in 1931. This engine had a V-angle of 45 degrees, used pressed steel cylinder liners and was constructed mostly of aluminum. Only 400 Marmon Sixteens were produced between 1931 and 1933.

In 1991, the Cizeta-Moroder V16T began production, featuring a 16-cylinder engine in a unique configuration. Rather than a conventional V16 layout, the engine was actually two separate sets of transversely mounted V8 cylinders in a single block with gearing between the two sets providing a single output from the center of the engine to the transmission. It's believed that only between 9 to 11 cars were produced before the company ceased operations.

In June 2024, Bugatti unveiled the Tourbillon, the successor to the Chiron, marking a modern revival of the V16 configuration. The Tourbillon features an 8.3L (506 cu in) naturally aspirated V16 engine co-developed with Cosworth. Weighing 252 kg (556 lb) in total–lighter than the naturally aspirated Aston Martin 6.0- litre V12–the engine incorporates titanium connecting rods and a carbon fibre inlet plenum to minimize weight. Paired with three electric motors, the hybrid system delivers a combined 1,800 PS (1,324 kW; 1,775 hp), which Bugatti claims enables the car to accelerate from 0 to 100 km/h (62 mph) in under 2.0 seconds.

=== Prototype cars ===
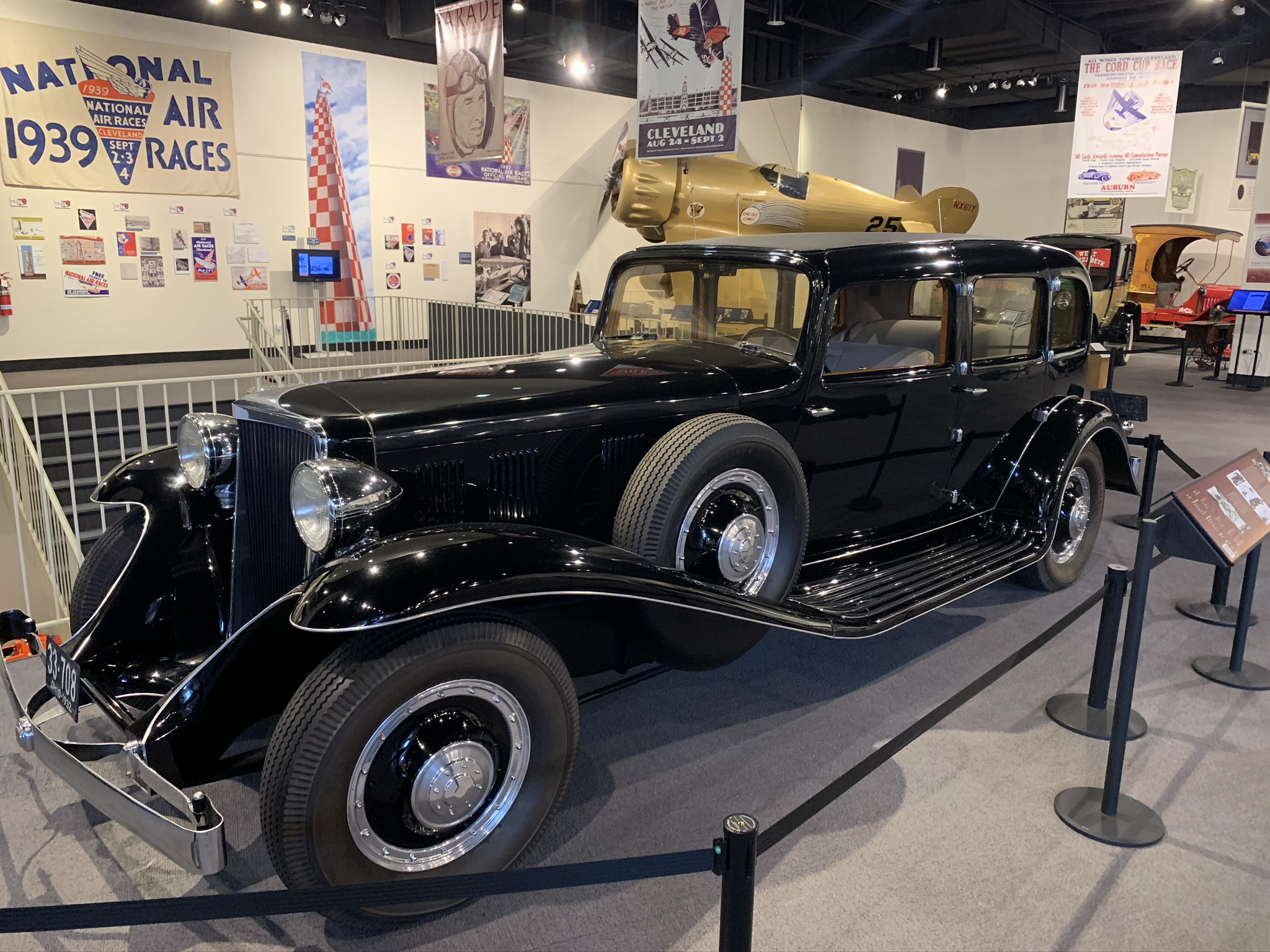
1932 Peerless Sixteen prototype

The Peerless Motor Company developed a V16 engine in the early 1930s, yet just a single prototype was built before all automobile production ceased and the company converted its factory into a brewery following the end of Prohibition in the United States.

In the late 1980s, the BMW Goldfish V16 6.7 L (409 cu in) engine was developed, based on BMW's then-new V12 engine. Prototypes were fitted to a long-wheelbase 7 Series and then in the early 1990s to a Bentley Mulsanne.

The 2003 Cadillac Sixteen concept car was unveiled with a 13.6 L (830 cu in) V16 engine, which was based on the General Motors LS V8 engines. The following year, the Rolls-Royce 100EX concept car was unveiled with a 9.0 L (549 cu in) V16 engine. The car featured in the film Johnny English Reborn is powered by this V16 engine.

The 2017 Devel Sixteen Prototype used a quad-turbo 12.3 L (751 cu in) V16 engine.

=== Racing cars ===
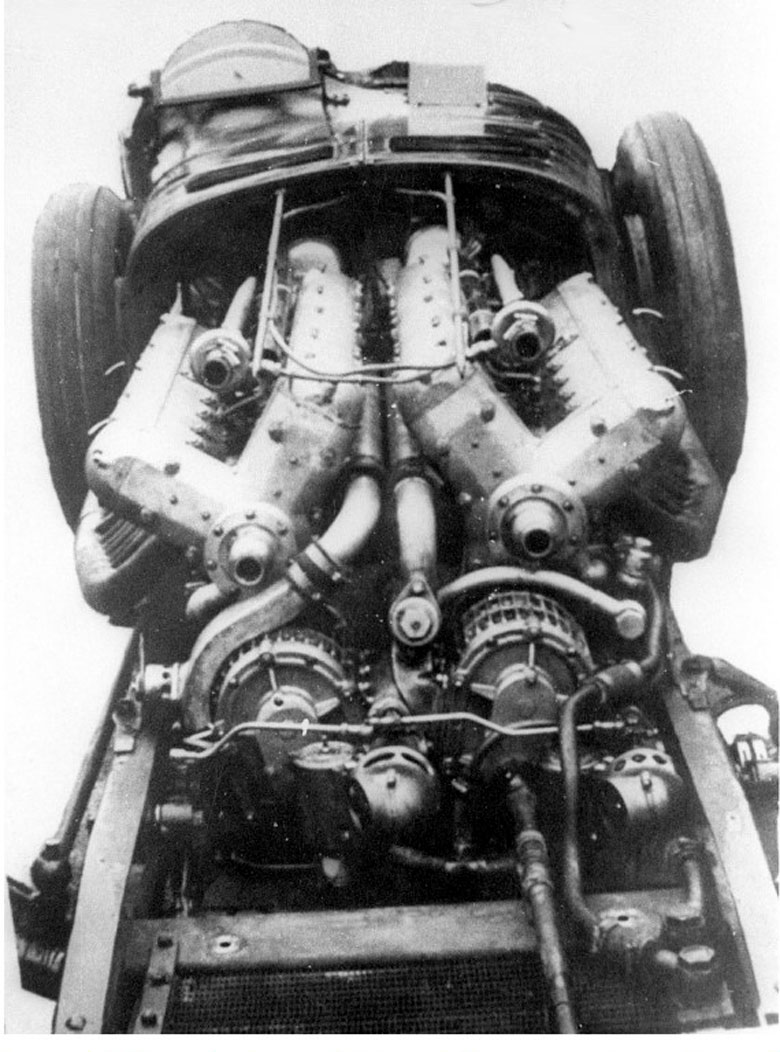
A 22.5-degree Maserati V4 16-cylinder engine

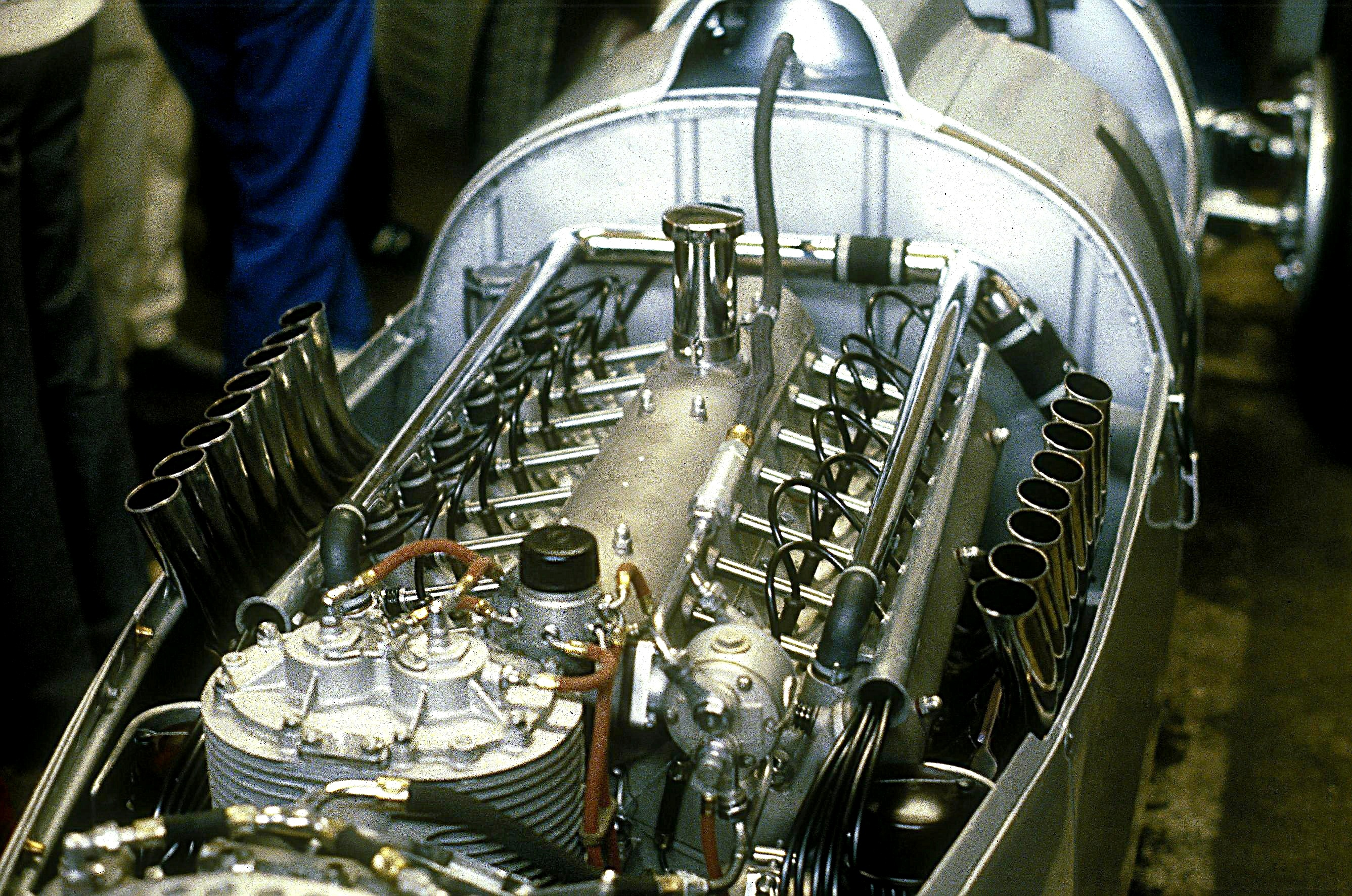
Auto Union Type C engine

1934 Auto Union Type A
Auto Union Type A

The first known use of a V16 in motor racing was the Maserati Tipo V4 car used in Grand Prix racing. The Tipo V4 debuted at Monza in 1929 and achieved a world speed record of 245.9 km/h (152.8 mph) at an event in Cremona, Italy.

1931 Miller V16 Racing Car is powered by the only V16 automotive engine Harry Miller ever built. The revolutionary 300-horsepower, 45-degree V16 Miller engine was originally destined for a super-fast Cord. At the 1931 Indianapolis 500, a custom-built V16 engine was fitted to a Cord "supercar" driven by Shorty Cantlon. The car was competitive, charging from 26th on the grid to 3rd, but was slowed by unreliability, further exacerbated by having to change all sixteen spark plugs. The following year, Bryan Saulpaugh qualified the car in third position. The car suffered a broken oil line on lap 55 and their race was over. Shortly after the race the V16 was removed and replaced with a conventional Miller four-cylinder engine.

The mid-engined Auto Union Type A, Type B and Type C Grand Prix cars of 1933 to 1938 were powered by supercharged 4.4 L (269 cu in) V16 engines. Due to a rule change in 1938, these were replaced by a V12 engine for the Type D racing car. Prior to this rule change, the Alfa Romeo Tipo 316 competed at the 1938 Tripoli Grand Prix powered by a 60-degree V16 engine, and in 1939 an unusual 135-degree V16 engine was installed in the Alfa Romeo Tipo 162.

The only known use of a V16 engine in the post-World War II era is the British Racing Motors (BRM) V16 engine used in Formula One racing from 1950 to 1955. The engine was a 1.5 L (91 cu in) supercharged design, which was unsuccessful despite its high power output. Officially, it produced 410 kW (550 hp) but probably delivered around 450 kW (600 hp). The car was difficult to drive, due to the power band being in a narrow range and at high RPM.

== Marine / rail applications ==
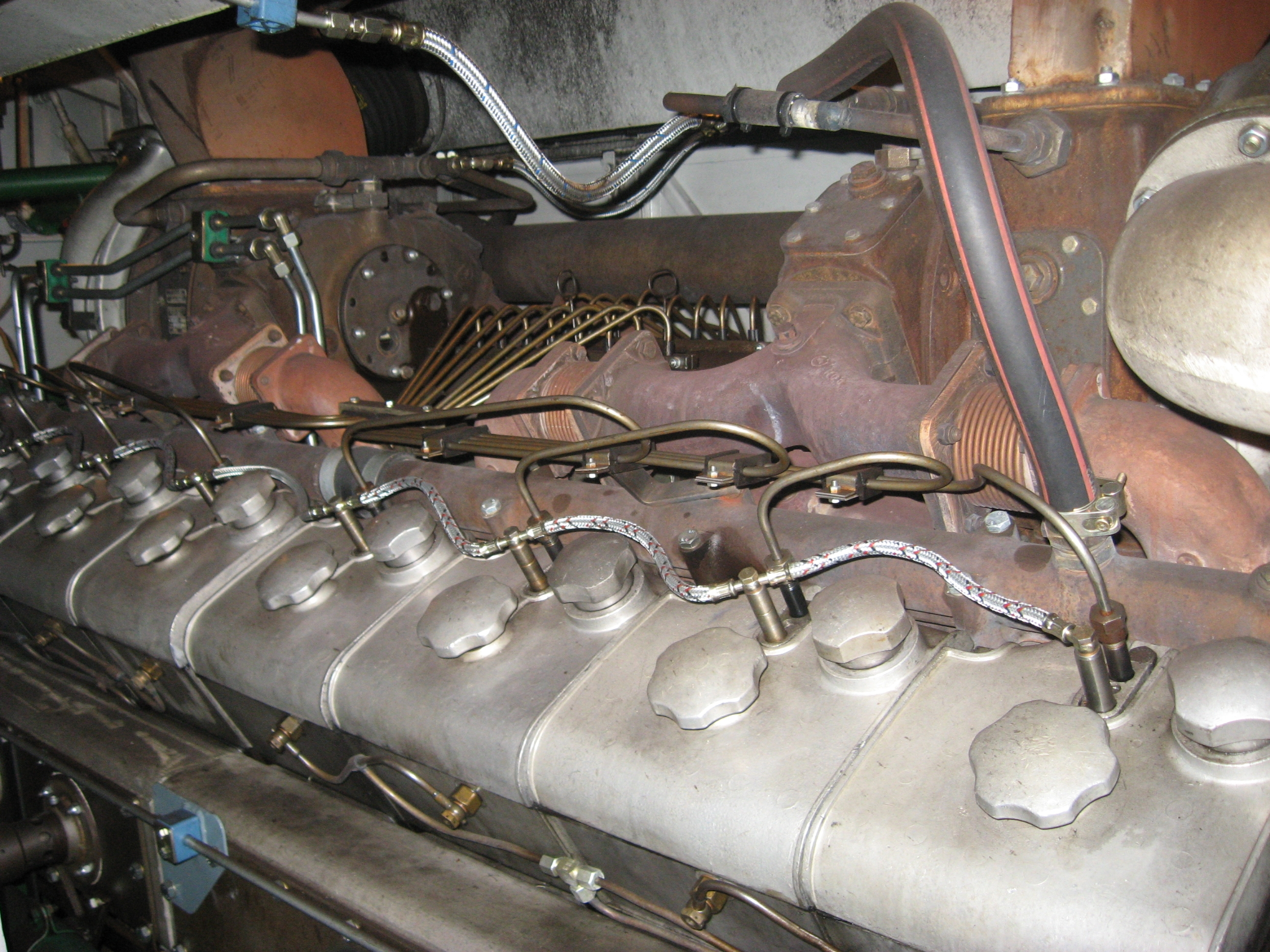
Tampella MGO engine in a VR Class Dv12 locomotive

The V16 configuration is also used in several large displacement diesel engines that are used as marine engines or in rail locomotives. This is due to manufacturers often designing an engine around a fixed displacement per cylinder, then adding additional cylinders to the design until the required power output is achieved. For example, the Electro-Motive Diesel 710 engine range uses a displacement of 710 cu in (11.6 L) per cylinder, with the 16 cylinder version (called the EMD 16-710) producing over 4,300 hp (3.2 MW).

GE Transportation produces the 7FD Series four-stroke engines (used in marine, locomotive, and stationary applications), which have a displacement of 668 cu in (10.9 L) per cylinder and can produce over 4,400 hp (3.3 MW). GE also manufactures the GEVO-16, which produces over 6,000 hp (4.47 MW).

Another V16 diesel engine is the Wärtsilä 46F, which produces over 25,700 hp (19.2 MW) at 600 rpm.

In the UK from 1947 onwards, English Electric's subsidiary English Electric diesel engines developed a V16 engine for rail and marine use based on its 10" bore x 12" stroke (254mm x 305mm) K series from the 1930s, notably used in British Railways class 40 and 50 locomotives with power output in the range 2000-3000 hp (1492-2238 kW) at speeds ranging from 600 to 900 rpm. This engine too derives from a series based on a fixed cylinder size of 942 cu.in. (15.4 L) per cylinder, giving the V16 a total capacity of 15,072 cu.in. (246 L).

Another notable maker to offer the V16 configuration was Detroit Diesel corporation, especially in their 71, 92 and 149 series 2-stroke diesel engines, with output ranging from around 650 to over 2400 bhp (485-1790 kW) at speeds over 2000 rpm in the smaller ranges. Once again these engines were based on common parts (the numeric designation is the cylinder size in cubic inches) and were used for maritime, generator and off-road mine truck applications. The modular nature of the engines meant that the V16 configuration was built by putting together two V8 engine blocks and the 2-stroke cycle offered excellent power to weight, with the 16V149 being capable of equalling the output of much larger, slower-running 4-stroke engines.

Fairbanks Morse manufactures the following V16 diesel engines, FM | ALCO 251F, FM | COLT-PIELSTICK PA6B STC, FM | COLT-PIELSTICK PC2.5 STC, FM | MAN 28/33D STC, FM | MAN 32/44CR, FM | MAN 48/60 CR and the FM | MAN 175D.

== Aircraft applications ==
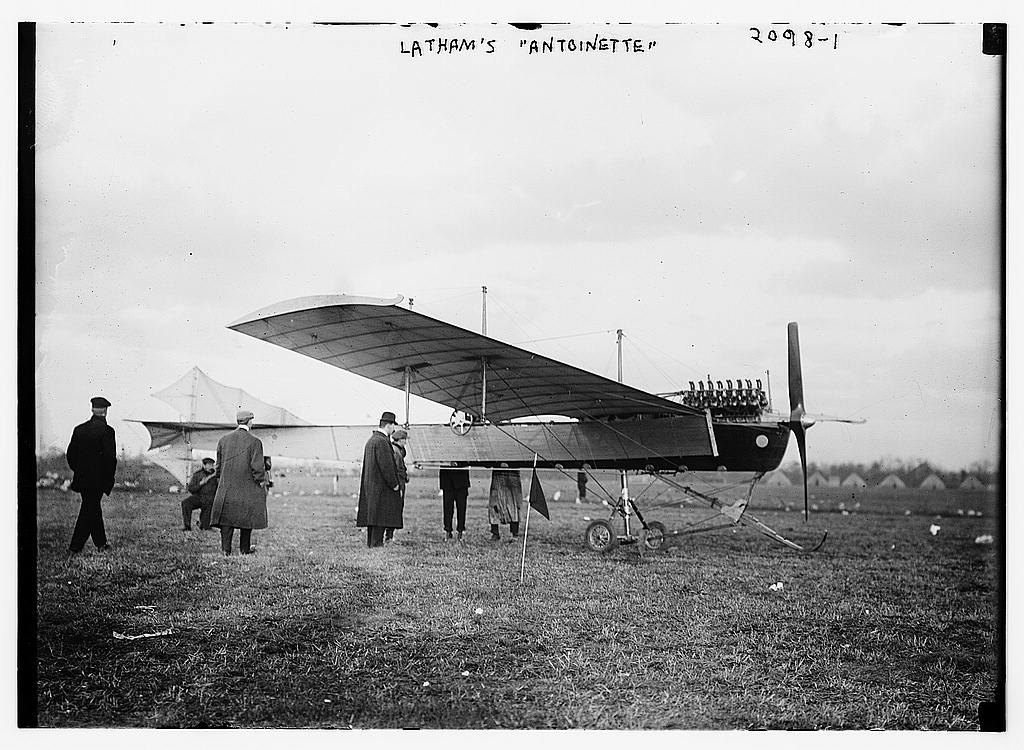
Antoinette VII experimental aircraft

The 1910 version of the Antoinette VII was powered by a V16 engine and competed in the 1910 Gordon Bennett Cup in the United States.

The 1930s Hindenburg airships were each powered by four Daimler-Benz DB 602 V16 diesel engines.

In the first half of the 20th century, several prototype aircraft used V16 engines, including:

- 1907 prototype designed by Antoinette engineer Léon Levavasseur.
- Duesenberg developed a V-16 H Direct Engine for use in military aircraft in the mid 1910s. World War I ended prior to the engine being tested in an aircraft.
- The Chrysler IV-2220 inverted V16 engine began development in 1939, when Chrysler was contracted by the United States government to create a new engine for use in fighter aircraft. The resulting engine was rated at 2,500 hp (1,900 kW),, however it took until June 1945 for the engine to be in a state ready for testing. A prototype engine was installed in a P-47 Thunderbolt (designated the XP-47H), which achieved a top speed of 504 mph (811 km/h). World War II ended shortly after the tests, therefore development of the engine ceased.

== See also ==
- Flat-sixteen engine
- W16 engine
