= 1934 24 Hours of Le Mans =

12th 24 Hours of Le Mans endurance race

Previous: 1933	Next: 1935
Index: Races | Winners

The 1934 24 Hours of Le Mans was the 12th Grand Prix of Endurance. It took place at the Circuit de la Sarthe on 16 and 17 June 1934. Four privateer Alfa Romeo entries were expected to fight for outright honours, with an outside chance for the four Bugattis ranged against them. British cars dominated the smaller classes. Two-time winner Raymond Sommer soon took the lead until, after only 90 minutes, he stopped out on the circuit with smoke pouring from his engine. For the next five hours the Alfas of Luigi Chinetti and Earl Howe duelled for the lead. However, soon after night fell, the lights failed on Howe's Alfa costing him two hours to get the electrics repaired. Chinetti took the lead, but their car had developed a leak in the fuel tank. The solution was the same as Sommer had used the previous year: to plug the gap with chewing-gum.

By the halfway point, there was only a single competitive big-engine car left running, and interest shifted to the race for the Index of Performance between the four British firms of Aston Martin, MG, Riley and Singer. For a time, with race attrition, the 1.1-litre MG of John Ford was running second overall, until a three-car pile-up at Maison Blanche took it out of the race. The Aston Martin challenge collapsed in a disastrous two laps that saw three of their works cars retire. This left the Riley works team to finish second, third, fifth and sixth and claim both the Index of Performance and Biennial Cup.

Chinetti and Étancelin held on to win comfortably overall, with the second-biggest winning margin to date, of 180 km (110 mi), albeit the shortest overall winning distance of the decade.

== Regulations and Organisation ==
The renovation of the circuit and facilities by the Automobile Club de l'Ouest (ACO) were completed. A completely new pit complex was built. Made of concrete with capacity for 60 cars, it was separated from the pit lane and racing track by a wooden picket fence. Pit counters were provided with a second storey for trade stands and guests. Eco and Jupiter, the French distributors of Esso and Shell fuel respectively, pay for each pit-box to be installed with a 1000-litre tank, gantry and hoses to allow refuelling direct to the cars. This was regulated to be at 120 litres/minute. Race control was also housed in the new pit complex, alongside new viewing balconies above the pits. However, the £25 entry fee dissuaded many of the small teams from availing themselves of them. A large restaurant opened beside the main grandstand. All the spectator areas now had access to drinking water, and had an earthen bank and fencing put between them and the circuit. Additionally, a 25-hectare golf-course built inside the circuit. Reflecting the greater commercialism of the event, the two main camping areas were regulated and numbered to allow charging spectators who wanted to camp overnight. Loudspeakers were placed every 100 metres along the new stretch of the circuit between the pits and Tertre Rouge, where very large crowds now gathered. Regarding the track itself, after Odette Siko's accident the year before, the straights between the Mulsanne and Arnage were resurfaced and trees along the roadside were felled. It was also notable the increasing proliferation of advertising banners along the circuit. A common trend of the time was for big sporting events to have an associated song with a song with a catchy tune. This year, one was unveiled for the race. Composed by Le Mans music lecturer Émile Baudrier, it was called ACO: Marche Officielle des 24 Heures du Mans with lyrics by Parisian actor Lucien Cazalis, and proved very popular.

In the years of alternating fuel suppliers, this year Esso had four fuel choices: its regular fuel, a premium grade, 100% benzole and a 70/15/15 blend of the regular with benzole and ethanol. With the new fuel rigs, the ACO allowed a second mechanic to work on a car in the pits, nominated solely as the refueller. The minimum running distance between refuelling stops remained at 24 laps. The ACO made significant increases to the class distance-targets, this time in the mid-range engines, with an extra 125 km added to the minimum distance for 3-litre cars for example. Three 8-hour practice sessions were scheduled on the Wednesday, Thursday and Friday nights between 10pm and 6am. Public traffic was also allowed onto the roads at the same time, but this year was only allowed to travel in the same direction as the racing cars.

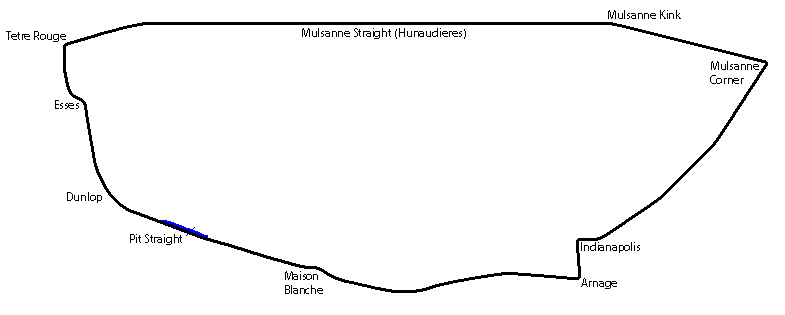
Le Mans in 1934

Engine size	1933 Minimum distance	1934 Minimum distance	Average speed	Equivalent laps
6000cc+	2,600 km (1,600 mi)	2,640 km (1,640 mi)	110.0 km/h (68.4 mph)	195.7 laps
5000cc	2,600 km (1,600 mi)	2,632 km (1,635 mi)	109.7 km/h (68.2 mph)	195.1 laps
4000cc	2,500 km (1,600 mi)	2,610 km (1,620 mi)	108.8 km/h (67.6 mph)	193.5 laps
3000cc	2,325 km (1,445 mi)	2,450 km (1,520 mi)	102.1 km/h (63.4 mph)	181.6 laps
2000cc	2,100 km (1,300 mi)	2,200 km (1,400 mi)	91.7 km/h (57.0 mph)	163.1 laps
1500cc	2,000 km (1,200 mi)	2,100 km (1,300 mi)	87.5 km/h (54.4 mph)	155.7 laps
1100cc	1,830 km (1,140 mi)	1,880 km (1,170 mi)	78.3 km/h (48.7 mph)	139.4 laps
750cc	1,580 km (980 mi)	1,700 km (1,100 mi)	70.8 km/h (44.0 mph)	126.0 laps

== Entries ==
Whether due to the ongoing economic recovery, the improved facilities or the thrilling 10-second margin of victory the previous year by superstar Tazio Nuvolari, the race received the largest number of entrants for ten years. Over half of those were from British marques. Out of the 52 applicants, 45 arrived on race-week for scrutineering with works entries received from the British Aston Martin, Riley and Singer companies and the small French manufacturer Tracta. Although British cars made up almost half the field, none were likely outright race winners. Those would probably come from the privateer Alfa Romeos or Bugattis.

From the thirteen finishers in the previous year’s race, twelve returned to contest the Biennial Cup, which therefore shaped up to be a significant competition. As grid-order and Index distance were based on engine size (unmodified for supercharging, for the grid position), and there were no prizes for class victory, the nominal class groupings were largely irrelevant.

Category	Entries	Classes
Large-sized engines	13 / 8	over 3-litre
Medium-sized engines	15 / 14	1.5 to 3-litre
Small-sized engines	24 / 22	up to 1.5-litre
Total entrants	52 / 44	

- Note: The first number is the number of entries, the second the number who started. Using the equivalent engine-size with supercharged engines having the x1.4 conversion factor

=== Over 2-litre entries ===
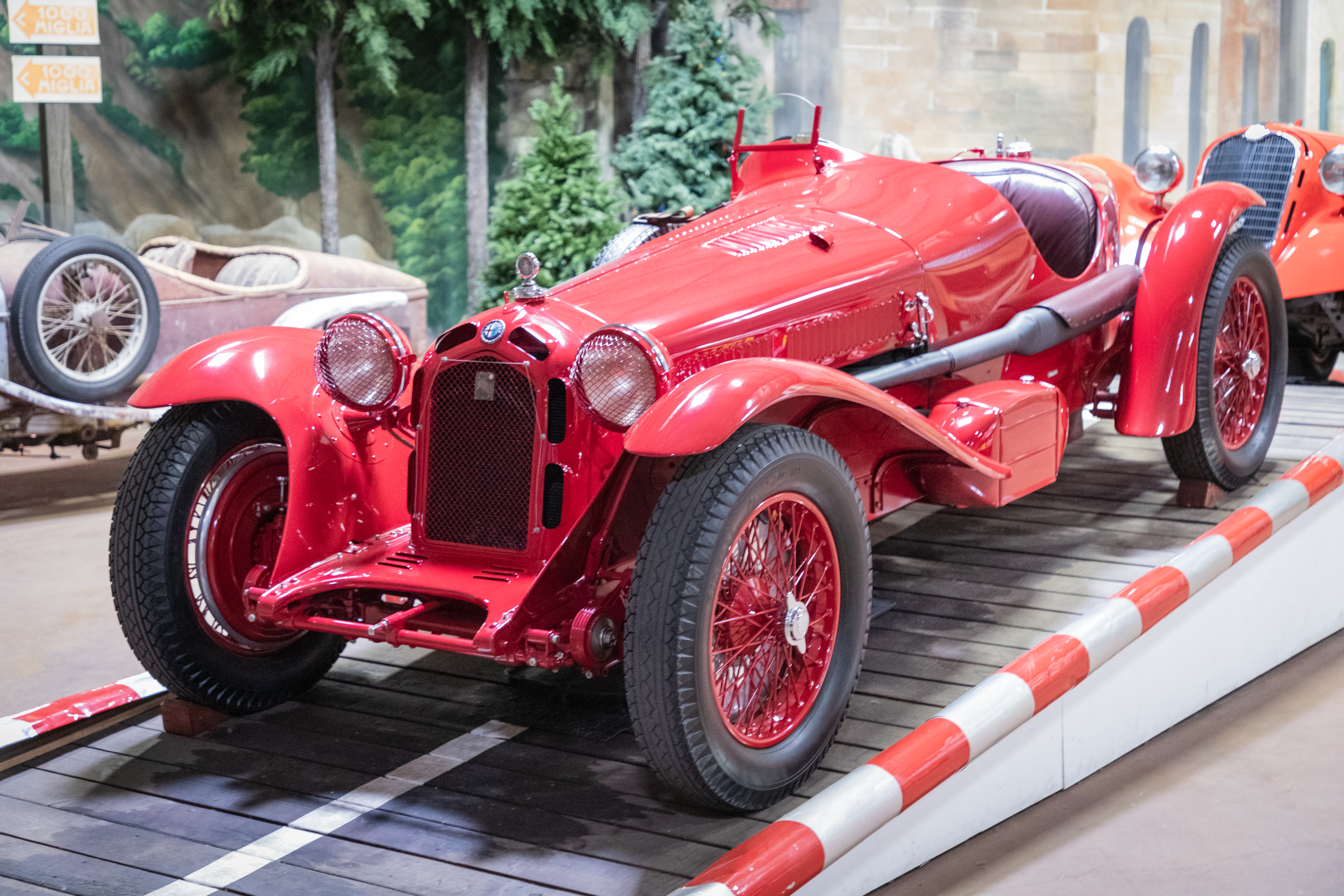
Alfa Romeo 8C-2300 Monza

For the past three years, Alfa Romeo had dominated Le Mans. The works team had been closed down, with the customer team Scuderia Ferrari representing the marque in Grand Prix racing across Europe. However, in sports-car racing, the team only competed in Italy. Eight private entrants were put forward although only half of them arrived. Both Raymond Sommer and Luigi Chinetti (winners together in 1932 and 1st and 2nd respectively in 1933) were back to contest the Biennial Cup. Sommer was aiming to equal Woolf Barnato's record winning three Le Mans in a row. He would be driving an Alfa Romeo with a Grand Prix Monza chassis owned by wealthy Parisian doctor Pierre Félix (bought through Chinetti's Alfa Romeo dealership), modified to accommodate the mandatory two rear seats. The Monza engine gave 180 bhp, an extra 25-30 bhp over the other Alfa entries. Félix had a second entry that did not eventuate. Chinetti had a corto (short-wheelbase) Mille Miglia chassis and brought in French Grand Prix racer Philippe Étancelin as his co-driver. Englishman Earl Howe had won the race in 1931 but had been unable to compete in 1933 because of an eye injury. He returned this year with his 8C-2300 Le Mans, with its 4-seater lungo (long) touring body and with former Talbot stalwart Tim Rose-Richards as his co-driver. Rose-Richards had also filed his own entry for another 8C-2300 Le Mans, driven by Owen Saunders-Davies and Freddie Clifford.

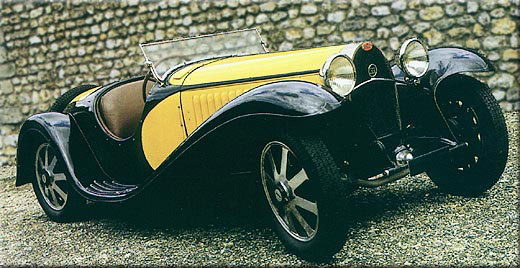
Bugatti Type 55

There were five big Bugattis entered this year. Racing journalist Roger Labric got a degree of works support, with two mechanics from Molsheim and test-driver Pierre Veyron. His was the biggest Bugatti – the supercharged 5-litre Type 50 run by the late Guy Bouriat and Albert Divo in 1931. There were three Type 55 cars entered, with their 2.3-litre supercharged engines. That of the Équipe Braillard did not arrive, while the others were of privateers Charles Brunet and Victor Bayard. There was also a privately entered 3-litre Type 44, a popular touring model but only capable of 80 bhp. It was not expected to be among the front-runners, even among the smaller British sports cars, but it would be reliable with an engine not over-stressed.

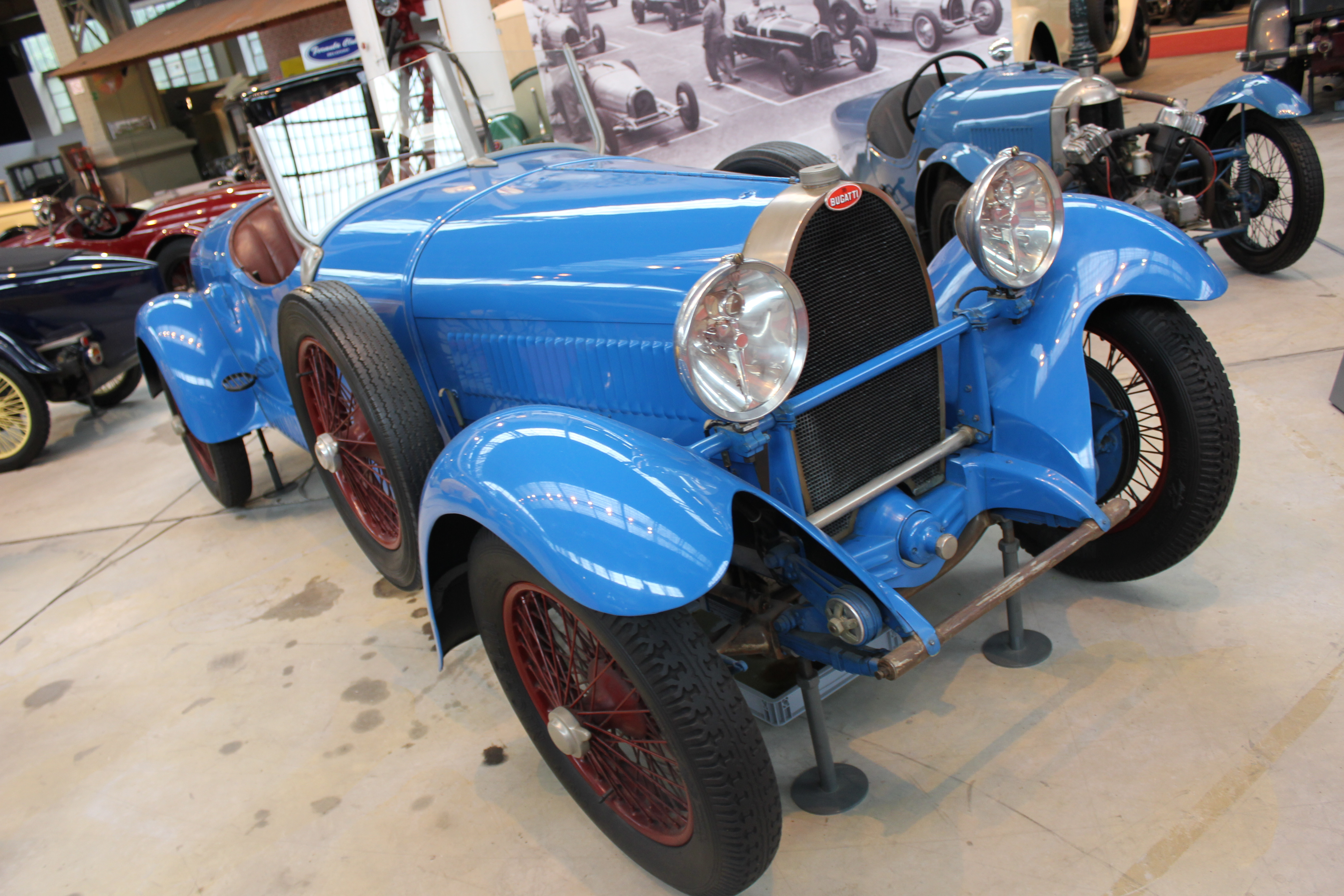
Bugatti Type 44

Once again, Prince Nicholas of Romania had the biggest car in the field, with his elegant Duesenberg Model SJ. Its supercharged 6.9-litre twin-cam engine put out 320 bhp with a top speed of 215 kp/h (135 mph). This year he was partnered by Whitney Straight, the Anglo-American with his own grand prix racing team. Labric’s 8-year old Lorraine-Dietrich was now owned by Daniel Porthault, who entered with Just-Émile Vernet, using Vernet’s tenth place finish in a Salmson last year, to take the entry to the Biennial Cup.

=== 1- to 2-litre entries ===
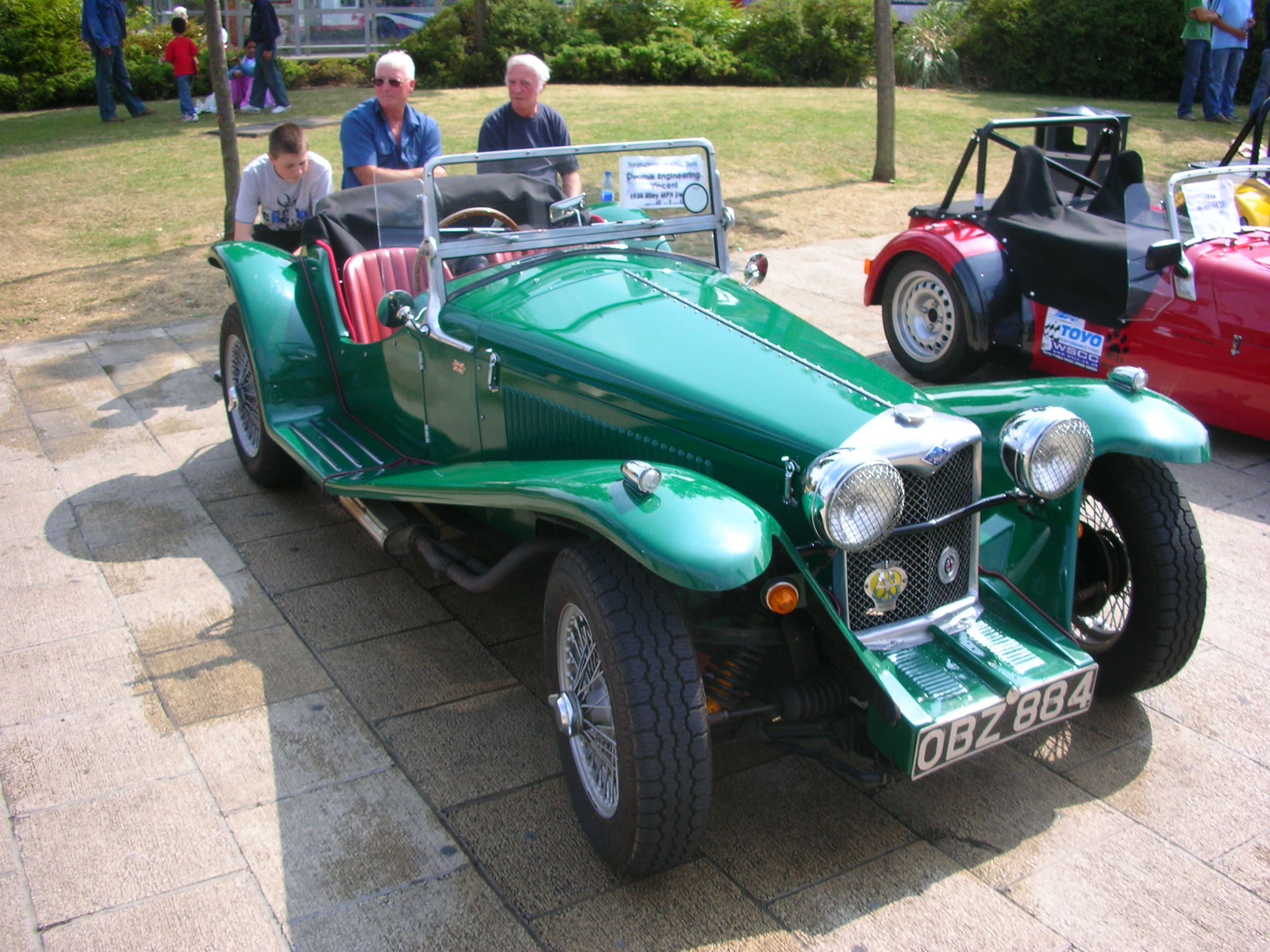
Riley MPH

British cars dominated the medium-sized categories. There were six Rileys entered, including a squad of four works cars. Following on from its successful Brooklands Six racer of the start of the decade, two new designs were unveiled in 1934. The MPH had a 1458cc straight-six engine that now put out 70 bhp, while the Riley Nine Imp, was a short-wheelbase, low-slung version of the Riley Nine, with its 50 bhp 1087cc 4-cylinder engine. For their racing debuts, five cars were brought to Le Mans. Two of the MPHs were entered, for Freddie Dixon / Cyril Paul and Frenchmen Jean Sébilleau / Georges Delaroche. There were also three Imps, including a private effort sponsored by Dorothy Champney (who would soon marry managing director Victor Riley), who had Kay Petre as her co-driver. Those five cars all had the new Wilson pre-selector gearbox. The works team also entered their last, unsold, Brooklands Nine taking the Biennial Cup spot. It was the one raced the previous year by Sébilleau / Delaroche and given to Ken Peacock and Bill van der Becke, who had earned the entry in that race finishing fourth.

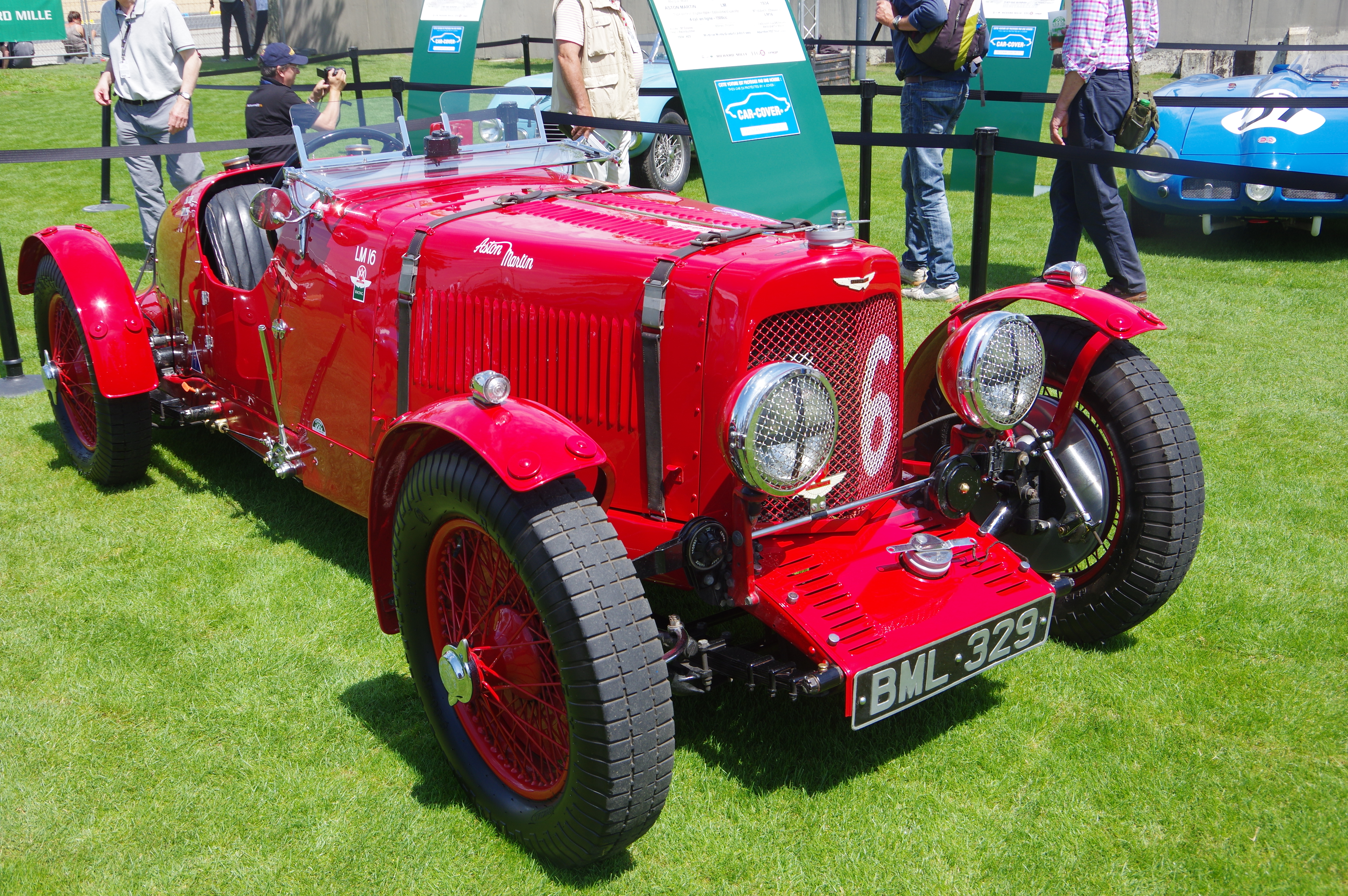
Aston Martin Le Mans

This was the first race for the new Aston Martin design, the Mark 2 Le Mans, from Technical Director ”Bert” Bertelli. The 1.5-litre engine was developed from their racing experience and in the special lightened frame, could get the cars up to 175 kp/h (110 mph). The works team was managed by former Le Mans winner Sammy Davis, with three cars, led by Bertelli himself. There were also two private entries.

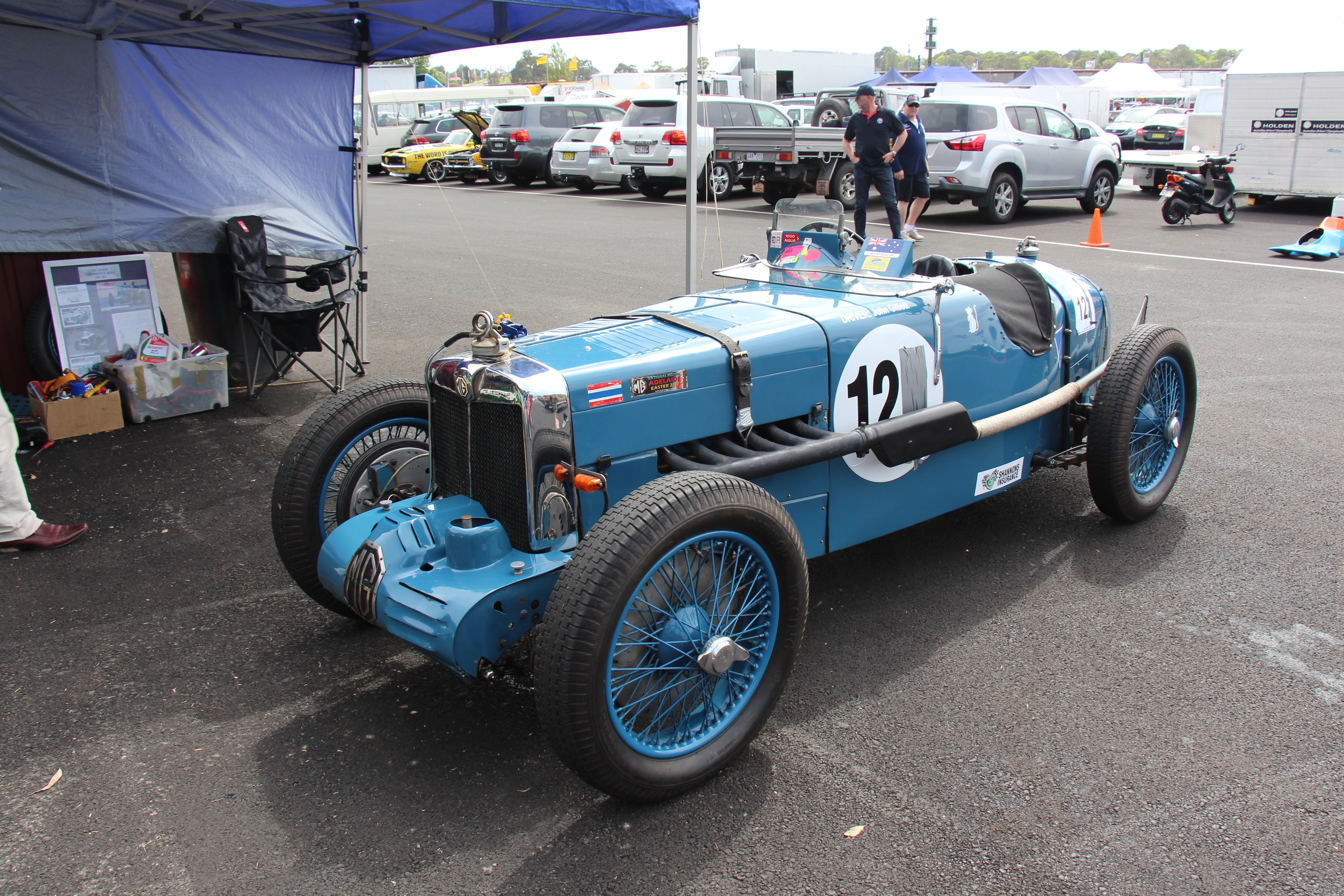
MG K3 Magnette

The MG K3 had proven to be a giant-killer in British handicap races and on the continent, including consecutive Tourist Trophy victories by Tazio Nuvolari. It was a lightened, short-wheelbase, variant of the K-series and with a Roots supercharger, the 1087cc engine could put out 115 bhp. John Ludovic Ford and Roy Eccles both brought new cars to Le Mans, however Eccles ran his one unsupercharged to get a shorter distance in the Index competition. After just a single entry last year, Singer put in a concerted effort this year. The Singer Nine Le Mans came with two engine options. The 1493cc version put out 63 bhp and was fitted with Singer’s constant-mesh gearbox. On the Hunaudières Straight, it could get up to 170 kp/h (105 mph). The company supported two customer teams, both eligible for the Biennial Cup. Stanley Barnes had raced the Singer last year. Arthur Fox had run Lagondas and Talbots at Le Mans for five years. Still awaiting the new Lagonda, he had a Biennial entry from finishing third in 1933 with an Alfa Romeo. His drivers were Brian Lewis, Baron Essendon (fresh from winning the Mannin Moar on the Isle of Man) and Johnny Hindmarsh.

Automobiles Derby was a Paris-based British company, taken over by former Bentley works driver Douglas Hawkes. He worked with renowned female motorcyclist and racer, Gwenda Stewart to develop a new four-wheel drive models. After the L2, came the L8 with a new 2-litre V8 engine that could develop 85 bhp. Two came to Le Mans- one for Stewart and Derby test driver Louis Bonne, and the other for ex-boxing champion Louis Villeneuve, and motor-racing artist Georges Hamel.

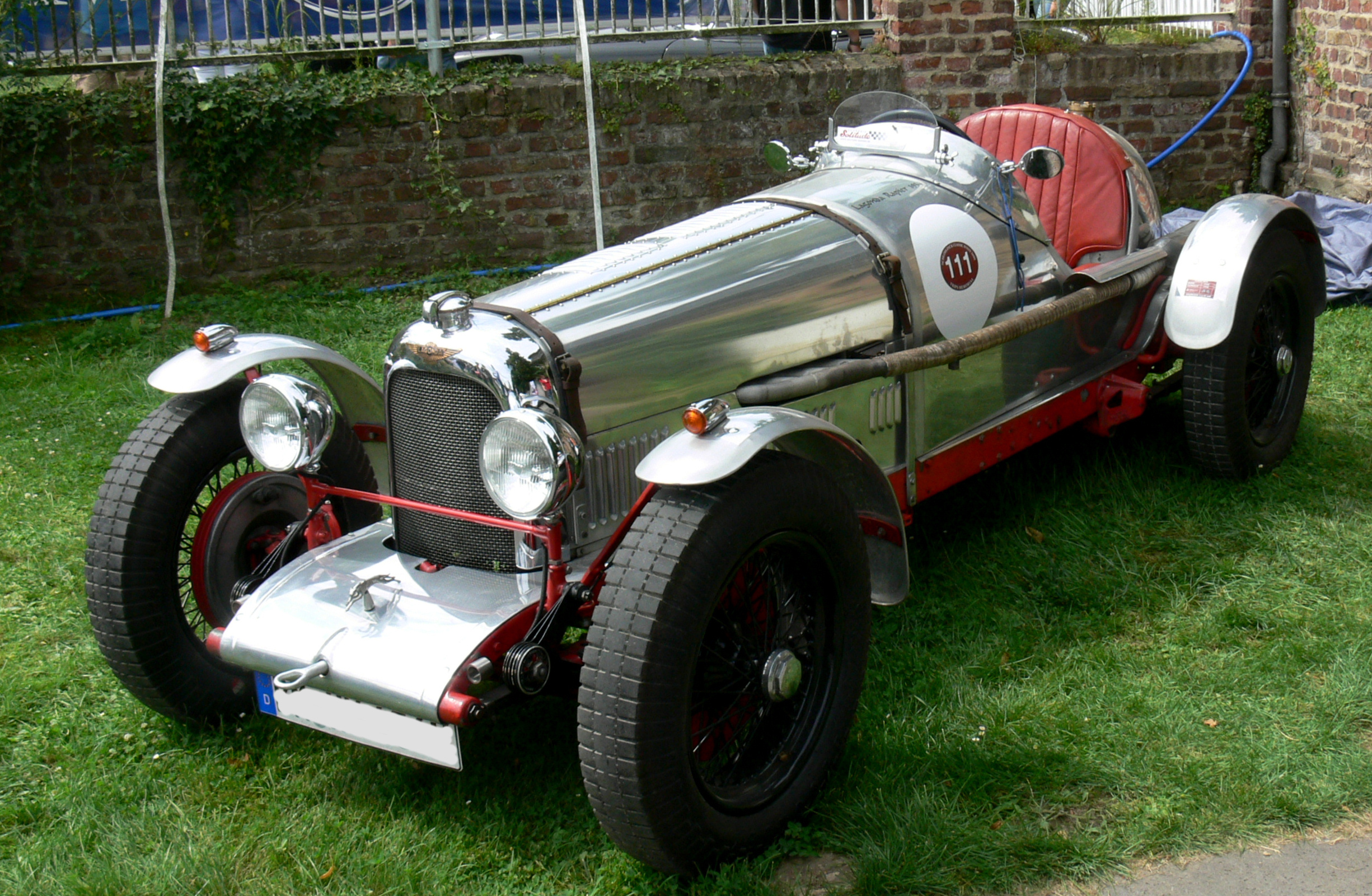
Lagonda Rapier

The other Bugatti in the field was an unusual hybrid – Auguste Bodoignet had taken the supercharged 1.5-litre Bugatti engine out of his Type 37 and instead fitted a 1351 cc straight-four supercharged Ruby K engine. His co-driver was Fernand Vallon, here for his tenth Le Mans. Another one-off special was entered by Edward Russell, Lord de Clifford. A two-seat prototype of the new Lagonda Rapier, it was fitted with a short-crankshaft 1080cc and an over-sized 82-litre fuel tank.

=== up to 1-litre entries ===
Clément-Auguste Martin, and his Équipe de l’Ours team, had bought up the race-cars from Amilcar when they retired from motor-racing. This year, in conjunction with client-drivers, he entered four cars in various configurations. A number of changes were made before the race, but in the end there was one entry in the 1-litre class and the other three had 1.1-litre side-valve engines. The most interesting variant was that of Jean de Gavardie, along with the straight-6 1092cc engine without its supercharger (which meant needing 13 fewer laps to be run), was fitted with a streamlined aluminium "tank" bodyshell. Gavardie once again had veteran Arthur Duray as his co-driver, who had formerly raced with Aries four times in the 1920s.

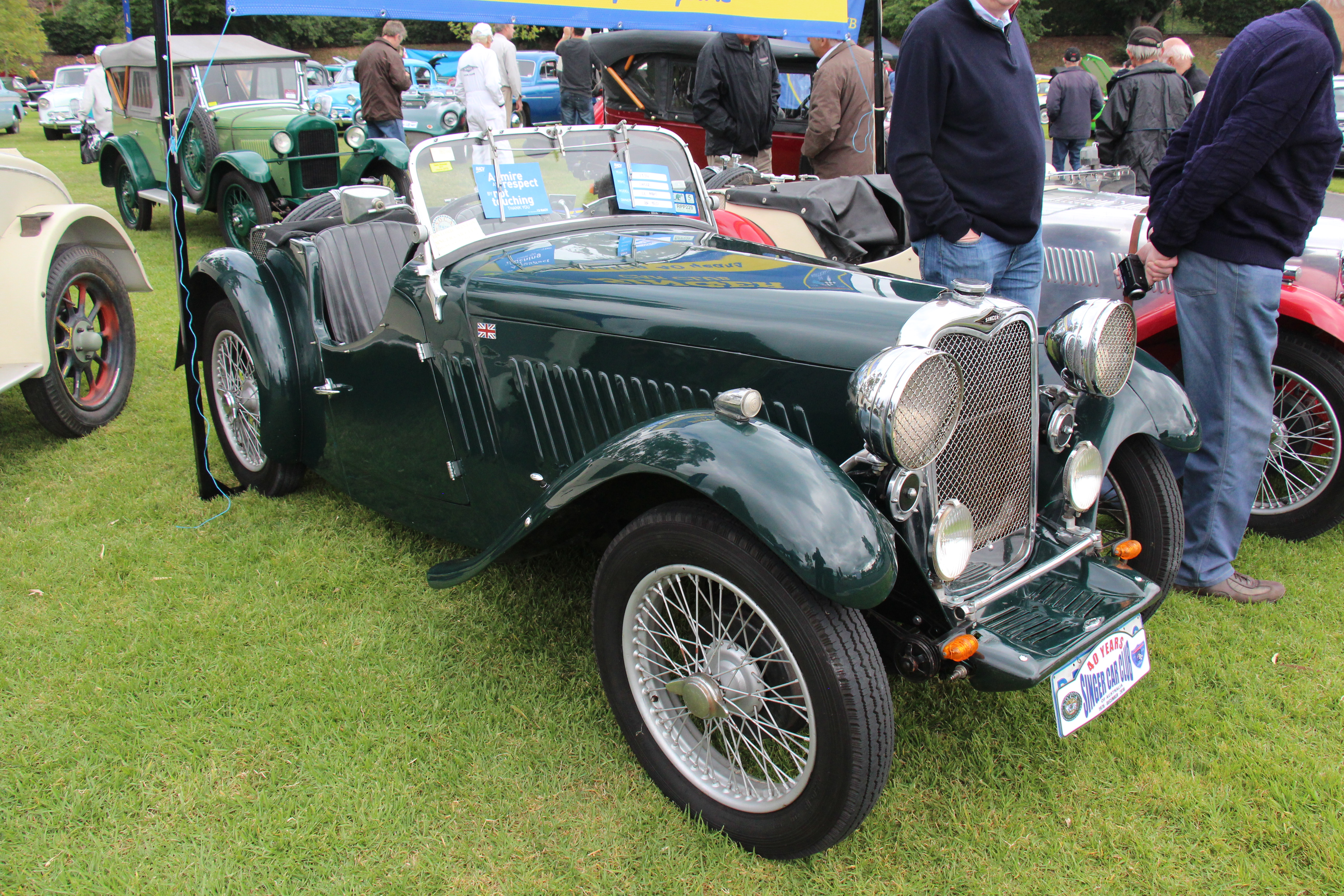
Singer Nine Le Mans

As well as the two 1.5-litre Singers, there were a further four 972cc versions entered. The engine had been developed and could put out almost 40 bhp. Two works entries (for Stan Barnes’ brother Donald with journalist Tommy Wisdom, and Norman Black/Roddy Black)were supported by two other privateer efforts. MG also had small-engine entries in the 1-litre class. The Midget PA was the successor to the J2 model. The new 847cc engine put out 36 bhp and with it strengthened chassis the car could get up to 120 kp/h (75 mph). Two were entered (including one by female hillclimb racer Anne-Cécile Rose-Itier) as well as a J4 model.

This year, the works Tracta team prepared two cars, one taking the Biennial Cup entry. The Alin brothers also returned with their BNC 527 for the Cup. However, this time they reduced the size of the Ruby engine to run in the 1-litre class. Likewise, Charles Metchim brought back his Austin 7. In the interim, he had upgraded it to the Ulster sports version. With its improved twin-carburettor engine, it was now capable of 120 kp/h (75 mph).

== Practice and Pre-Race ==
Étancelin put in the fastest lap in practice with a new lap record of 5:26. Comparative times include Brunet's Bugatti doing 5:45 and Lord Howe clocking a 5:55 in practice. The only casualty was the big Duesenberg that had an issue on the morning warm-up. The throttle valve stuck open and the excess petrol sent into the engine stripped the oil off the pistons and seized the engine.

== Race ==
=== Start ===
Raceday was fine and very hot. This year, the honorary starter was the president of the French Auto Club Vicomte de Rohan Chabot. First away was Tim Rose-Richards pursued by Raymond Sommer. Nearing the end of the first lap, "Bert" Bertelli found his Aston Martin stuck in first gear coming out of Arnage and spun in the middle of the road. The rest of the field scrambled past without hitting him. With gearbox problems, it took him half an hour to get going again. On lap three, Sommer took the lead and started putting in laps almost ten seconds faster than the rest of the field. By the end of the first hour he had built up a lead of almost two minutes. Alfa Romeos filled the top four places with Sommer, Rose-Richards, Chinetti and Saunders-Davies ahead of Veyron and Brunet in their Bugattis. An excellent seventh was John Ford's little, supercharged MG Magnette ahead of the 1.5-litre competition. At the end of the first hour, Sommer had a lead of almost a kilometre over Rose-Richards and Chinetti. However, at 5.30pm, the radio speakers announced that the leader's car had stopped, on fire out on the track. Sommer was the race's first retirement and had pulled up at Arnage with steam and smoke pouring from the engine. Soon after, Max Fourny's Bugatti ran out of petrol and when he finally got back to the pits was disqualified for receiving outside assistance. The high temperatures were melting some of the new tar-seal and marshals spread wood-chips onto the track to alleviate that. Aside from a few spins on the slippery surface there were no serious accidents. The first pit-stops were around the two-hour mark, after the mandatory 24 laps. A faster pit-change from the Chinetti-Étancelin team put them in front until Earl Howe reeled them in and retook the lead at 8.15pm, on lap 43. Meanwhile, a lap behind Saunders-Davies had pitted his Alfa Romeo from third with engine issues. Resuming in 17th, he completed only a few more laps before retiring on his lap 40 with a broken valve. So as dusk fell, this left just two Alfas in the race (albeit running 1-2).

=== Night ===
Howe led into the night until electrical problems suddenly left him with no headlights at 10.30pm. Stopping on the Hunaudières Straight, he spent over an hour making the repairs under advisement from one of his pit-crew. Getting back to the pits, he resumed in 11th place. Over the course of the next two hours, Howe drove hard to get back up to sixth place until at 1am he pitted with clutch problems that proved to be terminal. Despite now holding a sizeable lead, Chinetti and Étancelin had their own issues with a leaking fuel-tank. As the leaders the previous year had done, the mechanics used chewing gum to seal the tank. The big Labric/Veyron Bugatti was a distant second, until soon after midnight when Veyron pulled up on the Mulsanne Straight with a broken engine. This all allowed the remarkable progress of the 1.1-litre MG to continue, with Ford and Baumer now up to second, six laps behind the Alfa), ahead of the Brunet Bugatti Type 55. The Biennial Cup was being dominated by the small British cars, with the von der Becke/Peacock Riley leading the MG, with the Fothringham/Appleton Aston Martin in third, and fourth on the track. This all changed in a hectic hour: Appleton spun on gravel at the Tertre Rouge corner and stuck himself into the sandbank. He ran back to the pits for instructions and two hours later was back in action although potentially also with outside assistance (vehemently denied by Appleton). Then just before 2am, Félix Quinault spun his Tracta at Maison Blanche. John Ford braked heavily but just clipped the Tracta and ending in the roadside ditch. Following the MG, Charles Brunet was suddenly blinded by the headlights facing towards him and his Bugatti ended up in the ditch beside the MG. Anne-Cécile Rose-Itier narrowly avoided the carnage. Quinault was able to limp back to the pits and get repaired, but Ford and Brunet were both out the race.

Despite another electrical failure, Howe had got back up to sixth by 1am when clutch problems struck the Alfa. The pit-crew did their best but the damage was terminal and the "Lord-Earl" was out, now leaving just the one Alfa Romeo running. Although with a 100-km lead, their leaking fuel-tank gave the pursuing pack of small British cars hopes of an improbable victory. The Morris-Goodall Aston Martin was now second with the three Rileys of van der Becke (still leading the Biennial Cup), Sébilleau and Dixon next; the team having an excellent race.

The race settled back down through the rest of the night. After the halfway point, at 4am, two cars were disqualified after failing to complete their minimum halfway distance. Gordon Hendy’s privateer Singer had been delayed by fuel-feed issues and the gearbox of the Bertelli Aston Martin had finally packed up and taken too long to repair. By now, all but two of the large-engine cars were now retired and out the race.

=== Morning ===
As dawn broke, the Alfa Romeo had a lead of over an hour. Morris-Goodall spent seven minutes securing the steering column of his Aston Martin but was still secure in second. The three Rileys had reversed their positions, with Dixon now third, ahead of Sébilleau and van der Becke. The team had given team orders to the van der Becke car to ease off and preserve their engine, as they now had a commanding lead over its nearest competition for the Biennial Cup. Soon after 10am, triple disappointment hit the Aston Martin team. Appleton had pitted with low oil-pressure then stopped out on the track. Then, after running second for almost eight hours, the engine of Morris-Goodall’s Aston Martin suffered a broken oil pipe stranding him out on the track. To cap it off, all on the same lap, the private Aston of Reggie Tongue crept into the pits with a shredded tyre.

=== Finish and post-race ===
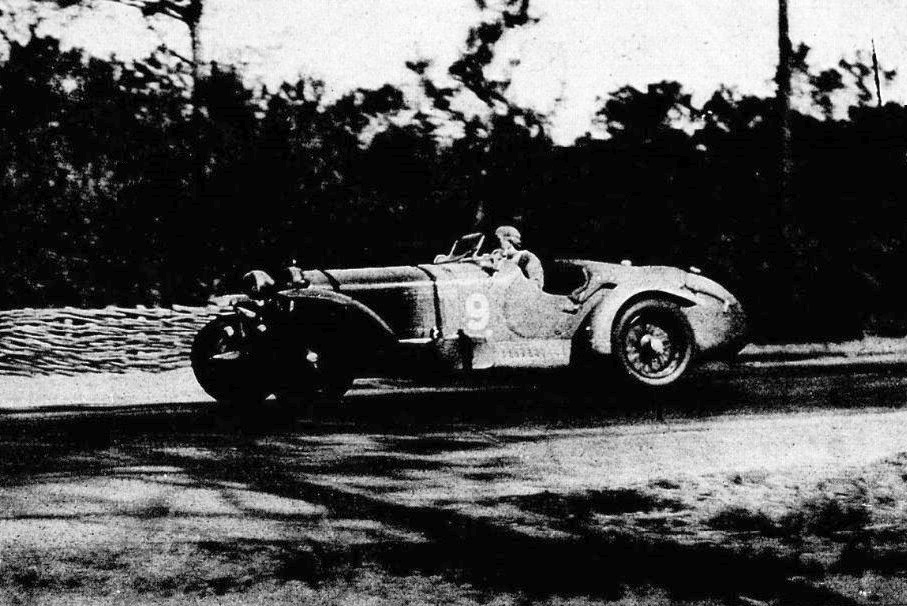
Philippe Étancellin, the winner of the 1934 Le Mans

But the demise of the Aston Martins were the final retirements, as the remainder of the field held on to reach the finish. Chinetti and Étancelin took the flag with a large margin of 13 laps 180 km (110 mi) – the biggest of the decade, and second only to the Bentley win in 1927. In contrast, having been without direct competition for over half the race, the gentler pace of the winners as they eased off meant it was the shortest distance covered in the decade. Having 23 finishers was the highest number since the very first race back in 1923. However, with virtually all the other big-engine cars retiring, the podiums were dominated by the smaller cars and in a fine result for British motoring, 16 of those cars were British cars.

The Riley works team took four of the next five places, led by Sébilleau/Delaroche, a lap ahead of Dixon/Paul. The 1.1-litre car of Peacock/van der Becke, coming home in fifth, repeated their victory in the Index of Performance from the year before, completing an outstanding 52 laps (37%) over target. This time, however, the margin was far narrower, finishing less than 3km ahead of team-mates Newsome/Maclure. But the consecutive results also meant they had a guaranteed win in the Biennial Cup.

Interrupting the Riley procession was the supercharged MG Magnette of Eccles/Martin. They had overtaken the unsupercharged Riley earlier in the afternoon as the latter concentrated on finishing for trophy victories. Seventh was the Lewis/Hindmarsh Singer. Delayed early on for 45 minutes with carburettor problems, they had driven very hard through the night and all Sunday back up the field, making up time. Although only 9km behind van der Becke, they had a tougher Index target with their 1.5-litre engine and finished second in the Biennial Cup. The quasi-works Singer of Frank Barnes was eighth and wrapped up a 1-2-3 for British cars in the Cup.

The Bugatti tourer of Mahé/Desvignes was the only other car over 2-litres to finish, aside from the winner, coming home in ninth. Not built for speed, it was easier on its engine and having got into the top-ten during the night, its reliability got it to the end. De Clifford bought his Lagonda home in 16th place. Early in the night a stone had been thrown up and struck him in the face, smashing his goggles. Thereafter they had run steadily until lunchtime when the engine dropped a cylinder. Among the female drivers, fortunes were mixed: Champney and Petre had an uneventful race and came home in 13th. Anne-Cécile Rose-Itier also had a trouble-free run, going to a prescribed pace and finishing 17th. Her MG beat its target distance by 30 laps. Gwenda Stewart only ran sixteen laps in the new Derby-Miller before the engine packed up. Later in the year though, she set a new speed record at Monthlèry in the car.

Étancelin was honoured with a civic reception in his home city of Rouen and he resolved to drive the winning Alfa Romeo to the event. The car was filled with petrol for the journey, but by the time he brought his bags down from the hotel, the gas had leaked out all over the forecourt, as the fuel tank had not been repaired since the finish. After a solid run in Le Mans, a fortnight later, Mahé and Desvignes took the Bugatti Type 44 to victory at Spa, this year run as a 10-hour touring car race. The next year, Lord de Clifford gained notoriety as the last British peer tried in the House of Lords. He was an advocate for compulsory driver licences and speed limits, which came into British law in 1934. He was accused of speeding when involved in a fatal head-on car accident from a car travelling on the wrong side of the road. With the evidence provided he was acquitted. This was the last race for Tracta. Founder Jean-Albert Grégoire instead chose to market the innovative four-wheel drive technology and work with other manufacturers. Alongside Panhard and Alvis, the most significant collaboration was with Willys that used it with its Jeep.

== Official results ==
=== Finishers ===
Results taken from Quentin Spurring’s book, officially licensed by the ACO Class Winners are in Bold text.

Pos	Class	No.	Team	Drivers	Chassis	Engine	Tyre	Target distance*	Laps
1	**>3.0****	**9**	**(Italy) L. Chinetti** (private entrant)	**(Italy) Luigi Chinetti** **(France) Philippe Étancelin**	Alfa Romeo 8C-2300 MM-LM	Alfa Romeo 2.3L S8 supercharged	E	187 [B]	213
2	**1.5**	**27**	**(United Kingdom) Riley (Coventry Ltd)**	**(France) Jean Sébilleau** **(France) Georges Delaroche**	Riley 12/6 MPH Racing	Riley 1458cc S6	D	155	200
3	1.5	28	(United Kingdom) Riley (Coventry Ltd)	(United Kingdom) Freddie Dixon (United Kingdom) Cyril Paul	Riley 12/6 MPH Racing	Riley 1458cc S6	D	155	199
4	1.5	34	(United Kingdom) R. Eccles (private entrant)	(United Kingdom) Roy Eccles (United Kingdom) Charlie Martin	MG K3 Magnette	MG 1087cc S6	D	143	197
5	1.5	36	(United Kingdom) Riley (Coventry Ltd	(United Kingdom) Kenneth Peacock (United Kingdom) Alex “Bill” van der Becke	Riley Nine Brooklands	Riley 1087cc S4	D	143 [B]	195
6	1.5	37	(United Kingdom) Riley (Coventry Ltd	(United Kingdom) Sammy Newsome (United Kingdom) Edgar Maclure	Riley Nine Imp	Riley 1087cc S4	D	143	195
7	1.5	26	(United Kingdom) Arthur W. Fox	(United Kingdom) Brian Lewis, Baron Essendon (United Kingdom) Johnny Hindmarsh	Singer Nine Le Mans 1½ Litre	Singer 1493cc S4	D	156 [B]	195
8	1.5	25	(United Kingdom) F. S. Barnes (private entrant)	(United Kingdom) F. Stanley Barnes (United Kingdom) Alf Langley	Singer Nine Le Mans 1½ Litre	Singer 1493cc S4	D	156 [B]	192
9	**3.0**	**4**	**(France) N.-J. Mahé** (private entrant)	**(France) Norbert Jean Mahé** **(France) Jean Desvignes**	Bugatti Type 44	Bugatti 3.0L S8	E	182	191
10	1.5	20	(United Kingdom) “A. Vincent” (R.E. Tongue) (private entrant)	(United Kingdom) Reggie Tongue (United Kingdom) Maurice Faulkner	Aston Martin 1½ Le Mans	Aston Martin 1496cc S4	D	156	188
11	1.5	24	(United Kingdom) J. Noël (private entrant)	(United Kingdom) John Cecil Noël (United Kingdom) Jen Wheeler	Aston Martin 1½ Le Mans	Aston Martin 1496cc S4	D	156	180
12	1.5	39	(France) J. Trévoux (private entrant)	(France) Jean Trévoux (France) René Carriére	Riley Nine Imp	Riley 1087cc S4	D	143	174
13	1.5	38	(United Kingdom) Miss D. Champney (private entrant)	(United Kingdom) Dorothy Champney (Canada) Kay Petre	Riley Nine Imp	Riley 1087cc S4	D	143	172
14	1.5	32	(France) Équipe de l’Ours (France) J. de Gavardie	(France) Jean de Gavardie (France) Arthur Duray	Amilcar C6; Spéciale Martin	Amilcar 1092cc S6	D	144 [B]	168
15	**1.0**	**48**	**(United Kingdom) Singer Motors Ltd**	**(United Kingdom) Norman Black** **(United Kingdom) Roddy Baker**	Singer Nine Le Mans	Singer 973cc S4	D	139	163
16	1.5	40	(United Kingdom) Lord de Clifford (private entrant)	(United Kingdom) Edward Russell, Lord de Clifford (United Kingdom) Charles Brackenbury	Lagonda Rapier; De Clifford Special	Lagonda 1080cc S4	D	143	163
17	1.0	52	(France) Mme A.-C. Rose-Itier (private entrant)	(France) Anne-Cécile Rose-Itier (France) Charles Duruy	MG PA Midget	MG 844cc S4	D	132	162
18	1.0	47	(United Kingdom) Singer Motors Ltd	(United Kingdom) Tommy Wisdom (United Kingdom) Donald Barnes	Singer Nine Le Mans	Singer 973cc S4	D	139	161
19	1.0	44	(France) SA des Automobiles; Tracta	(France) Félix Quinault (France) “Daniélault” (David Marchand)	Tracta Type A	SCAP 996cc S4	D	140 [B]	158
20	1.5	42	(France) Équipe de l’Ours (France) C.-A. Martin	(France) Charles-Auguste Martin (France) Fernand Pousse	Amilcar C6/4; Spéciale Martin	Amilcar 1075cc S4	D	143	155
21	1.0	45	(France) Alin Fréres (private entrant)	(France) Adrien Alin (France) Albert Alin	BNC Type 527 Sport	Ruby 992cc S4	D	140 [B]	150
22	1.0	31	(France) Équipe de l'Ours (France) C. Poiré	(France) Camille Poiré (France) Gaston Robail	Amilcar C6/4; Spéciale Martin	Amilcar 998cc S4	D	140	148
23	1.0	50	(United Kingdom) R.P. Gardner (private entrant)	(United Kingdom) Goldie Gardner (United Kingdom) Alfred Beloë	Singer Nine Le Mans	Singer 973cc S4	D	139	143

=== Did not finish ===
Pos	Class	No	Team	Drivers	Chassis	Engine	Tyre	Target distance*	Laps	Reason
DNF	1.5	23	(United Kingdom) Aston Martin Ltd	(United Kingdom) Mortimer Morris-Goodall (United Kingdom) Jim Elwes	Aston Martin 1½ Le Mans	Aston Martin 1494cc S4	D	156	155	engine (18 hr)
DNF	1.5	22	(United Kingdom) Aston Martin Ltd	(United Kingdom) Thomas Fotheringham-Parker (United Kingdom) John Appleton	Aston Martin 1½ Le Mans	Aston Martin 1494cc S4	D	156 [B]	141	engine (18 hr)
DNF	>3.0	3	(France) J.-É. Vernet (private entrant)	(France) Just-Émile Vernet (France) Daniel Porthault	Lorraine-Dietrich B3-6 Le Mans	Lorraine-Dietrich 3.5L S6	D	190 [B]	133	engine (~dawn)
DNF	1.0	54	(United Kingdom) H.B. Metchim (private entrant)	(United Kingdom) Charles Metchim (United Kingdom) Cecil Masters	Austin 7 Ulster	Austin 749cc S4	D	127	95	electrics (~21 hr)
DNF	2.0 **	29	(France) A. Bodoignet (private entrant)	(France) Auguste Bodoignet (France) Fernand Vallon	Bugatti Type 37A Spéciale	Ruby 1351cc S4 supercharged	D	161	90	engine (~16 hr)
DNF	2.0 **	33	(United Kingdom) J.L. Ford (private entrant)	(United Kingdom) John Ludovic Ford (United Kingdom) Maurice Baumer	MG K3 Magnette	MG 1087cc S6 supercharged	D	157 [B]	85	accident (10 hr)
DNF	>3.0 **	6	(United Kingdom) Earl Howe (private entrant)	(United Kingdom) Francis Curzon, Earl Howe (United Kingdom) Tim Rose-Richards	Alfa Romeo 8C-2300 LM	Alfa Romeo 2.4L S8 supercharged	D	181	85	transmission (10 hr)
DNF	1.5	30	(France) J.-É. Vernet (private entrant)	(France) Albert Debille (France) Jean Viale	Salmson GS Spéciale	Salmson 1094cc S4	D	149	82	? (dawn)
DNF	>3.0 **	14	(France) C. Brunet (private entrant)	(France) Charles Brunet (France) "Jean Renaldi" (André Carré)	Bugatti Type 55	Bugatti 2.3L S8 supercharged	D	185	75	accident (10 hr)
DNF	>3.0	2	(France) R. Labric (private entrant)	(France) Roger Labric (France) Pierre Veyron	Bugatti Type 50S	Bugatti 4.9L S8 supercharged	D	196	73	engine (9 hr)
DSQ	1.0	49	(United Kingdom) G. Hendy (private entrant)	(United Kingdom) Gordon Hendy (United Kingdom) James Boulton	Singer Nine Le Mans	Singer 973cc S4	D	139	59	insufficient distance (13 hr)
DSQ	1.5	21	(United Kingdom) Aston Martin Ltd	(United Kingdom) Augustus "Bert" Bertelli (United Kingdom) Clifton Penn-Hughes	Aston Martin 1½ Le Mans	Aston Martin 1496cc S4	D	156 [B]	59	insufficient distance (13 hr)
DNF	2.0	16	(France) L. Villeneuve (private entrant)	(France) Louis Villeneuve (France) “Géo Ham” (Georges Hamel)	Derby L8	Derby 1996cc V8	D	164	44	transmission (night)
DNF	>3.0 **	5	(United Kingdom) T. Rose-Richards (private entrant)	(United Kingdom) Freddy Clifford (United Kingdom) Owen Saunders-Davies	Alfa Romeo 8C-2300 LM	Alfa Romeo 2.4L S8 supercharged	D	188	40	engine (5 hr)
DNF	1.0	46	(France) R. Gaillard (private entrant)	(France) Raymond Gaillard (France) Paul Vallée	Rally NCP	Salmson 989cc S4	D	139	38	? (nightfall)
DNF	1.5 **	53	(France) P. Maillard-Brune (private entrant)	(France) Philippe Maillard-Brune (France) Charles Druck	MG J4 Midget	MG 745cc S4 supercharged	D	142	30	engine (evening)
DNF	1.0	43	(France) SA des Automobiles; Tracta	(France) Pierre Padrault (France) . Charlault	Tracta Type A	SCAP 999cc S4	D	140	23	electrics (evening)
DNF	2.0	18	(United Kingdom) Miss G. Stewart (private entrant)	(United Kingdom) Gwenda Stewart (United Kingdom) Louis Bonne	Derby L8	Derby 1996cc V8	D	163	16	engine (evening)
DSQ	>3.0 **	15	(France) V. Bayard (private entrant)	(France) Max Fourny (France) Louis Decaroli	Bugatti Type 55	Bugatti 2.3L S8 supercharged	D	185	15	outside assistance
DNF	1.5	41	(France) Équipe de l’Ours (France) G. Boursin	(France) Georges Boursin (France) Jean Nadeau	Amilcar C6/4; Spéciale Martin	Amilcar 1080cc S4	E	143	14	radiator (~3 hr)
DNF	>3.0 **	7	(France) R. Sommer (private entrant)	(France) Raymond Sommer (France) Dr Pierre Félix	Alfa Romeo 8C-2300 Monza-LM	Alfa Romeo 2.4L S8 supercharged	D	187 [B]	14	engine (2 hr)
Sources:

- Note *: [B]= car also entered in the 1933-34 Biennial Cup.
- Note **: equivalent class for supercharging, with x1.4 modifier to engine capacity.

=== Did not start ===
Pos	Class	No	Team	Drivers	Chassis	Engine	Reason
DNS	>3.0 **	1	(Romania) N. von Hohenzollern- Sigmaringen (private entrant)	Prince Nicholas of Romania (United States) / (United Kingdom) Whitney Straight	Duesenberg Model SJ	Duesenberg 7.0L S8 supercharged	Engine
DNA	>3.0 **	8	(France) P. Félix (private entrant)	(France) Dr Pierre Félix	Alfa Romeo 8C-2300 Monza-LM	Alfa Romeo 2.3L S8 supercharged	Did not arrive
DNA	>3.0 **	10	(France) P. Louis-Dreyfus (private entrant)	(France) "Heldé" (Pierre Louis-Dreyfus)	Alfa Romeo 8C-2300 Monza-LM	Alfa Romeo 2.3L S8 supercharged	Did not arrive
DNA	>3.0 **	11	(France) Équipe Braillard	(France)	Alfa Romeo 8C-2300 Monza-LM	Alfa Romeo 2.3L S8 supercharged	Did not arrive
DNA	>3.0 **	12	(France) Équipe Braillard	(France)	Bugatti Type 55	Bugatti 2.3L S8 supercharged	Did not arrive
DNA	2.0	19	(France) O. Siko (private entrant)	(France) Odette Siko	Alfa Romeo 6C-1750 SS	Alfa Romeo 1750cc S6	Did not arrive

=== 1934 Index of Performance ===
Pos	1933-34 Biennial Cup	Class	No.	Team	Drivers	Chassis	Index Result
1	1st	1.5	36	(United Kingdom) Riley (Coventry) Ltd	(United Kingdom) Kenneth Peacock (United Kingdom) Alex “Bill” van der Becke	Riley Nine Brooklands	1.370
2	-	1.5	37	(United Kingdom) Riley (Coventry) Ltd	(United Kingdom) Sammy Newsome (United Kingdom) Edgar Maclure	Riley Nine Imp	1.368
3	-	1.5	27	(United Kingdom) Riley (Coventry) Ltd	(France) Jean Sébilleau (France) Georges Delaroche	Riley 12/6 MPH Racing	1.294
4	-	1.5	28	(United Kingdom) Riley (Coventry) Ltd	(United Kingdom) Freddie Dixon (United Kingdom) Cyril Paul	Riley 12/6 MPH Racing	1.284
5	-	1.5	34	(United Kingdom) R. Eccles (private entrant)	(United Kingdom) Roy Eccles (United Kingdom) Charlie Martin	MG K3 Magnette	1.264
6	2nd	1.5	26	(United Kingdom) Arthur W. Fox	(United Kingdom) Brian Lewis, Baron Essendon (United Kingdom) Johnny Hindmarsh	Singer Nine Le Mans 1½ Litre	1.255
7	3rd	1.5	25	(United Kingdom) F. S. Barnes (private entrant)	(United Kingdom) F. Stanley Barnes (United Kingdom) Alf Langley	Singer Nine Le Mans 1½ Litre	1.239
8	-	1.0	52	(France) A.-C. Rose-Itier (private entrant)	(France) Anne-Cécile Rose-Itier (France) Charles Duruy	MG PA Midget	1.234
9	-	1.5	39	(France) J. Trévoux (private entrant)	(France) Jean Trévoux (France) René Carriére	Riley Nine Imp	1.220
10	-	1.5	20	(United Kingdom) “A. Vincent” (R.E. Tongue) (private entrant)	(United Kingdom) Reggie Tongue (United Kingdom) Maurice Faulkner	Aston Martin 1½ Le Mans	1.211

- Note: A score of 1.00 means meeting the minimum distance for the car, and a higher score is exceeding the nominal target distance. Only the top-10 finishers are listed

=== Class Winners ===
Class	Winning car	Winning drivers
3 to 8-litre	#9 Alfa Romeo 8C-2300 MM-LM	Chinetti / Étancelin
2 to 3-litre	#4 Bugatti Type 44	Mahé / Desvignes
1500 to 2000cc	no finishers	
1000 to 1500cc	#27 Riley 12/6 MPH Racing	Sébilleau / Delaroche *
Up to 1000cc	#48 Singer Nine Le Mans	Blake / Baker
Note *: setting a new class distance record.

=== Statistics ===
- Fastest Lap – P. Étancelin, #9 Alfa Romeo 8C-2300 MM-LM – 5:41.0secs; 142.44 km/h (88.51 mph)
- Winning Distance – 2,866.94 km (1,781.43 mi)
- Winner’s Average Speed – 120.29 km/h (74.74 mph)
