= Reggie Tongue (racing driver) =

British racing driver (1912–1992)

Personal details
- Born: Reginald Ellis Tongue; 17 July 1912 Urmston, Lancashire
- Died: 1 June 1992 (aged 79) Lancaster, Lancashire
- Spouse: Ivy May Walker (m. 1944)
- Education: Sedbergh School
- Alma mater: Exeter College, Oxford

Military service
- Allegiance: United Kingdom
- Branch/service: Royal Air Force Vounteer Reserve
- Rank: Flight Lieutenant
- Unit: 504 Squadron; 249 Squadron; 46 Squadron; 71 Squadron
- Battles/wars: Battle of Britain

24 Hours of Le Mans career
- Years: 1934
- Teams: M.R.E. Tongue
- Best finish: 10th

Reginald Ellis Tongue (17 July 1912 – 1 June 1992), from Lancashire, was a British racing driver, test pilot and Royal Air Force officer who flew in the Battle of Britain.

== Personal life ==
Tongue was born into a wealthy family and his motor experience was "loaning" his father's 1924 10/23 Talbot two-seater, destroying the lawn in front of the house during the process. He was educated at Sedbergh School and Exeter College, Oxford where he read medicine and learnt to fly with the Oxford University Air Squadron.

== Motor Racing Career ==
In 1934 Reggie competed in his first major race in the 1934 24 Hours of Le Mans, aged 22.

During the 1930s he placed well in a handful of Voiturette races and won the Cork Grand Prix handicap race on 16 May 1936.

In 1951, Tongue competed at the Rallye Monte-Carlo, driving a Jaguar Mark V with his co-driver P.E. Warr. The Englishman finished the race in 31st.

== Military career ==
Tongue had learnt to fly at Oxford University and joined the Royal Air Force Volunteer Reserve in 1940 and served with 46, 71 and 249 squadrons during the Second World War. In 1942, Tongue became a test pilot at Rolls Royce.
