= Dorothy Champney =

- in her car in 1934
- Born: 7 March 1909; Scarborough
- Died: 22 July 1968 (aged 59); Moreton-in-Marsh
- Other names: Dorothy Riley
- Spouse: Victor Riley
- Children: two

Dorothy Conyers Nelson Champney became Dorothy Riley (7 March 1909 – 22 July 1968) was a British rally driver who drove the fastest car by a woman in the 1934 Le Mans 24 hour race partnered by Kay Petre.

== Life ==
Champney was born in Scarborough in 1909. Her parents were Gerthrude (born Wilcox) and Colonel Frederick D'Arcy Champney who was of "independent means".

1933 was a good year, she and Miss L. Hobbs took the ladies award in the ladies' prize international Alpine cup. She was also the first woman in her Riley Kestrel in that years Scottish Rally. There were nearly sixty class one drivers that year and a third of them were women. Champney beat Jackie Astbury in a Singer and Marjorie Smith in a Alvis.

In 1934 she who drove the fastest car by a woman in the 1934 Le Mans 24 hour race. She was partnered by Kay Petre in a Riley Ulster Imp. She married Victor Riley who led the Riley car company in 1934. The Riley car business got into debt and in 1938 it was sold and eventually absorbed into the Morris Car company. Victor was a director on that company from 1939 to 1948. They had two children and she continued her interest in racing and cars.

Champney died in Moreton-in-Marsh in 1968 having outlived her husband by just over ten years.
