= Edgar Maclure =

British racing driver (1906-67)

- Born: Edgar Martyn Maclure; 12 October 1906 Kensington, Middlesex
- Died: 28 November 1967 (aged 61) Meriden, Warwickshire

Edgar Martyn Maclure (12 October 1906 – 28 November 1967) was a British racing driver.

== Career ==
Edgar was the brother of Percy Maclure, and, like his more successful brother, was closely linked with the Riley concern; indeed most of his notable sportscar races were at the wheel of Rileys, and, like his brother, lived in Fillongley during his career.

His most notable racing achievements were finishing 8th in the 1932 RAC Tourist Trophy in a Riley Six, 5th at the 1000km of Brooklands with Alex von der Becke) in a Riley 9 Brooklands, 6th at the 1934 24 Hours of Le Mans (3rd in class, and 2nd in the Index of Performance) (with Sammy Newsome) in a Riley Nine Imp, and 2nd in the 1935 International 500 Miles Race at Brooklands, again with von der Becke in a Riley Brooklands. It took the might of the Napier-Railton to beat the pair into second place.

In 1932 he was one of the two main drivers, along with regular record-breaker George Eyston, who set a number of speed and endurance records at Montlhéry for Riley, culminating in averaging 82.41mph over 24 hours.

An attempt at the 1934 Monte Carlo Rally, again in a Riley, proved disastrous; en route to the starting point in Bucharest, Maclure and co-driver Cameron Brown were held up for two hours by German customs, who told them that they should drive on the left in Poland - the pair were disabused of this regulation when hitting a police car coming towards them soon after crossing the border.

Maclure's only Grand Prix appearance came at the 1935 Donington Grand Prix, sharing his brother's Riley 6, and "was the most daring on Starkey's Corner, which he took in a number of lurid skids". The car retired at three-quarter distance.

Maclure was entered for the 1936 24 Hours of Le Mans, but the race was cancelled, and Maclure seems to have retired from racing at this time, his last race being at Donington in May. He had married in 1935, but obtained a divorce in 1947.

== Le Mans results ==
Year	Team	Co-Drivers	Car	Class	Laps	Pos.	Class Pos.
1934	(United Kingdom) Riley	(United Kingdom) Sammy Newsome	Riley Ulster Imp	1.1	196	6th	3rd
1935	(United Kingdom) Riley	(United Kingdom) Sammy Newsome	Riley Nine	1.5	47	ret	ret
