= Kay Petre =

Canadian racing driver (1903–1994)

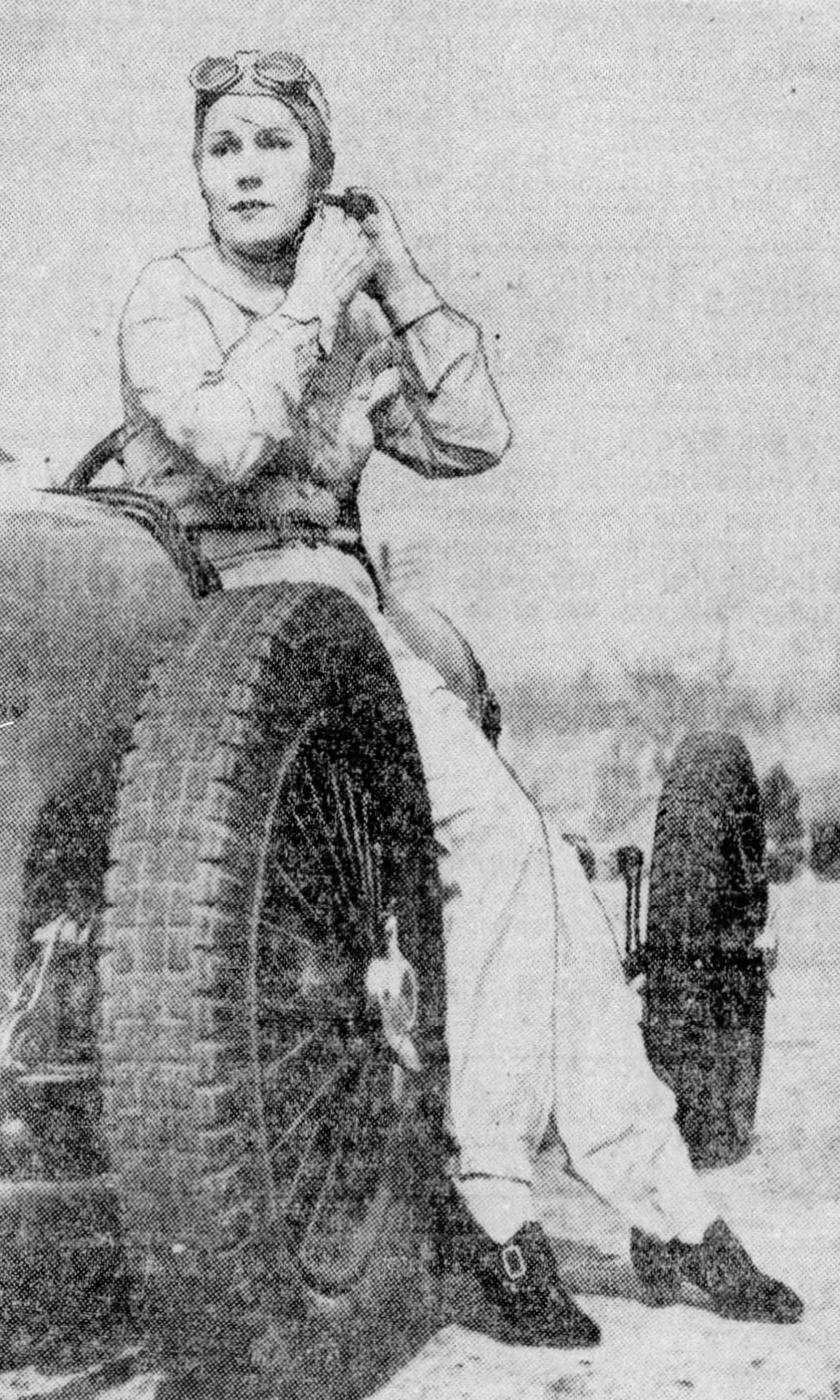
- Petre in 1938
- Born: Kathleen Coad Defries; 10 May 1903; Toronto, Ontario, Canada
- Died: 10 August 1994 (aged 91)
- Occupation: Racing driver
- Spouse(s): Langlois D. Lefroy (m. 1924-1924; his death); Henry Petre (m. 1929-1962; his death)

Kathleen Coad Petre (née Defries; 10 May 1903 – 10 August 1994), known as Kay Petre, was an early motor racing star. She was born in York, Ontario, Canada now part of Toronto.

== Family ==
Kathleen Coad Defries was the daughter of Robert Leo Defries KC (died 1957) and his wife, Annie Gray. Her father was a barrister in Toronto. She spent her later schooldays in England, but returned to Canada in her twenties. After a period studying art in Paris, she returned to Canada to marry Langlois D. Lefroy, the son of A.H.Frazer Lefroy and Dora Strathy, in 1924. She was widowed two months later. In 1929, she married, secondly, to the Englishman Henry Aloysius Petre (1884–1962), who forsook a law career to pursue an interest in aviation. They had no children.

== Racing career ==
Petre was a star at the English Brooklands track, and the exploits of this 4' 10" lady caused a media sensation at the time. The abiding image of Petre is a tiny woman seated in a huge 10.5 litre V12 Delage. This was the car in which she battled for the Women's Outer Circuit Record at Brooklands with Gwenda Stewart. Petre gained the upper hand on 26 October 1934 with a 129.58 mph lap, but in August 1935 Stewart fought back with a faster lap. A determined Petre took her record back the same day with a 134.75 mph pass but Stewart, driving the Derby-Miller, had the last laugh three days later at 135.95 mph.

At Brooklands: "Kay Petre got three lap records, her first two in 1934, first in a Bugatti at 124 mph then in a Delage at 129.58 mph. In 1935 she used the Delage to achieve 134.75."

Although she is always associated with the Delage, Petre started racing in a Wolseley Hornet Special bought for her by her husband. She also raced an Invicta and a Bugatti in which she won a handicap race in 1935. However, she was most successful in a series of Rileys. She was ninth in the Mountain Grand Prix at Brooklands in a Riley 1.5 in 1934, against tough opposition. Her first visit to Le Mans was also that year. She and Dorothy Champney finished 13th, driving a Riley Ulster Imp. The Riley connection continued next year, but Petre and Elsie "Bill" Wisdom failed to finish with a blown engine.

Between 1934 and 1936, Petre was a regular at all the big British races like the Brooklands 500 Miles and Brooklands Double 12 Hours Race|Double Twelve Hours]], plus sports car races at Donington Park and Crystal Palace. She partnered some big names, such as Dudley Benjafield and Prince Bira of Siam. She also drove in rallies and was an accomplished hillclimb driver, claiming the Ladies' Record at Shelsley Walsh twice.

In 1937 Petre travelled to South Africa for the Grand Prix motor racing season with her Riley. Here she befriended Bernd Rosemeyer, who was racing for Auto Union. Competing against him and other top drivers of the day, she drove in three Grands Prix, scoring a sixth place in the Grosvenor GP at Cape Town, but failing to finish the others. In September 1937, she went to France to race a "Grasshopper" Austin in the Paris to Nice rally.

She was driving for the works Austin team at Brooklands in September 1937 when her career was ended by a terrible accident. During practice for the 500 Kilometre race, Reg Parnell misjudged an overtaking move, lost speed, slid down the banking and hit her Austin Seven from behind. She crashed badly and was seriously injured. She never raced competitively again.

== Journalism ==
After this accident Petre turned to journalism. She wrote for the Kelmsley newspaper group, including the Daily Sketch.

On 20 January 1939, whilst covering the Monte Carlo rally, the car she was driving was involved in an accident in Amberieu-en-Bugey near Lyon in France. Her passenger, fellow journalist Reggie Empson was killed instantly and Petre was badly injured. Petre and the driver of the lorry were charged with manslaughter, but no further legal action was taken against Petre as she had returned to the UK and the Second World War had broken out. Reggie Empson's widow Stella Empson (née Pierres), a former actress known as the Modern Venus, started proceedings against Petre and after a long battle received an out of court settlement of £4,000.

During the Second World War Petre was a food writer, but then became motoring correspondent for The Daily Graphic magazine.

== Design career ==
In the early 1950s, Petre was employed by Austin as a "colour consultant" to suggest colours and combinations for the new A40/A50 Cambridge. Many of her ideas, such as bright blues and pinks and following the clothes fashions of the day using brown, dark red and rust were not adopted, but her ideas for the cars' interior colours and fabrics were adopted. Later Leonard Lord appointed her as a colour consultant to the British Motor Corporation, charged with brightening up the Austin image to appeal to women drivers. She also designed fabric patterns for the interior of the Mini.

== Later life ==
After her husband's death she lived alone in St John's Wood, London, then as a resident in a care home, Parkwood House, Camden, where she died on 10 August 1994. She was cremated at Golders Green crematorium.

== Complete 24-hour Le Mans results ==
Year	Result	Team	Car	Class
1934	13	Miss Dorothy Champney	Riley Nine Ulster Imp	1.1
1935	DNF	Riley Motor Company	Riley Nine MPH Six Racing	1.5
1937	DNF	R. Marsh	Austin 7	750
