= Derby (French car) =

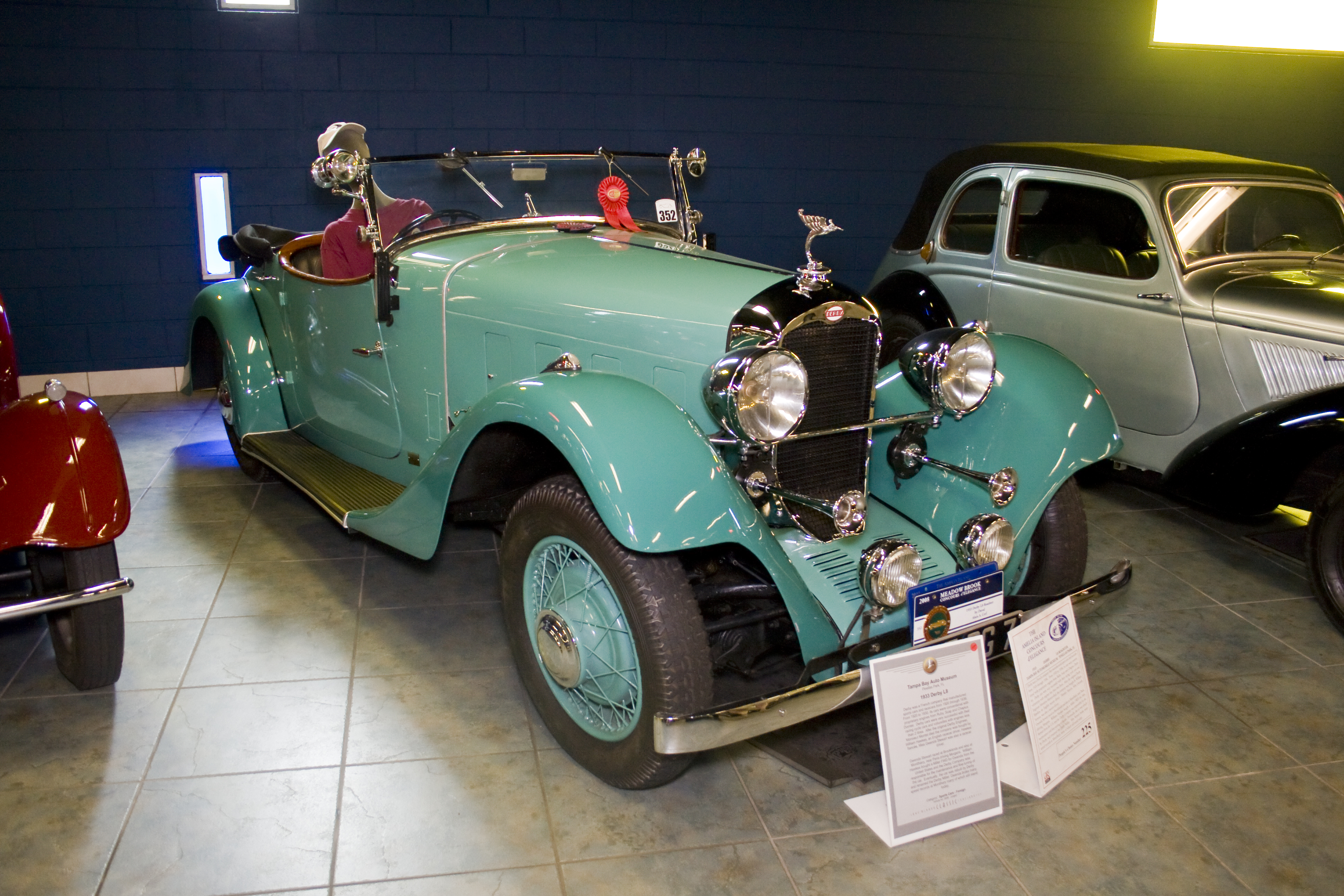
- Company type: Private
- Industry: Motoring
- Founded: 1921
- Defunct: 1936
- Headquarters: Courbevoie, Seine, France
- Products: Motor cars

Derby (/ˈdɑːrbi/ DAR-bee) is a former vintage era automobile maker based in Courbevoie, Seine, France.

== History ==
Derby was founded in Courbevoie by Bertrand Montet in 1921 to build voiturettes (cyclecars). These were powered by American vee-twin motorcycle engines, which were shortly replaced with Chapuis-Dorniers. In this form, it became a close copy of Citroën's 5CV ("five horsepower"); at £195 for the two-seat roadster, it was competitive with the contemporary Austin Seven (£225).

Shown at the 1923 Olympia Motor Show, Derby failed to gain many sales in Britain. It was there, however, the company displayed the 9 HP, a British-bodied Sports model with wire wheels, priced at £275. This followed the 1923 racer, which had competed at the Brooklands 200 mi (320 km) event. Production peaked at approximately 200 cars a year in 1925, falling to approximately 100 a year between 1928 and 1931.

By 1927, the car was being sold as a Vernon-Derby, taking the name of the marque's sales agent, Vernon Balls. The company offered the 8 HP with four-speed manual transmission in place of the previous three-speed. The next year, the lineup had expanded to three models: the 8 HP sports car (typically with a 1.1 L Chapuis-Dornier four) and two new sporty two-seater sixes, a 1.5 L sidevalve and the 14 HP. The 1.5-litre was replaced the next year by a smaller-displacement 12 HP sidevalve six. Derby showed a two-seater sportsman coupé at the 1930 London Motor Show, the 16 HP, with a 1,845 cc (112.6 cu in) six, which resembled the Bugattis of the era.

Like other marques of the period, Derby involved themselves in motor sport, with driver Douglas Hawkes's front wheel drive Miller with Derby parts (dubbed a Derby-Miller) acting as a testbed and promotional tool; that it was driven by Gwenda Stewart did not hurt publicity, either. Nor did Stewart's results: she took a Land Speed Racing 1.5-litre class record at Montlhéry in 1930, with a mile (1.6 km) at 118.13 mph (190.11 km/h). In 1934, she took another class record in a 1.7-litre Derby, at t 147.79 mph (237.84 km/h), which stood five years. Stewart would also enter the 1934 and 1935 Le Mans, with the recently introduced V8, falling out both times.

Derby ended production with unusual and sophisticated models: 12/50, introduced in 1931, with front wheel drive and fully independent suspension, and a 2-liter V8-powered front wheel drive model, which debuted 1933 (with a chassis price of £525). The company introduced a final rear drive Meadows-engined car before closing its doors in 1936.

== See also ==
- List of automobile manufacturers
- List of defunct automobile manufacturers
- List of automobile manufacturers of France
- Cyclecar
