= Roy Eccles =

Roy Hector Eccles
- Born: December 2, 1900 Neath, Wales
- Died: January 17, 1938 (aged 37) Staines-upon-Thames, England
- Years active: 1932 -1937

Roy Hector Eccles (2 December 1900 – 17 January 1938) was a British racing driver.

== Personal life ==
Eccles was born at Neath, Wales. His father was Herbert Eccles, a prominent businessman who was a founder and managing director of the Briton Ferry Steel Company.

Roy Eccles's first marriage produced two children and ended in divorce in 1931. In 1934 he married Marjorie Quick, a fellow racing enthusiast. He died on 17 January 1938 after suffering a stroke. He left an estate of £68,275.

Eccles had owned a farm at Bordsley Park near Redditch in Worcestershire but sold his property there and moved to Staines-upon-Thames in Sussex several years before his death.

== Racing career ==
Eccles began racing in 1932, after being introduced to the sport by his younger brother Lindsay Eccles, who raced in Bugatti automobiles. Roy Eccles regularly raced at the Brooklands and Donington Park tracks and in Europe.

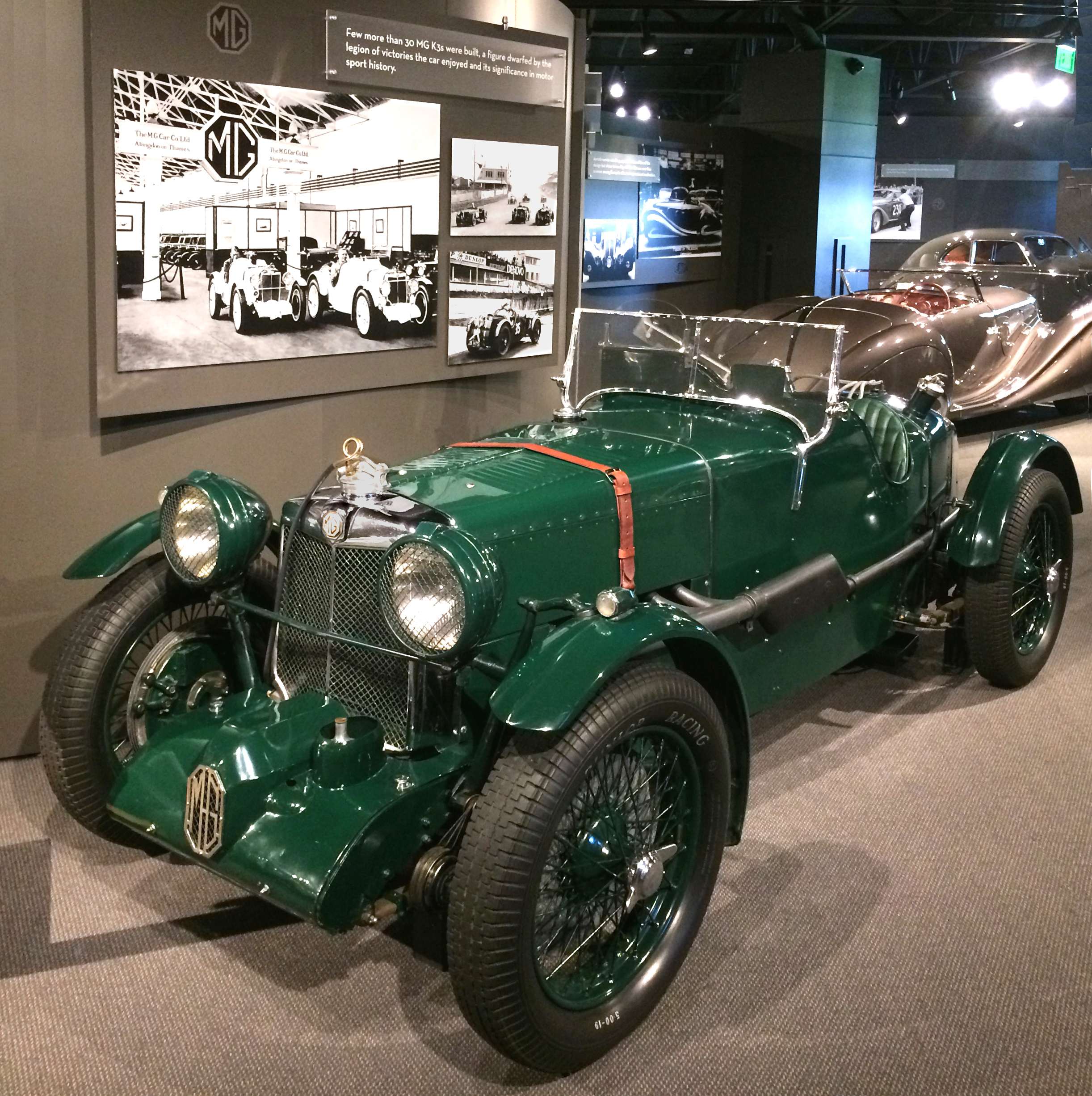
The MG K3 Magnette in 2019

In 1934 Roy Eccles and his co-driver Charlie Martin placed fourth overall, and first in the 751 - 1100 cm3 class, in the 24 Hours of Le Mans driving an MG K3 Magnette. Eccles and his wife Marjorie intended to drive a Singer Nine in the 1937 24 Hours of Le Mans, but he was replaced by Freddie de Clifford due to ill health. The car had to drop out after suffering a broken magneto.

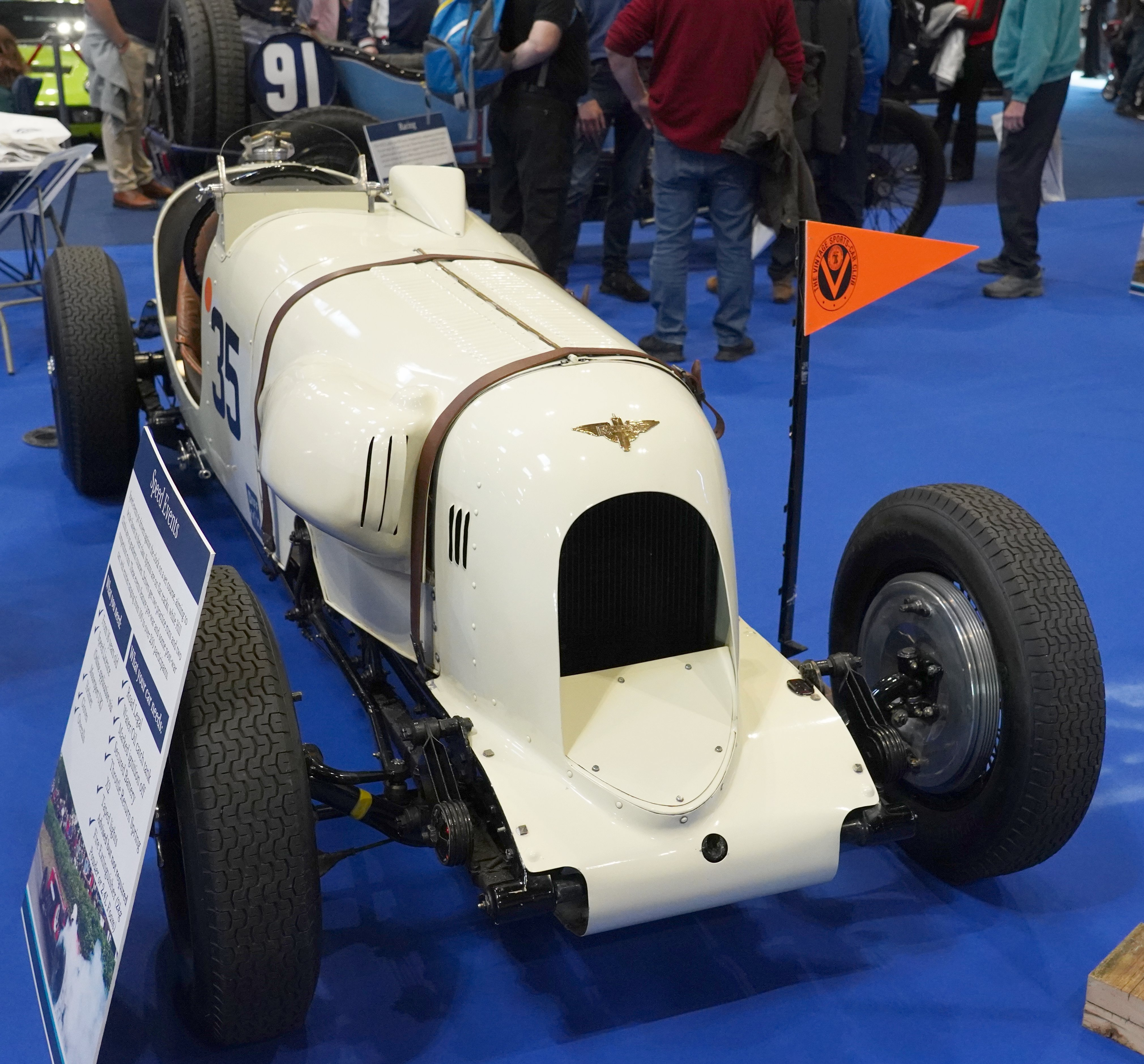
The Eccles Lagonda Rapier Special in 2025

In 1935 Eccles purchased a Lagonda Rapier which he had modified into a single seat racing car he called the "Eccles Supercharged Special". It first raced at the 1935 British Empire Trophy race at Brooklands. After more modifications, the car became known as a "Rapier Special". Both Roy and Marjorie Eccles drove the car in races at Brooklands, Donington, Shelsley Walsh, on the Isle of Man, and at Brighton.

Driving the Rapier, Marjorie Eccles narrowly escaped injury in a serious accident during the London Grand Prix at the Crystal Palace Circuit in 1937. As a consequence, Eccles announced at the end of the year that the couple would both retire from racing.
