= Bugatti Type 55 =

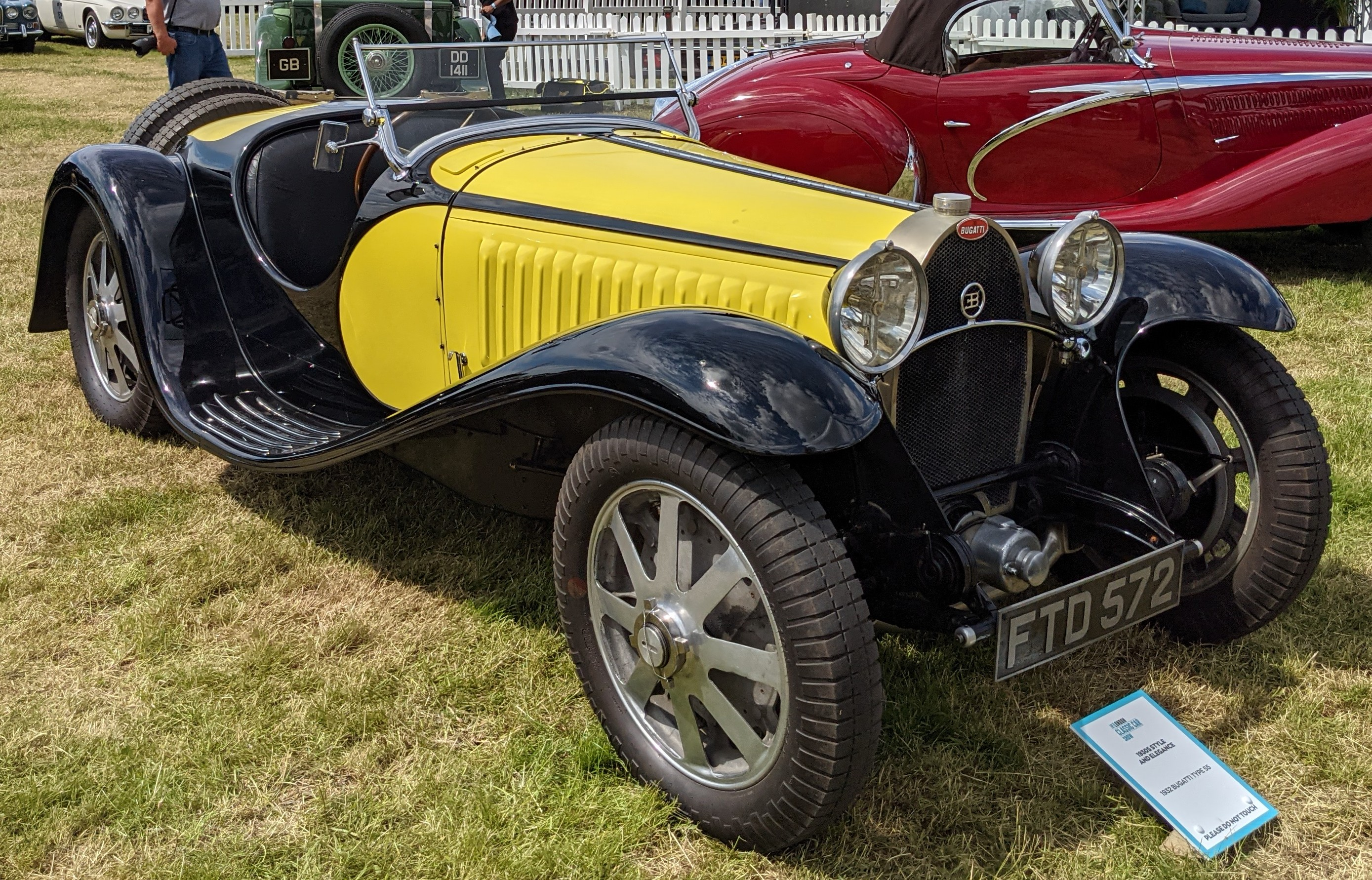
- Bugatti Type 55 wearing 2-seat roadster bodywork designed by Jean Bugatti

Overview
- Manufacturer: Bugatti
- Production: 1931–1935; 38 produced
- Model years: 1932–1935
- Assembly: France: Molsheim, Alsace (Usine Bugatti de Molsheim)
- Designer: Jean Bugatti

Body and chassis
- Layout: FR layout

Powertrain
- Engine: 2.3 L (2,300 cc) supercharged I8
- Transmission: 4-speed manual

Dimensions
- Wheelbase: 2,750 mm (108 in)
- Curb weight: 820 kg (1,810 lb)

Chronology
- Predecessor: Bugatti Type 51

The Bugatti Type 55 is a sports car produced by Bugatti from 1932 to 1935. It is a road-going version of the Type 51 Grand Prix car.

== History ==
The Type 55 was introduced at the 1931 Paris Motor Show and that particular car, chassis 55201, was subsequently purchased by the Duke of La Trémoille. It was available starting in 1932 and was produced until 1935, with the last car being delivered on July 30 of that year. 38 cars were produced in total. The majority of Type 55s had factory bodywork designed by Jean Bugatti, with 16 of the 38 wearing 2-seater roadster bodies and another 7 wearing coupe bodies, both of his design. Of the other 15, 11 were bodied by outside coachbuilders and the other four are unidentified. None of the factory bodied cars had doors which made them far less practical than the cars bodied by external coachbuilders, most of which did have doors. The Type 55 was often criticized by reviewers for its lack of practicality and for being deafening to ride in, due to a combination of noisy mechanicals and straight cut gears.

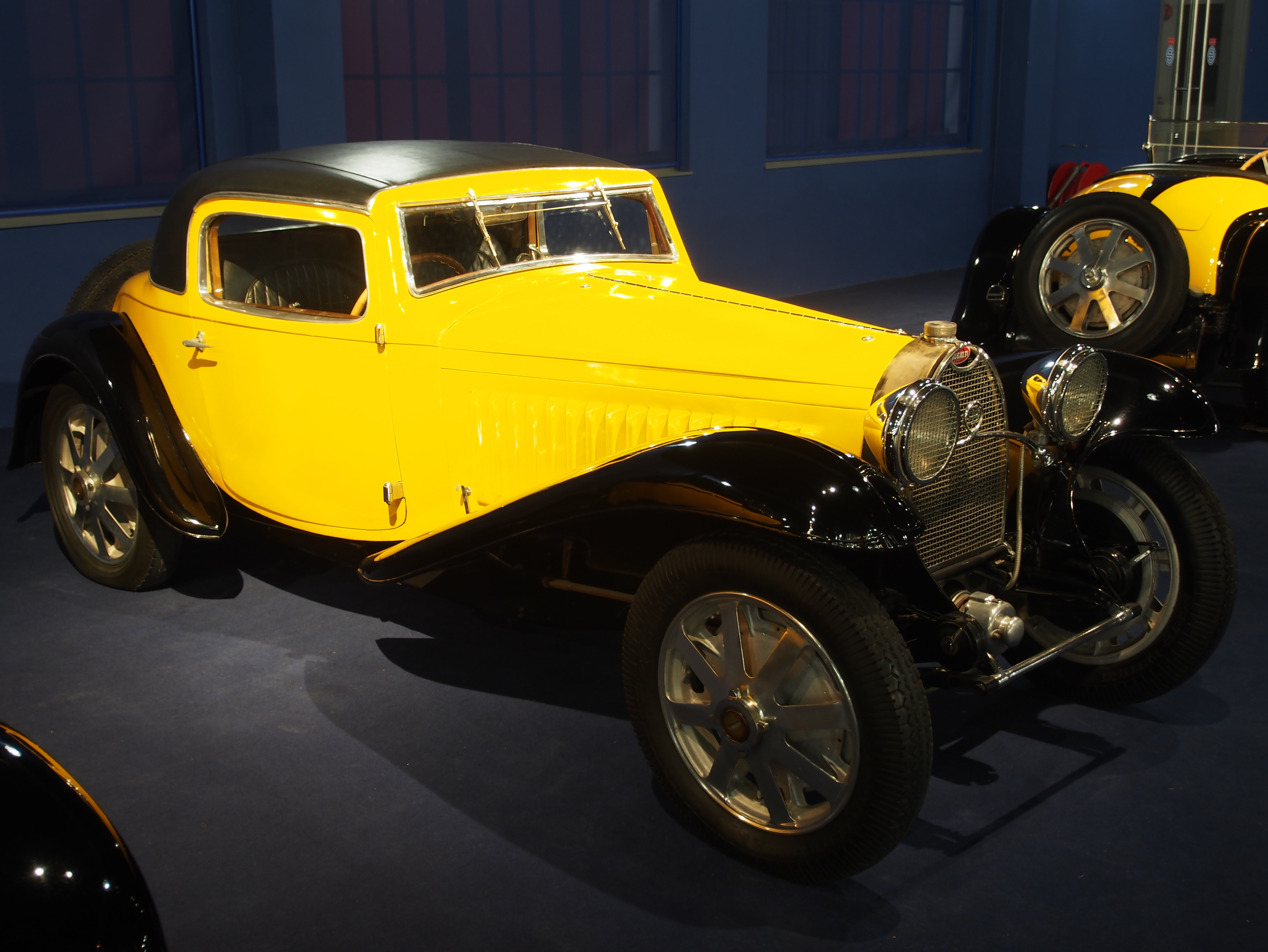
1932 Type 55 Coupé at the National Automobile Museum in Mulhouse

== Specifications ==
The Type 55 is powered by a detuned version of the Type 51's 2.3 L (2,300 cc; 140 cu in) 2-valve DOHC straight-8 engine with a Roots-type supercharger. It produces 130 hp (97 kW) at 5000 rpm. Differences from the Type 51's engine include the addition of a camshaft driven AC mechanical petrol pump and a modified supercharger drive. The compression ratio was also lowered by the use of a larger 9 mm (0.35 in) compression plate (the Type 51 used a 6 mm (0.24 in) plate). The car's 4-speed manual transmission came from the Type 49 touring car and featured straight cut gears. The car also wore the signature Bugatti eight-spoke aluminum wheels.

== Gallery ==
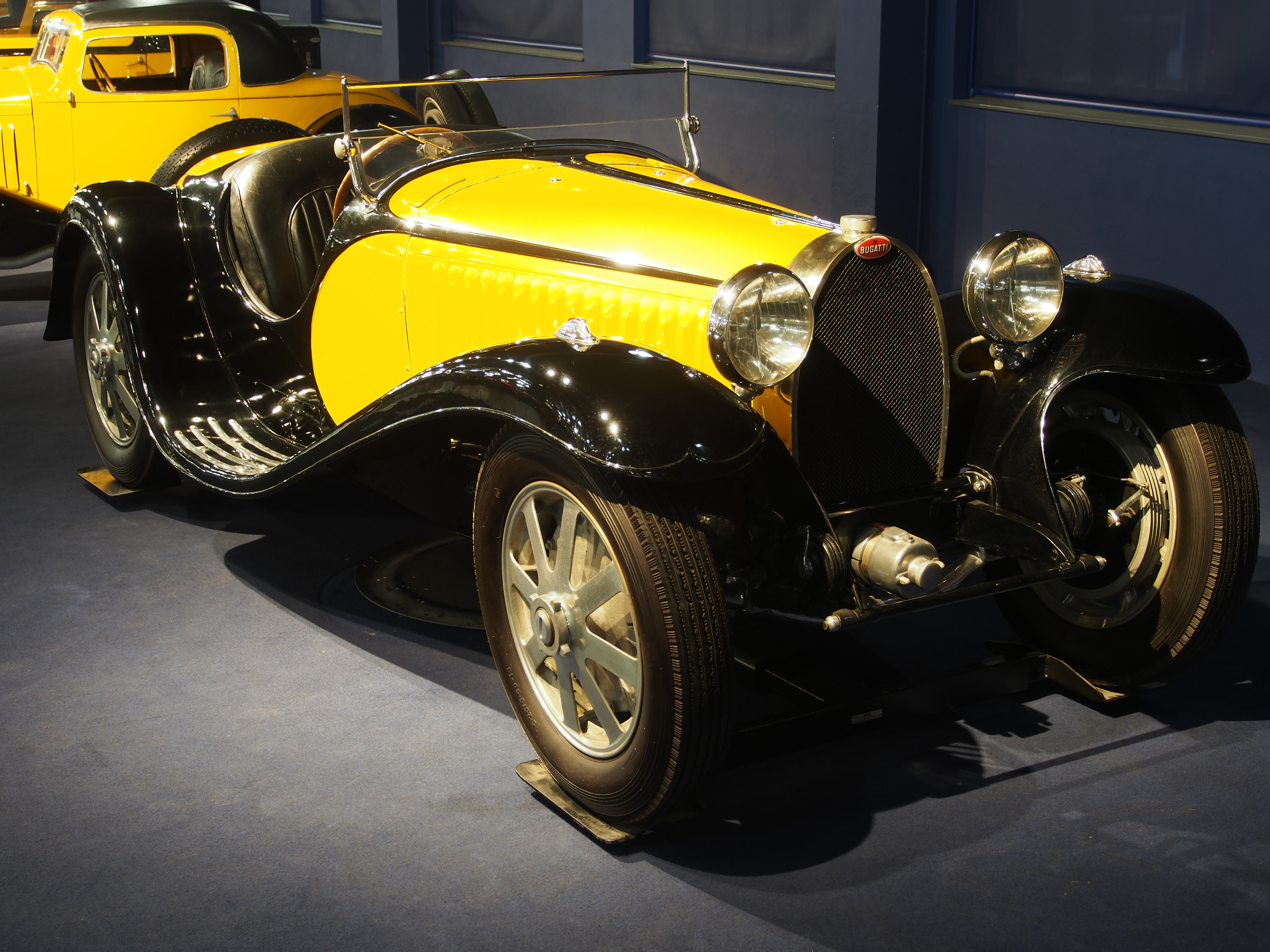
1934 Bugatti Type 55 Jean Bugatti roadster (chassis 55-237)

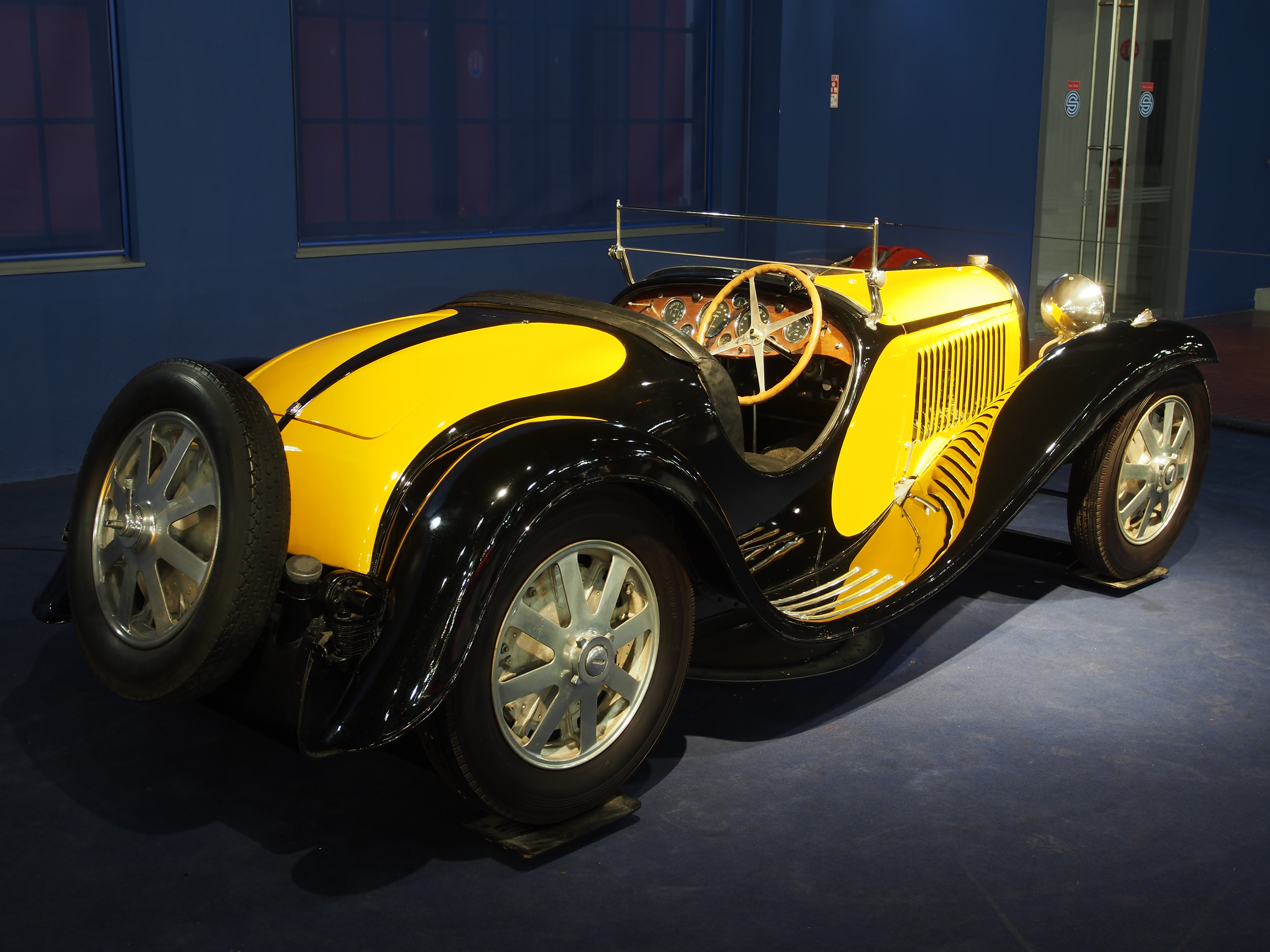
1934 Bugatti Type 55 Jean Bugatti roadster (chassis 55-237)

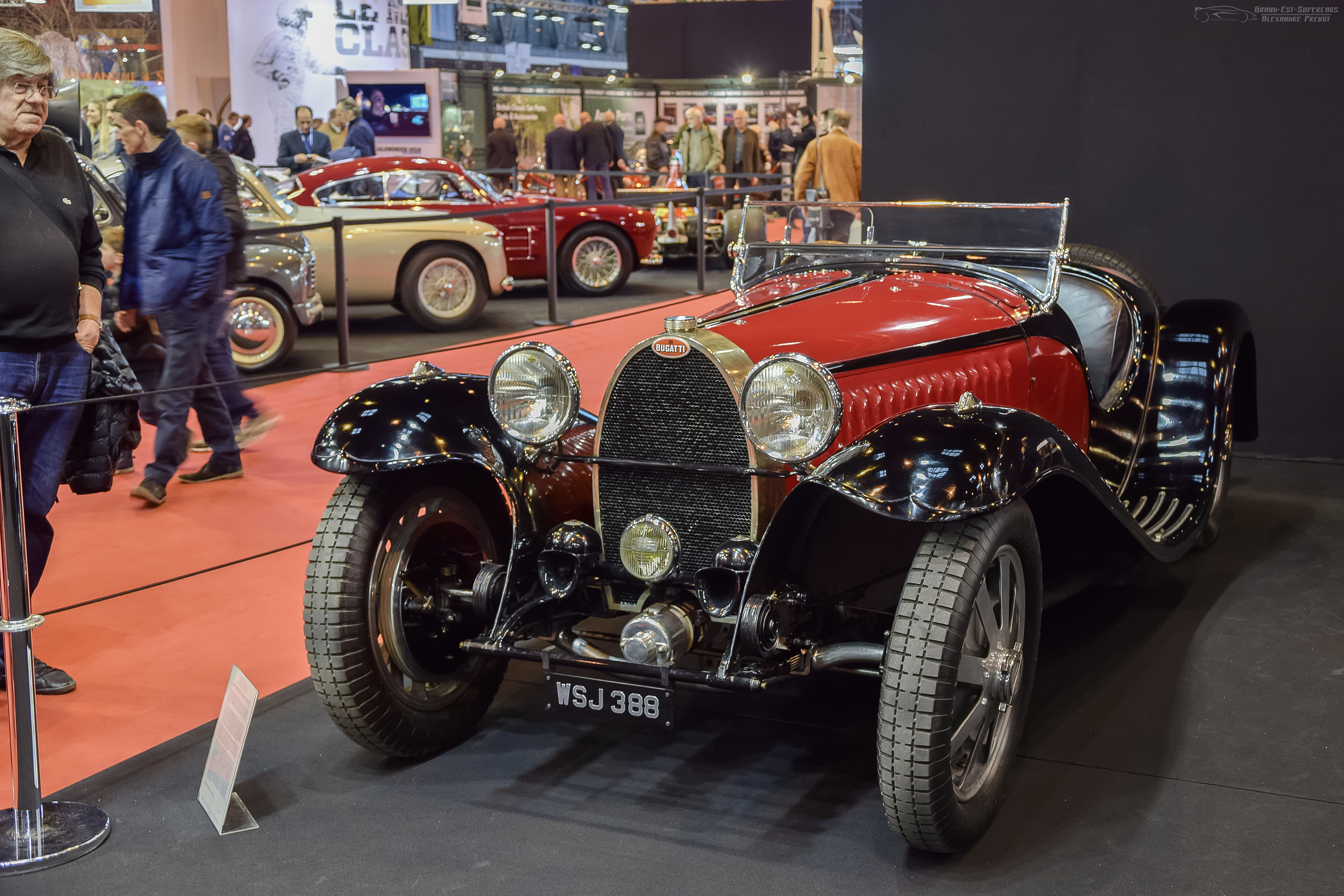
1933 Bugatti type 55 roadster (chassis 55-234)

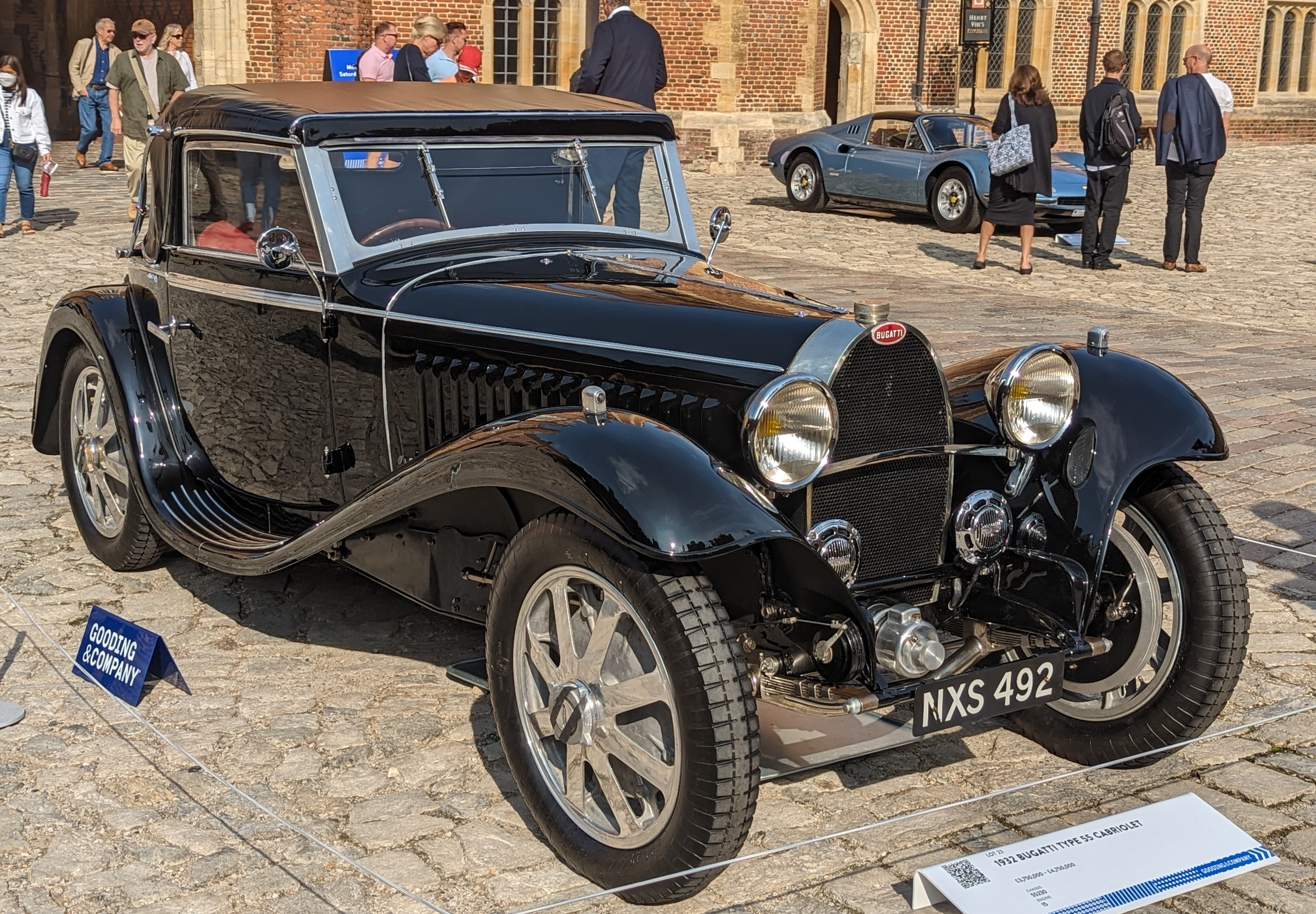
1932 Bugatti type 55 cabriolet (chassis 55-230)

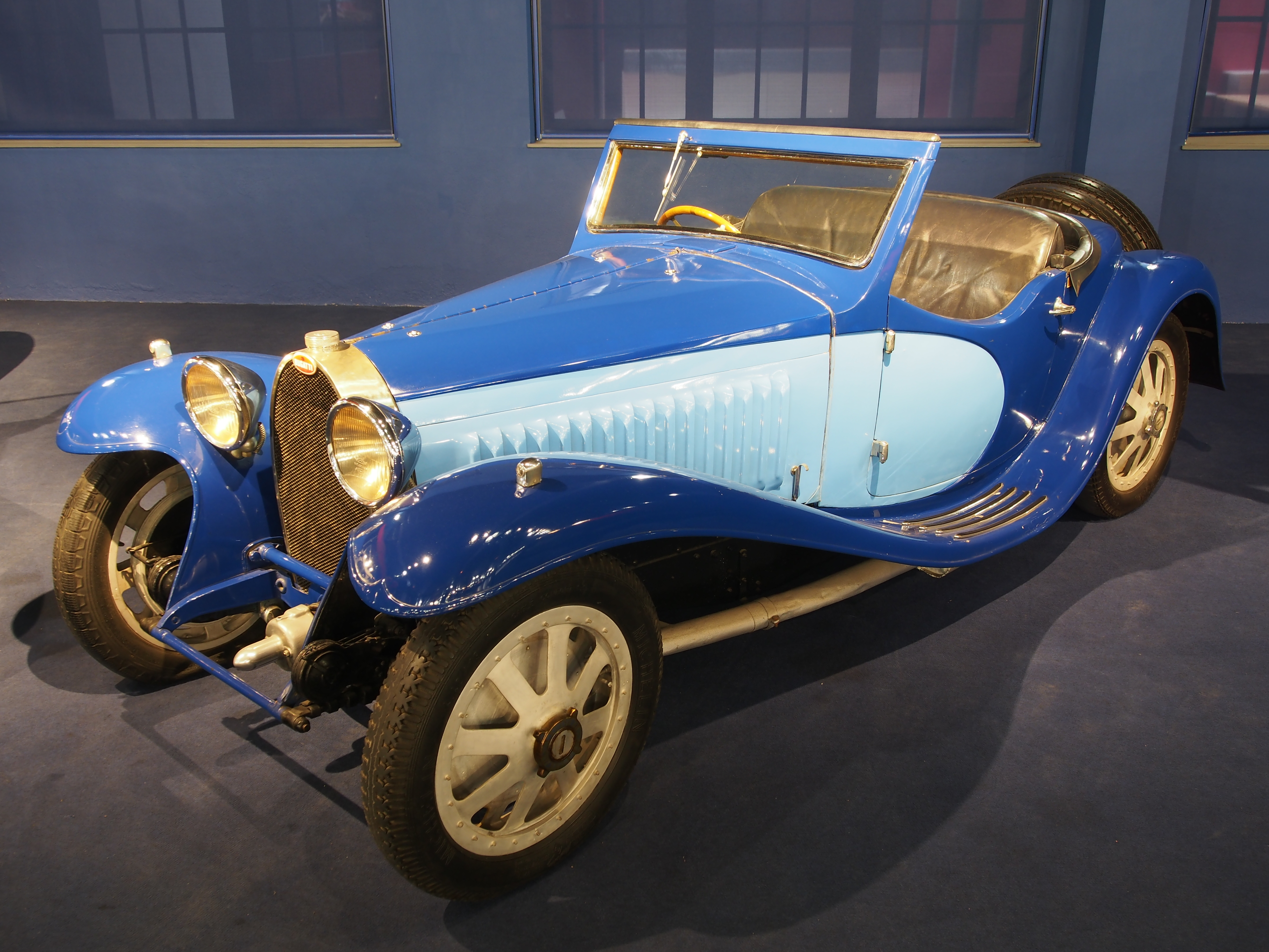
1933 Bugatti Type 55 Gangloff roadster (chassis 55-225)

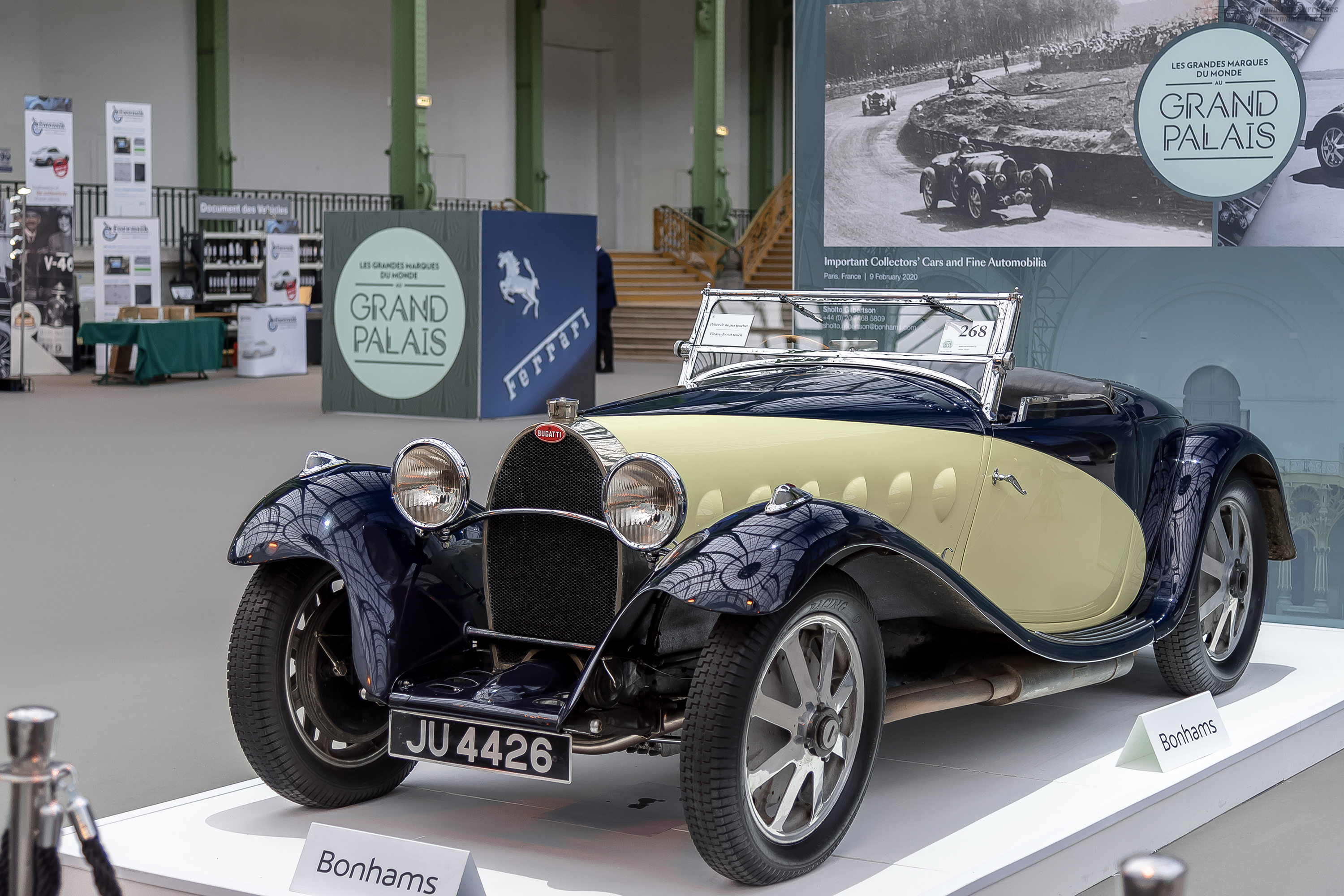
1931 Bugatti type 55 roadster Figoni (chassis 55-221)

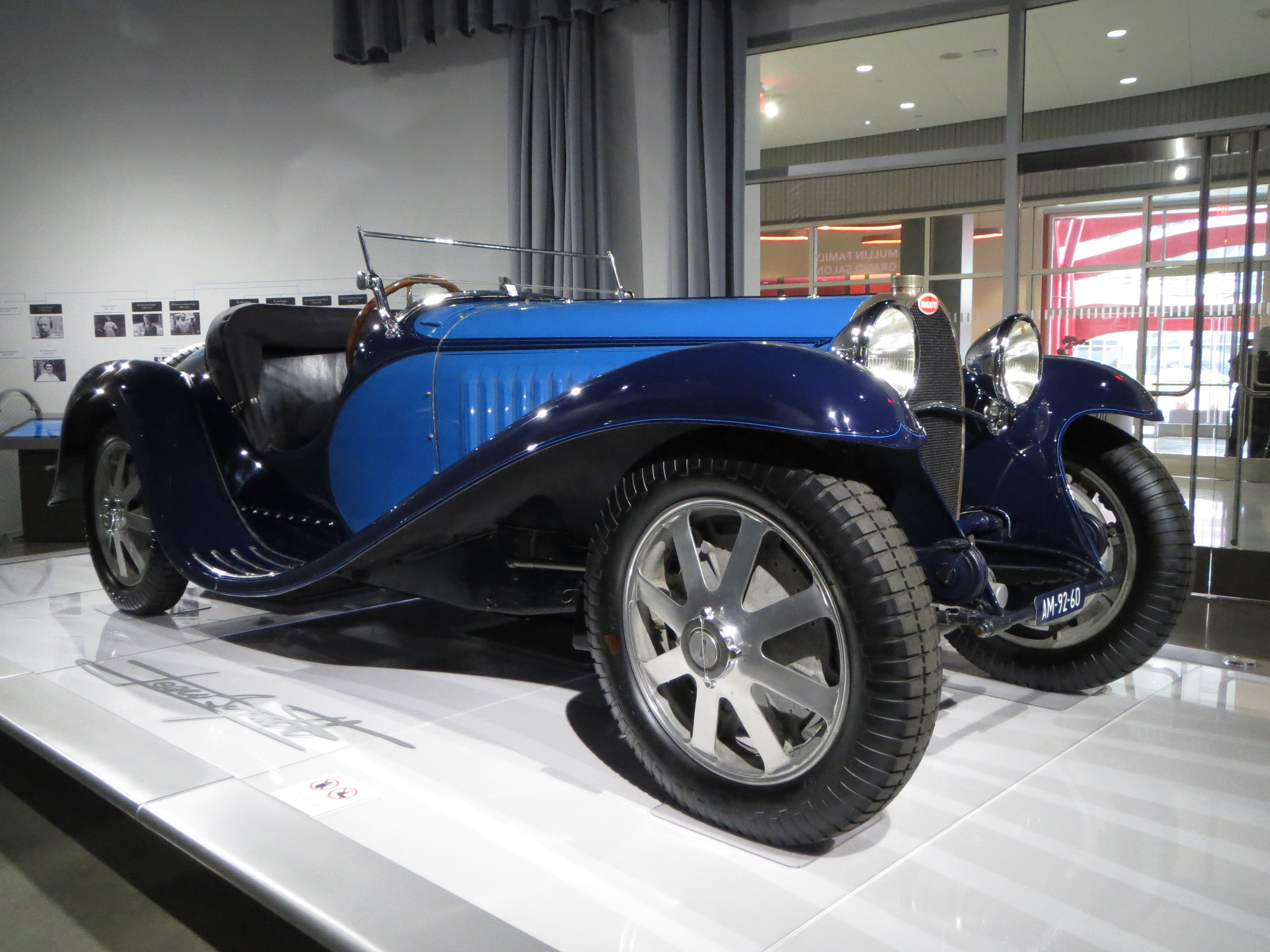
1932 Bugatti Type 55 Supersport roadster (chassis 55-208)

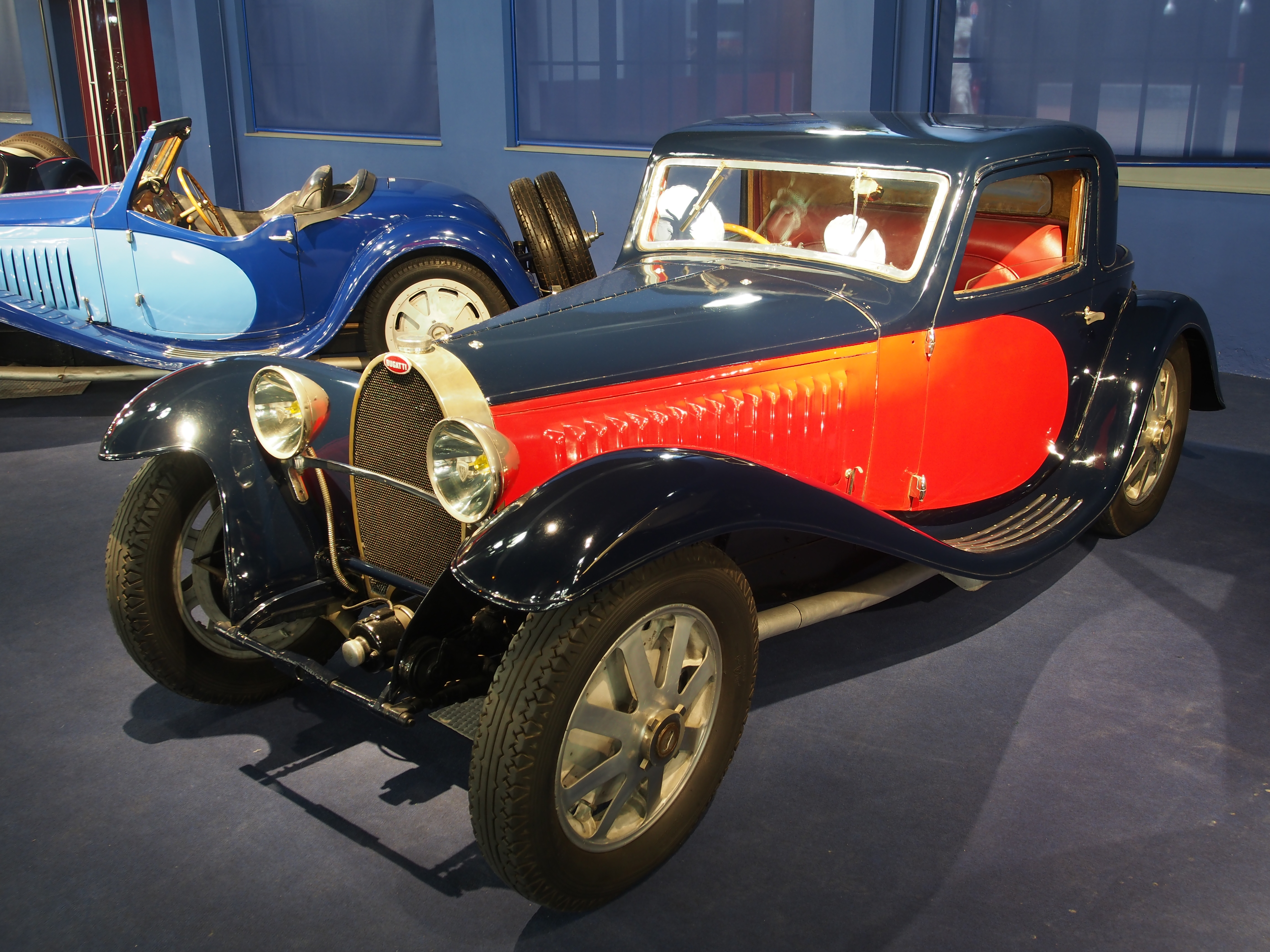
1932 Bugatti Type 55 Supersport coupe (chassis 55-212)

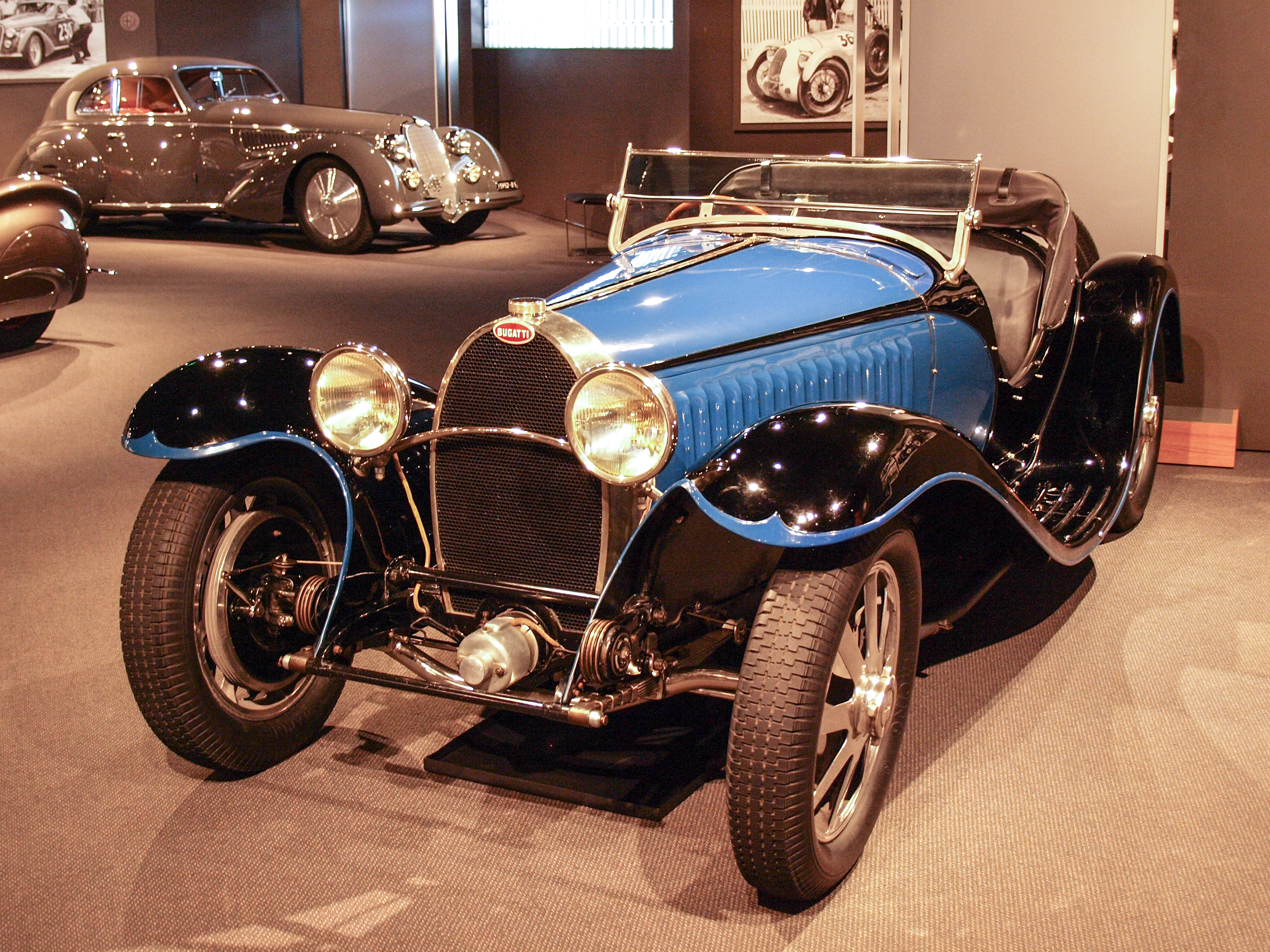
1933 Bugatti type 55 C roadster (chassis 55-211)

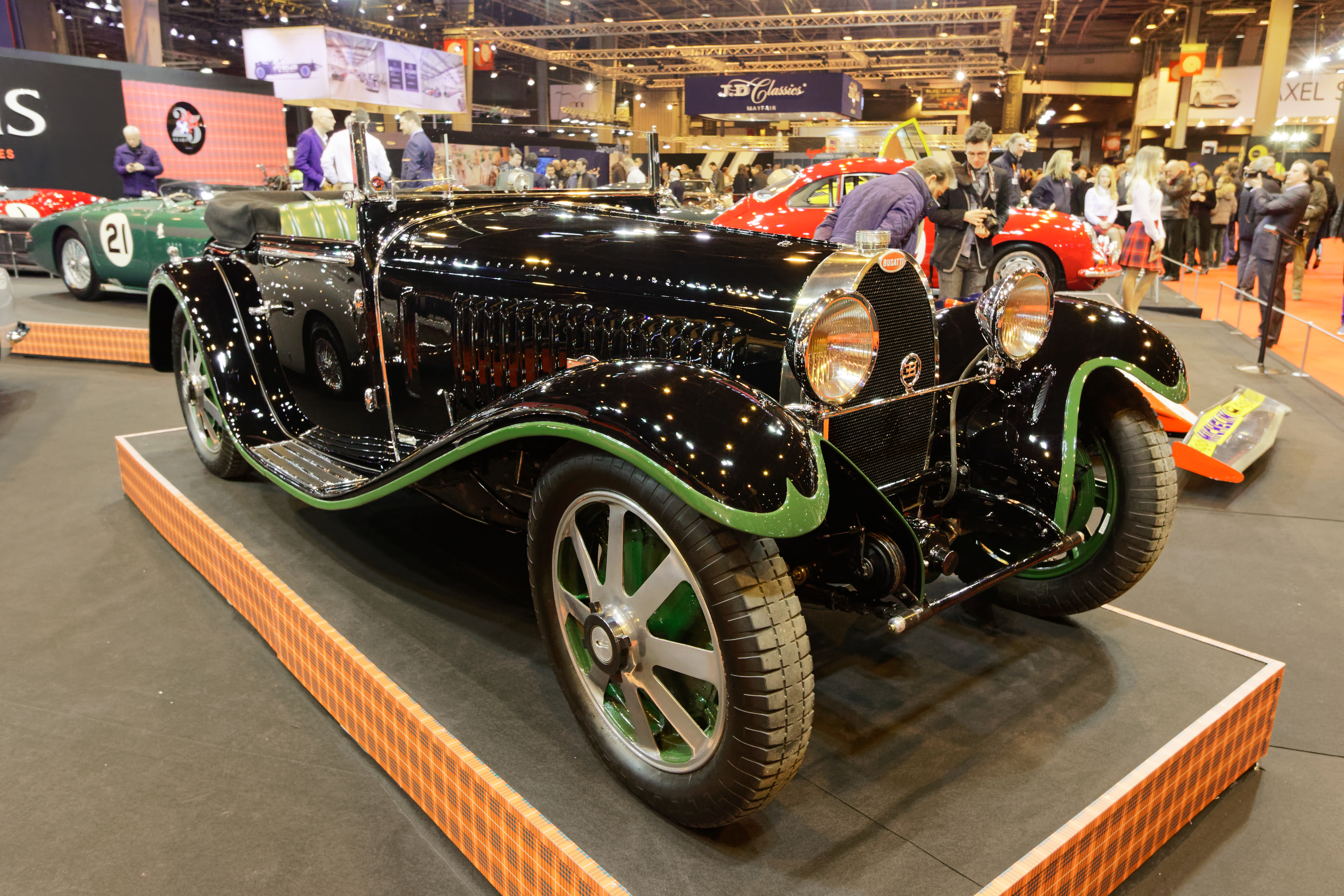
1932 Bugatti Type 55 Billeter & Cartier cabriolet (chassis 55-206)

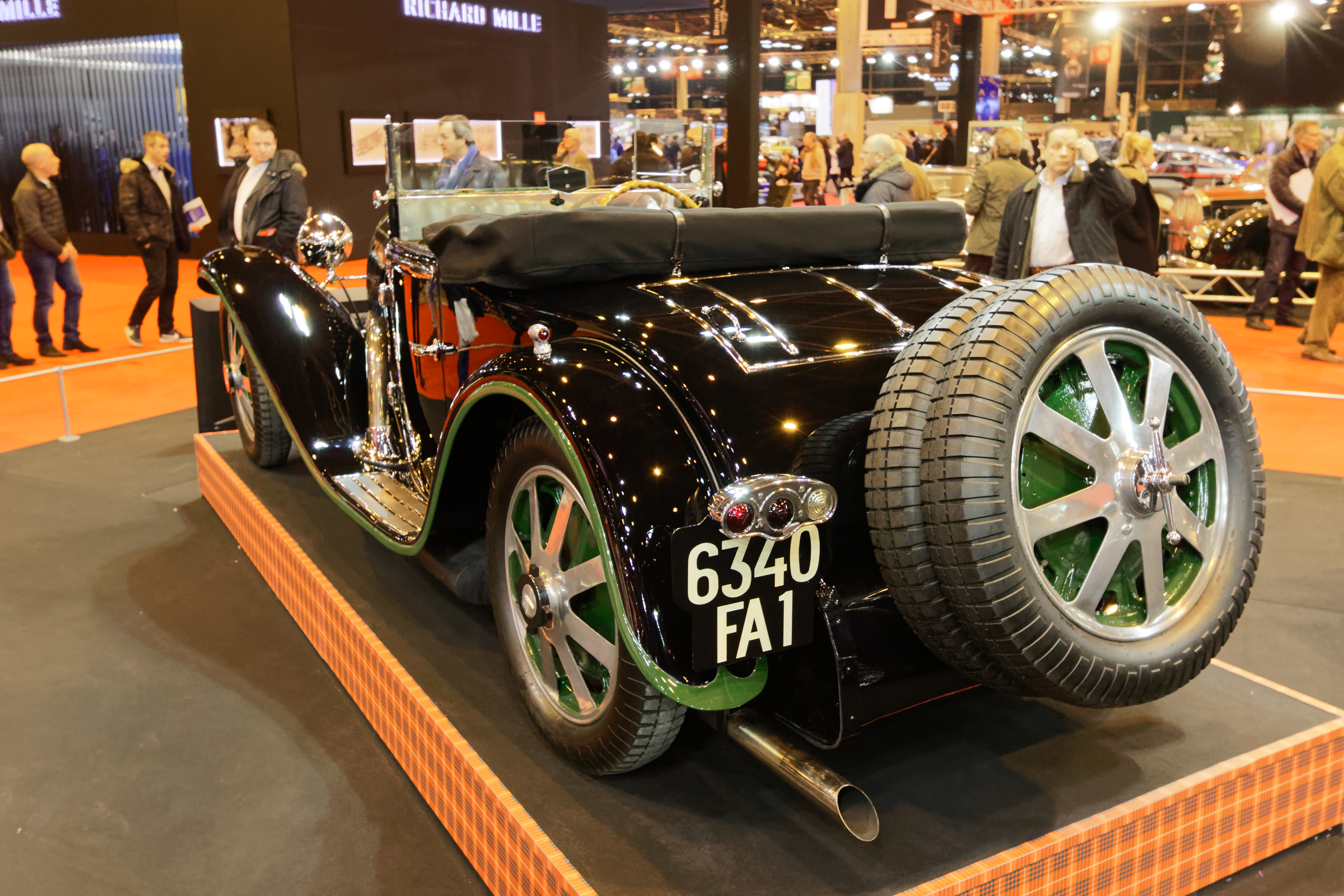
1932 Bugatti Type 55 Billeter & Cartier cabriolet (chassis 55-206)

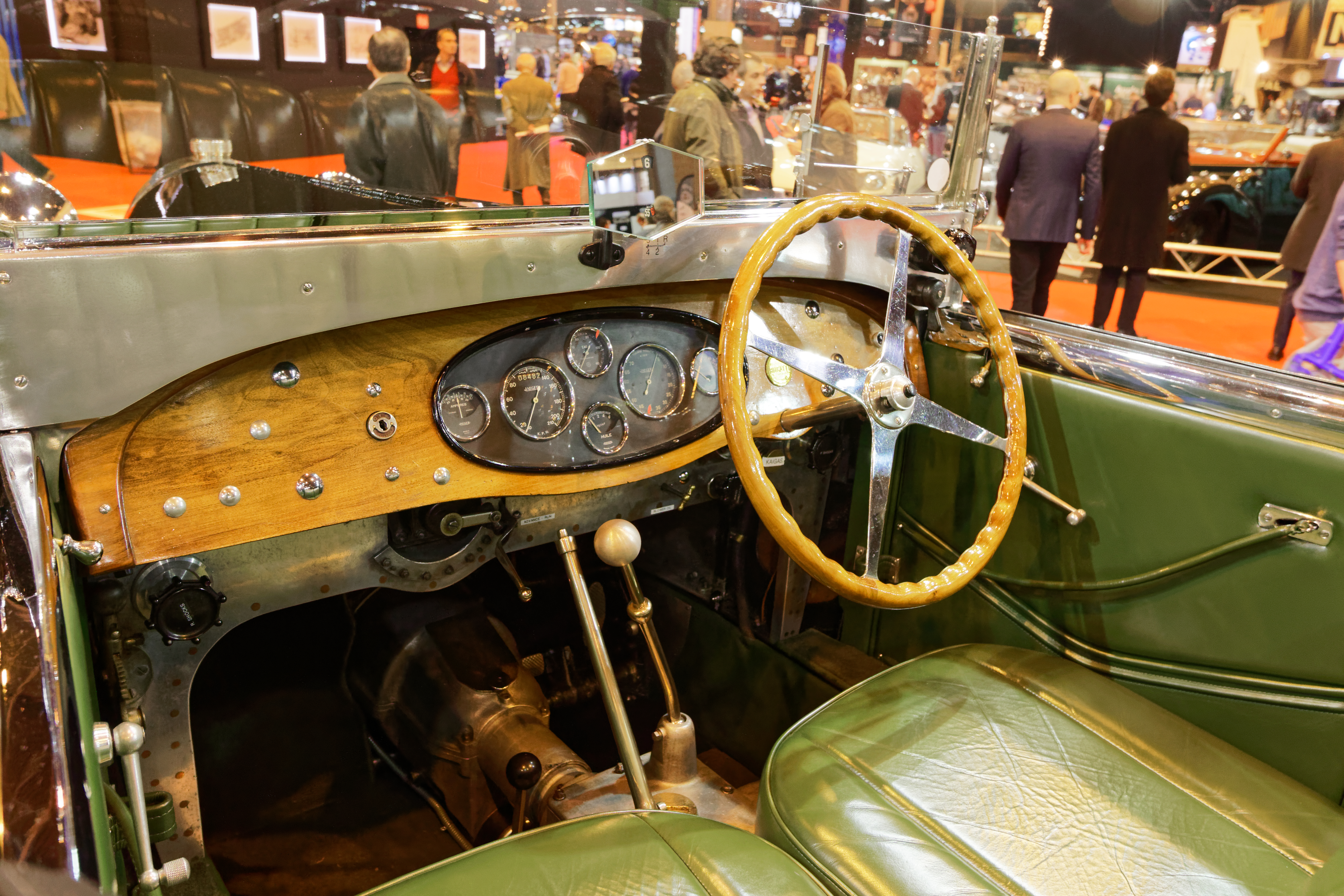
1932 Bugatti Type 55 Billeter & Cartier cabriolet (chassis 55-206)
