= 1936 Donington Grand Prix =

1936 motor race

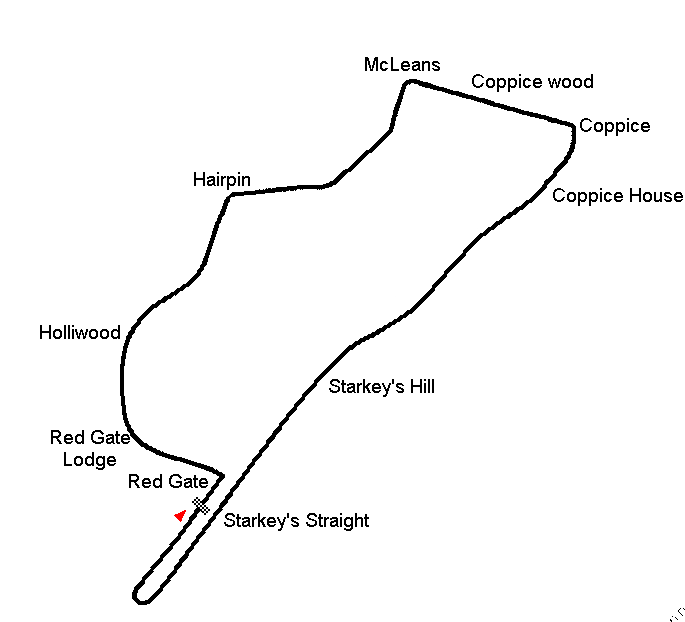

Race details
- Date: 3 October 1936
- Official name: II Donington Grand Prix
- Location: North West Leicestershire, England
- Course: Road course
- Course length: 4.107 km (2.552 miles)
- Distance: 120 laps, 492.8 km (306.2 miles)
- Weather: Dry

Pole position
| Driver | (New Zealand) Thomas Cholmondeley-Tapper (by ballot) | Maserati 8CM |

Podium
| First | (Switzerland) Hans Rüesch; (United Kingdom) Richard Seaman | Alfa Romeo |
| Second | (United Kingdom) Charlie Martin | Alfa Romeo |
| Third | (United Kingdom) Peter Whitehead; (United Kingdom) Peter Walker | E.R.A. |

The 1936 Donington Grand Prix was a non-championship Grand Prix that was held on 3 October 1936 at Donington Park in North West Leicestershire, England. It was the 39th race of the 1935 Grand Prix season. The race, which was 120 laps, was won by Hans Ruesch and Richard Seaman, who both drove 60 laps each.

The race was also the final event for the 1936 British Racing Drivers Club Gold Star championship; going into the race, B. Bira led the table, and only Richard Seaman could catch him. Seaman however had to win and to hope that Bira did not score a point, with fifth place being worth one point.

== Entries ==
| No. | Driver | Entrant | Car |
|---|---|---|---|
| 1 | (United Kingdom) Cyril Mervyn White | C. Mervyn White | Bugatti Type 51 |
| 2 | (New Zealand) Thomas Cholmondeley-Tapper | T. Cholmondeley-Tapper | Maserati 8CM |
| 3 | (United Kingdom) Antony Powys-Lybbe | A. Powys-Lybbe | Alfa Romeo 8C 2300 |
| 4 | (United Kingdom) Philip Jucker | P. Jucker | Alta IFS |
| 5 | (United Kingdom) Percy Maclure | P. Maclure | Riley 2000/6 |
| 6 | (United Kingdom) Reg Parnell | R. Parnell | MG Magnette |
| 7 | (United Kingdom) Hector Dobbs | Denis Scribbans | E.R.A. R9B |
| 8 | (United Kingdom) Peter Whitehead | P. Whitehead | E.R.A. R10B |
| 9 | (United Kingdom) Darcy Taylor | D. Taylor | Bugatti Type 51 |
| 10 | (United Kingdom) Charlie Martin | C. Martin | Alfa Romeo Tipo B |
| 11 | (United Kingdom) Thomas Clarke | T. Clarke | Delahaye 135S |
| 12 | (Switzerland) Hans Rüesch | H. Rüesch | Alfa Romeo 8C35 |
| 14 | (United Kingdom) Douglas Briault | D. Briault | ERA R6B |
| 15 | (United Kingdom) Reggie Tongue | R. Tongue | ERA R11B |
| 16 | (United Kingdom) Arthur Dobson | Arthur Dobson | ERA R7B |
| 17 | (United Kingdom) Ian Connell | I. Connell | Alfa Romeo 8C 2300 |
| 18 | (Thailand) B. Bira | Prince Chula | Maserati 8CM |
| 19 | (United Kingdom) Austin Dobson | Austin Dobson | Alfa Romeo 8C 2300 |
| 20 | (Luxembourg) Pablo Curtis | P. Curtis | Salmson L4 |
| 21 | (United Kingdom) Tommy Wisdom | Alan Selborne | Delahaye 135S |
| 22 | (United States) Laury Schell | Alan Selborne | Delahaye 135S |
| 23 | (France) René Carrière | Alan Selborne | Delahaye 135S |
| 24 | (Switzerland) Christian Kautz | C. Kautz | Maserati 4CM |

== Non-participants ==
A number of reserve drivers were nominated, but did not get to take a turn at the wheel. The most notable of these was Eileen Ellison, who was reserve to Cholmondeley-Tapper, and who took part in official practice.

=== Pablo Curtis ===
The only entry which did not turn up was that of Pablo Curtis, an obscure driver from Luxembourg who was claimed to be a national champion, but who had also withdrawn from the Albi Grand Prix and Shelsley Walsh hill climb events earlier in the season. His only actual appearances seem to have been a handful of 1936 events, including the 24 hour Bol d'Or (in which he finished 5th in the 1.1 litre racing category, in his blown Salmson, despite retiring in the 16th hour) and a class victory in a hillclimb at Ars-la Châtre, where a track was later built.

== Qualifying ==
The grid was decided by ballot rather than practice times; Seaman had been fastest in practice, setting a time of 2m 02, four seconds faster than Rüesch, who was in turn just under a second faster than Bira. The cars lined up on the grid in rows of 4, albeit asymmetrically, alternating between two groups of two and a middle group of two with cars on left and right.

== Race ==
The event proved to be more successful than the preceding year, with a much bigger entry, and more overseas interest. The race was also broadcast over radio from 4.15pm, commentary coming from F. J. Findon of the Light Car magazine and motorcycle racer Graham Walker, father of future commentator Murray. Up to 15,000 spectators attended in autumn sunshine and Cholmondeley-Tapper, taking advantage of the fortuitous grid draw, led the first lap as favourite Bira stalled. By the time Bira got going, he had lost nearly 2 laps, and Rüesch took the lead after 4 laps - which he would in fact never lose. By 20 laps his lead over Charlie Martin and Cholmondeley-Tapper was over a minute, and at half-distance - when he handed over to Seaman - the lead over Martin and Whitehead was nearly a lap. After Seaman brought the Alfa home, the competitors were allowed to continue for 10 minutes in order to complete the race distance, Arthur Dobson completing the 120 laps just within the time limit, and the other runners were flagged off; Bira's recovery drive to fifth meant that he pipped Seaman to the Gold Star title.

The main incident in the race was caused by Arthur Dobson's oil filler cap coming loose; this led to a spillage of oil around the circuit, a number of cars going off (including his brother Austin), and the damage from the off-course moment caused Tapper's steering to break. The last runner was shared by Kaye Don and Tommy Wisdom; it was Don's first appearance in a race in two years, and he took over from Wisdom at half-distance, but - with second gear missing - could not make the race pace, and the transmission trouble cost Delahaye the team prize to E.R.A.

== Race results ==
| Pos. | No. | Driver(s) | Car | Laps | Time/Retired |
|---|---|---|---|---|---|
| 1 | 12 | (Switzerland) Hans Rüesch (United Kingdom) Richard Seaman | Alfa Romeo 8C35 | 120 | 4:25:22 |
| 2 | 10 | (United Kingdom) Charlie Martin | Alfa Romeo Tipo B | 120 | 4:28:25 |
| 3 | 8 | (United Kingdom) Peter Whitehead (United Kingdom) Peter Walker | ERA R10B | 120 | 4:31:35 |
| 4 | 15 | (United Kingdom) Reggie Tongue | ERA R11B | 120 | 4:32:29 |
| 5 | 18 | (Thailand) "B. Bira" | Maserati 8CM | 120 | 4:33:19 |
| 6 | 16 | (United Kingdom) Arthur Dobson | ERA R7B | 120 | 4:35:06 |
| 7 | 3 | (United Kingdom) Antony Powys-Lybbe | Alfa Romeo 8C 2300 Monza | 118 | Flagged off |
| 8 | 23 | (France) René Carrière (United Kingdom) Alan Selborne | Delahaye 135S | 118 | Flagged off |
| 9 | 17 | (United Kingdom) Ian Connell (United Kingdom) Kenneth Evans | Alfa Romeo 8C 2300 Monza | 115 | Flagged off |
| 10 | 19 | (United Kingdom) Austin Dobson (United Kingdom) Andrew Leitch | Alfa Romeo Tipo B | 115 | Flagged off |
| 11 | 11 | (United Kingdom) Thomas Clarke | Delahaye 135S | 114 | Flagged off |
| 12 | 22 | (United States) Laury Schell | Delahaye 135S | 114 | Flagged off |
| 13 | 14 | (United Kingdom) Douglas Briault | ERA R6B | 113 | Flagged off |
| 14 | 9 | (United Kingdom) Darcy Taylor | Bugatti Type 51 | 112 | Flagged off |
| 15 | 21 | (United Kingdom) Kaye Don (United Kingdom) Tommy Wisdom | Delahaye 135S | 100 | Flagged off |
| ret | 7 | (United Kingdom) Hector Dobbs (United Kingdom) Denis Scribbans | ERA R9B | 67 | Engine |
| ret | 6 | (United Kingdom) Reg Parnell | MG K3 Magnette | 58 | Axle shaft |
| ret | 24 | (Switzerland) Christian Kautz | Maserati 4CM | 55 | Piston |
| ret | 2 | (New Zealand) Thomas Cholmondeley-Tapper | Maserati 8CM | 42 | Steering |
| ret | 1 | (United Kingdom) Cyril Mervyn-White | Bugatti Type 53 | 23 | Propellor shaft |
| ret | 4 | (United Kingdom) Philip Jucker | Alta IFS | 23 | Oil pressure |
| ret | 5 | (United Kingdom) Percy Maclure | Riley 2000 | 1 | Big end |

Grand Prix Race
1936 Grand Prix season
| Previous race: 1935 Donington Grand Prix | Donington Grand Prix | Next race: 1937 Donington Grand Prix |
