= 1938 Grand Prix season =

Sixth AIACR European Championship season

1938 AIACR European Championship

Seasons
- ← 1937 1939 →

1938 Grand Prix season

Seasons
- ← 1937 1939 →

The 1938 Grand Prix season was the sixth AIACR European Championship season. It saw the introduction of new rules that limited engine size to 3 liter (if supercharged), and added about 100 kg weight, thus some less competitive cars automatically complied to the new rules. The Mercedes-Benz W125 and Auto Union C with their large engines in low weight chassis had to be retired, and Mercedes-Benz W154 and Auto Union D appeared during the season.

The championship was once again won by Rudolf Caracciola, driving for the Mercedes-Benz team. Caracciola won only one of the four events that counted towards the championship, but always finished on the podium.

== Teams and drivers ==
The following teams and drivers competed in the 1938 AIACR European Championship.

Entrant	Constructor	Chassis	Engine	Driver	Rounds
(France) Talbot Darracq	Talbot	T150C	Talbot 4.5 L6	(France) Philippe Étancelin	1
(France) Talbot Darracq	Talbot	T150C	Talbot 4.5 L6	(France) René Carrière	1
(France) Societé des Études et de Fabrication d’Automobile de Course	SEFAC	GP	SEFAC 3.0 U8 s	(France) Eugène Chaboud	1
(Germany) Auto Union AG	Auto Union	C/D; D	Auto Union 3.0 V12 s	(Switzerland) Christian Kautz	1, 3-4
(Germany) Auto Union AG	Auto Union	C/D; D	Auto Union 3.0 V12 s	(Germany) Hermann Paul Müller	All
(Germany) Auto Union AG	Auto Union	C/D; D	Auto Union 3.0 V12 s	(Germany) Rudolf Hasse	1-2
(Germany) Auto Union AG	Auto Union	C/D; D	Auto Union 3.0 V12 s	(Italy) Tazio Nuvolari	2-4
(Germany) Auto Union AG	Auto Union	C/D; D	Auto Union 3.0 V12 s	(Germany) Hans Stuck	2-4
(France) Automobiles Ettore Bugatti	Bugatti	T59/50B3	Bugatti 3.0 L8 s	(France) Jean-Pierre Wimille	1
(Germany) Daimler-Benz AG	Mercedes-Benz	W154	Mercedes-Benz M154 3.0 V12 s	(Germany) Rudolf Caracciola	All
(Germany) Daimler-Benz AG	Mercedes-Benz	W154	Mercedes-Benz M154 3.0 V12 s	(Germany) Manfred von Brauchitsch	All
(Germany) Daimler-Benz AG	Mercedes-Benz	W154	Mercedes-Benz M154 3.0 V12 s	(Germany) Hermann Lang	All
(Germany) Daimler-Benz AG	Mercedes-Benz	W154	Mercedes-Benz M154 3.0 V12 s	(United Kingdom) Richard Seaman	2-4
(Germany) Daimler-Benz AG	Mercedes-Benz	W154	Mercedes-Benz M154 3.0 V12 s	(Germany) Walter Bäumer	2-3
(France) Écurie Bleue Delahaye	Delahaye	145	Delahaye 4.5 V12	(France) René Dreyfus	2-3
(France) Écurie Bleue Delahaye	Delahaye	145	Delahaye 4.5 V12	(Italy) Franco Comotti	2
(France) Écurie Bleue Delahaye	Delahaye	145	Delahaye 4.5 V12	(France) "Raph"	3
(Italy) Alfa Corse	Alfa Romeo	Tipo 312; Tipo 316	Alfa Romeo 3.0 V12 s Alfa Romeo 3.0 V16 s	(Italy) Giuseppe Farina	2-4
(Italy) Alfa Corse	Alfa Romeo	Tipo 312; Tipo 316	Alfa Romeo 3.0 V12 s Alfa Romeo 3.0 V16 s	(Italy) Clemente Biondetti	2, 4
(Italy) Alfa Corse	Alfa Romeo	Tipo 312; Tipo 316	Alfa Romeo 3.0 V12 s Alfa Romeo 3.0 V16 s	(France) Jean-Pierre Wimille	3-4
(Italy) Alfa Corse	Alfa Romeo	Tipo 312; Tipo 316	Alfa Romeo 3.0 V12 s Alfa Romeo 3.0 V16 s	(Italy) Piero Taruffi	4
(Italy) Scuderia Torino	Alfa Romeo	Tipo 308; 8C 2900	Alfa Romeo 3.0 L8 s Alfa Romeo 2.9 L8 s	(Italy) Piero Taruffi	2-3
(Italy) Scuderia Torino	Alfa Romeo	Tipo 308; 8C 2900	Alfa Romeo 3.0 L8 s Alfa Romeo 2.9 L8 s	(Italy) Pietro Ghersi	2, 4
(Switzerland) Écurie Du Puy de Graffenried	Maserati	6C 34	Maserati 3.0 L6 s	(Switzerland) Toulo de Graffenried	2-3
(Hungary) Count Ernõ Festetics	Alfa Romeo	P3	Alfa Romeo 3.0 L8 s	(Hungary) Ernõ Festetics	2
(United Kingdom) A. B. Hyde	Maserati	8CM	Maserati 3.0 L8 s	(United Kingdom) A. B. Hyde	2
(Switzerland) Écurie Helvetia	Maserati	6CM	Maserati 1.5 L6 s	(Germany) Herbert Berg	2
(Germany) Paul Pietsch	Maserati	6CM	Maserati 1.5 L6 s	(Germany) Paul Pietsch	2
(Italy) Renato Balestrero	Alfa Romeo	Tipo 308	Alfa Romeo 3.0 L8 s	(Italy) Renato Balestrero	2
(Italy) Renato Balestrero	Alfa Romeo	Tipo 308	Alfa Romeo 3.0 L8 s	(Italy) Vittorio Belmondo	4
(Italy) Scuderia Ambrosiana	Maserati	6CM	Maserati 1.5 L6 s	(Italy) Franco Cortese	2
(Italy) Giovanni Minozzi	Alfa Romeo	Monza	Alfa Romeo 2.6 L8 s	(Italy) Giovanni Minozzi	3
(Italy) Emilio Romano	Alfa Romeo	Monza	Alfa Romeo 2.6 L8 s	(Italy) Emilio Romano	3
(Italy) Squadra Subauda	Maserati	8CM	Maserati 3.0 L8 s	(Italy) Edoardo Teagno	3
(Italy) Squadra Subauda	Maserati	8CM	Maserati 3.0 L8 s	(Thailand) Prince Bira	3
(Switzerland) Auto-Agence SA	Maserati	8CM	Maserati 3.0 L8 s	(Switzerland) Adolfo Mandirola	3
(Switzerland) Max Christen	Maserati	Tipo 26	Maserati 2.0 L8 s	(Switzerland) Max Christen	3
(Hungary) István de Sztriha	Alfa Romeo	Monza	Alfa Romeo 2.6 L8 s	(Hungary) István de Sztriha	3
(Italy) Officine Alfieri Maserati	Maserati	8CTF	Maserati 3.0 L8 s	(Italy) Luigi Villoresi	4
(Italy) Officine Alfieri Maserati	Maserati	8CTF	Maserati 3.0 L8 s	(Italy) Carlo Felice Trossi	4
(Italy) Officine Alfieri Maserati	Maserati	8CTF	Maserati 3.0 L8 s	(Italy) Goffredo Zehender	4

=== Power for 1938 ===
Manufacturer	Model	Engine	Power Output	Max. Speed (km/h)	Dry Weight (kg)

== Season review ==
=== European Championship Grands Prix ===
Rd	Date	Name	Circuit	Winning drivers	Winning constructor	Report
1	3 July	(France) French Grand Prix	Reims-Gueux	(Germany) Manfred von Brauchitsch	Mercedes-Benz	Report
2	24 July	(Germany) German Grand Prix	Nürburgring	(United Kingdom) Richard Seaman	Mercedes-Benz	Report
3	21 August	(Switzerland) Swiss Grand Prix	Bremgarten	(Germany) Rudolf Caracciola	Mercedes-Benz	Report
4	11 September	(Italy) Italian Grand Prix	Monza	(Italy) Tazio Nuvolari	Auto Union	Report

=== Non-championship Grands Prix ===
Grandes Épreuves are denoted by a yellow background.

Date	Name	Circuit	Winning driver	Winning constructor	Report
10 April	(France) Pau Grand Prix	Pau	(France) René Dreyfus	Delahaye	Report
18 April	(United Kingdom) Campbell Trophy	Brooklands	(Thailand) Prince Bira	ERA	Report
23 April	(Republic of Ireland) Cork Grand Prix	Carrigrohane	(France) René Dreyfus	Delahaye	Report
15 May	(Libya) Tripoli Grand Prix	Mellaha	(Germany) Hermann Lang	Mercedes-Benz	Report
29 May	(Brazil) Gávea Nacional Circuit	Gávea	(Brazil) Arthur Nascimento Jr	Alfa Romeo	Report
5 June	(Belgium) Grand Prix des Frontières	Chimay	(France) Maurice Trintignant	Bugatti	Report
12 June	(Brazil) Rio de Janeiro Grand Prix	Gávea	(Italy) Carlo Maria Pintacuda	Alfa Romeo	Report
7 August	(Italy) Coppa Ciano	Montenero	(Germany) Hermann Lang	Mercedes-Benz	Report
14 August	(Italy) Coppa Acerbo	Pescara	(Germany) Rudolf Caracciola	Mercedes-Benz	Report
27 August	(United Kingdom) Junior Car Club 200 mile race	Brooklands	(United Kingdom) Johnny Wakefield	ERA	Report
15 October	(United Kingdom) Mountain Championship	Brooklands	(United Kingdom) Raymond Mays	ERA	Report
22 October	(United Kingdom) Donington Grand Prix	Donington Park	(Italy) Tazio Nuvolari	Auto Union	Report

== Championship final standings ==
Pos	Driver	FRA (France)	GER (Germany)	SUI (Switzerland)	ITA (Italy)	Pts
1	(Germany) Rudolf Caracciola	2	2	1	3	8
2	(Germany) Manfred von Brauchitsch	1	Ret	3	Ret	15
3	(Germany) Hermann Lang	3	Ret	10	Ret	17
4	(United Kingdom) Richard Seaman		1	2	Ret	18
5	(Italy) Tazio Nuvolari		Ret	9	1	20
=	(Germany) Hans Stuck		3	4	Ret	20
=	(Germany) Hermann Paul Müller		4	Ret	Ret	20
8	(Italy) Giuseppe Farina		Ret	5	2	21
9	(France) René Dreyfus		5	8		24
=	(Italy) Pietro Ghersi		8		5	24
11	(France) Jean-Pierre Wimille	Ret		7	Ret	25
12	(Italy) Piero Taruffi		Ret	6	Ret	26
13	(Italy) Clemente Biondetti		Ret		4	27
14	(France) René Carrière	4				28
=	(Switzerland) Christian Kautz	Ret		Ret	Ret	28
=	(Germany) Rudolf Hasse	Ret	Ret			28
=	(Germany) Paul Pietsch		6			28
=	(Italy) Renato Balestrero		7			28
=	(Italy) Franco Cortese		9			28
=	(France) "Raph"			11		28
=	(Italy) Emilio Romano			12		28
=	(Switzerland) Max Christen			13		28
=	(Italy) Edoardo Teagno			14		28
24	(France) Philippe Étancelin	Ret				29
=	(United Kingdom) A. B. Hyde		Ret			29
26	(Switzerland) Adolfo Mandirola			Ret		30
=	(Italy) Giovanni Minozzi			Ret		30
=	(Italy) Luigi Villoresi				Ret	30
=	(Italy) Goffredo Zehender				Ret	30
=	(Italy) Vittorio Belmondo				Ret	30
31	(France) Eugène Chaboud	Ret				31
=	(Switzerland) Toulo de Graffenried		Ret			31
=	(Italy) Franco Comotti		Ret			31
=	(Germany) Herbert Berg		Ret			31
=	(Hungary) István de Sztriha			Ret		31
36	(Italy) Carlo Felice Trossi				DSQ	32
Pos	Driver	FRA (France)	GER (Germany)	SUI (Switzerland)	ITA (Italy)	Pts

Colour	Result	Points
Gold	Winner	1
Silver	2nd place	2
Bronze	3rd place	3
Green	Completed more than 75%	4
Blue	Completed between 50% and 75%	5
Purple	Completed between 25% and 50%	6
Red	Completed less than 25%	7
Black	Disqualified	8
Blank	Did not participate	8
