= 1938 Donington Grand Prix =

Race details
- Date: 22 October 1938
- Official name: Fourth International Donington Grand Prix
- Location: Donington Park; Leicestershire, United Kingdom
- Course: Permanent racing facility
- Course length: 5.029 km (3.125 miles)
- Distance: 80 laps, 402.3 km (250.0 miles)
- Weather: Sunny, dry.
- Attendance: 61,000

Pole position
Driver	(Germany) Hermann Lang	Mercedes-Benz
- Time: 2:11.0

Fastest lap
Driver	(Italy) Tazio Nuvolari	Auto Union
- Time: 2:14.4

Podium
First	(Italy) Tazio Nuvolari	Auto Union
Second	(Germany) Hermann Lang	Mercedes-Benz
Third	(United Kingdom) Richard Seaman	Mercedes-Benz

The 1938 Donington Grand Prix was a Grand Prix motor race held on 22 October 1938 over 80 laps of the Donington Park circuit. The race was won by Tazio Nuvolari driving an Auto Union.

The race was organised by the Derby & District Motor Club and not by the Royal Automobile Club, and so is not generally accorded the title "British Grand Prix", notwithstanding that the race was run to the then-current international formula and attracted entries from the top teams, and that there were no other Grand Prix races organised that year in Great Britain.

== September 1938 events ==
The German-Czech Sudeten crisis was escalating in September 1938, with a deadline on 28 September 1938, and the Munich Agreement on 30 September 1938.

The Donington race was originally scheduled for the 1st of October. The 1938 Italian Grand Prix had taken place three weeks earlier, with Rudolf Caracciola winning the AIACR European Championship for a third time despite often being ill, and burning his feet in the car at Monza. For Donington, Walter Bäumer (1908–1941) took his Mercedes seat.

With the GP car racing season mostly over, the racing teams had opportunity to prepare in private, or at minor events. Some late hillclimbing events still remained, with Hans Stuck and Auto Union winning the Swiss Maloja Pass hillclimb on 25 September 1938, and in Romania on 2 October 1938 the Cluj-Feleacu hillclimb, plus on 16 October 1938 the Schulerau hillclimb to the Poiana Brașov ski resort.

The German Mercedes-Benz and Auto Union teams, which already had left a lasting impression at the 1937 Donington Grand Prix, had arrived early at Donington to prepare for the 1938 race. On 28 September they received order from the German embassy to leave England as fast as possible, and in worst case leave behind their material. The teams left Donington for Harwich and the Netherlands on two hours notice. The mechanics were prepared to put fire on the cars if stopped on the road. With the Germans gone and French entries unlikely, the decision was made to cancel the race. When the crisis was resolved by the Munich Agreement, the race was hastily rescheduled for the 22nd of October.

== Report ==
Nuvolari led off the start line, gradually building up a lead over the other German cars, with Müller, Brauchitsch, Seaman, Lang, Bäumer, Hasse and Kautz trailing Nuvolari for the first 3 laps or so. Then, on lap 4, Kautz crashed his Auto Union at Melbourne corner after his throttle jammed open, putting him out of the race. Villoresi, who was fastest of the non-German cars in practice, had made a poor start, but was now charging, reaching fifth place by lap 18, but would retire shortly after.

On lap 26, Nuvolari made a pitstop for new plugs, dropping him to fourth place, with Müller now leading Seaman and Lang. A few laps later, Robin Hanson's Alta had an engine failure, gushing oil all over the circuit near Hairpin Bend. Nuvolari nearly rolled his car, but recovered, while Brauchitsch spun twice, and Hasse suffered a race ending crash. Seaman also spun, losing a considerable amount of time being pushed away by marshals. The order then was Müller leading from Lang, Nuvolari, Brauchitsch and Bäumer.

With the race approaching half distance, the leaders started to make their fuel stops, first with Lang, and last to pit was Nuvolari, who also changed all four wheels. Just one lap after his pitstop, Bäumer's Mercedes approached Melbourne corner very slowly, and as he turned towards the pits, it became clear his engine was on fire, so he jumped clear as his car was engulfed. The pitstops and other incidents had left the top three as Lang leading from Müller and Nuvolari, who was charging. On lap 60 Nuvolari was past Müller and chasing down Lang. The gap dropped from 12 seconds on lap 63 to 10 seconds on lap 64, 6 seconds on lap 65, and 3 seconds on lap 66. Then finally Nuvolari was into first place on lap 67, passing Lang, likely affected by a shattered aero-screen, on the Starkey Straight. Nuvolari's lead continued to increase until the end of the race, and Seaman was able to overtake Müller for third place.

== Classification ==
=== Practice/Starting Grid ===
Pos	No	Driver	Car	Time	Gap
1	7	(Germany) Hermann Lang	Mercedes-Benz W154	2m11.0s	
2	4	(Italy) Tazio Nuvolari	Auto Union D	2m11.2s	+0.2s
3	6	(Germany) Manfred von Brauchitsch	Mercedes-Benz W154	2m11.4s	+0.4s
4	8	(United Kingdom) Richard Seaman	Mercedes-Benz W154	2m12.2s	+1.2s
5	1	(Germany) Hermann Müller	Auto Union D	2m12.6s	+1.6s
6	5	(Germany) Walter Bäumer	Mercedes-Benz W154	2m13.8s	+2.8s
7	14	(Germany) Rudolf Hasse	Auto Union D	2m15.4	+4.4s
8	3	(Switzerland) Christian Kautz	Auto Union D	2m18.6s	+7.6s
9	11	(Italy) Luigi Villoresi	Maserati 8CTF	2m21.0	+10.0s
10	19	(United Kingdom) Arthur Dobson	ERA B	2m24.6s	+13.6s
11	9	(France) René Dreyfus	Delahaye 155	2m25.4s	+14.4s
12	15	(United Kingdom) Ian Connell	ERA B	2m27.2s	+16.2s
13	18	(United Kingdom) W.E. Cotton	ERA B	2m28.6s	+17.6s
14	17	(United Kingdom) Angus Cuddon-Fletcher	MG K3 Magnette	2m29.8s	+18.6s
15	12	(United Kingdom) Percy Maclure	Riley 2000/6	2m30.4s	+19.4s
16	14	(United Kingdom) Robin Hanson	Alta	2m32.2s	+21.2s
17	10	(France) "Raph"	Delahaye 145	2m36.4s	+25.4s

=== Race ===
Pos	No	Driver	Car	Laps	Time/Retired	Grid
1	4	(Italy) Tazio Nuvolari	Auto Union D	80	3h06m22s	2
2	7	(Germany) Hermann Lang	Mercedes-Benz W154	80	+1m38s	1
3	8	(United Kingdom) Richard Seaman	Mercedes-Benz W154	79	+1 Lap	4
4	1	(Germany) Hermann Müller	Auto Union D	79	+1 Lap	5
5	6	(Germany) Manfred von Brauchitsch	Mercedes-Benz W154	79	+1 Lap	3
6	19	(United Kingdom) Arthur Dobson	ERA B	74	+6 Laps	10
7	18	(United Kingdom) W.E. Cotton (United Kingdom) W.E. Wilkinson	ERA B	74	+6 Laps	13
8	15	(United Kingdom) Ian Connell (United Kingdom) Peter Monkhouse	ERA B	74	+6 Laps	12
DNF	5	(Germany) Walter Bäumer	Mercedes-Benz W154	43	Engine Fire	6
DNF	14	(Germany) Rudolf Hasse	Auto Union D	29	Accident	7
DNF	14	(United Kingdom) Robin Hanson	Alta	25	Engine	16
DNF	9	(France) René Dreyfus	Delahaye 155	23	Oil Pressure	11
DNF	11	(Italy) Luigi Villoresi	Maserati 8CTF	18	Engine	9
DNF	17	(United Kingdom) Angus Cuddon-Fletcher	MG K3 Magnette	17	Brakes	14
DNF	12	(United Kingdom) Percy Maclure	Riley 2000/6	12	Drive shaft	15
DNF	10	(France) "Raph"	Delahaye 145	10	Oil pressure	17
DNF	3	(Switzerland) Christian Kautz	Auto Union D	2	Accident	8

Grand Prix Race
1938 Grand Prix season
Previous race: 1937 Donington Grand Prix	Donington Grand Prix	Next race: none
