= 1938 German Grand Prix =

Motor race held at the Nürburgring

- Race 2 of 4 in the 1938 European Championship

Race details
- Date: 24 July 1938
- Official name: XI Großer Preis von Deutschland
- Location: Nürburgring; Nürburg, Germany
- Course: Permanent racing facility
- Course length: 22.810 km (14.173 miles)
- Distance: 22 laps, 501.82 km (311.82 miles)
- Attendance: 350,000

Pole position
| Driver | (Germany) Manfred von Brauchitsch | Mercedes-Benz |
- Time: 9:48.4

Fastest lap
| Driver | (United Kingdom) Richard Seaman | Mercedes-Benz |
- Time: 10:09.1

Podium
| First | (United Kingdom) Richard Seaman | Mercedes-Benz |
| Second | (Germany) Rudolf Caracciola; (Germany) Hermann Lang | Mercedes-Benz |
| Third | (Germany) Hans Stuck | Auto Union |

The 1938 German Grand Prix was a championship Grand Prix held on 24 July 1938 at the Nürburgring in Nazi Germany. It was the 2nd race in the 1938 European Championship. The race which was 22 laps, was won by Richard Seaman driving a Mercedes-Benz W154 after starting from 3rd place.

== Entries ==
| No. | Driver | Entrant | Car |
|---|---|---|---|
| 2 | (Italy) Tazio Nuvolari | Auto Union AG | Auto Union D |
| 4 | (Germany) Hans Stuck | Auto Union AG | Auto Union D |
| 6 | (Germany) Rudolf Hasse | Auto Union AG | Auto Union C/D |
| 8 | (Germany) Hermann Müller | Auto Union AG | Auto Union C/D |
| 10 | (Germany) Rudolf Caracciola | Daimler-Benz AG | Mercedes-Benz W154 |
| 12 | (Germany) Manfred von Brauchitsch | Daimler-Benz AG | Mercedes-Benz W154 |
| 14 | (Germany) Hermann Lang | Daimler-Benz AG | Mercedes-Benz W154 |
| 16 | (United Kingdom) Richard Seaman | Daimler-Benz AG | Mercedes-Benz W154 |
| 18 | (Germany) Walter Bäumer | Daimler-Benz AG | Mercedes-Benz W154 |
| 20 | (France) René Dreyfus | Ecurie Bleue | Delahaye 145 |
| 22 | (Italy) Franco Comotti | Ecurie Bleue | Delahaye 145 |
| 24 | (Italy) Giuseppe Farina | Alfa Corse | Alfa Romeo Tipo 312 |
| 26 | (Italy) Clemente Biondetti | Alfa Corse | Alfa Romeo Tipo 312 |
| 28 | (Italy) Piero Taruffi | Scuderia Torino | Alfa Romeo Tipo 308 |
| 30 | (Italy) Pietro Ghersi | Scuderia Torino | Alfa Romeo 8C 2900A |
| 32 | (Switzerland) Toulo de Graffenried | Baron de Graffenried | Maserati 6C-34 |
| 34 | (Hungary) Ernõ Festetics | Graf Festetics | Alfa Romeo Tipo B/P3 |
| 36 | (United Kingdom) A. B. Hyde | A. Hyde | Maserati 8CM |
| 38 | (Germany) Herbert Berg | Ecurie Helvetia | Maserati 6CM |
| 40 | (Germany) Paul Pietsch | Ecurie Helvetia | Maserati 6CM |
| 42 | (Italy) Renato Balestrero | R. Balestrero | Alfa Romeo Tipo 308 |
| 44 | (Italy) Franco Cortese | Scuderia Ambrosiana | Maserati 6CM |

== Race ==
| Pos. | Driver | Entrant | Car | Laps | Time/Retired |
|---|---|---|---|---|---|
| 1 | (United Kingdom) Richard Seaman | Daimler-Benz AG | Mercedes-Benz W154 | 22 | 3:51:46.1 |
| 2 | (Germany) Rudolf Caracciola (Germany) Hermann Lang^{2} | Daimler-Benz AG | Mercedes-Benz W154 | 22 | 3:55:06.1 |
| 3 | (Germany) Hans Stuck | Auto Union AG | Auto Union D | 22 | 4:00:42.3 |
| 4 | (Germany) Hermann Müller (Italy) Tazio Nuvolari^{3} | Auto Union AG | Auto Union C/D | 22 | 4:01:19.1 |
| 5 | (France) René Dreyfus | Ecurie Bleue | Delahaye 145 | 21 | |
| 6 | (Germany) Paul Pietsch | Ecurie Helvetia | Maserati 6CM | 20 | |
| 7 | (Italy) Renato Balestrero | R. Balestrero | Alfa Romeo Tipo 308 | | |
| 8 | (Italy) Pietro Ghersi | Scuderia Torino | Alfa Romeo 8C 2900A | | |
| 9 | (Italy) Franco Cortese | Scuderia Ambrosiana | Maserati 6CM | | |
| Ret | (Germany) Rudolf Hasse | Auto Union AG | Auto Union C/D | 15 | Engine |
| Ret | (Germany) Hermann Lang^{2} (Germany) Walter Bäumer^{1} | Daimler-Benz AG | Mercedes-Benz W154 | 15 | Engine |
| Ret | (Germany) Manfred von Brauchitsch | Daimler-Benz AG | Mercedes-Benz W154 | 15 | Crash |
| Ret | (United Kingdom) A. B. Hyde | A. Hyde | Maserati 8CM | 14 | Crashed into ditch |
| Ret | (Switzerland) Toulo de Graffenried | Baron de Graffenried | Maserati 6C-34 | 3 | Transmission |
| Ret | (Italy) Giuseppe Farina | Alfa Corse | Alfa Romeo Tipo 312 | 2 | Mechanical |
| Ret | (Italy) Piero Taruffi | Scuderia Torino | Alfa Romeo Tipo 308 | 2 | Skidded off track |
| Ret | (Italy) Tazio Nuvolari | Auto Union AG | Auto Union D | 2 | Crash |
| Ret | (Italy) Clemente Biondetti | Alfa Corse | Alfa Romeo Tipo 312 | 1 | Crash |
| Ret | (Italy) Franco Comotti | Ecurie Bleue | Delahaye 145 | 1 | Gearbox |
| Ret | (Germany) Herbert Berg | Ecurie Helvetia | Maserati 6CM | 1 | Fuel Pump |
| DNS | (Germany) Walter Bäumer^{1} | Daimler-Benz AG | Mercedes-Benz W154 | | |
| DNA | (Hungary) Ernõ Festetics | Graf Festetics | Alfa Romeo Tipo B/P3 | | |

Notes

- ^1 - After Walter Bäumer's car failed to start, he joined Hermann Lang in the #14 car.
- ^2 - Subsequently, after the #14 car suffered an engine failure, Hermann Lang took over Rudolf Caracciola's #10 car, the latter whom was suffering from an illness.
- ^3 - After Tazio Nuvolari's lap 2 crash, Hermann Müller handed his #2 car over to Nuvolari without being ordered to.

Grand Prix Race
| Previous race: 1938 French Grand Prix | 1938 Grand Prix season Grandes Épreuves | Next race: 1938 Swiss Grand Prix |
| Previous race: 1937 German Grand Prix | German Grand Prix | Next race: 1939 German Grand Prix |
