= Campbell Trophy (Grand Prix) =

The Campbell Trophy was a non-championship Grand Prix held at Brooklands, Great Britain, in 1937, 1938 and 1939. The most successful driver was Prince Bira. He won the first two races and came second in the third race.

== Results ==
Year	Date	Class	Winner			Second place			Third place			Report
Year	Date	Class	No.	Driver	Car	No.	Driver	Car	No.	Driver	Car	Report
1937	May 1	Over 1500cc	2	(Thailand) Prince Bira	Maserati 8CM	15	(United Kingdom) Teddy Rayson	Maserati 4C	21	(United Kingdom) Anthony Powys-Lybbe	Alfa Romeo Monza	Report
1937	May 1	1500cc	15	(United Kingdom) Teddy Rayson	Maserati 4C	6	(United Kingdom) Denis Scribbans	ERA B-Type	5	(United Kingdom) Reggie Tongue	ERA B-Type	Report
1938	April 18	N/A		(Thailand) Prince Bira	ERA	5	(United Kingdom) Arthur Dobson	ERA		(United Kingdom) Arthur Hyde	Maserati 8CM	Report
1939	August 7	N/A		(United Kingdom) Raymond Mays	ERA D-Type		(Thailand) Prince Bira	Maserati 8CM		(United Kingdom) Peter Aitken	ERA B-Type	Report

== Sources ==
- www.kolumbus.fi, 1937 Campbell Trophy. Also 1938 and 1939 were used.
- YouTube, 1937 Campbell Trophy
- sl.wikipedia.org, 1937 Campbell Trophy. Also 1938 and 1939 were used.
- www.kolumbus.fi, Teddy Rayson
- Racing Sports Cars, Anthony Powys-Lybbe
- www.kolumbus.fi, Dennis Scribbans
- Racing Sports Cars, Arthur Dobson
- www.kolumbus.fi, Arthur Hyde
- Racing Sports Cars, Peter Aitken
- Racing Sports Cars, Reggie Tongue
