= Billy Cotton =

English bandleader (1899–1969)

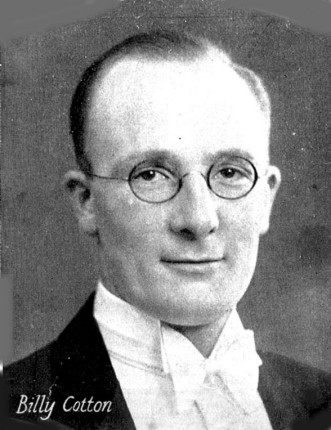
- Cotton in 1928

Background information
- Born: William Edward Cotton; 6 May 1899; Smith Square, London, England
- Died: 25 March 1969 (aged 69) Wembley, London, England
- Genres: Big band
- Occupations: Musician, radio personality, singer
- Years active: Early 1920s–1969

William Edward Cotton (6 May 1899 – 25 March 1969) was an English band leader and entertainer, one of the few whose orchestras survived the British dance band era. Cotton is now mainly remembered as a 1950s and 1960s radio and television personality, but his musical career had begun in the 1920s. In his younger years, Billy Cotton was also an amateur footballer for Brentford (and later, for the then Athenian league club Wimbledon), an accomplished racing driver and the owner of a Gipsy Moth, which he piloted himself. His autobiography, I Did It My Way, was published in 1970, a year after his death.

== Life and career ==
Born in Smith Square, Westminster, London, to Joseph and Susan Cotton, Cotton was a choirboy and started his musical career as a drummer. He enlisted in the Royal Fusiliers by falsifying his age and saw service in the First World War in Malta and Egypt before landing at Gallipoli in the middle of an artillery barrage. He was recommended for a commission and learned to fly Bristol Fighter aircraft. Not yet 19 years old, he flew solo for the first time in 1918, on the day the Royal Flying Corps became the Royal Air Force. After the end of the war, in the early 1920s, he worked at several jobs, including as a bus driver, before setting up his own orchestra, the London Savannah Band, in 1924.

At first a conventional dance band, the London Savannah Band gradually tended towards music hall/vaudeville entertainment, introducing visual and verbal humour in between songs. Famous musicians who played in Billy Cotton's band during the 1920s and 1930s included Arthur Rosebery, Syd Lipton and Nat Gonella. The band was also noted for their African American trombonist and tap dancer, Ellis Jackson. Their signature tune was "Somebody Stole My Gal", and they made numerous commercial recordings for Decca.

During the Second World War Cotton and his band toured France with the Entertainments National Service Association (ENSA). After the war, he started his successful Sunday lunchtime radio show on BBC, the Billy Cotton Band Show, which ran from 1949 to 1968. In the 1950s, composer Lionel Bart contributed comedy songs to the show. It regularly opened with the band's signature tune and Cotton's call of "Wakey Wakey". From 1956, it was also broadcast on BBC television. Cotton often also provided vocals on many of his band's recordings, in addition to work as a vocalist on recordings that did not feature his band.

== Motor racing career ==
As a racing driver, he raced at Brooklands between the wars, and sometimes arranged concerts near racing venues; he won the last-ever race on the Brooklands Mountain circuit, in August 1939, in his English Racing Automobiles B-type, beating Percy Maclure to the line by 0.2 seconds. Cotton took part in two Grands Prix, the first a 7th place finish at the 1938 Donington Grand Prix and second of the non-German cars, sharing the B-type with Wilkie Wilkinson; the E.R.A. team secured the team prize as a result. He also finished fourth in the 1949 British Grand Prix, sharing an E.R.A. with David Hampshire.

== Personal life ==
Cotton married Mabel E. Gregory in 1921. They had two sons, Ted and Bill Cotton, who later became the BBC's managing director of television; despite this, he had an affair with one of his band's singers (Doreen Stephans) and moved into a flat with her in the early 1950s. In 1962, Billy Cotton suffered a stroke. He died in 1969 while watching a boxing match at Wembley Arena.

Billy Cotton was the great-great-uncle of TV and radio presenter Fearne Cotton.

== Selected filmography ==
- The First Mrs. Fraser (1932)
- Variety (1935)
- Music Hall Parade (1939)

== Bibliography ==
- I Did It My Way, Autobiography, 1970, Publisher: George G. Harrap & Co. Ltd. SBN 245 59941 x.
- The Greatest Billy Cotton Band Show, John Maxwell, 1976, Publisher: Jupiter Books (London) Ltd. SBN 904041 31x.
- Ades, David; Bickerdyke, Percy; Holmes, Eric (1999). This England's Book of British Dance Bands. Cheltenham: This England Books. ISBN 0-906324-25-4.
