= Robin Hanson (racing driver) =

British racing driver and RAF pilot (1908–1991)

- Born: Robert Lewis Hanson; 9 March 1908 Greenwich, London
- Died: 27 September 1991 (aged 83) Montreal, Canada

Robert Lewis "Robin" Hanson DFC (9 March 1908 – 27 September 1991) was a British Grand Prix racing driver and Royal Air Force pilot during the Second World War, who was awarded the Distinguished Flying Cross in 1942.

== Early life ==
Hanson emigrated to Canada in 1927, where he married for the first time, and became a stage actor of some note. His marriage ended in divorce and in 1934 he returned to England.

== Motor racing career ==
Hanson in the 6CM at the 1937 Donington Grand Prix

In 1934 he went up to read jurisprudence at Exeter College, Oxford. In 1935 he took part in the 1935 Inter-Varsity Trial in a 2-litre Bugatti.

In 1936, he took on racing at Brooklands, in an MG Q-type, funded by Mrs M. E. Hall-Smith (née Wrigley), who was the daughter of a paper manufacturer from Bury, Lancashire; she later bought him a Maserati 6CM which he used in voiturette racing in 1937 and 1938. He habitually wore red overalls and crash helmet.

He took part in two Grandes Epreuves, the 1937 and 1938 Donington Grands Prix. In the former race, in the Maserati, he was flagged off before completing the full distance, having twice spun off at Melbourne Corner; in the latter, driving an Alta for the first time, he went out early with engine problems, but not before dumping a significant amount of oil on the track, and inadvertently eliminating Rudolf Hasse, who spun on the oil, from the race.

In 1939, Mrs Hall-Smith bought an E.R.A. B-type (chassis R6B) from Ian Connell, which she had repainted red, and with which Hanson took part - without success - in a handful of voiturette races.

== RAF career ==
Hanson married a second time in July 1939 and joined the Royal Air Force, becoming a flight-lieutenant. In 1942, while based in County Londonderry, Northern Ireland, he was awarded the Distinguished Flying Cross, for attacking five U-boats seen attacking a British convoy; when he had run out of bombs, he forced them to re-submerge by attacking with machine guns. He ultimately ended up as wing-commander.

== Later life ==
Despite expressing an interest in buying a new E-type E.R.A. after the war, Hanson never returned to the sport. After marrying a Canadian woman in 1959, Hanson emigrated to Montreal, where he died in 1991; he was known as "the Major" and was notable in the contract bridge community.

== Results ==
- Golden Era of Grand Prix Racing
