= 1935 Donington Grand Prix =

1935 motor race

- 1935 Grand Prix season
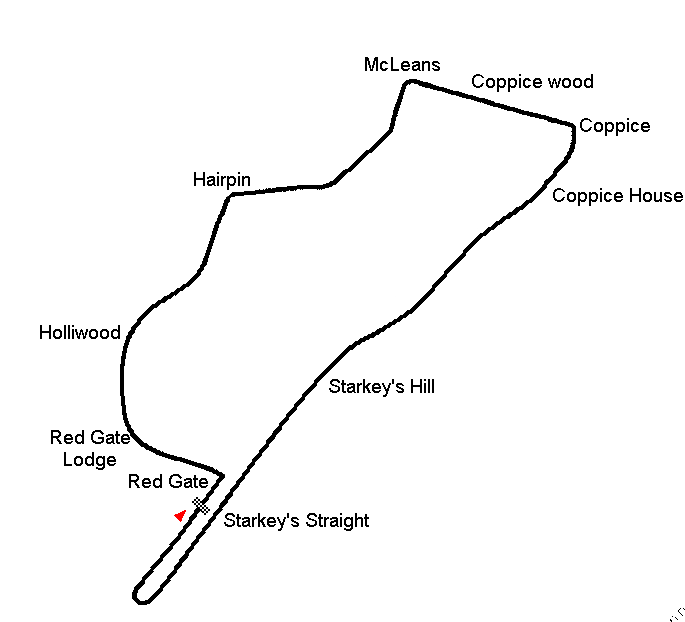

Race details
- Date: 5 October 1935
- Official name: I Donington Grand Prix
- Location: North West Leicestershire, England
- Course: Road course
- Course length: 4.107 km (2.552 miles)
- Distance: 120 laps, 492.8 km (306.2 miles)
- Weather: Heavy rain

Pole position
Driver	(France) Raymond Sommer	Raymond Sommer
- Time: 2:04.0

Fastest lap
Driver	(Italy) Giuseppe Farina	Scuderia Subalpina
- Time: 2:08.4

Podium
First	(United Kingdom) Richard Shuttleworth	Richard Shuttleworth
Second	(United Kingdom) Earl Howe	Earl Howe
Third	(United Kingdom) Charlie Martin	Charles Martin

The 1935 Donington Grand Prix was a non-championship Grand Prix that was held on 5 October 1935 at Donington Park in North West Leicestershire, England. It was the 39th race of the 1935 Grand Prix season. The race, which was 120 laps, was won by Richard Shuttleworth driving an Alfa Romeo Tipo-B "P3" after starting from 7th place.

It was the first major international Grand Prix to take place on a road course in Great Britain.

== Entries ==
No.	Driver	Entrant	Car	Notes
1	(United Kingdom) Earl Howe	Earl Howe	Bugatti T59	
2	(United Kingdom) Charlie Martin	Charles Martin	Bugatti T59	
3	(United Kingdom) Lindsay Eccles	AHL Eccles	Bugatti T59	
4	(United Kingdom) Brian Lewis	Freddie Dixon	Riley 2000/6	
5	(United Kingdom) Wal Handley	Freddie Dixon	Riley 2000/6	
6	(United Kingdom) Percy Maclure	Percy Maclure	Riley 2000/6	
7	(United Kingdom) Hector Dobbs	Hector Dobbs	Riley 2000/6	
8	(France) Raymond Sommer	Raymond Sommer	Alfa Romeo Tipo-B "P3"	
9	(United Kingdom) Richard Shuttleworth	Richard Shuttleworth	Alfa Romeo Tipo-B "P3"	
10	(United Kingdom) Harry Rose	Harry Rose	Alfa Romeo 8C "Monza"	
11	(United Kingdom) Bill Everitt	Scuderia Subalpina	Maserati 6C-34	
12	(United Kingdom) Buddy Featherstonhaugh	Harry Rose	Maserati 8CM	
14	(Thailand) "B. Bira"	Prince Chula	ERA B-Type	
15	(Greece) Nicholas Embiricos	Nicholas Embiricos	ERA B-Type	did not arrive
16	(Italy) Giuseppe Farina	Scuderia Subalpina	Maserati V8RI	
17	(United Kingdom) Luis Fontes	Luis Fontes	Alfa Romeo Monza	reserve entry, did not start
18	(United Kingdom) Austin Dobson	Austin Dobson	Maserati 8C-3000	

== Qualifying ==
Pos.	No.	Driver	Car	Time
1	16	(Italy) Giuseppe Farina	Maserati V8RI	2:08.4
2	6	(United Kingdom) Percy Maclure	Riley 2000/6	2:14.0
3	8	(France) Raymond Sommer	Alfa Romeo Tipo-B "P3"	2:14.0
4	1	(United Kingdom) Earl Howe	Bugatti T59	2:16.0
5	12	(United Kingdom) Buddy Featherstonhaugh	Maserati 8CM	2:17.0
6	5	(United Kingdom) Wal Handley	Riley 2000/6	2:17.0
7	9	(United Kingdom) Richard Shuttleworth	Alfa Romeo Tipo-B "P3"	2:19.0
8	2	(United Kingdom) Charlie Martin	Bugatti T59	2:21.8
9	10	(United Kingdom) Harry Rose	Alfa Romeo 8C "Monza"	2:23.0
10	14	(Thailand) "B. Bira"	ERA B-Type	2:23.0
11	7	(United Kingdom) Hector Dobbs	Riley 2000/6	2:23.0
12	11	(United Kingdom) Bill Everitt	Maserati 6C-34	2:23.0
13	4	(United Kingdom) Brian Lewis	Riley 2000/6	2:24.0
14	18	(United Kingdom) Austin Dobson	Maserati 8C-3000	2:27.0
15	3	(United Kingdom) Lindsay Eccles	Bugatti T59	Unknown

The grid consisted of five rows of three, with cars supposed to be lined up with fastest in the middle, second fastest on left and third fastest on the right. It is unclear why Handley started from row 4, why Martin and Rose had swapped positions, or why Dobbs and Everitt started from the back row.

Luis Fontes, as the reserve entry, was allowed to practise, setting a best time of 2 minutes 28 seconds dead, but, as nobody had dropped out before the race, Fontes was not allowed to start.

== Race ==
Pos.	No.	Driver(s)	Car	Laps	Time/Retired
1	9	(United Kingdom) Richard Shuttleworth	Alfa Romeo Tipo-B "P3"	120	4:47:12.0
2	1	(United Kingdom) Earl Howe	Bugatti T59	120	4:47:57.8
3	2	(United Kingdom) Charlie Martin	Bugatti T59	120	4:49:47.4
4	11	(United Kingdom) Bill Everitt (Italy) Gino Rovere	Maserati 6C-34	120	4:53:59.0
5	14	(Thailand) "B. Bira"	ERA B-Type	120	4:58:16.0
6	3	(United Kingdom) Lindsay Eccles (United Kingdom) Pat Fairfield	Bugatti T59	120	4:59:53.0
NC	7	(United Kingdom) Hector Dobbs (United Kingdom) Bill von der Becke	Riley 2000/6	119	Flagged off
NC	4	(United Kingdom) Brian Lewis (United Kingdom) Cyril Paul	Riley 2000/6	117	Flagged off
NC	5	(United Kingdom) Wal Handley (United Kingdom) Pat Driscoll	Riley 2000/6	115	Flagged off
Ret	6	(United Kingdom) Percy Maclure (United Kingdom) Edgar Maclure	Riley 2000/6	95	Mechanical
Ret	12	(United Kingdom) Buddy Featherstonhaugh	Maserati 8CM	82	Transmission
Ret	8	(France) Raymond Sommer	Alfa Romeo Tipo-B "P3"	70	Half-shaft
Ret	18	(United Kingdom) Austin Dobson	Maserati 8C-3000	67	Crash
Ret	16	(Italy) Giuseppe Farina	Maserati V8RI	41	Half-shaft
Ret	10	(United Kingdom) Harry Rose	Alfa Romeo 8C "Monza"	38	Engine

Grand Prix Race
1935 Grand Prix season
Previous race: None	Donington Grand Prix	Next race: 1936 Donington Grand Prix
