= Angus Cuddon-Fletcher =

British engineer and racing driver (1909–1974)

Humphrey Cuddon-Fletcher
- Born: Angus Humphrey Cuddon-Fletcher; 3 July 1909 Dunans, Argyllshire
- Died: 13 June 1974 (aged 64) Oshkosh, Wisconsin

Angus Humphrey Cuddon-Fletcher (3 July 1909 – 13 June 1974) was a British engineer and racing driver, who took part in one Grand Prix.

== Career ==
The Parnell-MG Magnette as raced by Cuddon-Fletcher at the 1938 Donington Grand Prix, bearing the number 17 as used in the race, Goodwood Festival of Speed 2012

Cuddon-Fletcher's first appearance of note was being entered by the temporarily-banned Reg Parnell in a 1,087cc MG K3 Special, chassis number K3009, in 1938; Cuddon-Fletcher was described as an "inventor".

Cuddon-Fletcher enjoyed a run of success in the blue MG, winning only his second race with the car, and he duly bought it from Parnell. Cuddon-Fletcher's most notable triumph was in winning the 1.1 litre class at the J.C.C. 200 miles race at Brooklands (and finishing 5th overall), which meant that, as the season came to a climax, he was running second in the British Motor Racing Organisers' Association championship, which paid out a prize of £250. The final event was the 1938 Donington Grand Prix, which awarded three points for starting and 12 for finishing, and Cuddon-Fletcher was two points behind points leader Percy Maclure. Both duly entered the race, but both retired, Cuddon-Fletcher after hitting the bank at the Melbourne Hairpin, leaving Maclure as the champion.

It was however Cuddon-Fletcher's last hurrah as he decided to stop racing at the end of the year. Cuddon-Fletcher emigrated to the United States after the Second World War, and died in Oshkosh in June 1974.

== Name ==
Although later works sometimes refer to him as Humphrey Cuddon-Fletcher, contemporary reports refer to him as Angus, A., or A. H. Cuddon-Fletcher.
