= Arthur Hyde =

Arthur Hyde may refer to:

- Arthur M. Hyde (1877–1947), American politician
- Arthur B. Hyde (1915–2005), British racing driver
