= 1937 Donington Grand Prix =

Race details
- Date: 2 October 1937
- Official name: III Donington Grand Prix
- Location: Donington Park; Leicestershire, United Kingdom
- Course: Permanent racing facility
- Course length: 5.029 km (3.125 miles)
- Distance: 80 laps, 402.3 km (250.0 miles)
- Weather: Sunny, slightly misty, dry.
- Attendance: 50,000

Pole position
Driver	(Germany) Manfred von Brauchitsch	Mercedes-Benz
- Time: 2:10.4

Fastest lap
Drivers	(Germany) Bernd Rosemeyer	Auto Union
	(Germany) Manfred von Brauchitsch	Mercedes-Benz
- Time: 2:11.4

Podium
First	(Germany) Bernd Rosemeyer	Auto Union
Second	(Germany) Manfred von Brauchitsch	Mercedes-Benz
Third	(Germany) Rudolf Caracciola	Mercedes-Benz

The 1937 Donington Grand Prix was a Grand Prix motor race held on 2 October 1937 at the Donington Park circuit.

== Race report ==
In a last hurrah of the unlimited 750kg GP formula which expired after the 1937 Grand Prix season, the Germans brought no less than eight cars to Donington, five Mercedes-Benz W125 and three Auto Union C, each over 500 hp.

At first the Germans used Nürburgring axle ratios, which were too low, and after a change, the speed down Starkey's Straight went from 155 to 170 m.p.h., "a speed never before seen in Britain". Manfred von Brauchitsch and Bernd Rosemeyer were the fastest in practise, while Hasse was the slowest of the seven Germans that started. Kautz as the Mercedes reserve driver did only practise laps.

In the race, Hermann Lang led the first few laps but retired with a broken damper. On the third lap British driver Richard Seaman was shunted by Müller up the escape road from where he restarted with crippled rear suspension and a broken shock absorber. He kept grimly on and retired only after Lang.

With Lang out, the lead changed hands several times between von Brauchitsch, Rosemeyer and Rudolf Caracciola. Whilst in the lead for a second time, v. Brauchitsch suffered a puncture, allowing Rosemeyer to pass him and lead the race while his Auto Union teammates Müller and Hasse could not keep up in the tricky mid-engined car, getting lapped. Rosemeyer stayed in the lead until the end and took his final win after 80 laps, with four other German cars completing the full distance within the next 8 minutes before the race was flagged off for good for the remaining cars.

== "When the Germans came to Donington" ==
In "When the Germans came to Donington", Rodney Walkerley describes the impression the German cars made in 1937 on local British journalists who had not yet witnessed them abroad, being confident in the skills and machinery of British racers.

Away beyond the woods we heard the approaching scream of a well-tuned E.R.A. and down the winding slope towards us came Raymond Mays. He changed down, braked, skirted round the Hairpin and was gone.

"There's the winner," remarked one of my friends. "Knows this course backwards."

Half a minute later came the deeper note of a 2.9-litre Maserati, and "B. Bira" (Prince Birabongse of Siam, Mays’ nearest rival and a new star in the racing firmament) shot past us, cornering with that precision which marked him as the master he was.

"Or him," said another.

We waited again. Then they came.

Far away in the distance we heard an angry, deep-throated roaring – as someone once remarked, like hungry lions impatient for the arena. A few moments later, Manfred von Brauchitsch, red helmeted, brought a great, silver projectile snaking down the hill, and close behind, his teammate Rudolf Caracciola, then at the height of his great career. The two cars took the hairpin, von Brauchitsch almost sideways, and rocketed away out of sight with long plumes of rubber smoke trailing from their huge rear tyres, in a deafening crash of sound.

The startled Pressmen gazed at each other, awe-struck.

"Strewth," gasped one of them, "so that's what they're like!"

That was what they were like.

These were the fabulous machines which could top 190 m.p.h. on the long straights at Rheims and Spa and Pescara and which, on the twists and turns of the mountainous Nurburgring, scrubbed the tread from the tyres in 80 miles. On the starting line they weighed just over a ton, 75-gallon tanks filled to the brim to be emptied at the rate o 3 to 4 miles per gallon.

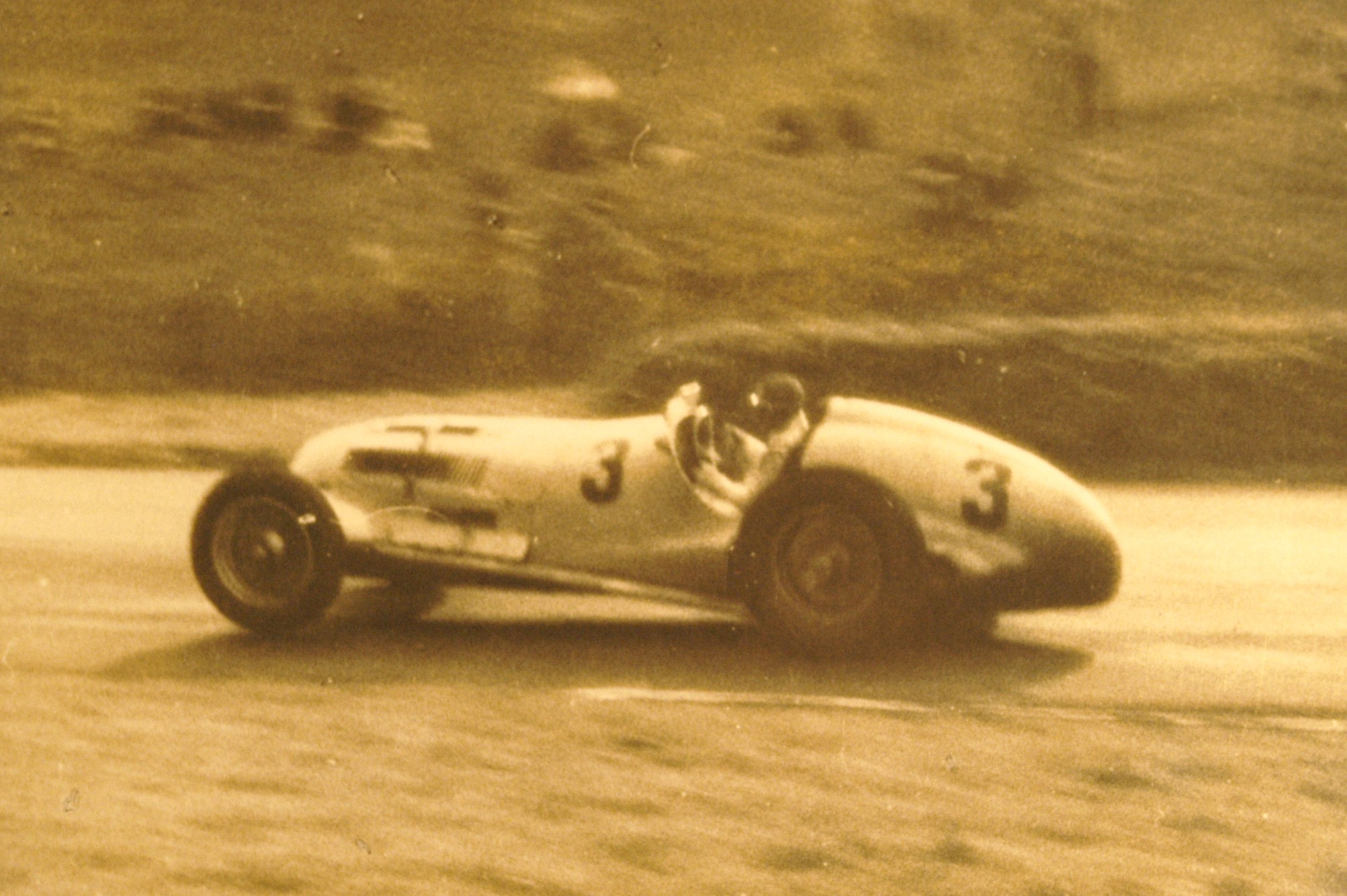
Manfred Von Brauchitsch, Mercedes-Benz

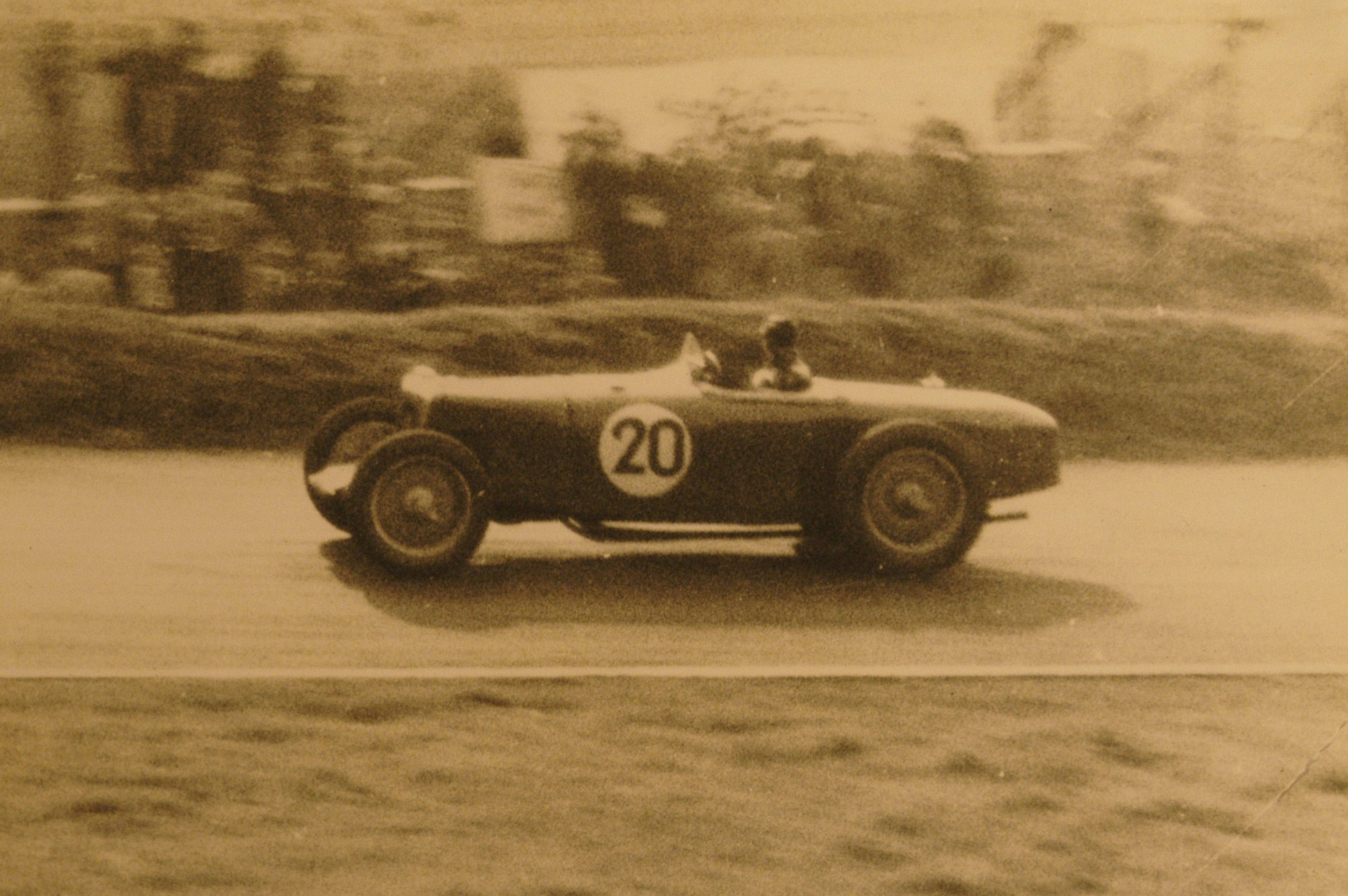
Percy Maclure, Riley

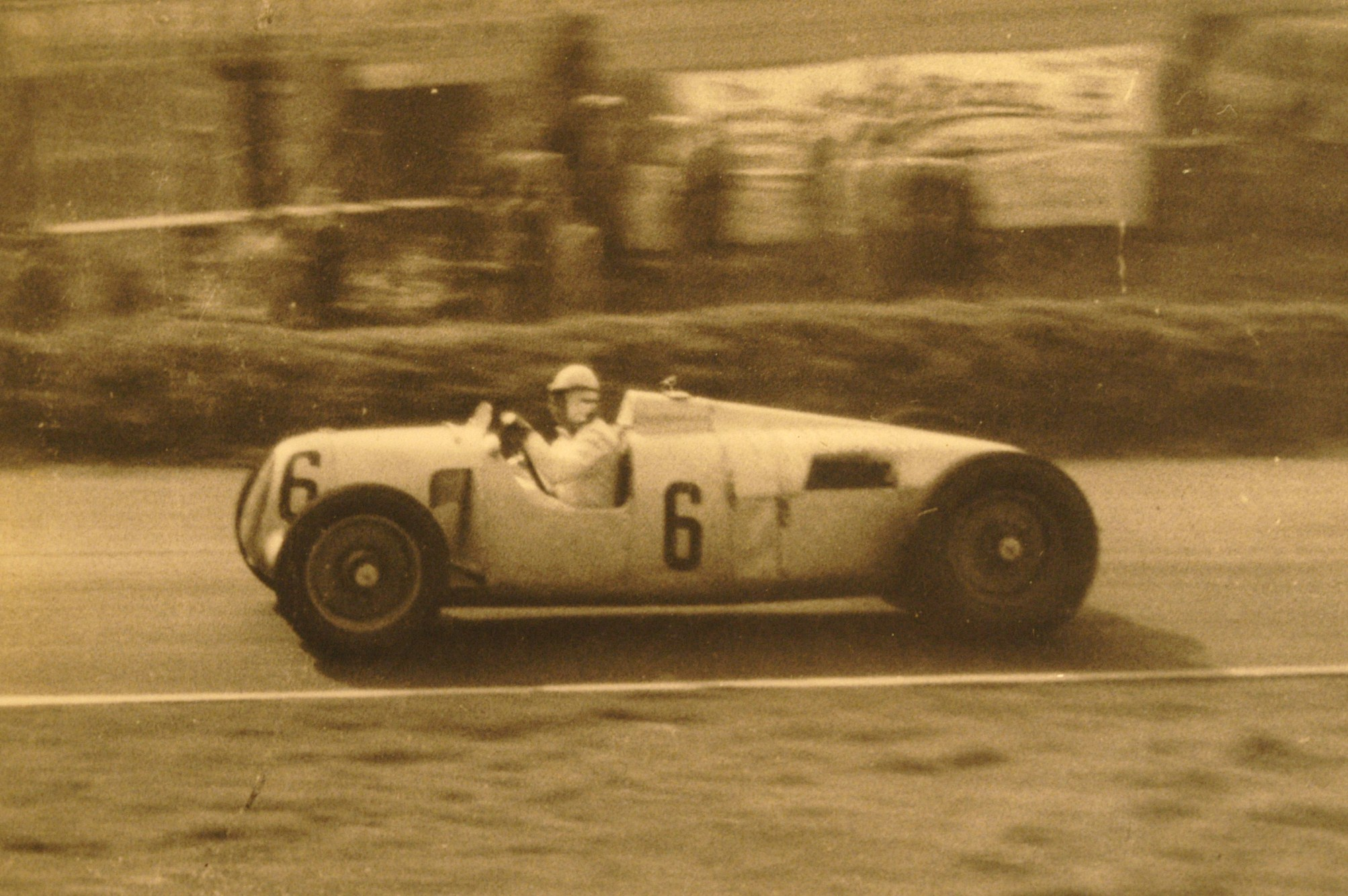
Rudolf Hasse, Auto Union

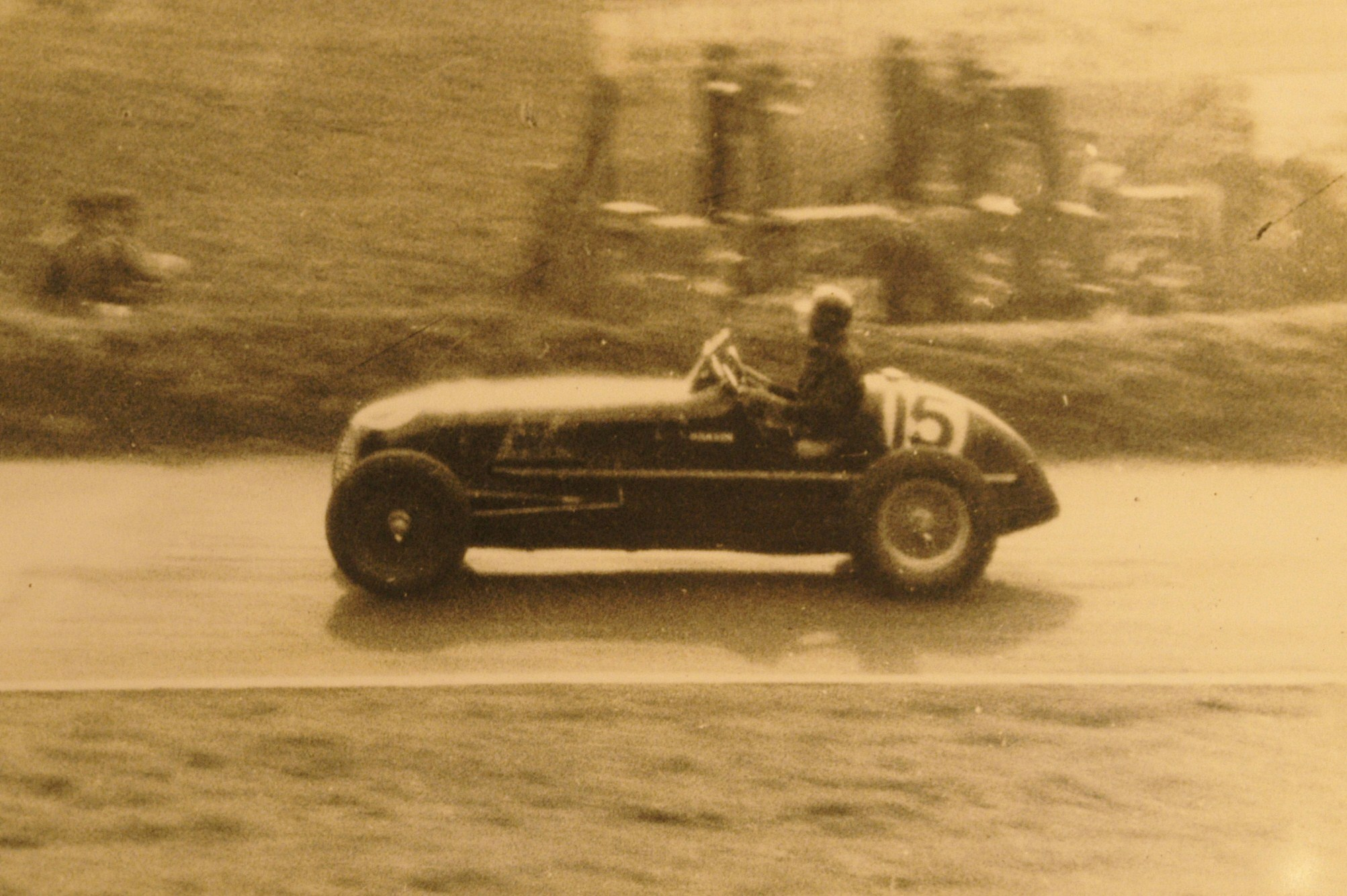
Robin Hanson, Maserati

== Entries ==
No	Driver	Entrant	Constructor	Car
1	(Germany) Rudolf Caracciola	Daimler-Benz AG	Mercedes-Benz	W125
2	(Germany) Hermann Lang	Daimler-Benz AG	Mercedes-Benz	W125
2	(Switzerland) Christian Kautz	Daimler-Benz AG	Mercedes-Benz	W125
3	(Germany) Manfred von Brauchitsch	Daimler-Benz AG	Mercedes-Benz	W125
4	(United Kingdom) Richard Seaman	Daimler-Benz AG	Mercedes-Benz	W125
5	(Germany) Bernd Rosemeyer	Auto Union	Auto Union	Type C
6	(Germany) Rudolf Hasse	Auto Union	Auto Union	Type C
7	(Germany) Hermann Paul Müller	Auto Union	Auto Union	Type C
8	(United Kingdom) Raymond Mays	H. W. Cook	ERA	
9	(United Kingdom) Earl Howe	H. W. Cook	ERA	
10	(United Kingdom) Arthur Dobson	H. W. Cook	ERA	B
19	(United Kingdom) Arthur Dobson	H. W. Cook	ERA	B
11	(Thailand) Prince Bira	Private	Maserati	8CM
12	(United Kingdom) A. B. Hyde	Private	Maserati	8CM
14	(United Kingdom) Antony Powys-Lybbe	Private	Alfa Romeo	Monza
15	(United Kingdom) Robin Hanson	Mrs M. E. Hall-Smith	Maserati	
16	(United Kingdom) Peter Whitehead	Private	ERA	
16	(United Kingdom) Peter Walker	Private	ERA	
17	(United Kingdom) Reginald Tongue	Private	ERA	
18	(United Kingdom) Charles Martin	Private	ERA	
18	(United Kingdom) Charles Martin	Private	Maserati	6CM
20	(United Kingdom) Percy Maclure	Private	Riley	2000/6

Notes:

- Arthur Dobson was entered with both number 10 and 19.
- Christian Kautz was a reserve driver but took part in practice sessions.
- Charles Martin used both an ERA and a Maserati during the practice sessions.
- Antony Powys-Lybbe claimed not to remember entering - certainly he did not turn up.

== Classification ==
=== Starting grid positions ===
1st Row	1 Pos.		2 Pos.		3 Pos.		4 Pos.
	(Germany) von Brauchitsch; Mercedes-Benz; 2:10.4		(Germany); Rosemeyer; Auto Union; 2:11.4		(Germany); Lang; Mercedes-Benz; 2:14.3		(United Kingdom); Seaman; Mercedes-Benz; 2:15.4
2nd Row		1 Pos.		2 Pos.		3 Pos.	
		(Germany); Müller; Auto Union; 2:15.4		(Germany); Caracciola; Mercedes-Benz; 2:15.8		(Germany); Hasse; Auto Union; 2:19.0	
3rd Row	1 Pos.		2 Pos.		3 Pos.		4 Pos.
	(Thailand); Bira; Maserati; 2:25.0		(United Kingdom); Mays; ERA; 2:26.2		(United Kingdom); Howe; ERA; 2:26.2		(United Kingdom); Hanson; Maserati; 2:27.6
4th Row		1 Pos.		2 Pos.		3 Pos.	
		(United Kingdom); Dobson; ERA; 2:28.4		(United Kingdom); Martin; ERA; 2:31.6		(United Kingdom); Whitehead; ERA; 2:32.0	
5th Row			1 Pos.				
			(United Kingdom); Maclure; Riley; 2:35.2				

Notes:

- Hyde withdrew after practice, thinking he was too slow; he had set the 16th fastest time.
- Although Whitehead started, the qualifying time was set by Walker; Whitehead's time would have placed him behind Hyde.

=== Race ===
Pos	No	Driver	Constructor	Laps	Time/Retired	Grid
1	5	(Germany) Bernd Rosemeyer	Auto Union	80	3:01:02.5	2
2	3	(Germany) Manfred von Brauchitsch	Mercedes-Benz	80	+37.5	1
3	1	(Germany) Rudolf Caracciola	Mercedes-Benz	80	+ 1:16.3	6
4	7	(Germany) Hermann Paul Müller	Auto Union	80	+3:47.5	6
5	6	(Germany) Rudolf Hasse	Auto Union	80	+ 8:47.5	7
6	8	(Thailand) Prince Bira	Maserati	78	+ 2 Laps	11
NC	9	(United Kingdom) Earl Howe	ERA	77	+ 3 Laps	10
NC	19	(United Kingdom) Arthur Dobson	ERA	74	+ 6 Laps	12
NC	15	(United Kingdom) Robin Hanson	Maserati	72	+ 8 Laps	11
Ret	20	(United Kingdom) Percy Maclure	Riley	67	Rear axle	15
Ret	8	(United Kingdom) Raymond Mays	ERA	51	Brakes	9
Ret	4	(United Kingdom) Richard Seaman	Mercedes-Benz	29	Rear suspension	4
Ret	2	(Germany) Hermann Lang	Mercedes-Benz	26	Front shock absorber	3
Ret	18	(United Kingdom) Charles Martin	ERA	18	Piston	13
Ret	16	(United Kingdom) Peter Whitehead	ERA	11	Engine	14
DNS	16	(United Kingdom) Peter Walker	ERA			
DNS	12	(United Kingdom) Arthur Hyde	Maserati			
DNS	2	(Switzerland) Christian Kautz	Mercedes-Benz			

Grand Prix Race
1937 Grand Prix season
Previous race: 1936 Donington Grand Prix	Donington Grand Prix	Next race: 1938 Donington Grand Prix
