= Donington Grand Prix =

Grand Prix auto race held in UK

- Donington Park

Race information
- Number of times held: 4
- First held: 1935
- Last held: 1938
- Most wins (constructors): (Italy) Alfa Romeo (2) (Germany) Auto Union (2)
- Circuit length: 5 km (3.125 miles)
- Race length: 400 km (250 miles)
- Laps: 80

Last race (1938)

Pole position
- (Germany) Hermann Lang; Mercedes-Benz; 2:11.0

Podium
- 1. (Italy) Tazio Nuvolari; Auto Union; 3hr06m22s; 2. (Germany) Hermann Lang; Mercedes-Benz; + 1m38s; 3. (United Kingdom) Richard Seaman; Mercedes-Benz; +1 lap

Fastest lap
- (Italy) Tazio Nuvolari; Auto Union; 2:14.4

The Donington Grand Prix was a Grand Prix motor race held at the Donington Park circuit in Leicestershire, England, from 1935 to 1938.

The Donington Grand Prix was held just four times, but quickly rose to prominence as one of the most important races in Europe. A fifth race was planned for 1939 but was cancelled due to the start of World War II.

== Winners ==
Year	Driver	Constructor	Report
1935	(United Kingdom) Richard Shuttleworth	Alfa Romeo	Report
1936	(Switzerland) Hans Rüesch (United Kingdom) Richard Seaman	Alfa Romeo	Report
1937	(Germany) Bernd Rosemeyer	Auto Union	Report
1938	(Italy) Tazio Nuvolari	Auto Union	Report
1939	Race cancelled due to World War II		

== History ==
The first edition of the Donington Grand Prix took place on 5 October 1935. Circuit renovations were undertaken in preparation for the event, these included improving the spectator lot, installing loud speakers, and erecting new bridges at Coppice-lane, Redgate Corner and the Starkey Hairpin.

The 1939 edition of the race was originally scheduled for 30 September, with Mercedes-Benz and Auto Union cars scheduled to enter, but was cancelled on 8 September due to World War II. The circuit was closed in 1939 due to the war, when it was requisitioned by the Ministry of Defence and was converted into a military vehicle depot.

=== Post-war ===
The circuit reopened in 1977. The Donington Grand Prix Collection was created at the circuit which included cars from the Pre-war races, including a 1939 Auto Union car, which did not compete at the circuit, but did mark the first time that an Auto Union car had returned to the circuit following the 1938 Grand Prix. Historic races were organised for 1979 and 1980, these included Pre-war events to commemorate the early Donington Grand Prix races.

The circuit returned to hosting Grand Prix racing with the one-off 1993 European Grand Prix.

== Legacy ==
Although not considered an official British Grand Prix, the Donington Grand Prix is widely regarded as being on a similar level of importance. It was the only major international Grand Prix held in the United Kingdom during the 1930s, and paved the way for the United Kingdom's rise to international prominence in Grand Prix Racing after the second World War.
