= Maurice Harvey (racing driver) =

British racing driver (1895–1936)

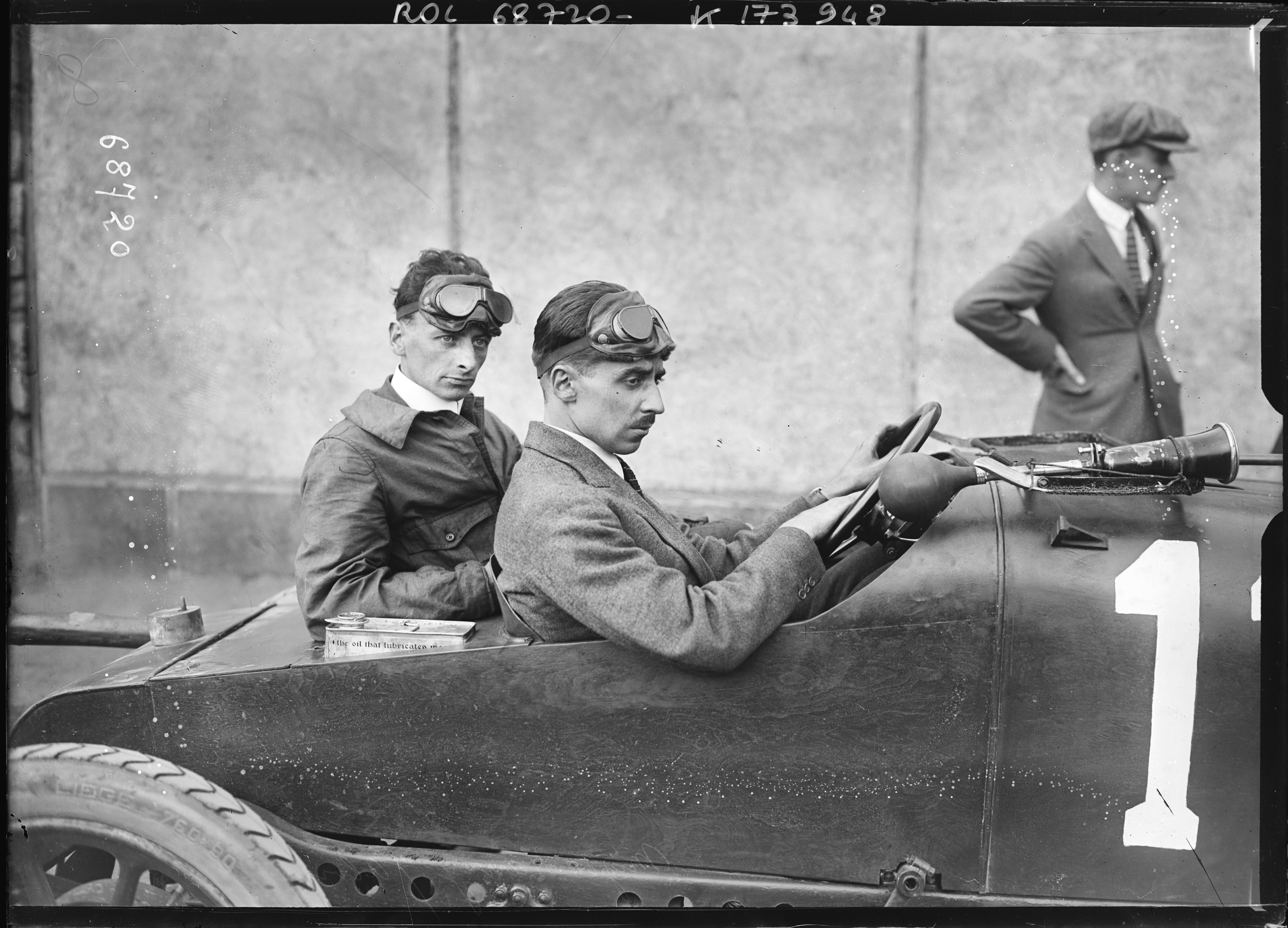
- Harvey at the weighbridge for the 1921 Coupe des Voiturettes at Le Mans
- Born: Cyril Maurice Harvey; 19 February 1895 Balham, England
- Died: 2 August 1936 (aged 41) St Keverne, England

Major Maurice Harvey (19 February 1895 – 2 August 1936) was a British racing driver, active before the Second World War.

== Career ==
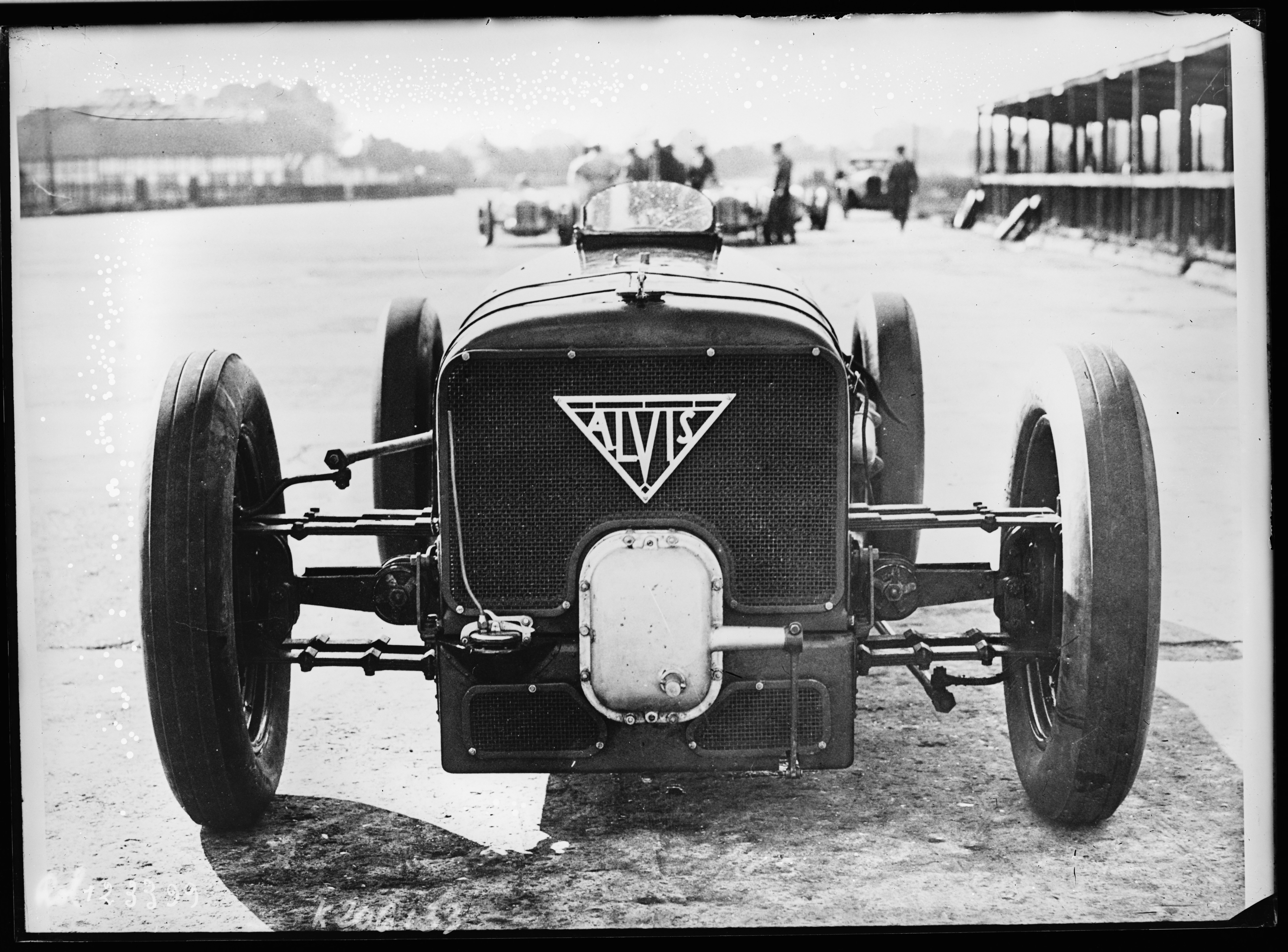
Harvey's low-slung Grand Prix Alvis, at Brooklands in 1927

Harvey raced A.C.s before the First World War, and set speed records at Brooklands for the Silver Hawk marque in 1920, before becoming chief competition driver and service manager at Alvis. His first important victory for Alvis was in the J.C.C. 200 at Brooklands in 1923, driving an Alvis 12/50 at an average speed of over 93mph. In 1925, at the Shelsley Walsh hillclimb, he recorded the second fastest time in the new 1.5 litre Alvis, a mere 0.4 seconds behind Henry Segrave in his Grand Prix Sunbeam.

Alvis produced Grand Prix cars in 1926; they were withdrawn from the 1926 British Grand Prix as they were not yet ready. They were present for the 1927 British Grand Prix, but Harvey's model broke an oil pump in practice, so was a non-starter.

Harvey made his debut in the 24 Hours of Le Mans in 1928, finishing 6th overall in a 4-cylinder FWD Alvis with Harold Purdy, and winning the 1.5 litre class. He continued racing after Alvis withdrew from the sport in 1930, winning his class in the 1931 RAC Tourist Trophy and 1931 Le Mans 24 Hours in an Aston Martin.

== Death ==
In July 1936, Harvey went to Cornwall on a camping holiday, to recover from a bout of ill health which had forced him to retire from racing. On 2 August 1936, Harvey was found in his tent, killed by a gunshot wound, with the gun by his side. An inquest returned a verdict of suicide while of unsound mind, the result of trauma suffered during his First World War service, in which he had been a prisoner of war for six months, and had suffered damaged lungs from a gas attack; he had also recently separated from his wife.

== Le Mans record ==
Year	Team	Co-Drivers	Car	Class	Laps	Pos.	Class Pos.
1928	(United Kingdom) Alvis	(United Kingdom) Harold Purdy	Alvis TA	1.5	132	6th	1st
1931	(United Kingdom) Aston Martin	(Italy) A. C. Bertelli	Aston Martin LM7	1.5	131	5th	1st
