= Charlie Martin (racing driver, born 1913) =

British racing driver (1913–1998)

- Born: Charles Edward Capel Martin; 21 April 1913 Abergavenny, Wales
- Died: 19 February 1998 (aged 84) Chelsea, London

Charles Edward Capel Martin (21 April 1913 – 19 February 1998) was an auto racing driver from Wales.

== Motor racing career ==
=== Early career ===
Martin came from a family which made its fortune in steelworks at Abergavenny, and attended Eton College, where he was introduced to motorcycles. Having been bitten by the motoring bug, rather than attending university, he undertook an engineering apprenticeship at Austin in Birmingham, and in 1932 made his racing debut on the Southport sands in a Riley Nine. On 1932 he used a Bugatti Type 37 in hillclimbs and a generous aunt bought him an MG F-type in 1933; his success with the car at Brooklands gained him works support.

By 1935 Martin had enough experience to seek a Grand Prix career and, with Charles Brackenbury, even approached Auto Union to see if any cars were for sale. Turned down by the German marque, Martin ended up with the first Bugatti Type 59, which generally proved unreliable, but he did record 3rd place in the 1935 Donington Grand Prix, having led with 20 of the 120 laps remaining, before grabbing brakes sent him off the road and costing him several minutes. The same year he and Brackenbury took a class win in the 1935 24 Hours of Le Mans for Aston Martin, the car (LM20) taking third overall, as well as the Index of Performance and Coupe Biennale. At the end of the 1935 season, Martin sold the Bugatti to the Duke of Grafton, who was killed in it, and Martin bought an Alfa Romeo P3 from Luis Fontes.

=== Grands Prix ===
Martin used the Alfa in 1936 Grands Prix races, and bought an E.R.A. (R3A), which he painted red, for voiturette races. At the 1936 Eifelrennen, he overturned the Alfa at Brünnchen, but escaped serious injury; at the 1936 Hungarian Grand Prix he retired from sixth at three-fifths distance with a broken axle. Once more his best season performance came at Donington, with a second at the 1936 Donington Grand Prix, which matched his result at the 1936 Pau Grand Prix, where he ran out of time to catch Philippe Etancelin's ailing Maserati. However his greatest triumph came at the 1936 International 500 Miles Race at Brooklands, sharing Freddie Dixon's 2-litre Riley to victory.

=== Voiturettes ===
With a better prize-money ratio available in the smaller category, Martin stepped back from Grand Prix racing in 1937, other than at the Donington Grand Prix. He won the voiturette race at the Avus at the start of the season, but a mistake on compression values led to him finishing 5th at the voiturette race supporting Swiss Grand Prix; at the Czech Grand Prix voiturette race, Martin ran second behind Luigi Villoresi near the end, but fouled plugs slowed him up.

At the close of the season, Martin gave up motor racing, selling his equipment to Jack Bartlett, and moved to Brighton to concentrate on boating.

== Second World War ==
In 1941 Martin moved to Felixstowe, from where he worked ferrying weapons, agents, and stores to the French coast; his service saw him promoted to Lieutenant and awarded the Distinguished Service Cross, and, for his work off Omaha Beach on D-Day, the American Legion of Merit.

Towards the end of his life he served as the Vice-President of the Brooklands Society.
