= Dunans =

Dunans refers to a former estate in Glendaruel, Cowal, Scotland. Structures with the name include:

- Dunans Castle, formerly Dunans house.
- Dunans Bridge, a Thomas Telford bridge, the latest of a number of bridges on the same site.
