= Percy Maclure =

British racing driver (1907-44)

- Born: Percival William Maclure; 13 November 1907 Skipton, Yorkshire
- Died: 15 December 1944 (aged 37) Hatton, Warwickshire

Percival William "Percy" Maclure (13 November 1907 – 15 December 1944) was a British racing driver.

== Career ==
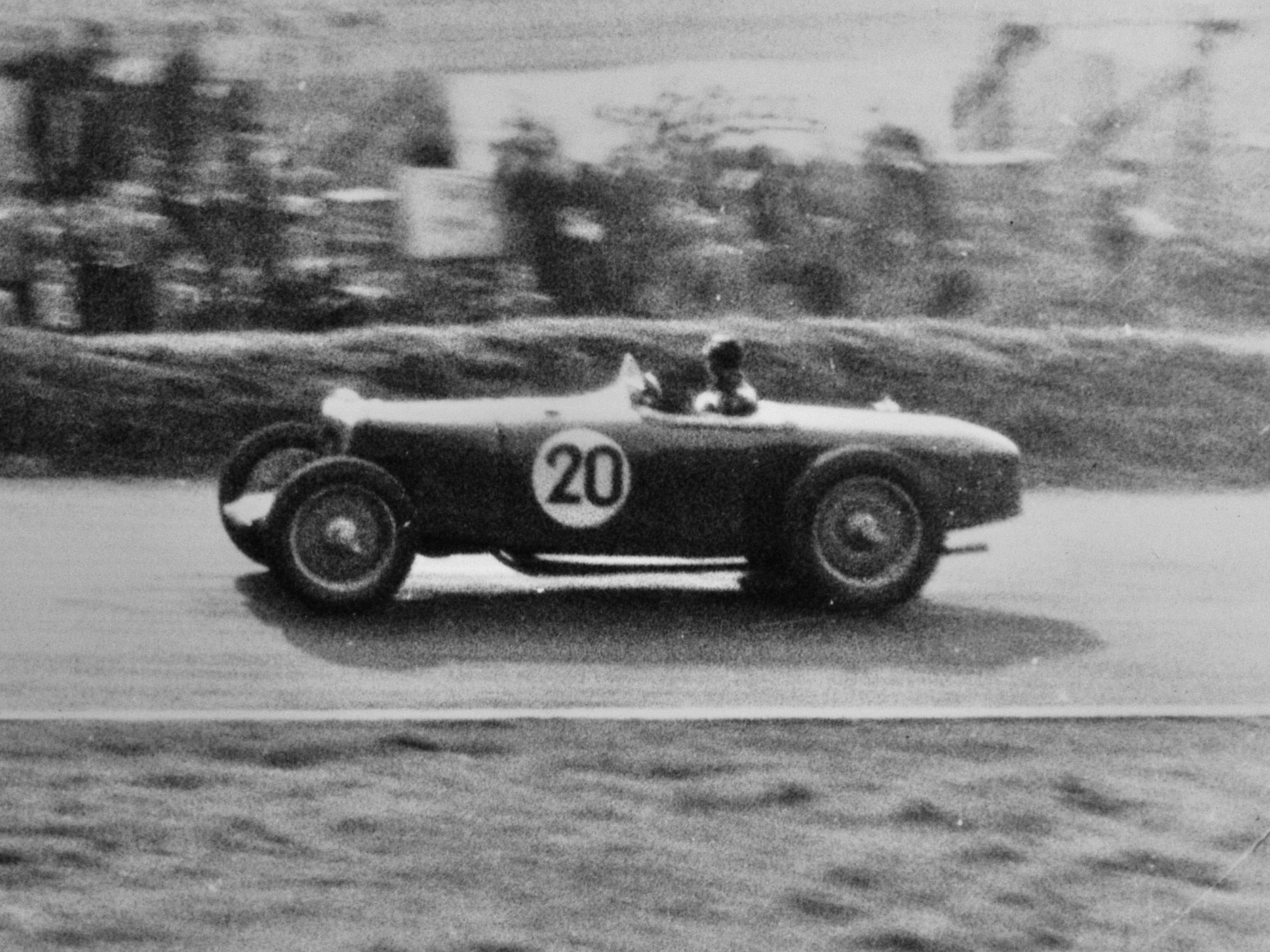
Percy Maclure in his 2 litre Riley at the 1937 Donington Grand Prix; he would retire near the end while running 8th.

Maclure was a mechanic who worked for Riley, along with his brother Edgar; their father Gustave had been an engineer with Rolls Royce and Riley. This enabled him to receive some works support when he started racing Rileys, but was also responsible himself for many of his modifications, which he carried out at a workshop in Fillongley, near Coventry. His modifications included inventing a bespoke independent front suspension, and even building a miniature Riley for his young brother Peter. Maclure was also notable behind the wheel for not wearing a helmet or cap when racing, but simply slicking back his hair with grease. Edgar was the senior Maclure, and Percy's first race of note was the 1928 RAC Tourist Trophy race in Northern Ireland, as reserve driver for Edgar's Riley.

"Percy Mac"'s first notable performance came in the 1934 International 500 Miles Race, when a solo drive in his Riley saw him get within 2 laps of winning, a late breakdown handing the race to Eddie Hall. His major wins included the 1937 Coronation Trophy at the Crystal Palace circuit, where he was always a crowd favourite, and the 1938 J.C.C. International Trophy at Brooklands in his Riley Nine; the International Trophy was run on a combination of the Brooklands banked and road circuits, and run to a quasi-handicap, with cars told to follow a certain line through the chicane depending on capacity. Maclure came home winner by a few lengths from Raymond Mays in his E.R.A., delayed by a pitstop and charging from 15 seconds down with five laps remaining. Maclure's achievement was particularly outstanding as he never supercharged his cars; this lack of boost was not taken into account when handicapping, and his successes in spite of this disadvantage meant he was rated as one of the finest British drivers of the era.

He also scored a class win in the 2-litre category of the 1936 French Grand Prix (run to a sportscar formula), sharing his Riley TT Sprite with Jean Trévoux, but, unlike his brother Edgar, never raced in the 24 Hours of Le Mans, although he was reserve for Lagonda for the 1939 race.

Maclure took part in the Donington Grands Prix from 1935 to 1938, the latter two counting as Grandes Epreuves, and every time driving a Riley, but did not finish any. His most prominent performance came in 1937, in which he ran as third best of the non-Silver Arrows until his rear axle broke late on, but, having completed 67 laps, was officially classified 10th. His entry for the 1938 race was particularly important, as he was leading the points competition run by the British Motor Racing Organisers' Association (a separate championship from the B.R.D.C. Gold Star title) by two points from Humphrey Cuddon-Fletcher, and starting the Grand Prix was worth three points; Cuddon-Fletcher also entered the Grand Prix, in a "winner take all" challenge, and, as both cars retired, Maclure took the title (and the £250 prize money), Arthur Dobson finishing third.

"Percy Mac" was one of three British drivers invited by Prince Bira to take part in a race in Siam, pencilled in for the end of the year, along with Mays and the Hon. Peter Aitken, but the Second World War intervened. Maclure employed his engineering skills in war work by working in inspection at an aircraft factory.

== Death ==
Maclure died in 1944 after suffering from tuberculosis for several months.

== External sites ==
- Results
