= Richard Seaman =

British racing driver (1913–1939)

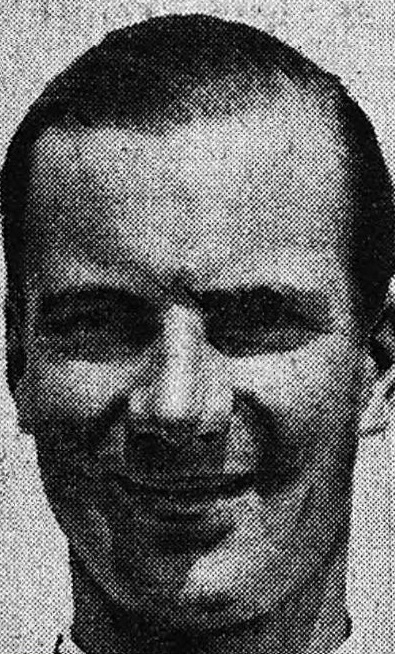
- Seaman, circa 1939
- Born: Richard John Beattie Seaman; 4 February 1913 Chichester, Sussex, England
- Died: 25 June 1939 (aged 26) Spa, Liège, Belgium

European Championship career
- Years active: 1935–1939
- Teams: Scuderia Torino, Mercedes-Benz
- Starts: 7
- Championships: 0
- Wins: 1
- Podiums: 2
- Poles: 1
- Fastest laps: 2

Champ Car career
- 1 race run over 1 year
- Best finish: 6th (1937)
- First race: 1937 Vanderbilt Cup (Westbury)
Wins	Podiums	Poles
0	1	0

Richard John Beattie Seaman (4 February 1913 – 25 June 1939) was a British racing driver. He drove for the Mercedes-Benz team from 1937 to 1939 in the Mercedes-Benz W125 and W154 cars, winning the 1938 German Grand Prix. He died of his injuries after his car overturned at the 1939 Belgian Grand Prix.

== Early life ==
Seaman was born in Aldingbourne House near Chichester, Sussex, into a wealthy family, the son of William John Beattie-Seaman and Lillian Seaman. He initially lived at Kentwell Hall, Long Melford, Suffolk, developing an enthusiasm for motoring from his childhood. After studying at Rugby School Seaman moved onto Trinity College, Cambridge, where as a student Seaman's first experience of racing was at the 1931 Shelsley Walsh Speed Hill Climb near the Malvern Hills, won by Whitney Straight. Seaman's parents encouraged him to become a Member of Parliament or a lawyer.

During his time at Cambridge University Seaman and a friend embarked on a three-day flight to South Africa, and he often cruised around Europe with his family. His family bought Pull Court in Worcestershire in 1933, former home of the two politicians Richard Dowdeswell, father and son, as a stately home for him to inherit. In 1934 he resolved to become a racing driver and took his MG car to the European mainland to gain experience.

== Driving career ==
=== Early career ===
In his early career Seaman won the Voiturette race of the Swiss Grand Prix event at Bremgarten on his first attempt, he went on to win it three times consecutively. He won other small races for English Racing Automobiles (ERA), notably at Brooklands and Donington Park. Seaman competed in the Mont Ventoux Hill Climb after being encouraged to do so by Straight. A talented Anglo-American aristocratic racing driver, Straight, served as Seaman's friend and mentor during his early years of motor racing.

In 1935 Seaman enjoyed a fruitful year with ERA; he took pole position at the 1935 Dieppe Grand Prix, and won the junior category of the 1935 Coppa Acerbo. And he also won the Czech Masaryk Grand Prix with ERA B-Type (Voiturette) in September 1935. In his early years Seaman took part in speed trials on the Eynsham bypass near his student home of Cambridge, but by the 1936 Grand Prix Season he was more focused on Grand Prix racing.

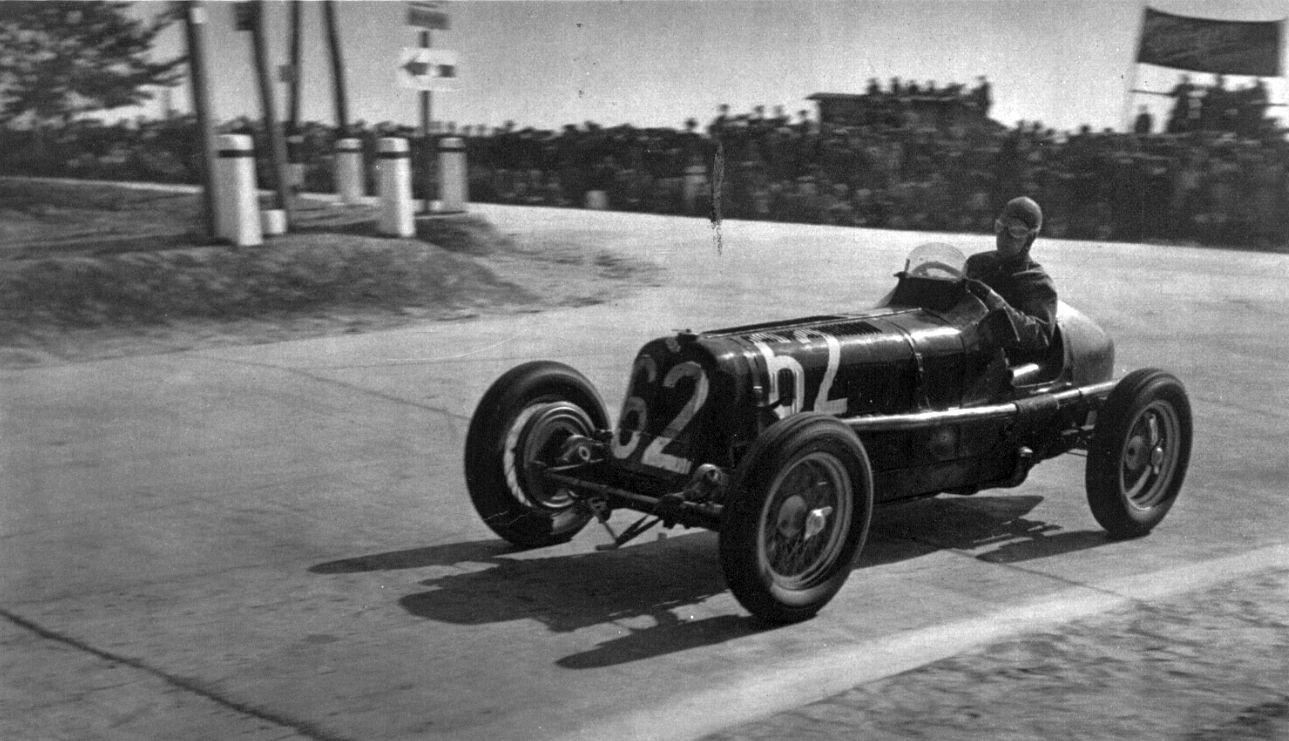
Richard Seaman in an ERA B-Type car, winner of the Voiturette category (Brno 1935)

Seaman was very successful in the 1936 season both in UK and on the Continent using a 1926 1,500 cc (92 cu in) Delage race car which was developed and modified to be almost unbeatable at the time with Seaman driving. He won the British Empire Trophy in 1936 at Donington Park in an ERA. Seaman also won the 1936 Donington Grand Prix in a Delage sharing the honor with Swiss Grand Prix driver Hans Rüesch.

Seaman competed in numerous hill climb events also, winning his class at Freiburg ADAC Schauinsland Races in 1936, impressively only a second behind the overall winner Hans Stuck in an Auto Union.

Eventually Mercedes team chief Alfred Neubauer invited him for a trial at the Nürburgring. Both Silver Arrows teams used to have at least one foreign driver, if available.

Seaman had his last outing in a Delage at the 1937 South African Grand Prix in East London from which he retired.

In 1937 he signed for Mercedes-Benz against the wishes of his mother, who did not want him to drive for a "Nazi" team. The Mercedes (and their rival Auto Union) cars, which were part of a racing program that was German government subsidized were far faster, better financed, better built, more advanced and more reliable than any of the racing cars he had driven previously. He now had a chance to win Grands Prix and be one of the top drivers in the European Grand Prix championship.

=== 1937 Grand Prix season ===
Seaman had a poor start to his Mercedes career in the 1937 Grand Prix Season, he was involved in the fatal accident of Ernst von Delius at the 1937 German Grand Prix, his injuries prevented him from competing at the following races, the Monaco Grand Prix and the Coppa Acerbo in Italy. Nonetheless, he finished fourth at the Italian Grand Prix at Livorno and repeated the feat at the non-championship Czechoslovakian Grand Prix at Brno. Neubauer demoted Seaman to reserve driver at the Swiss Grand Prix, much to his disappointment. Outside of Europe, Seaman finished second to Bernd Rosemeyer at the American Automobile Association (AAA) sanctioned Vanderbilt Cup in Long Island, New York in the United States.

=== 1938 Grand Prix season ===
Seaman improved further during the 1938 season – he won the German Grand Prix- the biggest race of the year for the German teams, and became one of the favorite drivers of Adolf Hitler, it was the first time a British driver had won an AIACR European Championship race since Henry Segrave won the 1923 French Grand Prix. After his win, Mercedes retained Seaman as a reserve driver, racing in Livorno and Pescara whilst Seaman took a break. On his return, Seaman took pole and finished second in the Swiss Grand Prix at Bremgarten, his favorite circuit, and finished third at his home Grand Prix at Donington Park following a spin. His friend and biographer, George Monkhouse, called Seaman's drive at the Swiss Grand Prix, in difficult wet conditions, the best of his career.

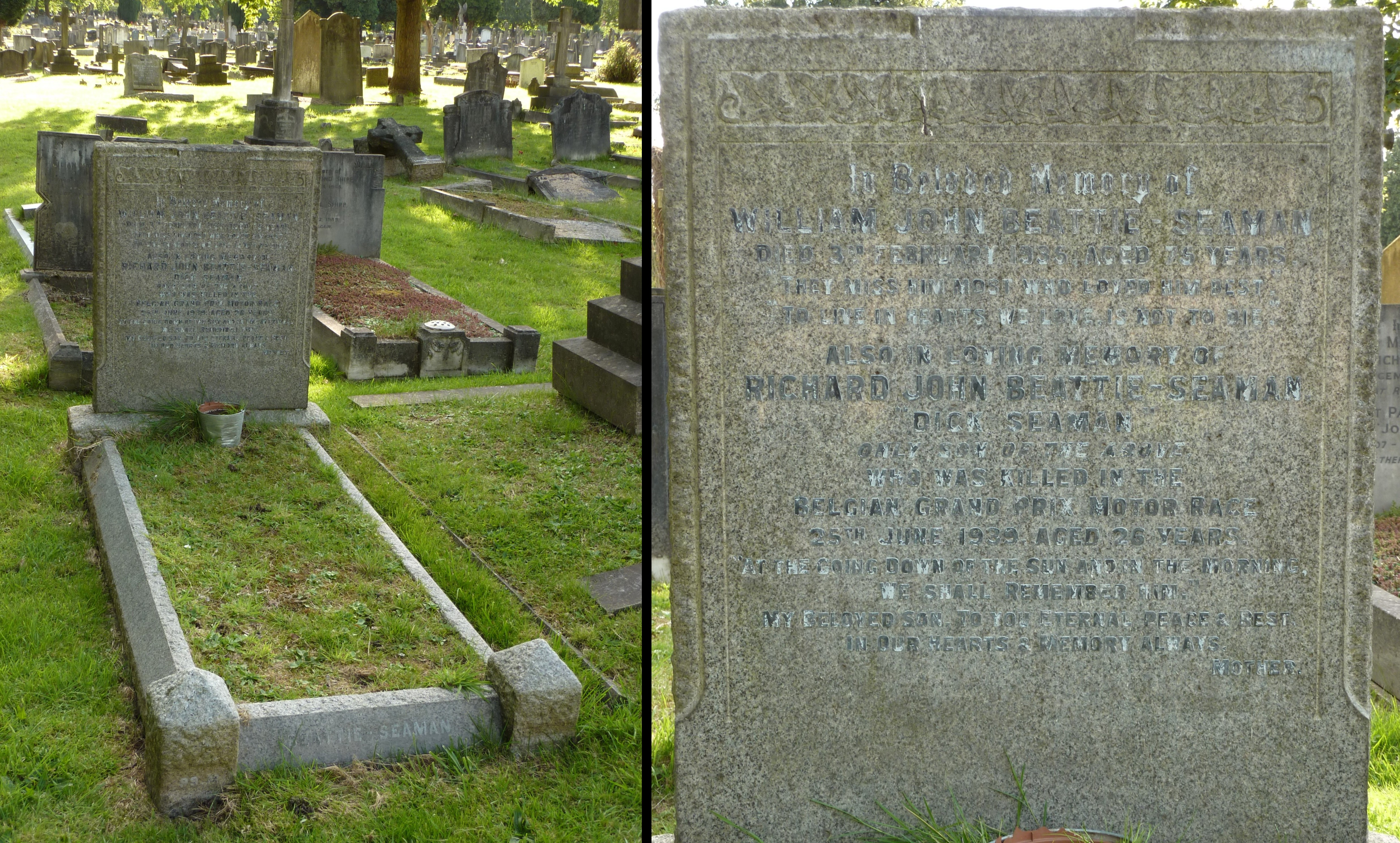
Richard Seaman's grave at Putney Vale Cemetery, London in 2014

=== 1939 Grand Prix season and death ===
Seaman had a slow start to the 1939 Grand Prix season, he attended the 1939 French Grand Prix but did not compete. Neubauer did not allow him to compete at the Tripoli Grand Prix. He competed at the 1939 Eifelrennen at the Nürburgring but retired early on with a broken clutch.

Leading the 1939 Belgian Grand Prix at Spa-Francorchamps during a wet race, Seaman crashed his car into a tree during lap 22. It is thought he was using a line through a corner that was only normally used in the dry. After the impact, the car caught fire, with the unconscious driver still inside. Seaman died a few hours later as a result of his burns; it was Mercedes' only fatality during that time. On his death bed Seaman remarked to Mercedes' chief engineer, "I was going too fast for the conditions – it was entirely my own fault. I am sorry."

After Seaman's death, Mercedes-Benz dealerships worldwide were ordered to display his photograph in their windows. Richard Seaman was buried at Putney Vale Cemetery in London. A memorial stone commemorating Seaman was installed at Spa-Francorchamps; it later went missing and was never located.

== Personal life ==
Seaman had a difficult relationship with his mother Lillian, who did not support his decision to drive for a "foreign" team, especially one influenced by the Nazi Party. Seaman fell out of love with his home, Pull Court, following his inability to find local staff to service a planned party involving Seaman's Grand Prix compatriots; Prince Bira was to be invited.

Seaman divided most of his time between Worcestershire and London; spending a large amount of money on travel, he often enjoyed waterskiing.

As a wealthy aristocrat Seaman got along well with his fellow Mercedes Grand Prix teammates Manfred von Brauchitsch and Rudolf Caracciola, who were from wealthy German families.

In December 1938, Seaman married Erica Popp, the daughter of the director of BMW, again against his mother's wishes. Seaman was 25 and Popp was 18. His new father in law bought the couple a home in Bavaria as a wedding present.

Following Seaman's death, Popp spent the Second World War in the UK and the U.S. In 1940 she was engaged to fellow Grand Prix driver Reggie Tongue but the couple never married. She married twice again, and died in Sarasota, Florida in February 1990 at the age of 69. She wore her engagement ring bought by Seaman for the rest of her life.

== Legacy ==
Seaman is often viewed along with Henry Segrave as one of Britain's greatest pre-war Grand Prix drivers. Mythology surrounds Seaman's association with Pull Court. One rumor holds that Seaman's Mercedes Grand Prix cars are buried in the estate; another holds that his mother, Lillian Seaman, left the lights at Pull Court on during the Second World War to guide German bombers.

In his autobiography, Mercedes teammate Hermann Lang described Seaman as "kind-hearted, cool and fair as a sportsman, just as I has always pictured Englishmen to be."

Although biographer Richard Williams has stated that Seaman simply wanted to drive for whichever team had the fastest car, irrespective of politics, Seaman's legacy has been tarnished by his association with Nazism. Seaman was privately complimentary of Hitler, and controversially gave a Nazi salute - albeit a "distinctly unemphatic version" more like a casual wave - following his victory at the 1938 German Grand Prix. Moreover, the largest wreath at Seaman's funeral was sent by Hitler, against the wishes of the driver's family.

== Motorsports career results ==
=== European Championship results ===
(key) (Races in bold indicate pole position; races in italics indicate fastest lap)

Year	Entrant	Chassis	Engine	1	2	3	4	5	EDC	Pts
1936	Scuderia Torino	Maserati V8RI	Maserati 4.8 V8	MON	GER; Ret	SUI	ITA		28th	31
1937	Daimler-Benz AG	Mercedes W125	Mercedes 5.7 L8	BEL	GER; Ret	MON; DNS	SUI	ITA; 4	15th	34
1938	Daimler-Benz AG	Mercedes W154	Mercedes 3.0 V12	FRA	GER; 1	**SUI**; 2	ITA; Ret		4th	18
1939	Daimler-Benz AG	Mercedes W154	Mercedes 3.0 V12	BEL; Ret	FRA	GER	SUI		25th	29
