= A. B. Hyde =

British racing driver (1915–2005)

- Born: Arthur Brookes Hyde; 4 September 1915 Highbury, London
- Died: 4 September 2005 (aged 90) Charlotte, North Carolina

Arthur Brookes Hyde was a British racing driver, who drove in one Grand Prix before the Second World War. In common with the convention of the time, he was almost always referred to in contemporaneous reports as A. B. Hyde.

== Career ==
Hyde started his working life as an apprentice with Riley, and took part in racing as a pure amateur, originally in a Riley 9. In 1937 he bought a Maserati 8C 3000 from Thomas Cholmondeley-Tapper to step up to Grand Prix racing. He entered and practised for the 1937 British Grand Prix, notably driving bare-headed, and was second slowest in practice, setting a best time of 2'32" as against the fastest time of 2'10.8 of Manfred von Brauchitsch in his Mercedes-Benz W125, with only Peter Whitehead in an E.R.A. slower, although Hyde was praised for "putting up a very good show". However, fearing that he would get in the way, Hyde withdrew from the race - a move considered "very sporting but quite unnecessary".

The following April he drove "an admirable race" to finish 3rd in the Campbell Trophy at Brooklands, in a small but strong field, albeit the race lasted less than 20 minutes. Duly encouraged, three months later, he made his sole Grand Prix start in the 1938 German Grand Prix, still in his Maserati, but suffered a serious crash, which sent him to hospital with concussion. He recovered enough to attend the J.C.C. 200 Miles race at Donington Park the following month but was a non-starter.

Hyde's greatest achievement was finishing 3rd in the 1939 British Empire Trophy at Donington in his by-now extremely aged Maserati, but that was his last race of note; he attended the last Brooklands meeting in August, retiring from the Campbell Trophy, and he did not resume racing after the War.

== Later life ==
Hyde ran his own garage, and during the War worked "on the engineering side of pest control", before taking up farming (unsuccessfully) and reverting to engineering at various car companies. In 1956 he moved to Felixstowe to work as a checker at the docks, and in 1960 emigrated to Florida to work as a fitter in a Jaguar dealership. He died in North Carolina in 2005.
