= Rudolf Hasse =

German racing driver (1906–1942)

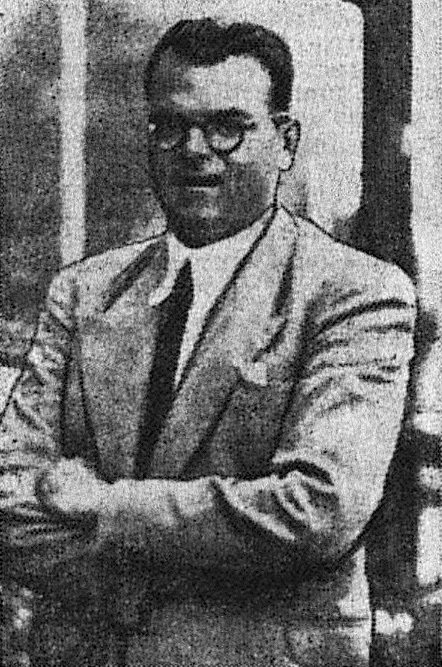
Rudolf Hasse in 1937

Rudolf Hasse (30 May 1906 – 12 August 1942) was a German racing driver who won the 1937 Belgian Grand Prix.

Hasse was born in Mittweida, Saxony, and died while serving on the Russian front during World War II in a military hospital in Makiivka, Ukraine, from shigellosis aged only 36. In the 1930s, he was a member of the National Socialist Motor Corps.

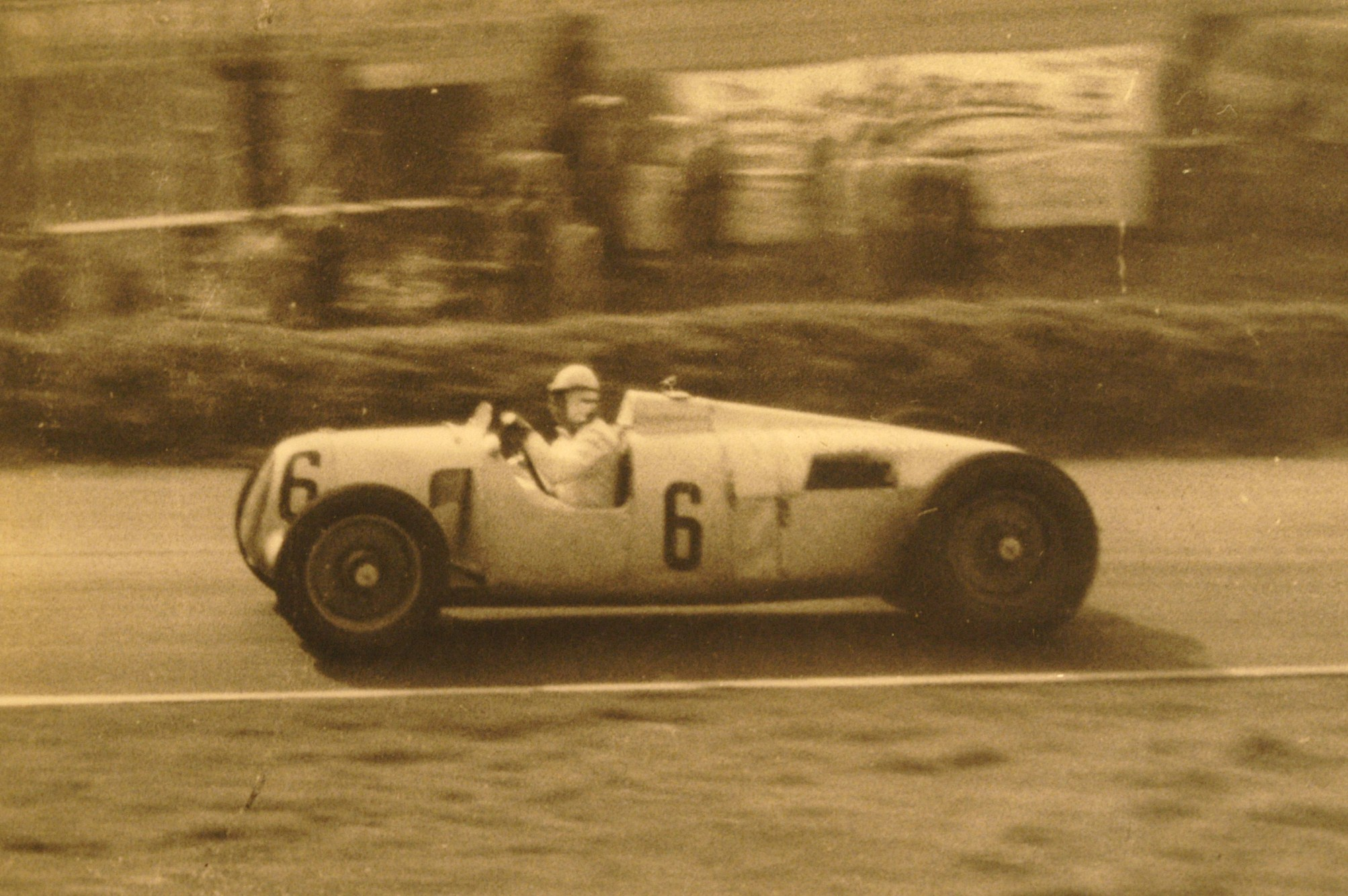
Hasse driving an Auto Union at the 1937 Donington Grand Prix. He finished fifth.
