= Maserati 8CM =

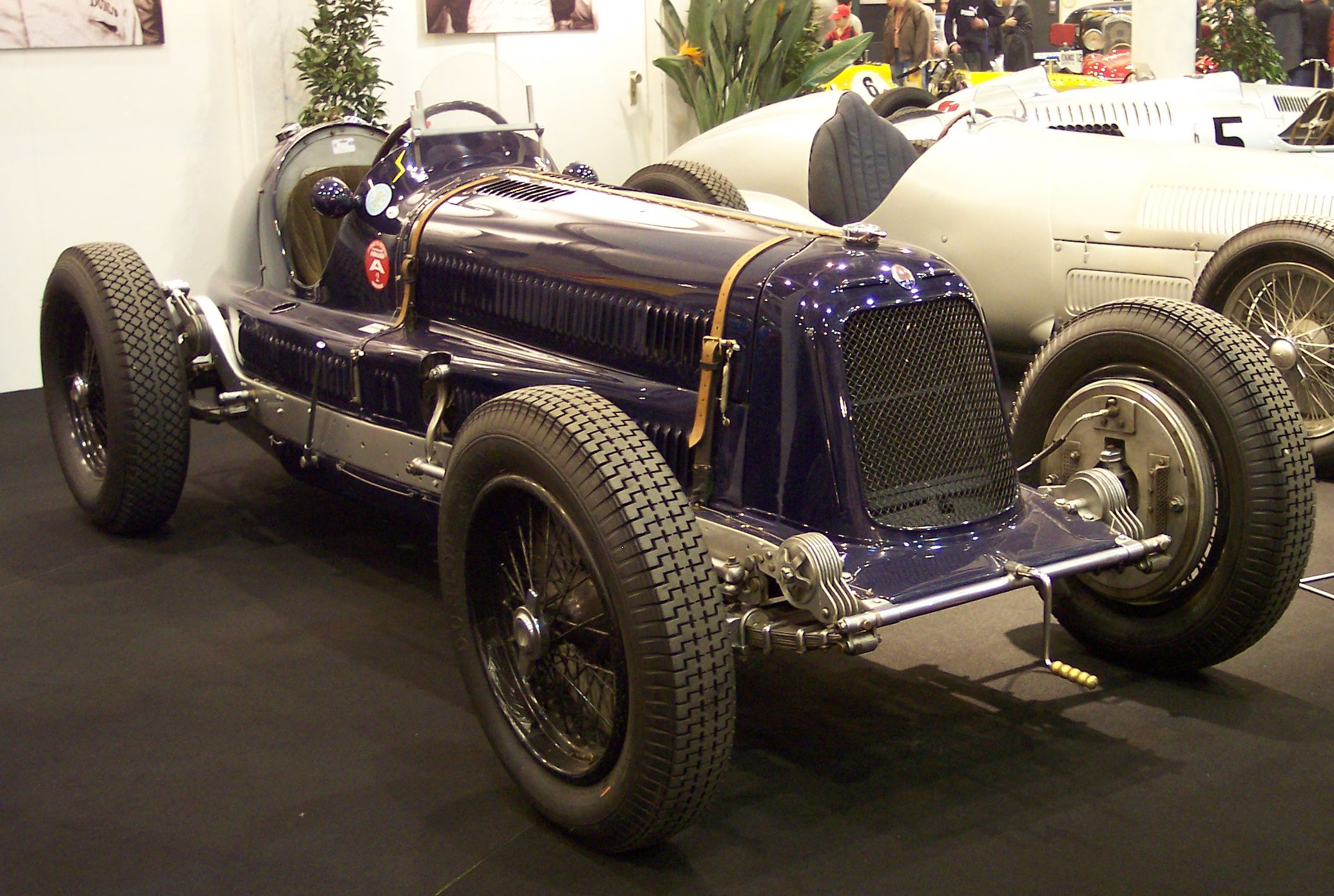
- Maserati 8CM

Overview
- Manufacturer: Maserati
- Production: 1933-1935

Body and chassis
- Class: Race car
- Layout: FR layout

Powertrain
- Engine: 3.0 L I8
- Transmission: 4-speed manual

Dimensions
- Wheelbase: 2560 mm
- Curb weight: 750–785 kg (1,653–1,731 lb)

Chronology
- Predecessor: Maserati 8C
- Successor: Maserati 6C 34

The Maserati 8CM is a Grand Prix race car produced by Italian manufacturer Maserati in Bologna between 1933 and 1935.

The car mounted a three-litre straight-eight cylinder engine, 2,991 cc from a 69 x 100 mm bore and stroke, maximum power was around 220–240 hp (162–177 kW) at 5,500 rpm. The drum brakes measure 400 mm in diameter. The chassis had been derived from that of the 4CM 1100, which proved to be too light and was subject to flex; the situation improved when driver Tazio Nuvolari asked for a strengthening at the front while the weight was reduced from 785 to 750 kg.

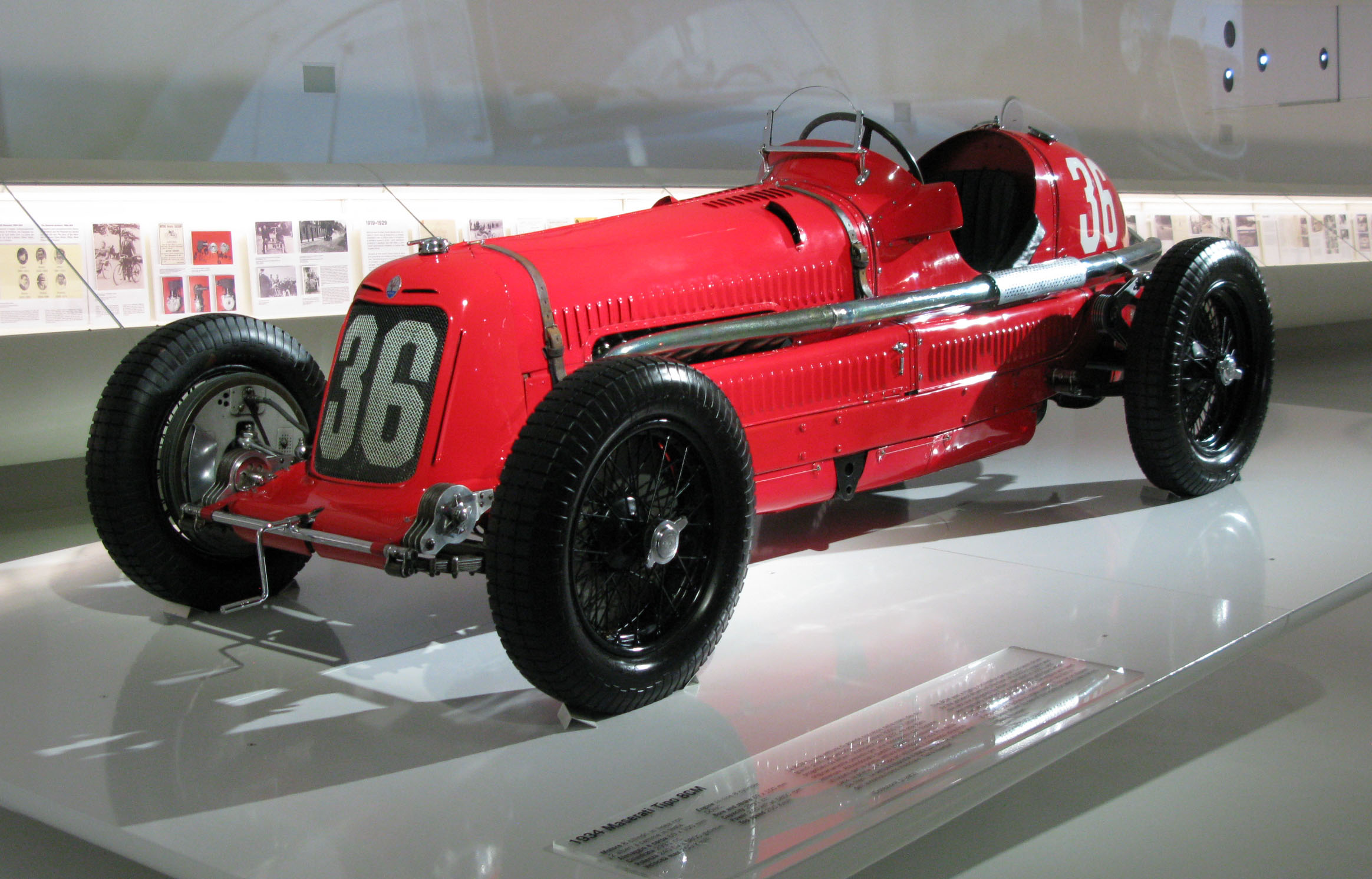
1934 Maserati 8CM (driven by Tazio Nuvolari)

The car debuted at the Tunis Grand Prix in 1933 and also won the 1933 Belgian Grand Prix, driven by Nuvolari. In 1934 and 1935, however, it struggled to match the pace of the Alfa Romeo, Mercedes and Auto Union, and was replaced by the 6C 34 and the V8RI model.

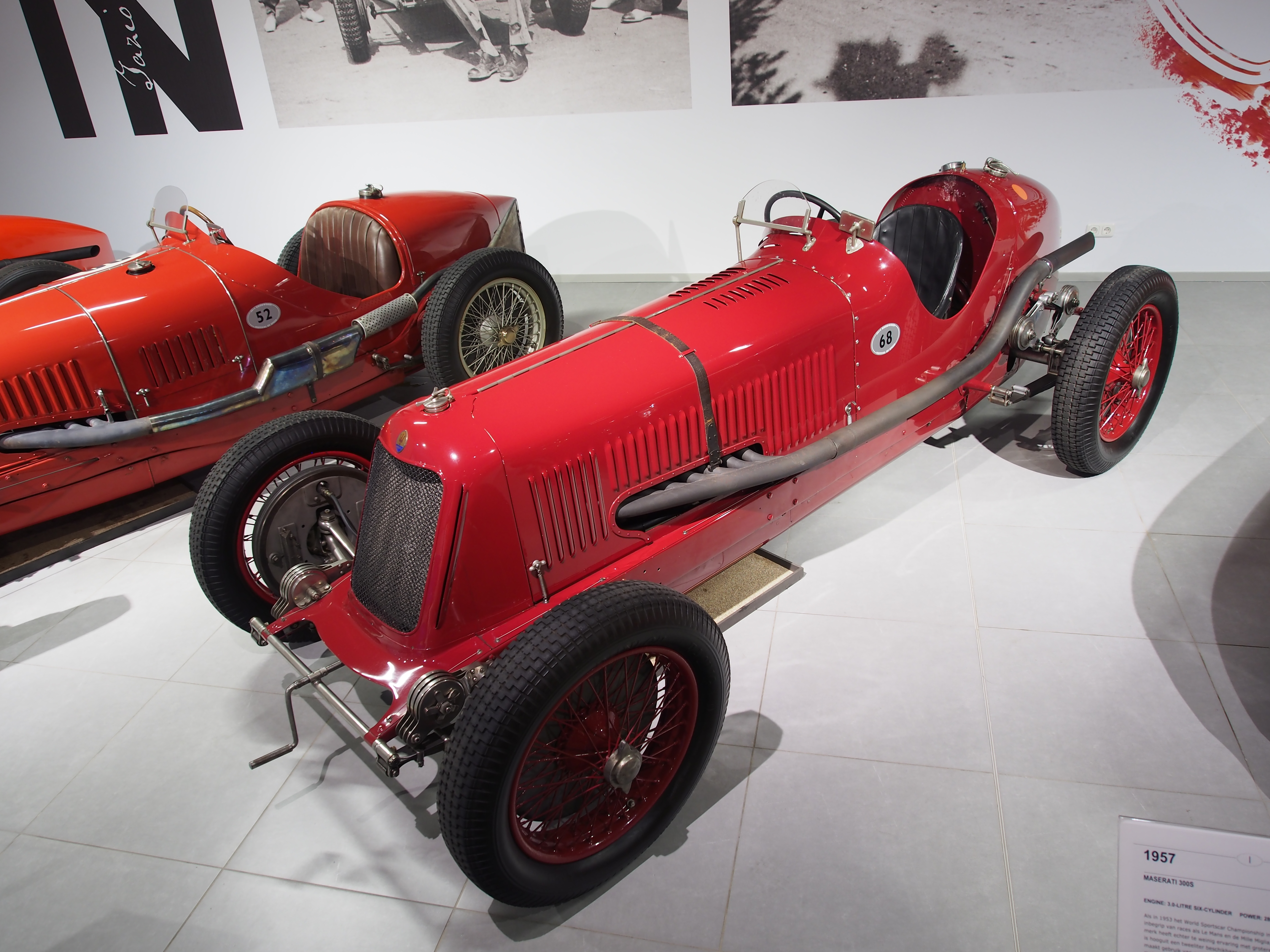
1933 Maserati 8CM

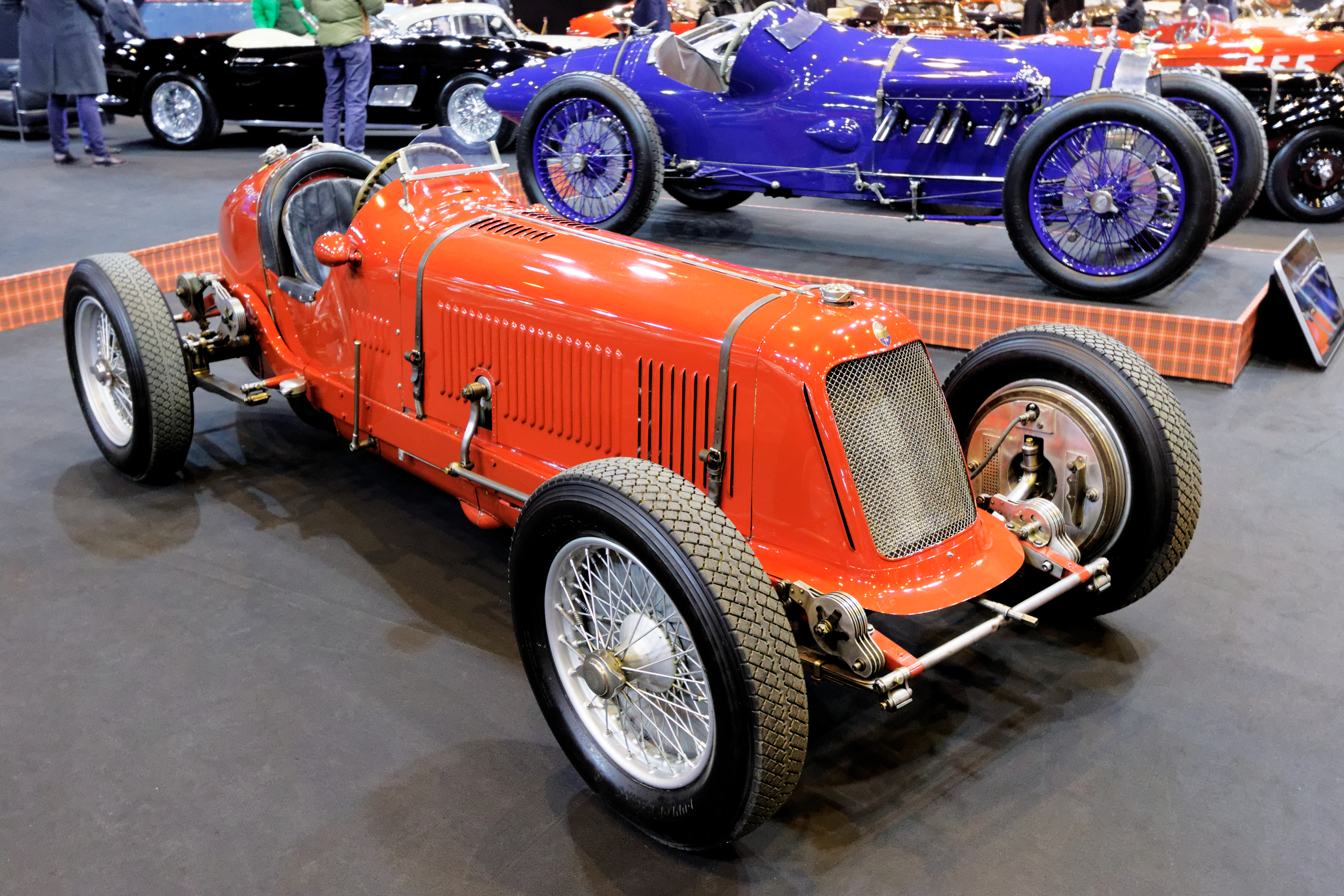
1934 Maserati 8CM

== Technical Data ==
Technical data	8CM
Engine:	Front mounted 8-cylinder in-line engine
displacement:	2991 cc
Bore x stroke:	69 x 100 mm
Max power at rpm:	240 hp (177 kW) at 5,800 rpm
Valve control:	2 overhead camshafts, 2 valves per cylinder
Compression:	6.35:1
Carburetor:	Single Weber 55ASI
Upload:	Roots compressor
Gearbox:	4-speed manual
suspension front:	Stiff front axle, longitudinal leaf springs
suspension rear:	Rigid rear axle, longitudinal leaf springs
Brakes:	Hydraulic drum brakes
Chassis & body:	Box beam frame with aluminum body
Wheelbase:	2,560 mm (100.8 in)
Dry weight:	750 kg (1,653 lb)
Top speed:	250 km/h (155 mph)
