= 1935 Mannin Moar =

Grand Prix that was held at a street circuit in Douglas, Isle of Man

1935 Mannin Moar Grand Prix
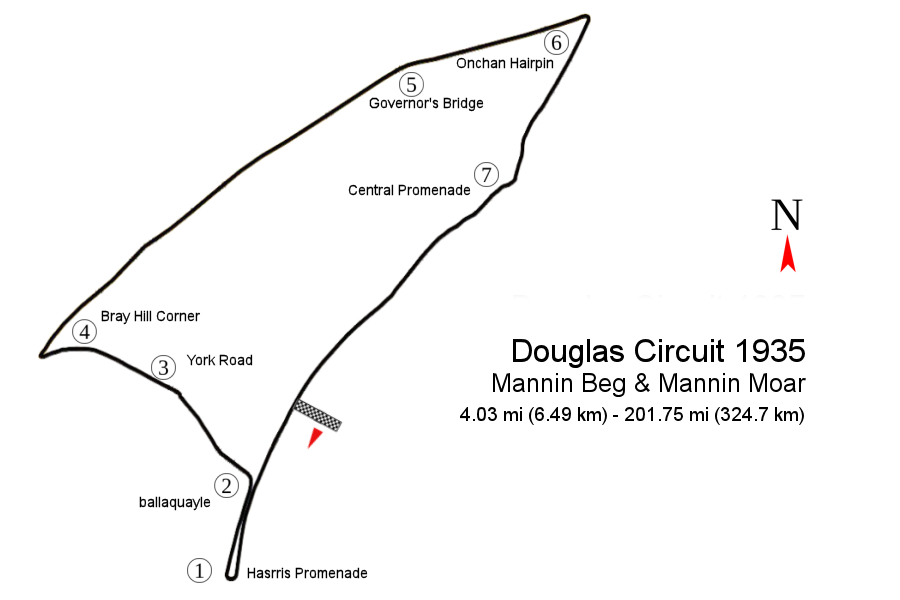

Race details
- Date: 31 May 1935
- Official name: III Mannin Moar
- Location: Douglas Circuit; Douglas, Isle of Man
- Course: Street circuit
- Course length: 6.494 km (4.035 miles)
- Distance: 50 laps, 324.7 km (201.75 miles)

Pole position
Driver	(United Kingdom) Charles Martin	C.E.C. Martin

Fastest lap
Driver	(United Kingdom) Brian Lewis	Earl Howe & N. Rees
- Time: 3:06

Podium
First	(United Kingdom) Brian Lewis	Earl Howe & N. Rees
Second	(United Kingdom) Charles Martin	C.E.C. Martin
Third	(United Kingdom) Luis Fontés	L. Fontés

The 1935 Mannin Moar (formally known as III Mannin Moar) was a Grand Prix that was held on 31 May 1935 at a street circuit in Douglas, Isle of Man. It was the thirteenth race of the 1935 Grand Prix season, but it did not count towards the championship. The race, contested over 50 laps of 4.035 mi, or 6.494 km, was won by Brian Lewis driving a Bugatti T59 after starting from pole position. He also won the two previous editions of the Mannin Moar.

== Entries ==
No.	Driver	Entrant	Car	DNA/DNS
1	(United Kingdom) Anthony Hamilton	A. Hamilton	Alfa Romeo 8C 2300 Monza	
2	(United Kingdom) Dick Wilkins	R. Wilkins	Alfa Romeo 8C 2300 Monza	
3	(United Kingdom) Dick Shuttleworth	R. Shuttleworth	Alfa Romeo Tipo B	
4	(United Kingdom) Austin Dobson	A. Dobson	Alfa Romeo 8C 2300 Monza	
4	(United Kingdom) Arthur Dobson	A. Dobson	Alfa Romeo 8C 2300 Monza	DNS - Austin Dobson started in his car
5	(United Kingdom) Luis Fontés	L. Fontes	Alfa Romeo 8C 2300 Monza	
6	(United Kingdom) Tim Rose-Richards	T. Rose-Richards	Maserati 8C	
7	(United Kingdom) Brian Lewis	Earl Howe & N. Rees	Bugatti T59	
8	(United Kingdom) Andrew Leitch	A. Leitch	Bugatti T35B	
9	(United Kingdom) Lindsay Eccles	L. Eccles	Bugatti T59	
10	(United Kingdom) Charlie Martin	C.E.C. Martin	Bugatti T59	
11	(United Kingdom) Charles Brackenbury	C.E.C. Martin	Bugatti T51	
12	(United Kingdom) Richard Seaman	R. Seaman	Maserati 8CM	DNA
14	(United Kingdom) Humphrey Cook	H.W. Cook	ERA A-Type	
15	(United Kingdom) Raymond Mays	H.W. Cook	ERA A-Type	
16	(United Kingdom) Teddy Rayson	E. Rayson	Bugatti T51	

- DNA = Did Not Arrive
- DNS = Did Not Start

== Starting positions ==
Pos.	Driver	Car constructor
1	Charlie Martin	Bugatti
2	Dick Shuttleworth	Alfa Romeo
3	Brian Lewis	Bugatti
4	Luis Fontés	Alfa Romeo
5	Lindsay Eccles	Bugatti
6	Tim Rose-Richards	Maserati
7	Raymond Mays	ERA
8	Charles Brackenbury	Bugatti
9	Teddy Rayson	Bugatti
10	Humphrey Cook	ERA
11	Andrew Leitch	Bugatti
12	Anthony Hamilton	Alfa Romeo
13	Dick Wilkins	Alfa Romeo
14	Austin Dobson	Alfa Romeo

== Race report ==
At the start Martin fell back to third place behind Shuttleworth and Lewis. Mays at his turn had gone up to fourth place. Within ten laps three drivers had to retire - Rose-Richards because of a broken universal joint and later both Leitch and Hamilton crashed separately.

In the thirteenth lap Shuttleworth retired, leaving the podium positions open for three Bugattis - Lewis, Martin and Eccles. Mays later challenged Eccles until both ERA drivers (Mays and Cook) had to make an extra pit stop around lap thirty due to problems with their cars. However, when Eccles got transmission trouble Mays took over third position, having passed Fontés on lap forty.

But in the last lap the ERA broke down with transmission failure, so Mays retired and the last podium position - after Lewis and Martin - finally went to Fontés. This was Lewis' third Mannin Moar victory.

== Race results ==
Pos.	Driver	Car Constructor	Time (Diff.)/Status
1	Brian Lewis	Bugatti	2:40:11
2	Charlie Martin	Bugatti	+51
3	Luis Fontés	Alfa Romeo	+8:03
4	Teddy Rayson	Bugatti	+15:00
NC	Austin Dobson	Alfa Romeo	+1 lap (Flagged off)
NC	Charles Brackenbury	Bugatti	+1 lap (Flagged off)
Ret	Dick Wilkins	Alfa Romeo	+1 lap (DNF - crash)
Ret	Raymond Mays	ERA	+1 lap (DNF - universal joint)
Ret	Lindsay Eccles	Bugatti	+19 laps (DNF - universal joint)
Ret	Humphrey Cook	ERA	+20 laps (DNF - oil pump)
Ret	Dick Shuttleworth	Alfa Romeo	+37 laps (DNF - transmission)
Ret	Anthony Hamilton	Alfa Romeo	+41 laps (DNF - crash)
Ret	Andrew Leitch	Bugatti	+49 laps (DNF - crash)
Ret	Tim Rose-Richards	Maserati	+50 laps (DNF - universal joint)
