= 1934 Mannin Moar =

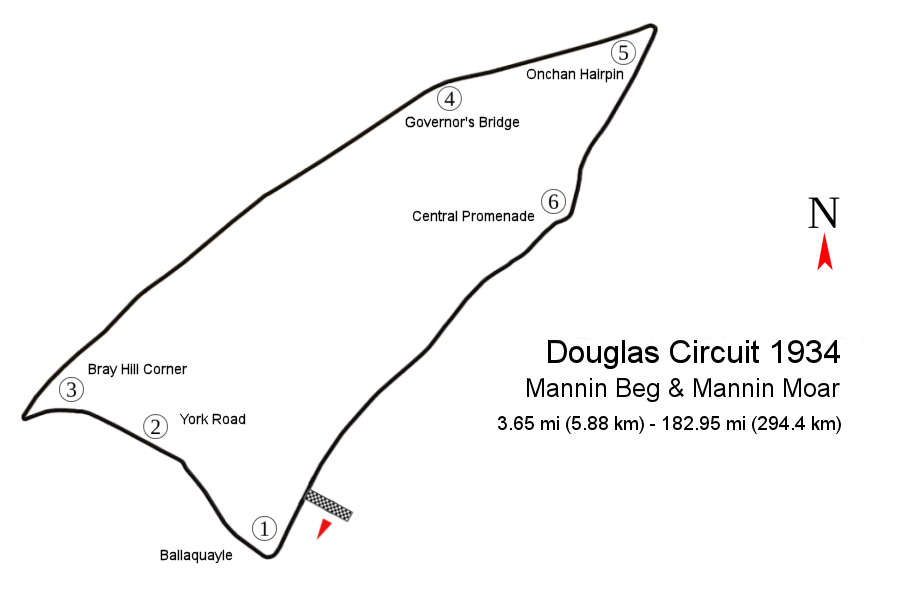

Race details
- Date: 2 June 1934
- Official name: II Mannin Moar
- Location: Douglas Circuit; Douglas, Isle of Man; United Kingdom
- Course: Street circuit
- Course length: 5.889 km (3.659 miles)
- Distance: 50 laps, 294.4 km (182.95 miles)

Pole position
Driver	(United Kingdom) Brian Lewis	N. Rees & A.W. Fox

Fastest lap
Driver	(United Kingdom) Brian Lewis	N. Rees & A.W. Fox
- Time: 2:50

Podium
First	(United Kingdom) Brian Lewis	N. Rees & A.W. Fox
Second	(United Kingdom) Charlie Dodson	John Cobb
Third	(United Kingdom) Cyril Paul	F.W. Dixon

The 1934 Mannin Moar (formally known as II Mannin Moar) was a Grand Prix that was held on 2 June 1934 at a street circuit in Douglas, Isle of Man, United Kingdom. It was the twelfth round of the 1934 Grand Prix season, but it did not count towards the championship. The race, contested over 50 laps of 3.659 mi, or 5.889 km, was won by Brian Lewis driving an Alfa Romeo Tipo B after starting from pole position.

== Entries ==
No.	Driver	Entrant	Car	DNS
1	(United Kingdom) Christopher Staniland	TASO Mathieson	Bugatti T51	
2	(United Kingdom) Tim Rose-Richards	T. Rose-Richards	Bugatti T51	
3	(United Kingdom) Lindsay Eccles	L. Eccles	Bugatti T51	
4	(United Kingdom) Brian Lewis	N. Rees & A.W. Fox	Alfa Romeo Tipo B	
5	(United Kingdom) Whitney Straight	W. Straight	Maserati 8CM	DNS
6	(United Kingdom) Buddy Featherstonhaugh	R. Featherstonhaugh	Maserati 8CM	DNS
7	(United Kingdom) Freddie Dixon	F.W. Dixon	Riley 2000/6	
8	(United Kingdom) Cyril Paul	F.W. Dixon	Riley 2000/6|	
9	(United Kingdom) Charlie Dodson	John Cobb	Alfa Romeo 8C 2300 Monza	
10	(United Kingdom) Hugh Hamilton	Kaye Don	Alfa Romeo 8C 2300 Monza	
11	(United Kingdom) Dick Shuttleworth	R. Shuttleworth	Bugatti T51	
12	(Portugal) Vasco Sameiro	E.F. Abecassis	Alfa Romeo 8C 2300 Monza	
14	(United Kingdom) Raymond Mays	H.W. Cook	ERA A-Type	DNS

- DNS = Did Not Start

== Starting positions ==
Pos.	Driver	Car Constructor
1	Brian Lewis	Alfa Romeo
2	Freddie Dixon	Riley
3	Christopher Staniland	Bugatti
4	Tim Rose-Richards	Bugatti
5	Vasco Sameiro	Alfa Romeo
6	Charlie Dodson	Alfa Romeo
7	Dick Shuttleworth	Bugatti
8	Lindsay Eccles	Bugatti
9	Hugh Hamilton	Alfa Romeo
10	Cyril Paul	Riley

== Race report ==
Rose-Richards made the best start of the line, overtaking both Staniland and Dixon to get into second place after Lewis, who would eventually stay in the lead the entire race. Staniland retired after just two laps due to gearbox problems and Rose-Richards retired with a broken water pump, leaving second and third place open for Dixon and Sameiro.

Between lap fifteen and lap forty, five drivers were forced to retire and the field was brought down to three cars. Although it was not an easy victory - his Alfa Romeo had lost a gear early in the race - Lewis took the flag after fifty laps ahead of Dodson and Paul.

== Race results ==
Pos.	Driver	Car Constructor	Time (Diff.)/Status
1	Brian Lewis	Alfa Romeo	2:25:41
2	Charlie Dodson	Alfa Romeo	+3:24
3	Cyril Paul	Riley	+11:32
4	Lindsay Eccles	Bugatti	+11 laps (DNF - rear axle)
5	Vasco Sameiro	Alfa Romeo	+12 laps (DNF - connecting rod)
6	Dick Shuttleworth	Bugatti	+21 laps (DNF - connecting rod)
7	Freddie Dixon	Riley	+30 laps (DNF - bearings)
8	Hugh Hamilton	Alfa Romeo	+34 laps (DNF - exhaust pipe)
9	Tim Rose-Richards	Bugatti	+36 laps (DNF - water pump)
10	Christopher Staniland	Bugatti	+48 laps (DNF - gearbox)

== Sources ==
- The R.A.C. Mannin
- www.kolumbus.fi, 1934 Mannin Moar
- www.kolumbus.fi, Drivers - The page of each aforementioned driver was consulted.
- www.isle-of-man.com, Douglas Street Circuit
- Racing Sports Cars, Drivers - The page of each aforementioned driver was consulted.
