= Douglas Circuit =

Motor racing street circuit in Douglas

(United Kingdom) Douglas Circuit
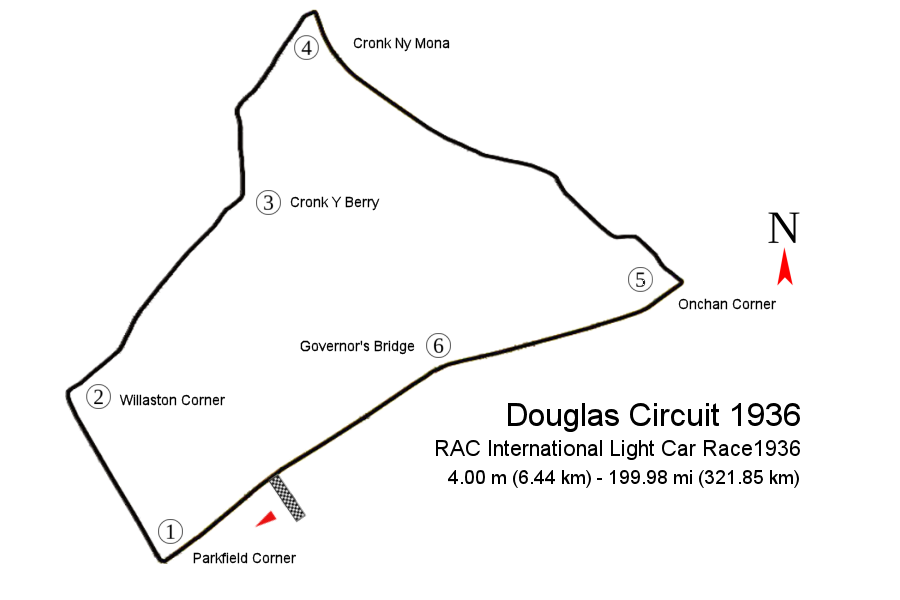
- Douglas Circuit (1936, 1947–1953)
- Location: Douglas, Isle of Man; United Kingdom
- Coordinates: 54°9′14.41″N 4°28′44.36″W
- Opened: 1933
- Closed: 1953
- Major events: British Empire Trophy (1947–1953); Mannin Moar (1933–1935)

Douglas Circuit (1936, 1947-1953)
- Surface: Asphalt
- Length: 6.455 km (4.011 mi)
- Turns: 5
- Race lap record: 3:05.9 ( (United Kingdom) Reg Parnell, Aston Martin DB3S, 1953, Sports car)

Douglas Circuit (1937)
- Surface: Asphalt
- Length: 6.278 km (3.901 mi)
- Turns: 4
- Race lap record: 3:10.0 ( (United Kingdom) Raymond Mays, ERA B, 1937, Voiturette)

Douglas Circuit (1935)
- Surface: Asphalt
- Length: 6.50 km (4.04 mi)
- Turns: 7
- Race lap record: 3:04.0 ( (United Kingdom) Pat Fairfield, ERA A-Type, 1935, Voiturette)

Douglas Circuit (1934)
- Surface: Asphalt
- Length: 5.95 km (3.70 mi)
- Turns: 6
- Race lap record: 2:50.0 ( (United Kingdom) Brian Lewis, Alfa Romeo Tipo B, 1934, GP)

Douglas Circuit (1933)
- Surface: Asphalt
- Length: 7.52 km (4.67 mi)
- Turns: 16
- Race lap record: 4:10.0 ( (United Kingdom) Brian Lewis, Alfa Romeo 8C 2300 Monza, 1933, GP)

The Douglas Circuit was a motor racing street circuit in Douglas, the capital and largest town of the Isle of Man and was re-configured each year until 1937. The first Grand Prix, titled "Mannin Beg & Mannin Moar" (English: Small Man & Big Man) was held in 1933 on a 4.67 mi (7.52 km) street circuit which repeated as II and III Mannin Moar on different circuit layouts until 1935. In 1936 the circuit changed again for the IV RAC International Light Car Race and a last time for the (1937) V RAC International Light Car Race.

Racing at Douglas resumed in post-war 1947, reverting to the 1936 4.011 mi (6.455 km) circuit configuration with the first Manx Cup and the 9th British Empire Trophy. This circuit variant remained largely unchanged until 1953, the 15th British Empire Trophy and last event held on the Douglas street circuit.

== Circuit history ==
1933–1935:
1936–1937:
1947-1951:
1947–1949:
1950:
1951–1953:

Mannin Beg & Mannin Moar
RAC International Light Car Race
I Manx Cup
British Empire Trophy
British Empire Trophy
British Empire Trophy

Grand Prix
Voiturette
Voiturette
Grand Prix
Formula One
Sports car

== Douglas circuit by year ==
Year	Race Name	Dist.	Circuit	Formula	Driver	Manufacturer	Time	Laps	Report
1933	I Mannin Moar	230.0 mi (370.1 km)	4.67 mi (7.52 km)	Grand Prix	(United Kingdom) Brian Lewis	Alfa Romeo 8C 2300 Monza	3:34:52.0	50	Report
1934	II Mannin Moar	182.95 mi (294.43 km)	3.70 mi (5.95 km)	Grand Prix	(United Kingdom) Brian Lewis	Alfa Romeo Tipo B	2:25:41.0	50	Report
1935	III Mannin Moar	201.75 mi (324.69 km)	4.04 mi (6.50 km)	Grand Prix	(United Kingdom) Brian Lewis	Bugatti T59	2:40:11.0	50	Report
1936	IV RAC International LCR *	199.98 mi (321.84 km)	4.011 mi (6.455 km)	Voiturette	(United Kingdom) Richard Seaman	Delage 15S8	2:52:01.0	50	Report
1937	V RAC International LCR	194.50 mi (313.02 km)	3.901 mi (6.278 km)	Voiturette	(Thailand) B Bira	ERA B	2:45:34.0	50	Report
1938-1946 (No racing events held)
1947	I Manx Cup	46.67 mi (75.11 km)	4.011 mi (6.455 km)	Voiturette	(Thailand) B Bira	Simca-Gordini T11	42:17.0	12	Report
1947	IX British Empire Trophy	155.59 mi (250.40 km)	4.011 mi (6.455 km)	Grand Prix	(United Kingdom) Bob Gerard	ERA B	2:16:52.0	40	Report
1948	II Manx Cup	69.84 mi (112.40 km)	4.011 mi (6.455 km)	Voiturette	(United Kingdom) George Nixon	Nixon Special	1:08:36.0	18	Report
1948	X British Empire Trophy	140.03 mi (225.36 km)	4.011 mi (6.455 km)	Grand Prix	(United Kingdom) Geoffrey Ansell	ERA B	2:03:45.0	36	Report
1949	III Manx Cup	69.84 mi (112.40 km)	4.011 mi (6.455 km)	Voiturette	(United Kingdom) John Heath	HW/Alta	1:04:08.0	18	Report
1949	XI British Empire Trophy	140.03 mi (225.36 km)	4.011 mi (6.455 km)	Grand Prix	(United Kingdom) Bob Gerard	ERA B	1:57:56.0	36	Report
1950	IV Manx Cup	69.84 mi (112.40 km)	4.011 mi (6.455 km)	Voiturette	(United Kingdom) Oscar Moore	OBM-BMW	1:02:51.0	18	Report
1950	XII British Empire Trophy	140.03 mi (225.36 km)	4.011 mi (6.455 km)	Formula One	(United Kingdom) Bob Gerard	ERA B	1:59:36.0	36	Report
1951	V Manx Cup	69.84 mi (112.40 km)	4.011 mi (6.455 km)	Voiturette	(United Kingdom) Gerry Dunham	Alvis 12/70 Speed 20	1:03:19.0	18	Report
1951	XIII British Empire Trophy	136.14 mi (219.10 km)	4.011 mi (6.455 km)	Sports car	(United Kingdom) Stirling Moss	Frazer Nash Bristol L6 OHV	1:57:38.0	35	Report
1952	XIV British Empire Trophy	202.26 mi (325.51 km)	4.011 mi (6.455 km)	Sports car	(United Kingdom) Pat Griffith	Lester T51 MG 6850	2:54:00	52	Report
1953	XV British Empire Trophy	62.23 mi (100.15 km)	4.011 mi (6.455 km)	Sports car	(United Kingdom) Reg Parnell	Aston Martin DB35	0:53:21.0	21	Report
Sources: (* RAC International Light Car Race)

== Layout history ==
Douglas Circuit layout history
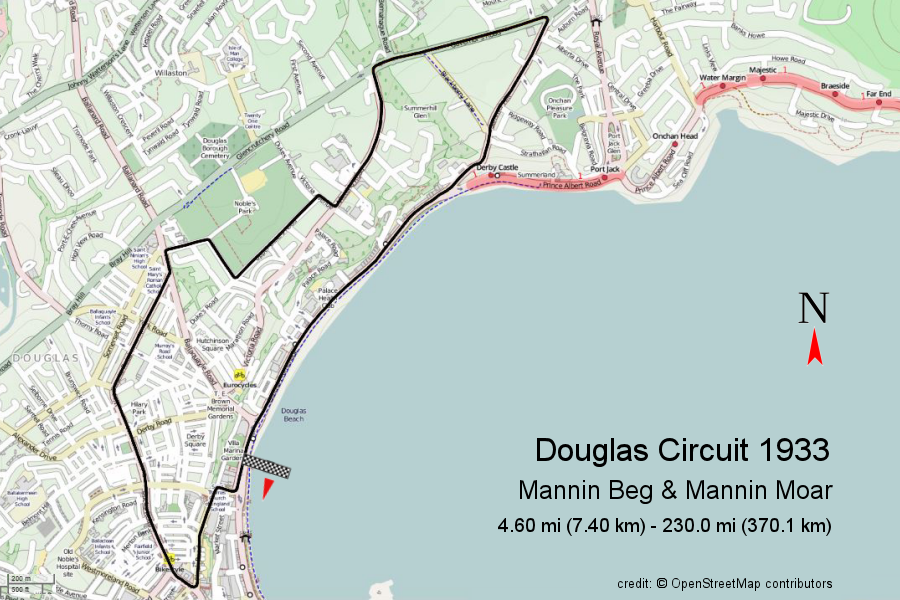
Street Map - Douglas Circuit (1933)

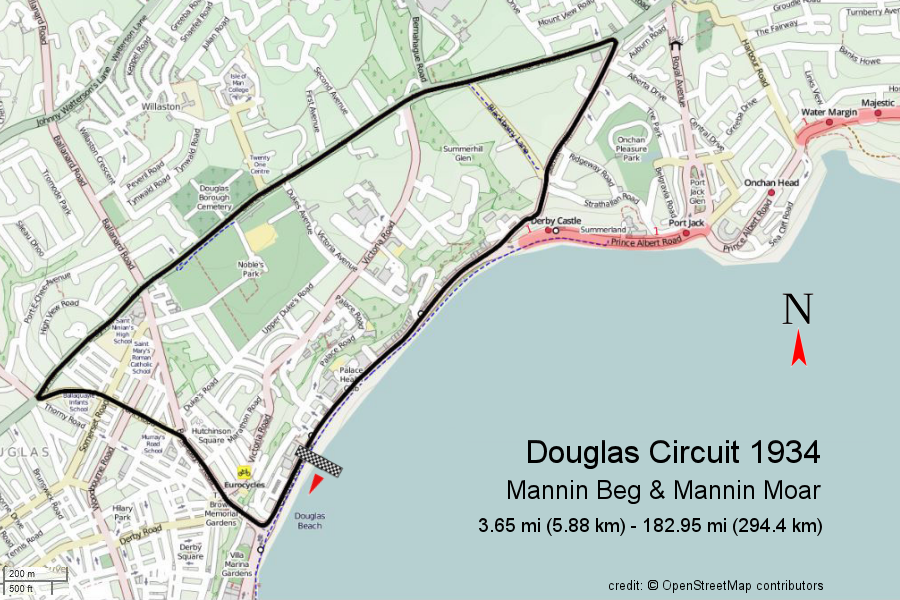
Street Map - Douglas Circuit (1934)

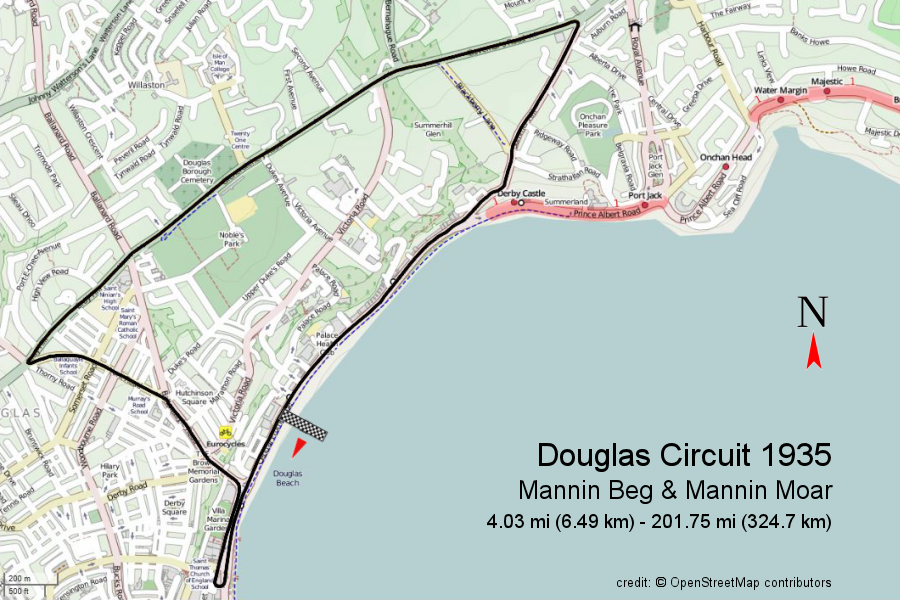
Street Map - Douglas Circuit (1935)

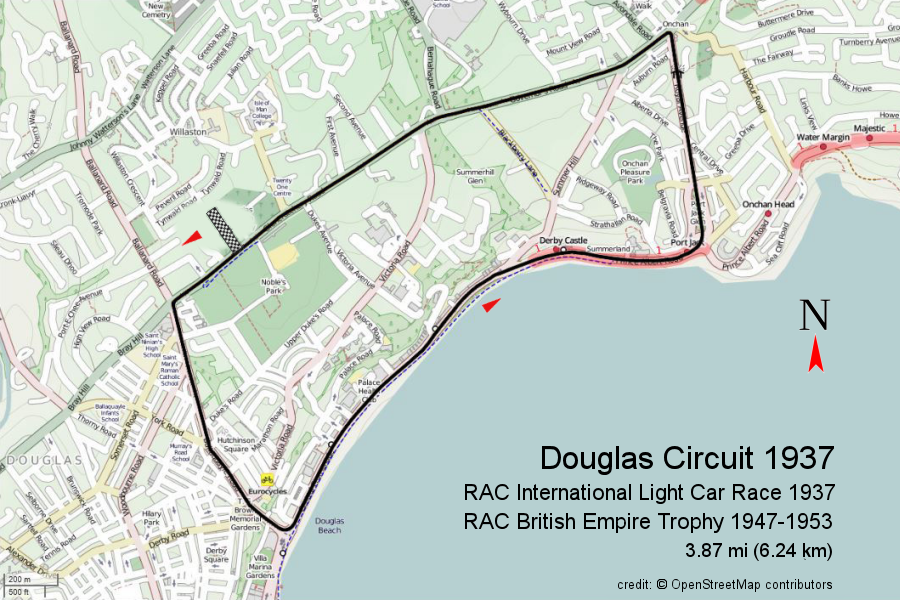
Street Map - Douglas Circuit (1937)

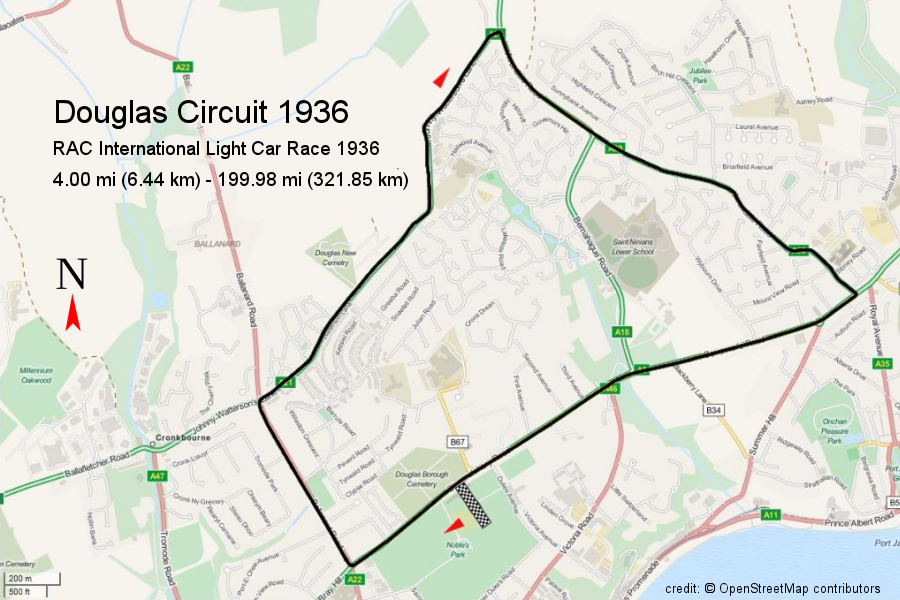
Street Map - Douglas Circuit (1936, 1947–1953)

== Lap records ==
The fastest official race lap records at the Douglas Circuit are listed as:

Category	Time	Driver	Vehicle	Event
Grand Prix Circuit (1936, 1947–1953): 4.011 mi (6.455 km)
Sports car racing	3:05.900	Reg Parnell	Aston Martin DB3S	1953 British Empire Trophy
Formula One	3:08.000	Reg Parnell	Maserati 4CLT/48	1950 British Empire Trophy
GP	3:09.000	Bob Gerard	ERA B-Type	1949 British Empire Trophy
Voiturette	3:20.000	Richard Seaman	Delage 15S8	1936 RAC International Light Car Race
Grand Prix Circuit (1937): 3.901 mi (6.278 km)
Voiturette	3:10.000	Raymond Mays	ERA C-Type	1937 RAC International Light Car Race
Grand Prix Circuit (1935): 4.04 mi (6.50 km)
Voiturette	3:04.000	Pat Fairfield	ERA A-Type	1935 Mannin Beg
GP	3:06.000	Brian Lewis	Bugatti Type 59	1935 Mannin Moar
Grand Prix Circuit (1934): 3.70 mi (5.95 km)
GP	2:50.000	Brian Lewis	Alfa Romeo Tipo B	1934 Mannin Moar
Voiturette	2:57.000	Freddie Dixon (Note: Both drivers took the same lap time independently.); George Eyston	Riley 1500/6; MG Magnette K3	1934 Mannin Beg
Grand Prix Circuit (1933): 4.67 mi (7.52 km)
GP	4:10.000	Brian Lewis	Alfa Romeo 8C 2300 Monza	1933 Mannin Moar
Voiturette	4:41.000	Hugh Hamilton	MG Magnette K3	1933 Mannin Beg
