= 1933 Mannin Moar =

1933 Mannin Moar Grand Prix
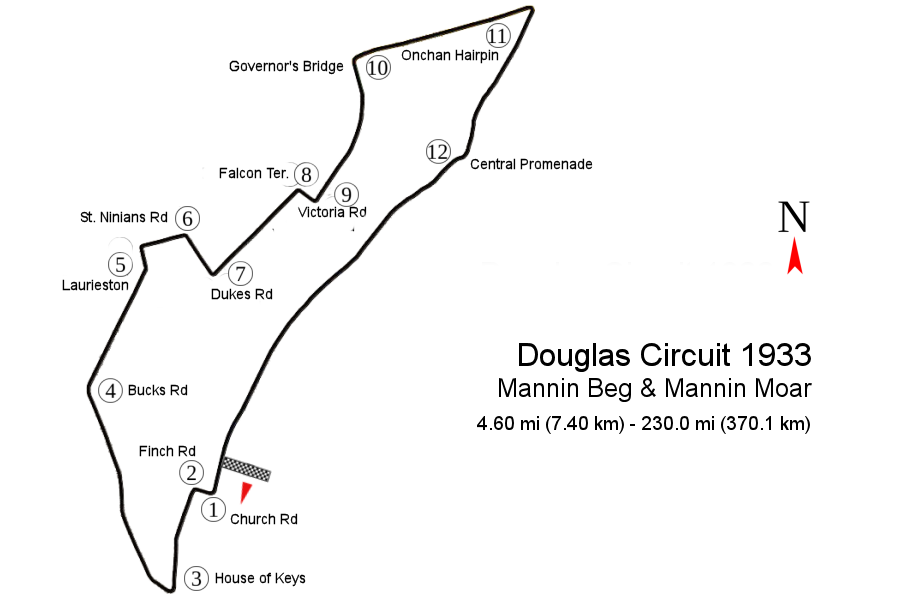

Race details
- Date: 14 July 1933
- Official name: I Mannin Moar
- Location: Douglas Circuit, Douglas, Isle of Man United Kingdom
- Course: Street circuit
- Course length: 7.4 km (4.6 miles)
- Distance: 50 laps, 370.1 km (230.0 miles)
- Weather: Dry

Pole position
Driver	(United Kingdom) Brian Lewis	N. Rees & A.W. Fox
- Time: Grid positions were drawn by ballot

Fastest lap
Driver	(United Kingdom) Brian Lewis	N. Rees & A.W. Fox
- Time: 4:10.0

Podium
First	(United Kingdom) Brian Lewis	N. Rees & A.W. Fox
Second	(United Kingdom) Tim Rose-Richards	T.E. Rose-Richards
Third	(United Kingdom) George Eyston	G. Eyston

The 1933 Mannin Moar (formally known as I Mannin Moar) was a Grand Prix that was held on 14 July 1933 at the Douglas street circuit in Douglas, Isle of Man, United Kingdom. It was the twenty-third round of the 1933 Grand Prix season, and did not count towards the championship. The race, contested over 50 laps of 4.6 mi, or 7.4 km, was won by Brian Lewis driving an Alfa Romeo 8C 2300 Monza after starting from pole position.

== Background ==
=== Rules and restrictions ===
When the R.A.C. wanted to organise a race on a street circuit, because of the popular Monaco Grand Prix, they found that it was illegal to close public roads for racing in the British mainland. However, the Isle of Man had its own laws, so a racing circuit was designed on the streets of Douglas. Two races were organised, Mannin Beg (English: Small Man) for non-supercharged voiturettes with engines smaller than 1500cc on 12 July 1933 and Mannin Moar (English: Great Man) for cars with engines over 1500cc and supercharged voiturettes on 14 July 1933.

Riding mechanics were mandatory for all cars. This was possibly the last time this rule was used in Grand Prix motor racing. The purpose of this rule was that the mechanics could signal to the flag marshals that their drivers wanted to pass a car in front, so that the marshals could flag that car to get out of the way. On behalf of the drivers, Earl Howe wrote a letter to The Motor complaining that the rules were considered an embarrassment and would turn races from international events into second rate affairs. The R.A.C. however stuck to their ideas. As said, after this race the rule that mandated mechanics was never again applied.

=== Track ===
The course of the 1933 race was 5.8 km (3.6 mi) long. The start line was near the Villa Marina on the Douglas Promenade. The first series of corners included Greensills Corner, a sharp right hander that led onto Church Road, followed by an equally sharp left hander that led into Finch Road. Then the course turned right around the House of Keys onto a fast section over Prospect Hill, Bucks Road and Laurieston Road. Next, six sharp bends followed a zigzag pattern over Ballaquale Road, St. Ninians Road, Dukes Road and Falcon Ter before ending up on Victoria Road that led to Governor's Bridge in a fast left hander. A right hand turn onto Governor's Oad and Onchan was the most Northern corner of the circuit. From there the course followed a fast steep downwards section on Summer Hill Road between a wall on one side and houses on the other before coming back onto the promenade and ending up via Castle Mona Road at Villa Marina.

The Douglas street circuit had a faster average speed than Circuit de Monaco, namely 105 km/h (65 mph), compared to Monaco's 96 km/h (60 mph).

== Entries ==
No.	Driver	Entrant	Car	DNA
1	(United Kingdom) Bob Lace	A.C. Lace	Invicta	
2	(United Kingdom) Whitney Straight	W. Straight	Maserati 26M	DNA
3	(United Kingdom) Charles Brackenbury (United Kingdom) Dick Shuttleworth	R.O. Shuttleworth	Bugatti T51	
4	(United Kingdom) Raymond Mays	R. Mays	Riley 1500/6	DNA
5	Tim Fotheringham	T. Fotheringham	Bugatti T35B	
6	(United Kingdom) Brian Lewis	N. Rees & A.W. Fox	Alfa Romeo 8C 2300 Monza	
7	Charles Needham	C. Needham	Frazer Nash	DNA
8	(United Kingdom) Edmund Harker	W.E. Harker	Austin 7 Harker Special	DNA
9	(United Kingdom) Tim Rose-Richards	T.E. Rose-Richards	Bugatti T51	
10	(United Kingdom) T.A.S.O. Mathieson	T. Mathieson	Bugatti T35C	
11	(United Kingdom) George Eyston	G. Eyston	Alfa Romeo 8C 2300 Monza	
12	(United Kingdom) Lindsay Eccles	A.H.L. Eccles	Bugatti T51	
14	(United Kingdom) Kaye Don	K. Don	Alfa Romeo 8C 2300 Monza	
15	(United Kingdom) Walter Handley	W. Handley	Alfa Romeo 8C 2300 Monza	DNA
16	(United Kingdom) Bernard Rubin	B. Rubin	Alfa Romeo 8C 2300 Monza	DNA

- DNA = Did Not Arrive

== Qualifying ==
The grid positions were decided by ballot.

Pos.	Driver	Car Constructor
1	Brian Lewis	Alfa Romeo
2	Charles Brackenbury	Bugatti
3	Tim Rose-Richards	Bugatti
4	George Eyston	Alfa Romeo
5	Tim Fotheringham	Bugatti
6	T.A.S.O. Mathieson	Bugatti
7	Lindsay Eccles	Bugatti
8	Bob Lace	Invicta
9	Kaye Don	Alfa Romeo

== Race report ==
At the start of the race Lewis lost two places to Brackenbury and Eyston, who at his turn had overtaken Rose-Richards. Mathieson had the worst start - he had fallen back to the last position before the first corner. After the first lap the order was Eyston, Brackenbury, Lewis, Rose-Richard. On lap two Lewis' mechanic signaled their intention to overtake Eyston for the lead to the flag marshals, but they did not succeed. Eccles first pitted with gearbox troubles in lap three, then stalled his engine and later crashed into a wall.

After five laps Eyston was in the lead followed by Lewis and Rose-Richards. Mathieson pitted for adjustments on his car. Lewis' mechanic was again waving to the marshalls and they waved flags to Eyston, but it took another two laps for Lewis to get into the lead. Rose-Richards took advantage of the situation and moved up to second. Meanwhile, Fotheringham's Bugatti was leaking fluid, so he went into the pits to fill up oil and water.

After ten laps, Lace and Mathieson had been lapped due to the time they lost in the pit and Fotheringham's engine had given up in a big cloud of smoke. Lewis and Rose-Richards kept fighting for the lead. Sixty-five minutes into the race, they had covered fifteen laps and there was just seven seconds between them. This remained unchanged for a long time, even though both drivers made a pitstop around lap 25. At that time, Shuttleworth took over from Brackenbury, but braked too late into the first corner and went up at the escape road. He did manage to return to the race. On lap thirty-five, Shuttleworth drove into the pits far too fast, lost control and crashed backwards into the wooden pit structure. Two men were slightly injured - a Dunlop employee and Mannin Beg winner Freddy Dixon. However, the Bugatti was wrecked as was a considerable part of the pits.

Not long after that, Lace had his brakes repaired on his Invicta and putted them to the test. When he came down Summer Hill, he crashed into a telephone pole. He escaped without injuries, the car and the pole were wrecked.

Around lap forty, Rose-Richards had lost third gear and he fell back in the final ten laps of the race. Lewis eventually won two minutes ahead of Rose-Richards and three ahead of Eyston. Don and Mathieson were the only remaining contestants and were given fifteen minutes to complete the remaining laps. On Mathieson forty-second lap, he lost his brake and went up the escape road, which ended with a barrier that protected a big crowd of spectators. Mathieson deliberately crashed his Bugatti into a shop, but the car spun and the rear end still hit four spectators. They were sent to hospital with minor injuries. Don did finish the race and became fourth.

== Race results ==
Pos.	Driver	Car Constructor	Time (Diff.)/Status
1	Brian Lewis	Alfa Romeo	3:34:52
2	Tim Rose-Richards	Bugatti	+2:05
3	George Eyston	Alfa Romeo	+4:05
4	Kaye Don	Alfa Romeo	+1 lap
5	T.A.S.O. Mathieson	Bugatti	+ 7 laps (crash)
6	Bob Lace	Invicta	+13 laps (crash)
7	Charles Brackenbury/Dick Shuttleworth	Bugatti	+15 laps (crash)
8	Tim Fotheringham	Bugatti	+40 laps (engine)
9	Lindsay Eccles	Bugatti	+ 46 laps (crash)

== Sources ==
- www.kolumbus.fi, 1933 Mannin Moar
- Lombard Register, 1933 Mannin Moar
- www.isle-of-man.com, Douglas Street Circuit
- www.kolumbus.fi - The page of each aforementioned driver was consulted.
- Racing Sports Cars - The page of each aforementioned driver was consulted.
