= Mannin Moar =

(United Kingdom) Mannin Beg & Mannin Moar
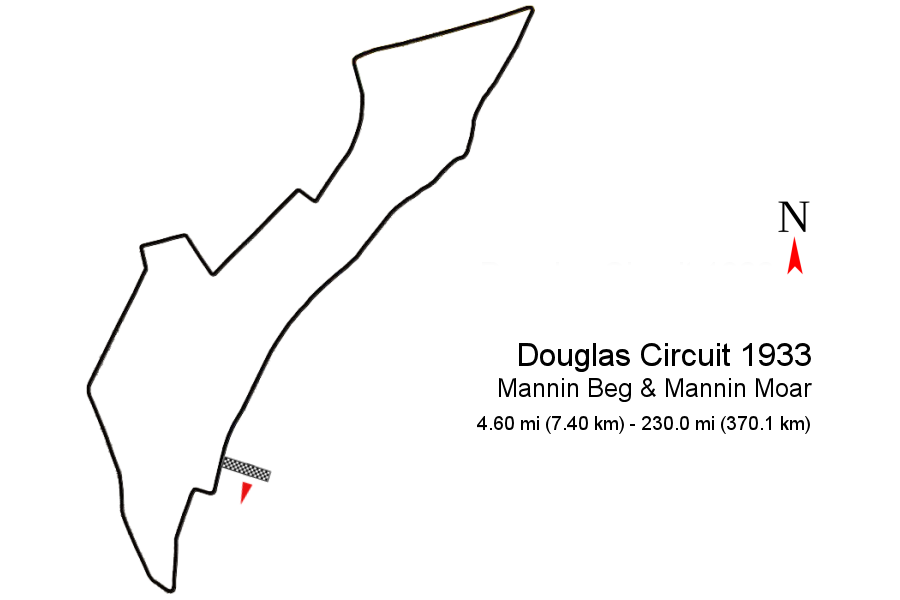
- Location: Douglas Circuit; Douglas, Isle of Man; United Kingdom
- Coordinates: 54°9′14.41″N 4°28′44.36″W
- Major events: Grand Prix

Douglas Circuit (1933 layout)
- Surface: Asphalt
- Length: 7.40 km (4.60 mi)
- Turns: 16
- Race lap record: 4:10.0 ( (United Kingdom) Brian Lewis, Alfa Romeo 8C 2300 Monza, 1933, Grand Prix)

Douglas Circuit (1934 layout)
- Surface: Asphalt
- Length: 5.88 km (3.65 mi)
- Turns: 8
- Race lap record: 2:50 ( (United Kingdom) Brian Lewis, Alfa Romeo Tipo B, 1934, Grand Prix)

Douglas Circuit (1935 layout)
- Surface: Asphalt
- Length: 6.50 km (4.04 mi)
- Turns: 9
- Race lap record: 3:06 ( (United Kingdom) Brian Lewis, Bugatti Type 59, 1935, Grand Prix)

The Mannin Moar was a non-championship Grand Prix held in Douglas, Isle of Man, Great Britain in 1933, 1934 and 1935. The most successful driver was Brian Lewis, having won all three races.

== Background ==
=== Rules and restrictions ===
When the R.A.C. wanted to organise a race on a street circuit, because of the popular Monaco Grand Prix, they found that it was illegal to close public roads for racing in the British mainland. However, the Isle of Man had its own laws, so a racing circuit was designed on the streets of Douglas. Two races were organised, Mannin Beg (English: Small Man) for non-supercharged voiturettes with engines smaller than 1500cc on 12 July 1933 and Mannin Moar (English: Great Man) for cars with engines over 1500cc and supercharged voiturettes on 14 July 1933.

Riding mechanics were mandatory for all cars. This was possibly the last time this rule was used in Grand Prix motor racing. The purpose of this rule was that the mechanics could signal to the flag marshals that their drivers wanted to pass a car in front, so that the marshals could flag that car to get out of the way. On behalf of the drivers, Earl Howe wrote a letter to The Motor complaining that the rules were considered an embarrassment and would turn races from international events into second rate affairs. The R.A.C. however stuck to their ideas. As said, after this race the rule that mandated mechanics was never again applied.

=== Track ===
The Douglas street circuit of the 1933 race was 7.4 km (4.6 mi) long. The 1934 course had been shortened to 5.889 km (3.659 mi) and the 1935 course was altered to a length of 6.494 km (4.035 mi). The start line of the original track was near the Villa Marina on the Douglas Promenade. The first series of corners included Greensills Corner, a sharp right hander that led onto Church Road, followed by an equally sharp left hander that led into Finch Road. Then the course turned right around the House of Keys onto a fast section over Prospect Hill, Bucks Road and Laurieston Road. Next, six sharp bends followed a zigzag pattern over Ballaquale Road, St. Ninians Road, Dukes Road and Falcon Ter before ending up on Victoria Road that led to Governor's Bridge in a fast left hander. A right hand turn onto Governor's Road and Onchan was the most Northern corner of the circuit. From there the course followed a fast steep downwards section on Summer Hill Road between a wall on one side and houses on the other before coming back onto the promenade and ending up via Castle Mona Road at Villa Marina.

The Douglas circuit had a faster average speed than Circuit de Monaco, namely 105 km/h (65 mph), compared to Monaco's 96 km/h (60 mph).

== Results ==
Year	Date	Winner			Second place			Third place			Report
Year	Date	No.	Driver	Car	No.	Driver	Car	No.	Driver	Car	Report
1933	July 14	6	(United Kingdom) Brian Lewis	Alfa Romeo 8C 2300 Monza	9	(United Kingdom) Tim Rose-Richards	Bugatti T51	11	(United Kingdom) George Eyston	Alfa Romeo 8C 2300 Monza	Report
1934	June 1	4	(United Kingdom) Brian Lewis	Alfa Romeo Tipo B	9	(United Kingdom) Charles Dodson	Alfa Romeo 8C 2300 Monza	8	(United Kingdom) Cyril Paul	Riley 2000/6	Report
1935	May 31	7	(United Kingdom) Brian Lewis	Alfa Romeo 8C 2300 Monza	10	(United Kingdom) Charles Martin	Bugatti T59	5	(United Kingdom) Luis Fontés	Bugatti T 51	Report

== Douglas Circuits 1933-1935 ==
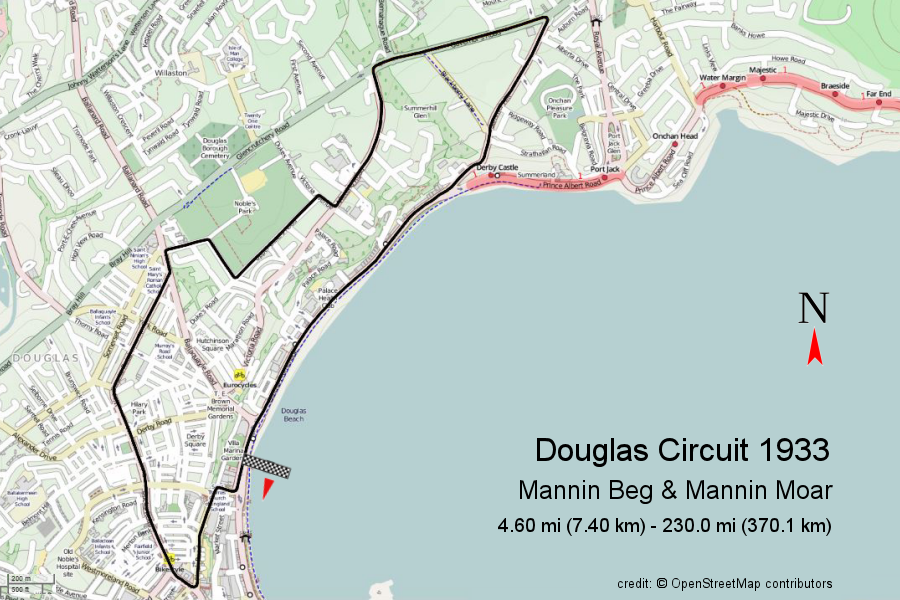
Street Map - Douglas Circuit 1933

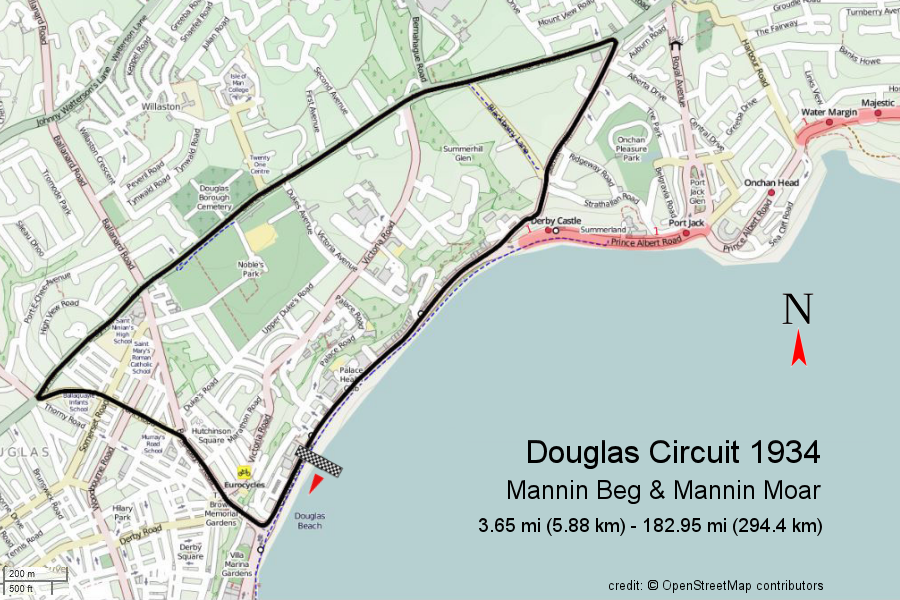
Street Map - Douglas Circuit 1934

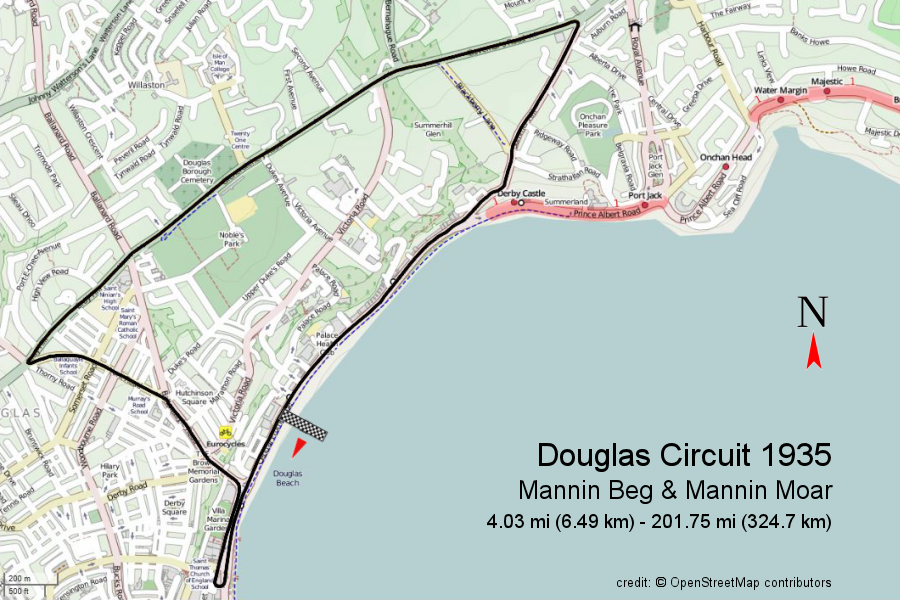
Street Map - Douglas Circuit 1935
