= Charles Brackenbury =

Racing driver (1907–59)

- Born: Charles Edgar Mills Brackenbury; 1 February 1907 South Elkington, Lincolnshire
- Died: 2 November 1959 (aged 52) Woking, Surrey

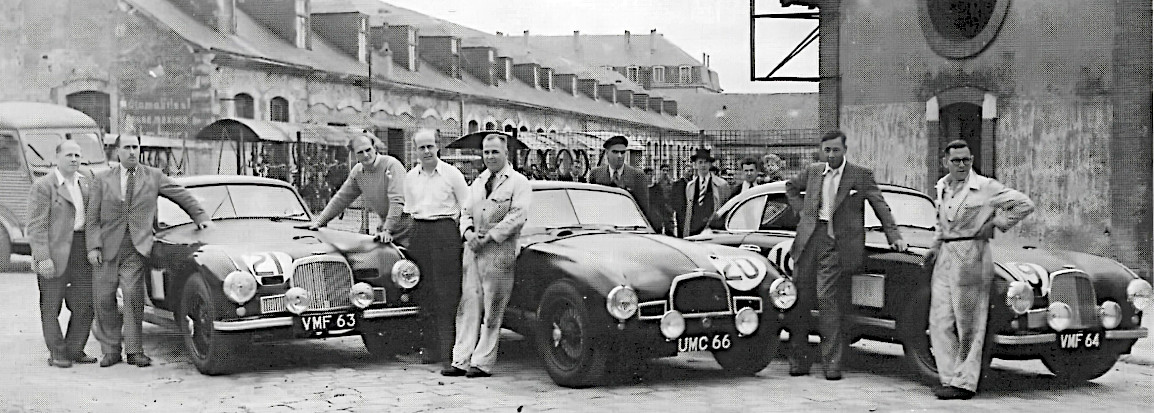
Aston Martins and crew at Le Mans in 1950; Brackenbury, who drove no. 21, is in the middle, wearing a tie

Charles Brackenbury (1 February 1907 – 2 November 1959) was a British racing driver, best known for his drives at the 24 Hours of Le Mans.

== Family ==
Brackenbury was from a wealthy Lincolnshire dynasty, and the son of Thomas Hutton Brackenbury, although his family did not approve of his racing activities. His desire to get involved in motor sport was such that he bought a garage by the Brooklands circuit, which had previously been owned by Eric Fernihough, and would later be owned by Tony Brooks).

== Racing career ==
After trying motorcycle racing, Brackenbury made his motor racing debut in 1929 at Brooklands, in a B.N.C. cyclecar; in 1930 he bought a Bugatti Type 37, which he originally painted black (later changing to red), and took his first success in the Essex Short Handicap that Easter. His first race of note was at the International 500 Miles Race in October 1930 although he was not classified as a finisher.

His main success in the Bugatti was winning the Gold Star race in 1932, beating Oliver Bertram in the 10.5-litre V12 Delage by ten seconds; like with most Brooklands races, this race was a handicap, and Bertram had given Brackenbury a start of over a minute.

In 1933, "Brack" started racing for MG, taking part in the JCC 200 Mile race that year. He also made his Le Mans debut in 1934, sharing Lord de Clifford's 1.1-litre Lagonda Rapier to 16th. Brack had by now generated a reputation as being a talented and safe amateur, and was used as an ad hoc reserve driver on many occasions.

He repeated his Brooklands Gold Star Handicap triumph in 1935, this time with a supercharged 2.3-litre straight-eight Bugatti, and was taken on as an Aston Martin works driver for the 1935 24 Hours of Le Mans race. He finished 3rd with Charlie Martin, winning the Index of Performance and 1.5 litre class, and the duo's Aston Martin Ulster took the Coupe Biennale. This race started a long association with Martin; "Brack" looked after the management side of Martin's entries, and acted as his reserve driver, which he undertook in parallel with racing for Freddie Dixon's team of Rileys. The two even approached Auto Union in 1935 with a view to buying a Grand Prix car.

His success in endurance racing also caught the attention of John Cobb, who recruited him to the Napier-Railton team (along with Johnny Hindmarsh and Tim Rose-Richards) which successfully took the 24 hour world speed record at Bonneville in Utah in September 1936, setting an average of 150.16 mph.

Before the Second World War, Brackenbury recorded a pair of third places in major races; in the 1937 500 Mile race, with Anthony Powys-Lybbe in a Sunbeam, and at the 1939 event, with Arthur Dobson in W. O. Bentley's brand-new Lagonda V12, the pair taking Bentley's advice to adopt a steady and consistent pace, and rewarded by the new car's reliability. Brackenbury used the same car to win the First Outer Circuit Handicap at Brooklands on 3 August 1939 - the last-ever meeting at the Weybridge circuit.

Although mostly a sportscar racer, Brackenbury did take part in some major single-seater events in 1937. He was 5th in Martin's Alfa Romeo Tipo B in the 1937 Campbell Trophy, and also used the Alfa in the British Empire Trophy; in the J.C.C. 200 Mile race, by now being held at Donington Park, he was asked to drive Austin Dobson's ERA R7B and brought it home seventh. Brackenbury had a second E.R.A. drive two years later, as reserve driver to Bob Ansell in R9B, the two finishing 9th in the J.C.C. International Trophy. He also had a one-off rally appearance in the 1938 Monte Carlo Rally, finishing 29th in a Lagonda with Alan Good.

After the war, Brack collected another third place in an endurance race, this time at the 1949 24 Hours of Spa, sharing an Aston Martin DB2 with Leslie Johnson; the duo nearly won, as the two cars ahead (the Ferrari of Luigi Chinetti/Jean Lucas and the Delage of Henri Louveau/Edmond Mouche) had to crawl for the last couple of laps, both crippled, in order to avoid disqualification. His last appearance at Le Mans came in the 1950 event, finishing sixth with Reg Parnell again in a DB2. He signed off his racing career in the 12 Heures de Hyères in June 1954, sharing an Aston Martin DB3 with Nigel Mann to sixth place.

== Personal life ==
Brackenbury married Muriel McConnell in Sevenoaks 1929, and the couple had two sons.

Brackenbury was noted as a practical joker, one of his most famous pranks being to put fireworks on the plugs of Alfred Neubauer's Mercedes at the 1938 Donington Grand Prix, creating a riot of smoke and sparks when Neubauer started the engine.

In October 1959 he fell seriously ill, being taken in by a nursing home in Woking, where he died on 2 November 1959.

== Le Mans results ==
Year	Team	Co-Drivers	Car	Class	Laps	Pos.	Class Pos.
1934	(United Kingdom) Lord de Clifford	(United Kingdom) Lord de Clifford	Lagonda Rapier	1.1	153	16th	8th
1935	(United Kingdom) Aston Martin	(United Kingdom) Charlie Martin	Alfa Romeo 8C 2300 LM	1.5	215	3rd	1st
1937	(United Kingdom) Arthur W. Fox	(United Kingdom) Johnny Hindmarsh	Lagonda LG45	5.0	30	ret	ret
1939	(United Kingdom) Lagonda Cars Ltd	(United Kingdom) Arthur Dobson	Lagonda V12	5.0	239	3rd	2nd
1949	(United Kingdom) Aston Martin	(United Kingdom) Leslie Johnson	Aston Martin DB2	3.0	6	ret	ret
1950	(United Kingdom) Aston Martin	(United Kingdom) Reg Parnell	Aston Martin DB2	3.0	244	6th	2nd
