= Tim Rose-Richards =

British racing driver (1902-40)

- Born: Thomas Essery Rose-Richards; 6 June 1902 Mayals, Glamorgan
- Died: 7 October 1940 (aged 38) near Anvil Point, England

Thomas Essery "Tim" Rose-Richards (6 June 1902 – 7 October 1940) was a British racing driver and Second World War pilot.

== Early life ==
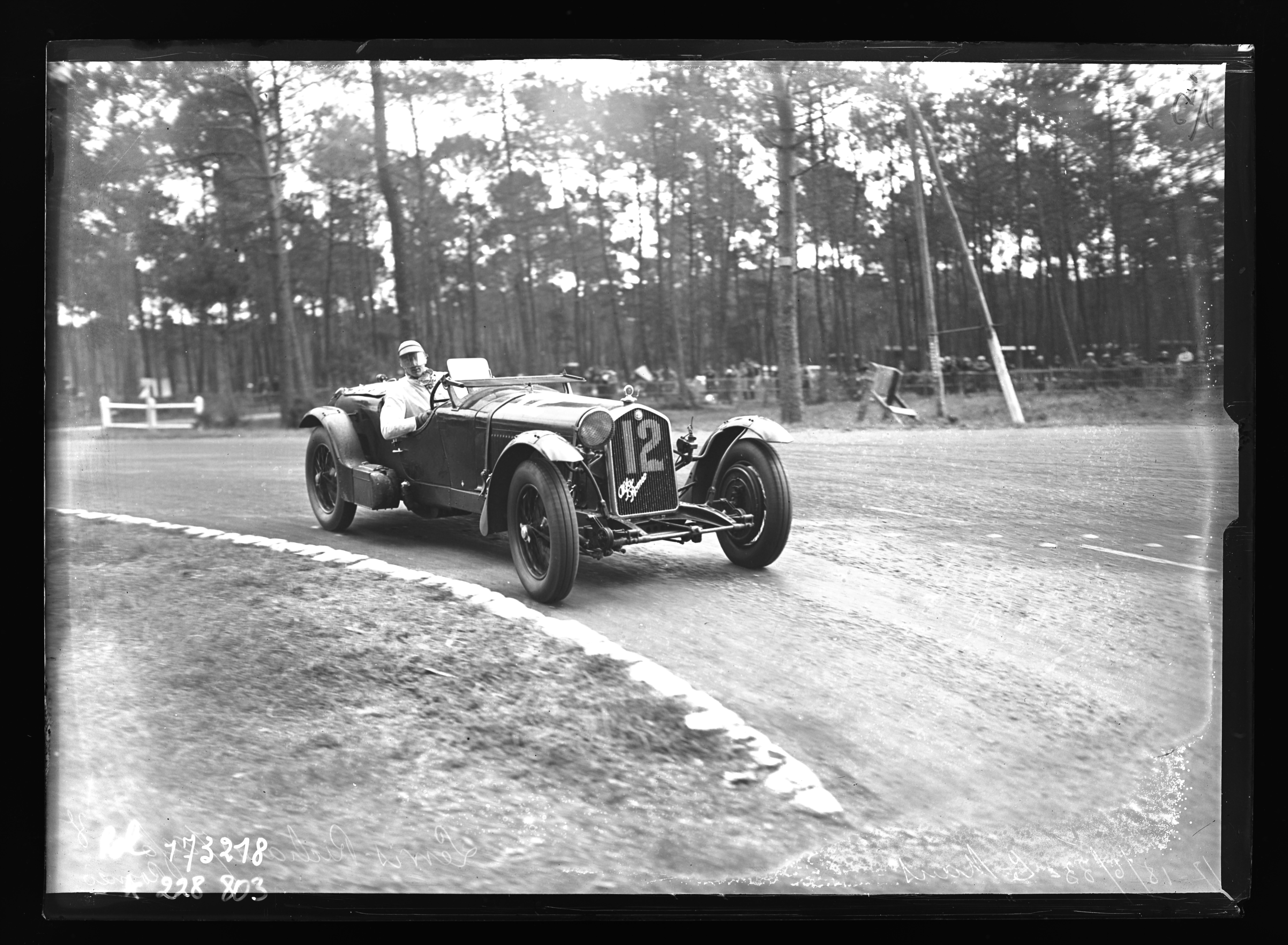
Richards during the 1933 24 Hours of Le Mans

Rose-Richards was the son of T. P. Rose-Richards, owner of a shipping line and chairman of the Prince of Wales Dry Dock. During the First World War, he served in the British Army, attaining the rank of Major, and became a stockbroker after the war.

== Racing career ==
Rose-Richards raced on a purely amateur basis. He started racing in 1929, and raced in the 24 Hours of Le Mans from 1929 to 1934. He finished in third place for three years consecutively (1931 to 1933). He also finished third in the 1933 Tourist Trophy (in a straight-8 Alfa Romeo) behind Tazio Nuvolari and Hugh Hamilton and second in the 1933 Mannin Moar (with his Bugatti Type 51) behind his regular Le Mans team-mate Brian Lewis.

In 1935 he had occasional works drives with English Racing Automobiles; the highlight was a third place finish in the voiturette class of the 1935 Eifelrennen driving chassis R1A. His greatest success however was winning the 1935 International 500 Miles Race at Brooklands, sharing the enormous Napier-Railton with fellow stockbroker John Cobb, finishing first on both outright speed and on handicap. The success earned him a prestigious B.R.D.C. Gold Star. With Cobb, Rose-Richards set a number of speed records in the Napier-Railton in 1935 and 1936, culminating in a 24 hour world record at Bonneville Salt Flats with the help of other drivers. The triumph in the 500 Mile race however appears to have been his last racing appearance.

== War service and death ==
As he had a pilot's licence, Rose-Richards joined the Royal Naval Volunteer Reserve at the start of the war, and was swiftly commissioned into the Fleet Air Arm; he was a member of 765 Naval Air Squadron based at Sandbanks. On 7 October 1940, while piloting a Supermarine Walrus seaplane in an attempt to rescue a downed Luftwaffe pilot from the English Channel off Anvil Point, two Heinkel 111s raked the seaplane with machine gun fire, and he (and co-pilot Lt Michael Hoskins) were killed. He was survived by his wife, Bettina (née Paterson) from Cape Town, and daughter Helena.

== Le Mans results ==
| Year | Team | Co-Drivers | Car | Class | Laps | Pos. | Class Pos. |
|---|---|---|---|---|---|---|---|
| 1929 | (United Kingdom) Fox & Nichol | (United Kingdom) Brian Lewis | Lagonda OH | 2.0 | 29 | DNF | DNF |
| 1930 | (United Kingdom) Fox & Nichol | (United Kingdom) Johnny Hindmarsh | Talbot AO90 | 3.0 | 161 | 4th | 2nd |
| 1931 | (United Kingdom) Fox & Nichol | (United Kingdom) Arthur Saunders Davies | Talbot AV105 | 3.0 | 174 | 3rd | 2nd |
| 1932 | (United Kingdom) A. W. Fox | (United Kingdom) Brian Lewis | Talbot AV105 | 3.0 | 180 | 3rd | 3rd |
| 1933 | (United Kingdom) A. W. Fox | (United Kingdom) Brian Lewis | Alfa Romeo 8C 2300 | 3.0 | 225 | 3rd | 3rd |
| 1934 | (United Kingdom) Earl Howe | (United Kingdom) Earl Howe | Alfa Romeo 8C 2300 LM | 3.0 | 85 | DNF | DNF |
