= Arthur Dobson (racing driver) =

British racing driver (1914–80)

- Born: Arthur Charles Dobson; 8 June 1914 Lodsworth, England
- Died: 12 March 1980 (aged 65) Battersea, London

Arthur Dobson was a British racing driver active during the 1930s.

== Career ==
Arthur, and older brother Austin Dobson, were part of a wealthy family, and both started racing in the 1930s, Arthur in 1934 in a 2.3 litre Bugatti; he was noted for his "dashing character and driving style". After testing the water with various cars, including an Alfa Romeo Monza, Dobson bought a brand new E.R.A. B-type (R7B), which he had painted white with a nickel-plated radiator cowl, and used it to finish 6th in the 1936 Donington Grand Prix; he was the last runner to complete the full distance, despite losing time after his fuel filler cap came loose, leading to an oil spillage around the circuit. One of the drivers who went off as a result was brother Austin, who found a route back on track through the Donington trees.

Dobson also picked up up 2nd places in the Nuffield Trophy at Donington and at the Limerick Grand Prix. As a result he graduated to a works C-type (R12C) from the 1937 Prix de Berne, which he duly won, along with the 1937 JCC 200 Mile race; he overtook team leader Raymond Mays in the latter for the victory. After such lèse-majestê he reverted to R7B for other races, including the 1937 and 1938 Donington Grands Prix. In the former he lost 11 minutes in changing a magneto, taking a new one from Charlie Martin's retired car, and was classified 8th, finishing 74 of the 80 laps. In the latter he finished 6th, first of the non-Silver Arrows runners, having raced close to Luigi Villoresi and René Dreyfus until their retirements.

His last major triumph was winning the Brooklands Road Championship in 1939, in an E.R.A. D-type, the field including Tony Rolt and Reg Parnell. For the remainder of the season he was entrusted with the recalcitrant E-type, which led to a mixture of non-starts and retirements; a good run at the Albi Grand Prix was spoilt when an exhaust problem prompted the E.R.A. pits to call Dobson in, but gave the signal so close to the pit entry that Dobson crashed trying to comply.

Dobson joined the Royal Air Force for the Second World War, although his service was terminated in 1941. Despite being only just in his thirties when the war ended, Dobson never returned to racing, due to what was put down variously as poor health, or running out of money.

=== Sports cars ===
Dobson drove for the works Riley team in 1937, winning the Coupe de la Commission Sportive at Montlhéry in a TT Sprite, but the company - financially stretched - did not enter the 24 Hours of Le Mans. Dobson therefore made his debut in the event the following year, by accident; he had gone to watch as a spectator, but Dorothy Stanley-Turner, who had planned to race her MG Midget PB with Elsie Wisdom, fell ill, and Dobson stepped in. It was to no avail, as the radiator boiled at the end of Dobson's first stint. Redemption came in the 1939 event, when Dobson finished third with Charles Brackenbury in W. O. Bentley's brand-new Lagonda V12 after a steady and reliable run.

== Death ==
Dobson died on 12 March 1980, two days after attending a dinner held by the E.R.A. Club at the Kensington Close Hotel in London.

== Le Mans results ==
Year	Team	Co-Drivers	Car	Class	Laps	Pos.	Class Pos.
1938	(United Kingdom) Dorothy Stanley-Turner	(United Kingdom) Elsie Wisdom	MG Midget PB	1.1	48	ret	ret
1939	(United Kingdom) Lagonda Cars Ltd	(United Kingdom) Charles Brackenbury	Lagonda V12	5.0	239	3rd	2nd
