= Brian Lewis, 2nd Baron Essendon =

British racing driver (1903–1978)

Brian Lewis
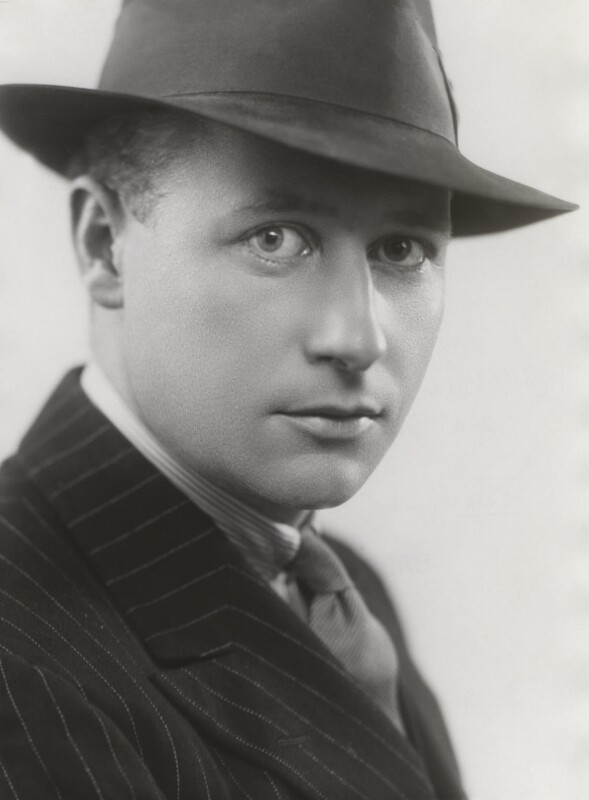
- Lewis in 1932
- Born: Brian Edmund Lewis; 7 December 1903 Edmonton, Middlesex, England
- Died: 13 July 1978 (aged 74) Lausanne, Vaud, Switzerland

Champ Car career
- 1 race run over 1 year
- First race: 1936 Vanderbilt Cup (Westbury)
Wins	Podiums	Poles
0	0	0

24 Hours of Le Mans career
- Years: 1929–1935
- Teams: Fox & Nichol, Fox, Earl Howe
- Best finish: 3rd (1930, 1932, 1933)
- Class wins: 1 (1930)

Brian Edmund "Bug" Lewis, 2nd Baron Essendon (7 December 1903 – 13 July 1978), was a British racing driver, company director, baronet and peer.

== Biography ==
Born in Edmonton, Middlesex, Lewis was the only son of the first Lord Essendon, the shipping magnate, by his wife Eleanor (died 1967), daughter of R. H. Harrison of West Hartlepool. In 1938, Lewis married Mary Duffil, widow of Albert Duffil, daughter of G. W. Booker of Los Angeles.

Educated at Malvern, and Pembroke College, Cambridge, Lewis was a Director of Furness Withy (the family shipping firm), Barry Aikman Travel Ltd and Godfrey Davis & Co Ltd.

Lewis raced Frazer Nashes in England in the 1920s and entered a private Maserati 8CM at the Swiss Grand Prix 1935. As The Times put it in 1978:

'Along with a distinguished band that included Lord Howe, Sir Henry Birkin, and the Earl of March, later the Duke of Richmond, he was one of a bunch of titled and talented amateurs who did much for the image of British motor racing in the 1920s and 1930s, albeit mainly at the wheel of foreign cars.'

In 1930, along with noted pilot Charles Barnard, Lewis founded Brian Lewis and C.D. Barnard Ltd as aircraft dealers, becoming the main UK agent for de Havilland. In 1931 the company became Brian Lewis and Company Ltd and merged with Selfridges Aviation Department, declaring itself as “The largest retailers in the world”. Based at Heston Aerodrome in Middlesex, the company expanded to Hooton Park Aerodrome, Liverpool and later to Renfrew Airport, Glasgow and Ipswich. It later moved from Heston to Elstree Aerodrome, then known as Aldenham.

In the late 1930s, Lewis was a motoring correspondent of the News Chronicle and a President of the Guild of Motoring Writers.

Lord Essendon succeeded his father in the peerage and barony in 1944. His main recreation was golf. He was a member of the Bath Club in London.

Lewis lived in London and at Avenue Eglantine 5, Lausanne, Switzerland. He died in Lausanne, Switzerland.

== Motorsports career results ==
- Third in the 1930 24 Hours of Le Mans in a Talbot.
- Third in the 1932 24 Hours of Le Mans in a Talbot.
- Third in the 1933 24 Hours of Le Mans in an Alfa Romeo.
- First in the 1933 Mannin Moar in an Alfa Romeo 8C 2300 Monza.
- Sixth in the 1933 Nice Grand Prix in an Alfa Romeo 8C 2300 Monza.
- First in the 1934 Mannin Moar in an Alfa Romeo Tipo B.
- First in the 1935 Mannin Moar in a Bugatti T59.
- Did not finish the 1935 Nice Grand Prix in a Maserati 8C.
- Did not finish the 1935 Swiss Grand Prix in a Maserati 8CM.
- Not classified in the 1935 Donington Grand Prix in a Riley.
- 15th in the 1936 Vanderbilt Cup in an ERA B-Type.

=== European Championship results ===
(key) (Races in bold indicate pole position) (Races in italics indicate fastest lap)

Year	Entrant	Chassis	Engine	1	2	3	4	5	6	7	EDC	Pts
1931	Earl Howe	Bugatti T51	Bugatti 2.3 L8	ITA	FRA; 12						—^{1}	
1931	Sir Henry Birkin	Alfa Romeo 8C-2300	Alfa Romeo 2.3 L8			BEL; 4					—^{1}	
1935	Earl Howe	Maserati 8CM	Maserati 3.0 L8	MON	FRA	BEL	GER	SUI; Ret	ITA	ESP	32nd	55

Notes

- **^1** – Lewis was co-driver with Howe at the French GP and with Birkin at the Belgian GP, therefore rules excluded him from the championship.

=== 24 Hours of Le Mans results ===
Year	Team	Co-Drivers	Car	Class	Laps	Pos.	Class Pos.
1929	(United Kingdom) Fox & Nichol	(United Kingdom) Tim Rose-Richards	Lagonda OH	2.0	29	DNF	DNF
1930	(United Kingdom) Fox & Nichol	(United Kingdom) Hugh Eaton	Talbot AO90	3.0	162	**3rd**	**1st**
1931	(United Kingdom) Fox & Nichol	(United Kingdom) Johnny Hindmarsh	Talbot AV105	3.0	132	DNF	DNF
1932	(United Kingdom) A. W. Fox	(United Kingdom) Tim Rose-Richards	Talbot AV105	3.0	180	**3rd**	**3rd**
1933	(United Kingdom) A. W. Fox	(United Kingdom) Tim Rose-Richards	Alfa Romeo 8C 2300	3.0	225	**3rd**	**3rd**
1934	(United Kingdom) A. W. Fox	(United Kingdom) Johnny Hindmarsh	Singer Le Mans 1½ Litre	1.5	195	7th	**3rd**
1935	(United Kingdom) Earl Howe	(United Kingdom) Earl Howe	Alfa Romeo 8C 2300 LM	3.0	129	DNF	DNF

Peerage of the United Kingdom
Preceded by Frederick Lewis	Baron Essendon; 1944–1978	Extinct
