= Nickel plating =

Nickel plating may refer to:

- Nickel electroplating, a technique of electroplating a thin layer of nickel onto a metal object
- Electroless nickel-phosphorus plating, an auto-catalytic chemical technique used to deposit a layer of nickel-phosphorus on a solid workpiece
- Electroless nickel-boron plating, an auto-catalytic chemical technique used to deposit a layer of nickel-boron alloy on a solid workpiece
