= Humphrey Cook =

Racing driver and Grand Prix team owner (1893–1978)

- Born: Humphrey Wyndham Cook; 16 March 1893 Chelsea, London
- Died: 13 August 1978 (aged 85) Westminster

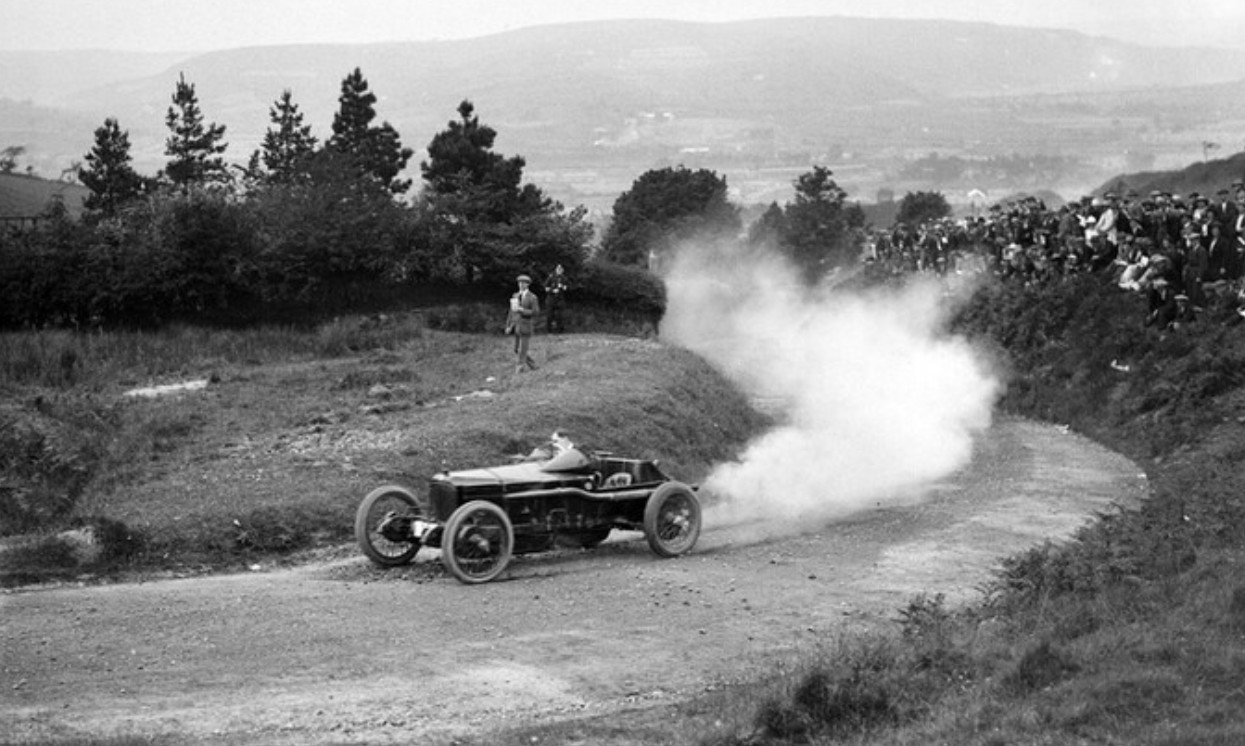
Humphrey Cook in the Vauxhall TT at a hillclimb in Caerphilly in 1923

Humphrey Wyndham Cook (16 March 1893 – 3 August 1978) was a British amateur racing driver, best known for being the financial support for English Racing Automobiles in the 1930s.

== Early life ==
Cook was of the junior line of the Cook baronetcy which owned the Cook, Son & Co. drapery business, based in St Paul's, London. His father died when Cook was 12, and he inherited a large fortune, which he later put to motor racing, not having any interest in continuing in business. He was educated at Harrow School and the Christ Church College, Oxford.

== Driving career ==
Cook was a regular racer at Brooklands, taking part in races there from 1914 to 1937. His best-known Brooklands special was a Vauxhall 30/98, known as Rouge Et Noir from its black and red colouration, which he bought in 1920. In 1923 he bought one of the Vauxhall TT models, which he dubbed Rouge Et Noir II, and in 1925 he approached Amherst Villiers to fit a supercharger, the result becoming the germ of the Vauxhall-Villiers Special used by Raymond Mays in sprint racing.

He also drove for the Bentley works team in 1929, finishing 3rd in the Brooklands 6-hour race with Leslie Callingham, and the Aston Martin works team in 1931. It was with Astons that he made his only appearance at the 24 Hours of Le Mans, finishing 4th in the 1.5 litre class (and 12th overall) with Jack Bezzant in Aston Martin LM6 in the 1931 race.

== English Racing Automobiles ==
In 1933 he provided Mays with the seed capital needed to set up the English Racing Automobiles enterprise. He had the honour to give the new E.R.A. its first start, at the 1934 B.R.D.C. British Empire Trophy on the Brooklands Outer Circuit, with Mays taking over for the second half; the car showed up well early but was not classified as a finisher. Cook's last drive, at the 1937 Albi Grand Prix, was his greatest success behind the wheel; the race was in two heats and Cook came third in the first in a new C-type, but Mays' own C-type was forced to retire, so Mays drove Cook's car in the second heat, and on aggregate times the pair took overall victory.

At the 1936 J.C.C. International Trophy race at Brooklands, Cook noticed that Prince Chula, running B. Bira's E.R.A., had mistakenly assumed that Mays in the works E.R.A. had fallen a lap behind after a late pit-stop; Cook told Chula of the true position, and that Bira should therefore speed up, to avoid being overtaken under false pretences. The advice worked as Bira held on to the victory by a second.

The cost of running the team was becoming too great even for Cook (by 1939 he had spent around £75,000), and in March 1939 a subscription fund was launched to raise £8,000 required to keep the team going, with Cook pledging a further £4,000 if the total were met. The failure of the public subscription, and a falling-out between Cook and Mays over future direction, led to Cook looking to withdraw, agreeing to fund the company on an interim basis; Mays and designer Peter Berthon duly left E.R.A. for their own project. After the interruption of the Second World War and an abortive attempt to license the E.R.A. name for road cars, Cook finally sold the enterprise to Leslie Johnson in 1947. Cook spent his later years involved in the running of the B.R.D.C., becoming vice-president.

== Personal life ==
Cook married twice; he married Gillian Hedderley in 1927, the couple having one son before divorcing, and Anne Blakely in 1941, which made him the step-father of David Blakely (an amateur racer who was killed by Ruth Ellis), and his two siblings.

== External sites ==
- Voiturette results
- Sports car results
