= Austin Dobson =

English racing driver (1912–1963)

- Born: Austin Dobson; 10 August 1912 Lodsworth, England
- Died: 13 May 1963 (aged 50) Cuckfield, England

Austin Dobson (19 August 1912 in Lodsworth, Sussex – 13 March 1963 in Cuckfield, Sussex) was a racing driver from England. He was the brother of Arthur Dobson, who was also a racing driver.

== Career ==
A poultry farmer, Dobson's career started in 1934, when he bought an Alfa Romeo Tipo B; the following year he bought a Maserati 8C which had previously been owned by Tim Birkin; at the end of the year he became a qualified autogyro pilot although in May 1935 he and his passenger had a narrow escape when they crashed into a Sussex field.

Dobson quickly stepped up to the Grand Prix formula, and made his Grand Prix debut at the 1935 Donington Grand Prix in the Alfa, crashing out. In 1936 he finished 6th in the 1936 Hungarian Grand Prix and 10th (sharing with Andrew Leitch, and flagged off before completing the distance) in the 1936 Donington Grand Prix.

In 1937, he bought the Alfa Romeo Bimotore, and had some success with it at Brooklands, finishing 6th in the 1937 International 500km Race with Chris Staniland, but at the end of the season sold it to Peter Aitken, who transformed it into the Alfa-Aitken. Dobson does not seem to have raced again.

== Results ==
- Single-seaters
