= Alfa Romeo P3 =

1932 Grand Prix car

Alfa Romeo P3
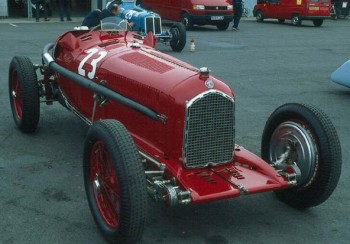
Category	Grand Prix 750 kg
Constructor	Alfa Romeo
Team/s	1932– Alfa Corse; 1933/1935 - Scuderia Ferrari
Designer	Vittorio Jano
Predecessor	Alfa Romeo Tipo A
Successor	1935 Monoposto 8C 35 Type C
Drivers	1932 + Tazio Nuvolari, Rudolf Caracciola, Giuseppe Campari, Baconin Borzacchini; 1933 + Louis Chiron, Luigi Fagioli, Giuseppe Campari; 1934 + Achille Varzi, Louis Chiron, Guy Moll, Brian E. Lewis, Carlo Felice Trossi, Gianfranco Comotti; 1935 + Tazio Nuvolari, Raymond Sommer, Louis Chiron, Comte George de Montbressieux, Richard Shuttleworth, René Dreyfus, Vittorio Belmondo, Mario Tadini, Antonio Brivio, Guido Barbieri, Pietro Ghersi, Renato Balestrero; 1936 + Raymond Sommer, "Charlie" Martin, Comte José María de Villapadierna, Giovanni Battaglia, Clemente Biondetti, Austin Dobson
Chassis	channel section side members
Suspension (front)	Semi elliptic leaf springs, friction dampers 1935 independent Dubonnet system with trailing links
Suspension (rear)	Semi elliptic leaf springs, friction dampers 1935 reversed quarter elliptic leaf springs
Engine	Front mounted, Alfa Romeo, Straight-8 (two straight 4 blocks), Twin Roots Superchargers 1932 - 2654 cc, (65x100mm); 1934 - 2905 cc, (68x100mm); 1935 - 3167 cc, (71x100mm) bored out for German Grand Prix
Gearbox	Alfa Romeo 4-speed manual c.1934 Alfa Romeo 3-speed manual
Wheelbase	104 in (2,642 mm)
Track	Front 55 in (1,397 mm), Rear 53 in (1,346 mm)
Dry Weight	1,545 lb (700 kg)
Fuel
Tyres	1932– Dunlop; 1933/35 - Englebert
Debut	1932 Italian Grand Prix, Tazio Nuvolari, 1st
Races competed
Constructors' Championships	Not applicable before 1958
Drivers' Championships	Not applicable before 1950
Race victories	46; 1932 Italian Grand Prix, Tazio Nuvolari; 1932 French Grand Prix, Tazio Nuvolari; 1932 German Grand Prix, Rudolf Caracciola; 1932 Coppa Ciano, Tazio Nuvolari; 1932 Coppa Acerbo, Tazio Nuvolari; 1932 Monza Grand Prix, Rudolf Caracciola; 1933 Coppa Acerbo, Luigi Fagioli; 1933 Grand Prix du Comminges, Luigi Fagioli; 1933 Marseille Grand Prix, Louis Chiron; 1933 Italian Grand Prix, Luigi Fagioli; 1933 Masaryk Circuit, Louis Chiron; 1933 Spanish Grand Prix, Louis Chiron; 1934 Monaco Grand Prix, Guy Moll; 1934 Alessandria Grand Prix, Achille Varzi; 1934 Tripoli Grand Prix, Achille Varzi; 1934 Casablanca Grand Prix, Louis Chiron; 1934 Targa Florio, Achille Varzi; 1934 Internationale Avus Rennen, Guy Moll; 1934 Mannin Moar, Hon. Brian Lewis; 1934 Montreux Grand Prix, Comte Trossi; 1934 Penya Rhin GP, Achille Varzi; 1934 Grand Prix de France, Louis Chiron; 1934 Grand Prix de la Marne, Louis Chiron; 1934 GP de Vichy, Comte Carlo Trossi, 1934 German Grand Prix, Tazio Nuvolari; 1934 Coppa Ciano, Achille Varzi; 1934 Grand Prix de Nice, Achille Varzi; 1934 Grand Prix du Comminges, Gianfranco Comotti; 1934 Circuito di Biella, Comte Trossi, 1935 Grand Prix du Pau, Tazio Nuvolari; 1935 Bergamo Circuit, Tazio Nuvolari; 1935 GP de France, Raymond Sommer; 1935 Biella Circuit, Tazio Nuvolari; 1935 Lorraine GP, Louis Chiron; 1935 Marne GP, René Dreyfus; 1935 Dieppe GP, René Dreyfus; 1935 Varese Circuit, Vittorio Belmondo; 1935 German Grand Prix, Tazio Nuvolari; 1935 GP du Comminges, Raymond Sommer; 1935 Coppa Ciano, Tazio Nuvolari; 1935 Nice GP, Tazio Nuvolari; 1935 Coppa Edda Ciano, Mario Tadini; 1935 Donington GP, Richard Shuttleworth; 1935 Coppa della Sila, Antonio Brivio; 1935 Brooklands Mountain Circuit Championship, Richard Shuttleworth
Last season	1935

The Alfa Romeo P3, P3 monoposto or Tipo B was a classic Grand Prix car designed by Vittorio Jano, one of the Alfa Romeo 8C models. The P3 is considered to be the world's first genuine single-seat Grand Prix racing car and was Alfa Romeo's second monoposto after the Tipo A monoposto (1931). It was based on the earlier successful Alfa Romeo P2. Taking lessons learned from that car, Jano went back to the drawing board to design a car that could last longer race distances.

== Description ==
1932 Alfa Romeo P3 s/n 5006 at Laguna Seca in 2009.

The P3 was the first genuine single seater racing car, and was powered by a supercharged eight-cylinder engine. The car was very light for the period, weighing just over 1,500 lb (680 kg) despite using a cast iron engine block.

Introduced halfway through the European 1932 Grand Prix season in June, the P3 won its first race at the hands of Tazio Nuvolari and went on to win 6 races in total in that year, driven by both Nuvolari and Rudolf Caracciola. These victories included all three major Grands Prix in Italy, France and Germany.

The 1933 Grand Prix season brought financial difficulties to Alfa Corse, so the cars were simply locked away and Alfa intended to rest on their laurels. Enzo Ferrari had to run his breakaway 'works' Alfa team as Scuderia Ferrari, using the older, less effective Alfa Monzas. Alfa procrastinated until August and missed the first 25 events, and only after much wrangling was the P3 finally handed over to Scuderia Ferrari. P3s then won six of the final 11 events of the season including the final 2 major Grands Prix in Italy and Spain.

The regulations for the 1934 Grand Prix season brought larger bodywork requirements, so to counteract this, the engine was bored out to 2.9 litres. Louis Chiron won the French Grand Prix at Montlhery, whilst the German Silver Arrows dominated the other four rounds of the European Championship. However, the P3s won 18 of all the 35 Grands Prix held throughout Europe.

By the 1935 Grand Prix season the P3 was hopelessly uncompetitive against the superior German cars in 6 rounds of the European Championship, but that didn't stop one final, legendary works victory. The P3 was bored out to 3.2 litres for Nuvolari for the 1935 German Grand Prix at the Nürburgring, in the heartland of the Mercedes and Auto-Union empire. In the race, Nuvolari punctured a tyre early on while leading, but after his next pitstop he carved back through the field until the last lap when Manfred von Brauchitsch, driving the more powerful Mercedes Benz W25, suffered a puncture, leaving Nuvolari to win the race in front of 300,000 stunned Germans.

The P3's agility and versatility enabled it to win 16 of the 39 Grands Prix in 1935.

== Technical data ==
Technical data	1932	1934	1935	
Engine:	Front mounted 8-cylinder in-line engine			
displacement:	2654 cm^{3}	2905 cm^{3}	3167 cm^{3}	3822 cm^{3}
Bore x stroke:	65 x 100mm	68 x 100mm	71 x 100mm	78 x 100 mm
Max power:	215 hp	255 hp	265 hp	330 hp
Valve control:	2 overhead camshafts, 2 valves per cylinder			
Upload:	2 Roots compressors			
Gearbox:	4-speed manual	3-speed manual		
suspension front:	Stiff front axle		Individual, type Dubonnet	
Front suspension:	Longitudinal leaf springs		Coil springs	
suspension rear:	Stiff rear axle			
Rear suspension:	Longitudinal leaf springs		Cantilever Suspension	
Brakes:	Hydraulic drum brakes			
Wheelbase:	264-266 cm		267 cm	
Dry weight:	About 700 kg			
Top speed:	230 km/h	? km/h	? km/h	? km/h

== Drivers ==
- 1932: Tazio Nuvolari, Rudolf Caracciola, Giuseppe Campari, Baconin Borzacchini
- 1933: Louis Chiron, Luigi Fagioli, Giuseppe Campari
- 1934: Achille Varzi, Louis Chiron, Guy Moll, Brian E. Lewis, Carlo Felice Trossi, Gianfranco Comotti
- 1935: Tazio Nuvolari, Raymond Sommer, Louis Chiron, Comte George de Montbressieux, Richard Shuttleworth, René Dreyfus, Vittorio Belmondo, Mario Tadini, Antonio Brivio, Guido Barbieri, Pietro Ghersi, Renato Balestrero
- 1936: Raymond Sommer, "Charlie" Martin, José Padierna de Villapadierna, Giovanni Battaglia, Clemente Biondetti, Austin Dobson
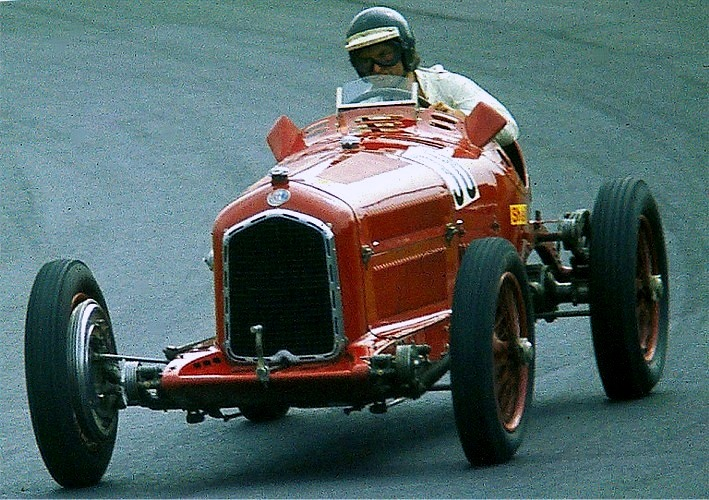
Alain de Cadenet driving an Alfa Romeo P3.

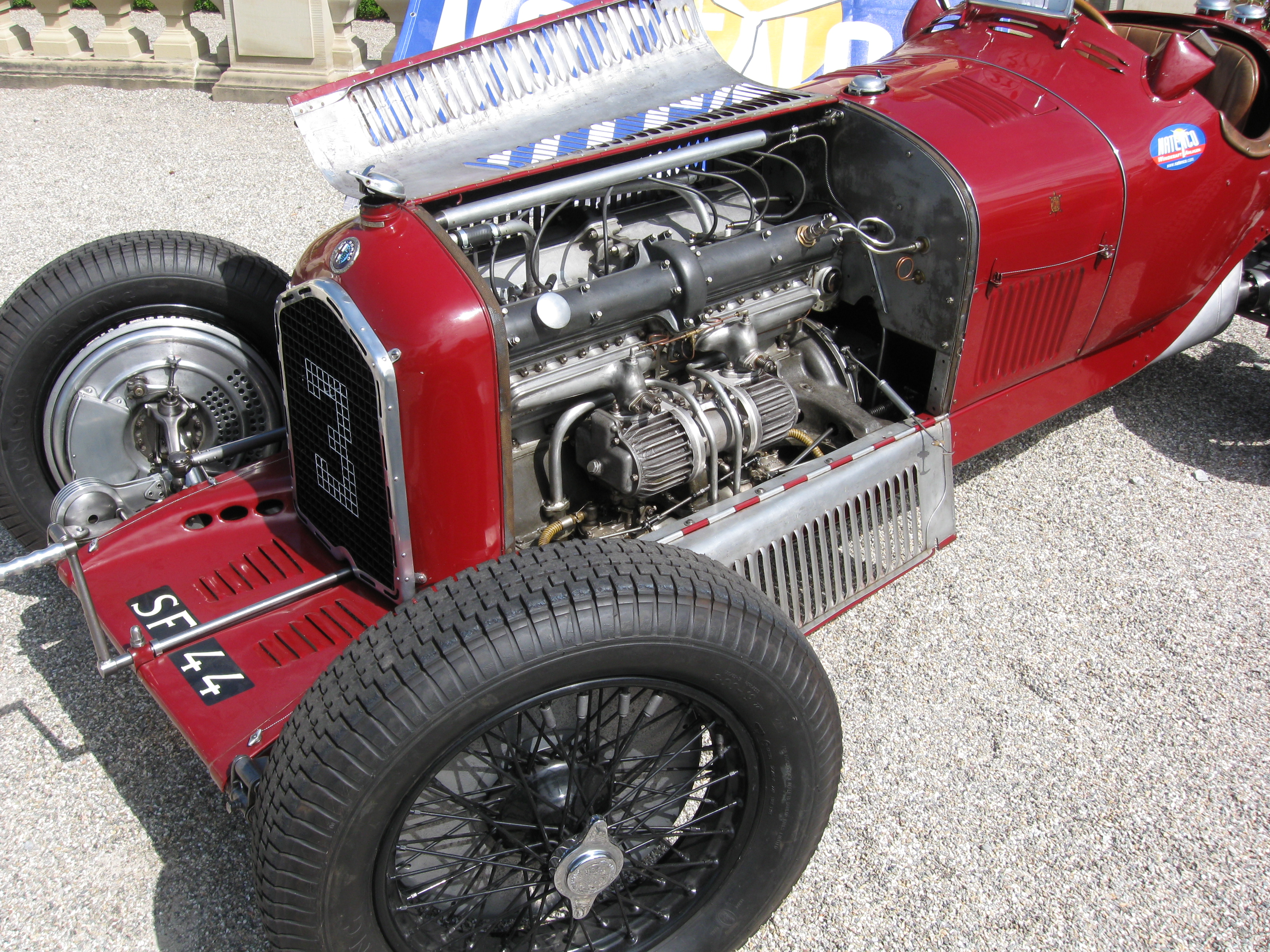
Engine of the Alfa P3 Tipo B - Note the twin gear driven superchargers.

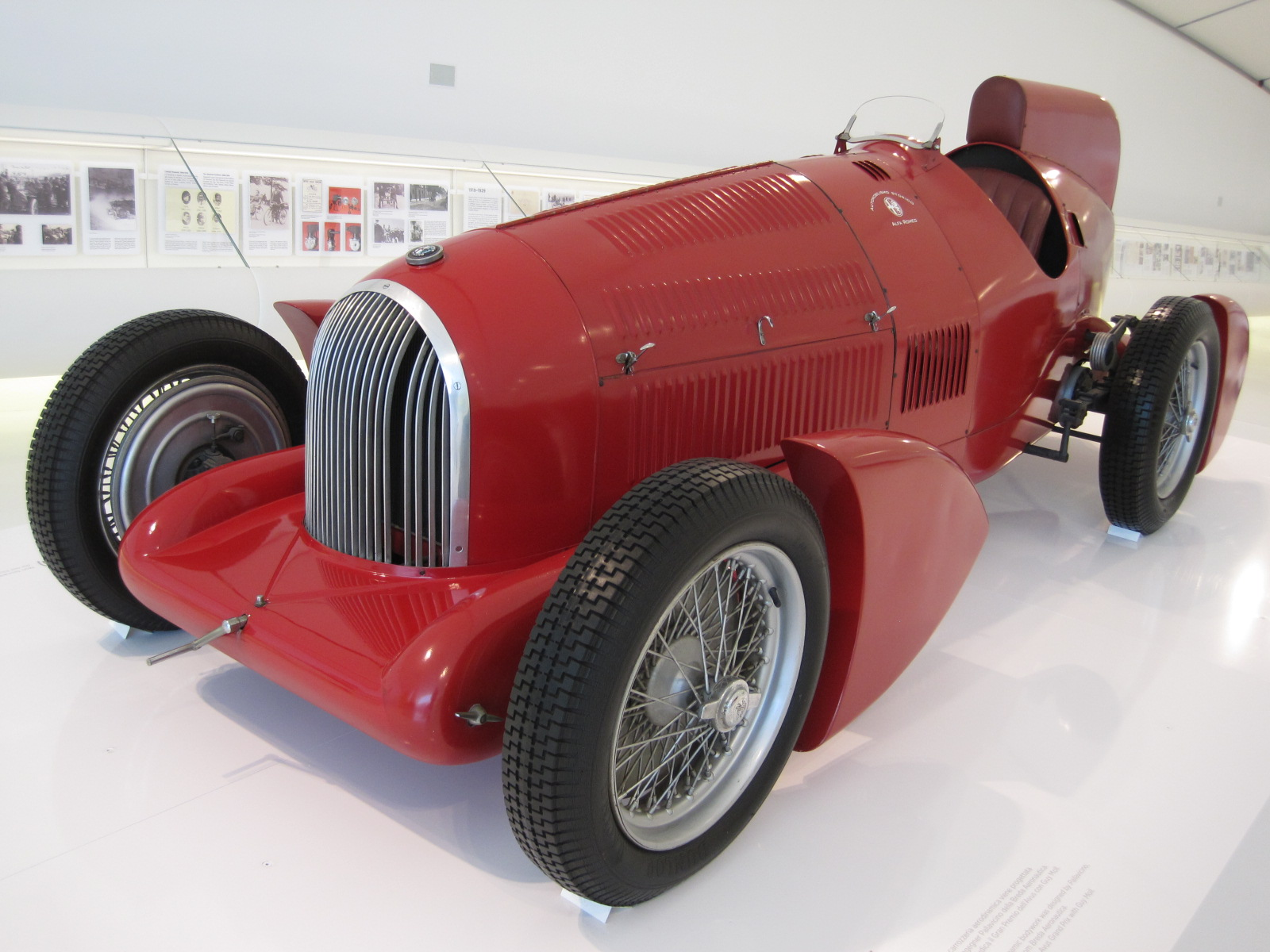
The Tipo B Aerodinamica variant with Guy Moll won the Avus GP in 1934.

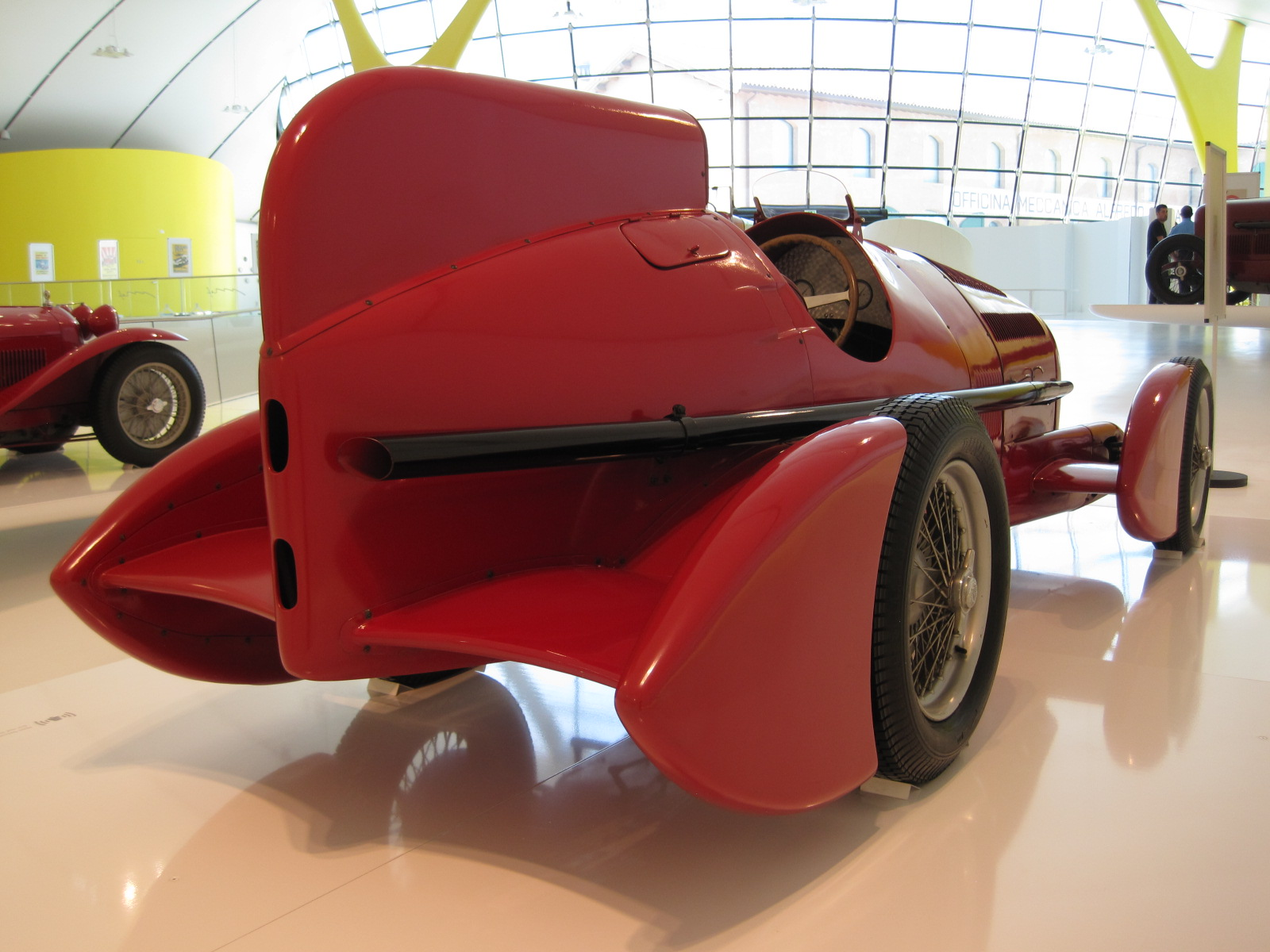
The Tipo B Aerodinamica in the Enzo Ferrari Museum in Modena.

1932 Tipo B Don Lee Special at the 2011 Goodwood FoS

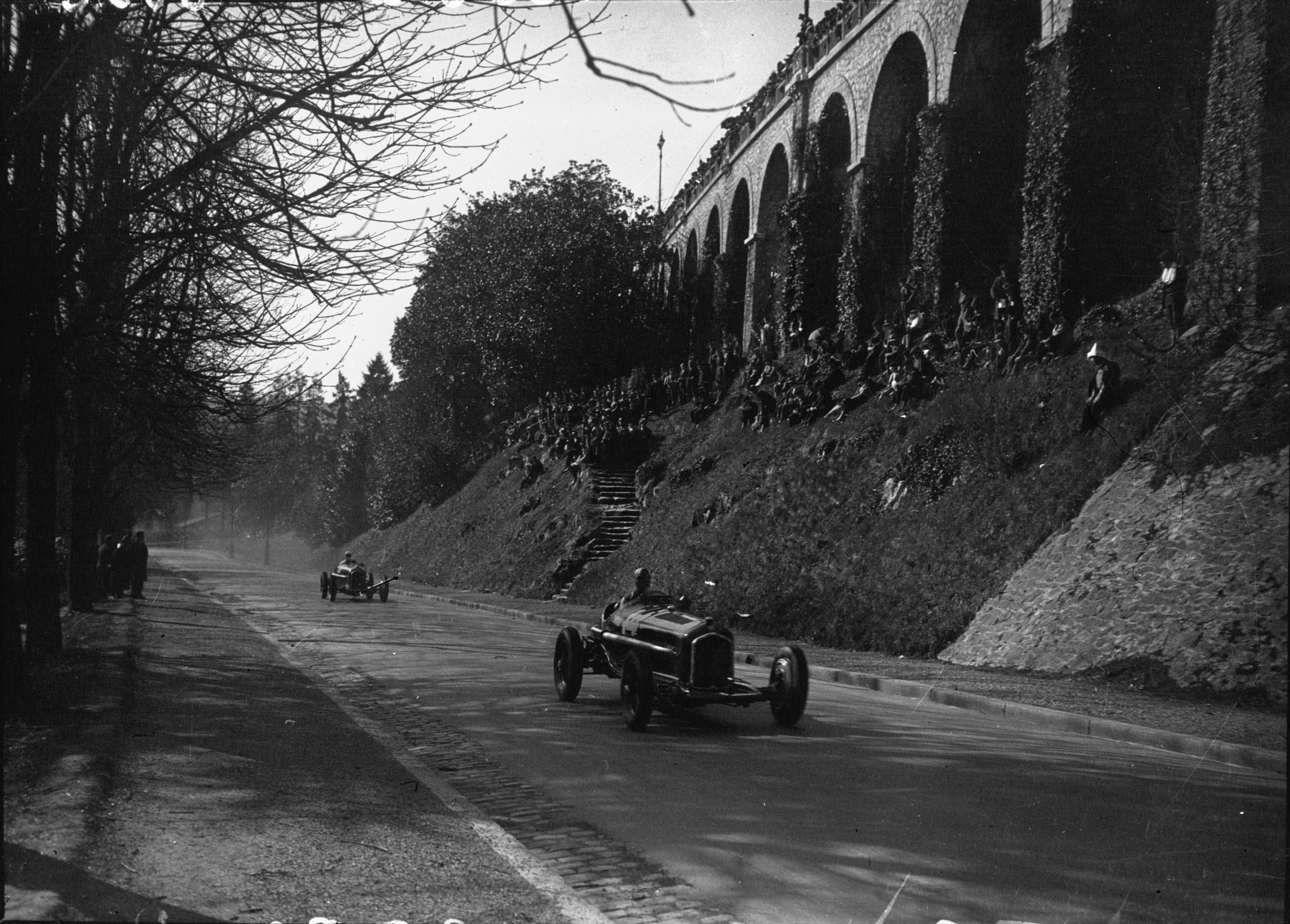
Tazio Nuvolari passing at the 1935 Grand Prix de Pau.
