= Bugatti Type 51 =

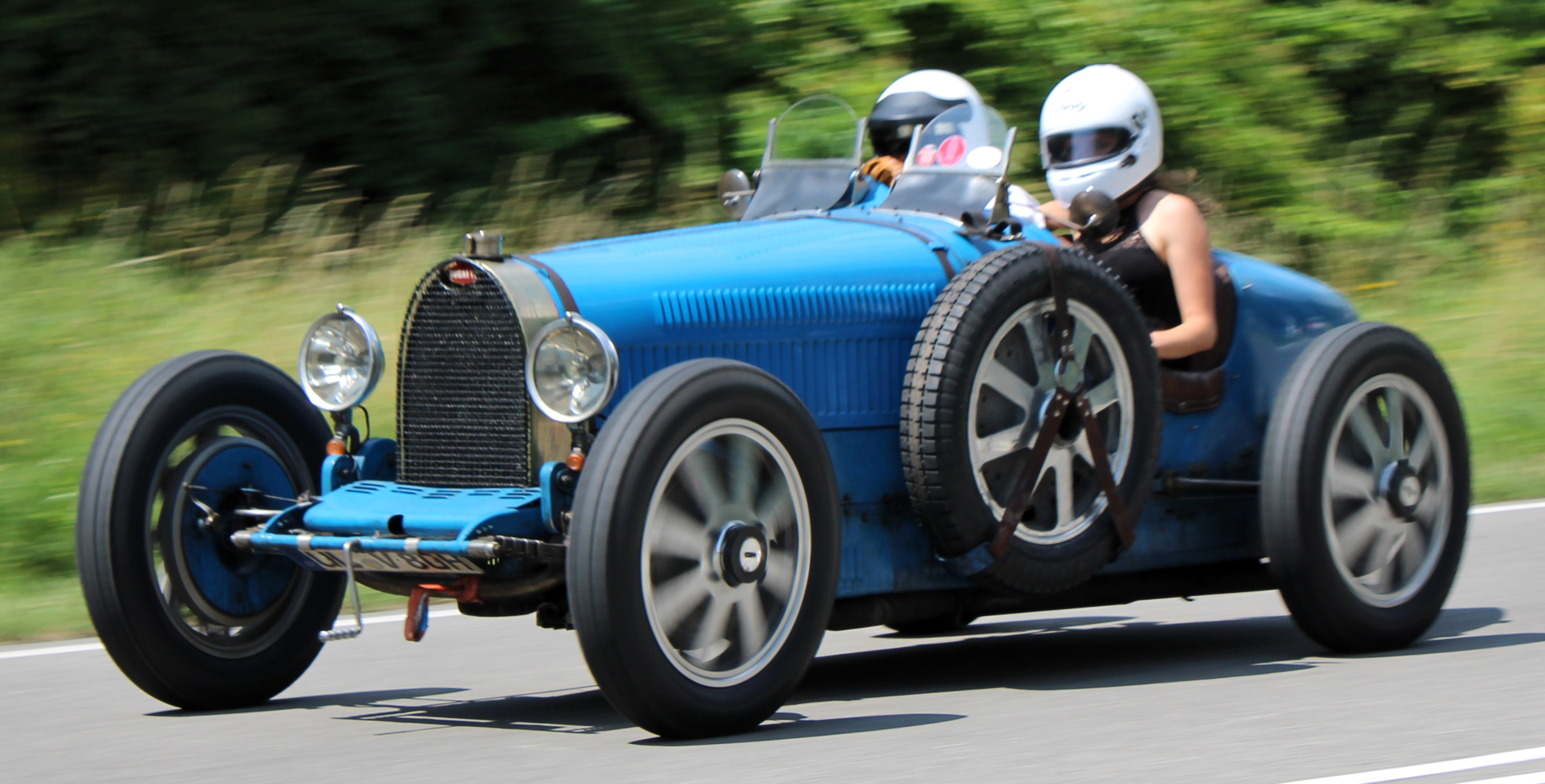

Overview
- Manufacturer: Automobiles Ettore Bugatti
- Production: 1931–1935; 40 produced
- Assembly: France: Molsheim, Alsace (Usine Bugatti de Molsheim)
- Designer: Ettore Bugatti, Jean Bugatti

Body and chassis
- Class: Grand Prix, Formula Libre
- Body style: Underslung type
- Layout: FR
- Chassis: Steel ladder frame, aluminum body

Powertrain
- Engine: 1.5–2.3 L (92–140 cu in) 16-valve DOHC straight-8 engine, 130–185 hp (97–138 kW)
- Transmission: 4-speed manual + reverse

Dimensions
- Wheelbase: 2,400 mm (94 in)
- Length: 3,700 mm (150 in)
- Width: 1,500 mm (59 in)
- Curb weight: 750–850 kg (1,650–1,870 lb)

Chronology
- Predecessor: Bugatti Type 35
- Successor: Bugatti Type 59

The Bugatti Type 51 series succeeded the famous Type 35 as Bugatti's premier racing car for the 1930s. The main distinction is that it uses a twin cam engine. Unlike the dominant Type 35s of the prior decade, the Type 51 (and later Type 53, Type 54, and Type 59) were unable to compete with the government-supported German and Italian offerings.

== Type 51 ==
The first Type 51 went into production in 1931 with Ettore Bugatti's son Jean Bugatti taking more responsibility. Its engine was a 160 hp (119 kW) twin overhead cam evolution of the supercharged 2.3 L (2262 cc/138 in³, 60 x 100 mm) single overhead cam straight-8 found in the Type 35B. Inspiration for this new design thinking came from two Miller 91 racing cars. Ettore Bugatti had acquired them in 1929 from American racer Leon Duray in exchange for three Bugatti Type 43s. Jean Bugatti had the advanced American DOHC engines disassembled and studied in Molsheim, using Miller’s cylinder head and hemispherical combustion chamber architecture as a direct template for the new Type 51 powerplant. Because of this, the Bugatti Type 51 is sometimes referred to as "the Millerhead".

A victory in the 1931 French Grand Prix was a good start for the type, and it notably won the 1933 Monaco Grand Prix with Achille Varzi beating Tazio Nuvolari in a Homeric struggle against the new challenge of the Alfa Romeo 8C.

About 40 examples of the Type 51 and 51A were produced. The Type 51 is visually very similar to the Type 35. The obvious external differences of a Type 51 are: the supercharger blow-off outlet is lower the bonnet in the louvered section; one piece cast wheels instead of bolted on rims; twin fuel caps behind the driver and finally the magneto being off-set to the left on the dash. However many Type 35 cars have been fitted with later wheels, so that is not a reliable signal. One Type 51 would be modified into a roadgoing sports car, known as the Bugatti Type 51 Dubos.

One Type 51 would be modified into a roadgoing sports car, known as the Bugatti Type 51 Dubos Coupe.

== Type 54 ==
Bugatti Type 54
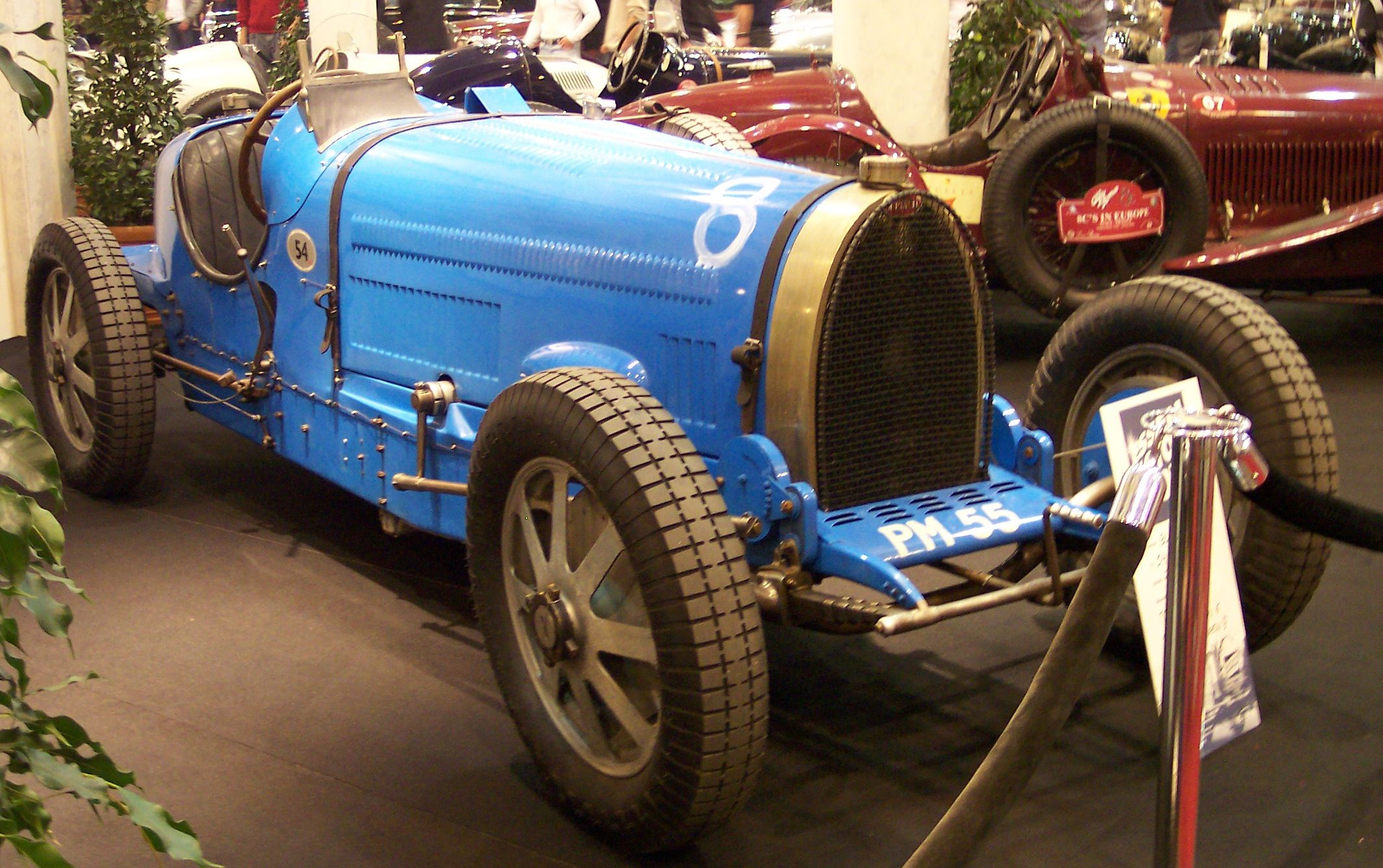

Overview
- Manufacturer: Automobiles Ettore Bugatti
- Production: 1931
- Assembly: France: Molsheim, Alsace (Usine Bugatti de Molsheim)
- Designer: Ettore Bugatti

Body and chassis
- Class: Grand Prix
- Body style: Underslug type
- Layout: FR
- Chassis: Steel ladder frame, aluminum body

Powertrain
- Engine: 4.9 L (300 cu in) 16-valve DOHC straight-8, mid-engined, rear-wheel-drive
- Transmission: 3-speed manual + reverse

Dimensions
- Wheelbase: 2,750 mm (108 in)
- Curb weight: 950 kg (2,090 lb)

Grand Prix car of 1931, fitted with a twin overhead-cam 4.9-liter (4,972cc, 86 x 107 mm) engine delivering 300 hp (223 kW). Four or five were built. Chassis number 54201 was the first type 54 built and was the works car for Achille Varzi, factory number plate 4311-NV1

1931 Bugatti Type 51
Bugatti Type 51 at Goodwood Festival of Speed 2009

== Type 59 ==
Bugatti Type 59
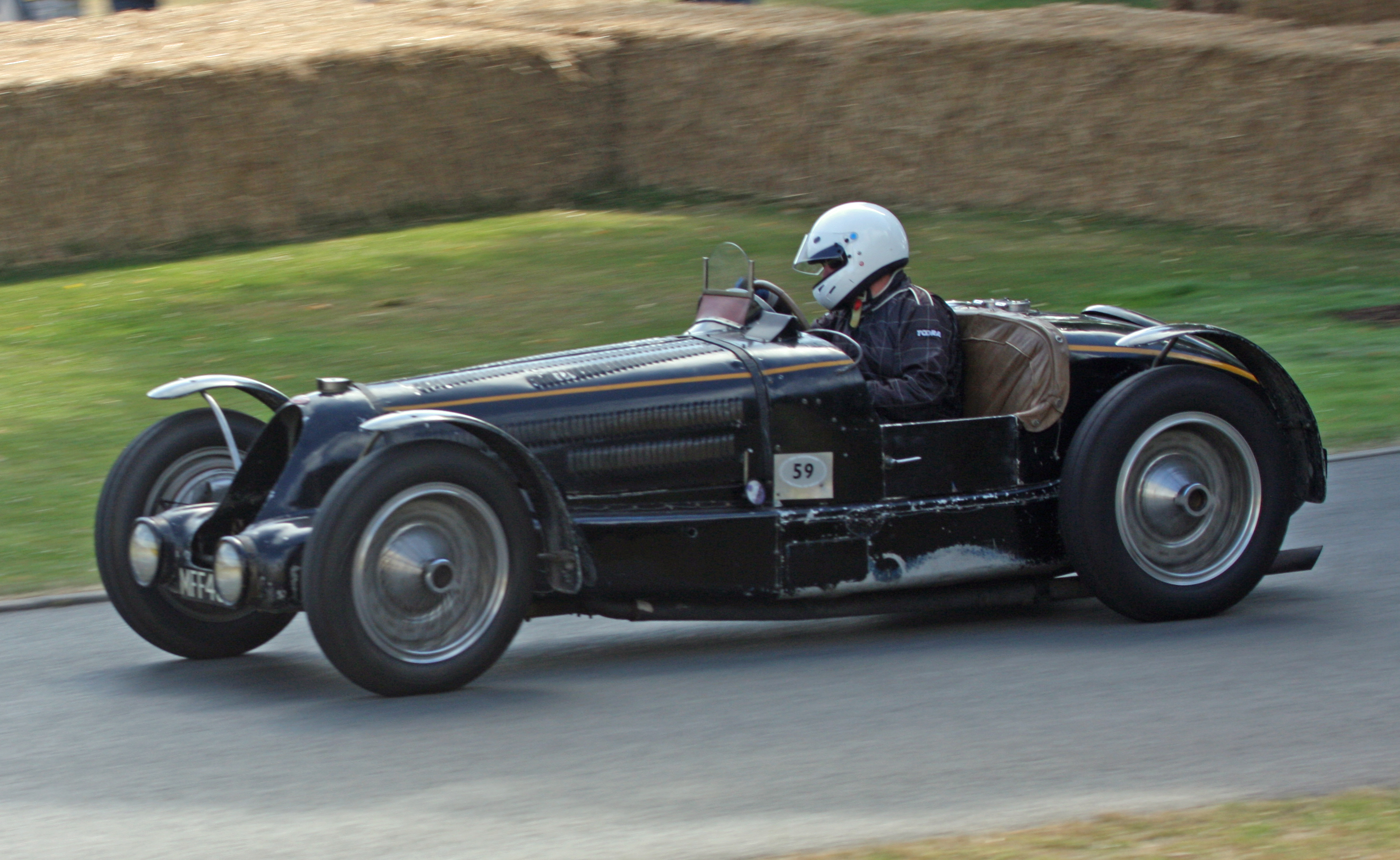

Overview
- Manufacturer: Automobiles Ettore Bugatti
- Production: 1933–1936
- Assembly: France: Molsheim, Alsace (Usine Bugatti de Molsheim)
- Designer: Ettore Bugatti

Body and chassis
- Class: Grand Prix
- Body style: Underslug type
- Layout: FR
- Chassis: Steel ladder frame, aluminum body

Powertrain
- Engine: 3.3 L (200 cu in) 16-valve supercharged DOHC straight-8, mid-engined, rear-wheel-drive
- Transmission: 4-speed manual + reverse

Dimensions
- Wheelbase: 2,750 mm (108 in)
- Length: 3,744 mm (147.4 in)
- Height: 823 mm (32.4 in)
- Curb weight: 748 kg (1,649 lb)

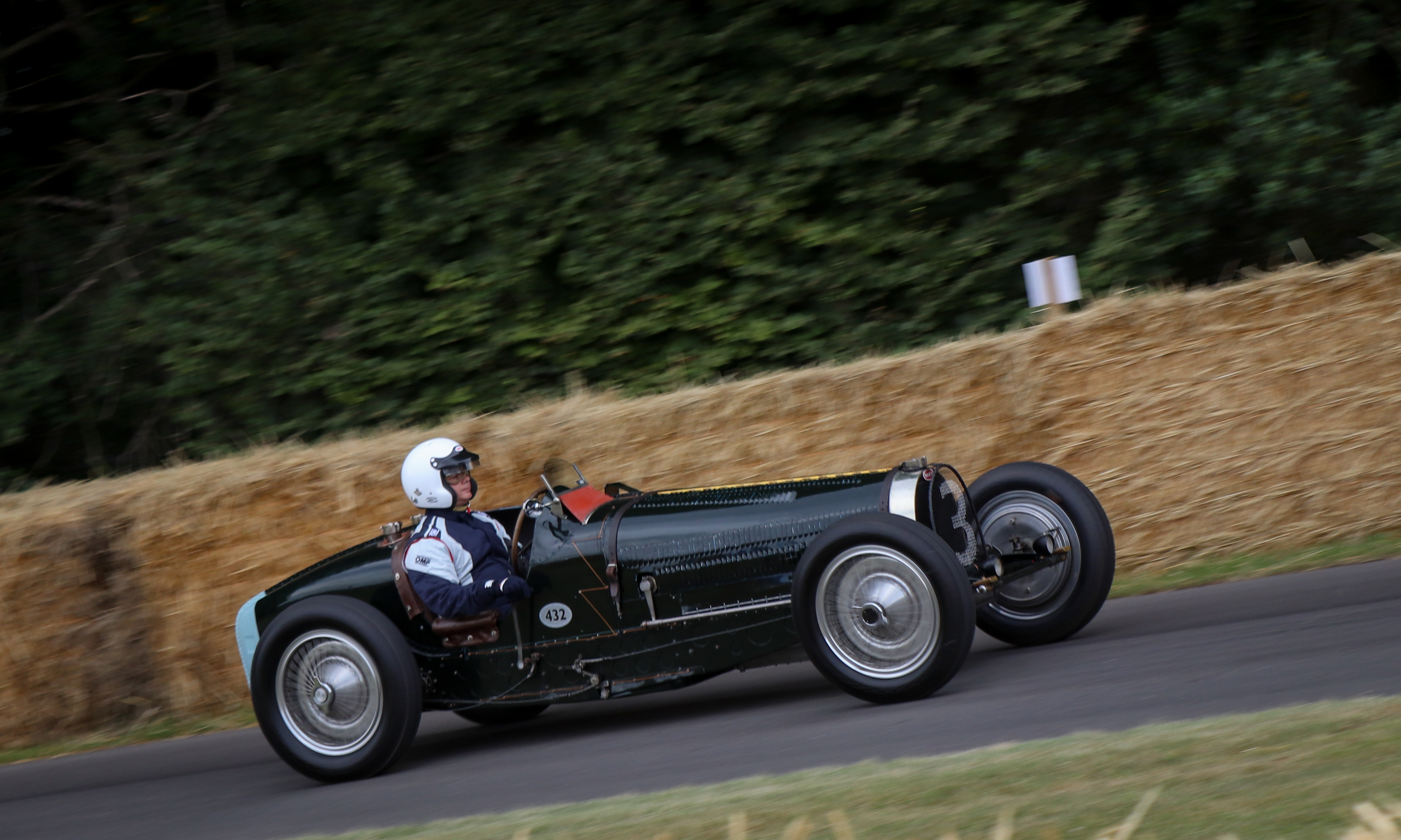
Bugatti Type 59 at the 2019 Goodwood Festival of Speed

The final Bugatti race car of the 1930s was the Type 59 of 1934. It used an enlarged 3.3 L (3257 cc/198 in^{3}, 72 x 100 mm) version of the straight-eight Type 57's engine sitting in a modified Type 54 chassis. The engine was lowered for a better center of gravity, and the frame was lightened with a number of holes drilled in the chassis. The signature piano wire wheels used splines between the brake drum and rim, and relied on the radial spokes to handle cornering loads. 250 hp (186 kW) was on tap, and eight were made.

On 5 September 2020 a Bugatti T59, built in 1934, was auctioned for 8,5 million pound by Gooding & Company. The car had been used by the Bugatti racing team in 1934–193. Being driven by René Dreyfus it won the 1934 Belgian Grand Prix after the German teams had withdrawn due to Belgian taxes on their racing fuel. It was later rebuilt as a sportscar by Bugatti and sold to King Leopold III of Belgium

1933 Bugatti Type 59 Grand Prix racer from the Ralph Lauren collection

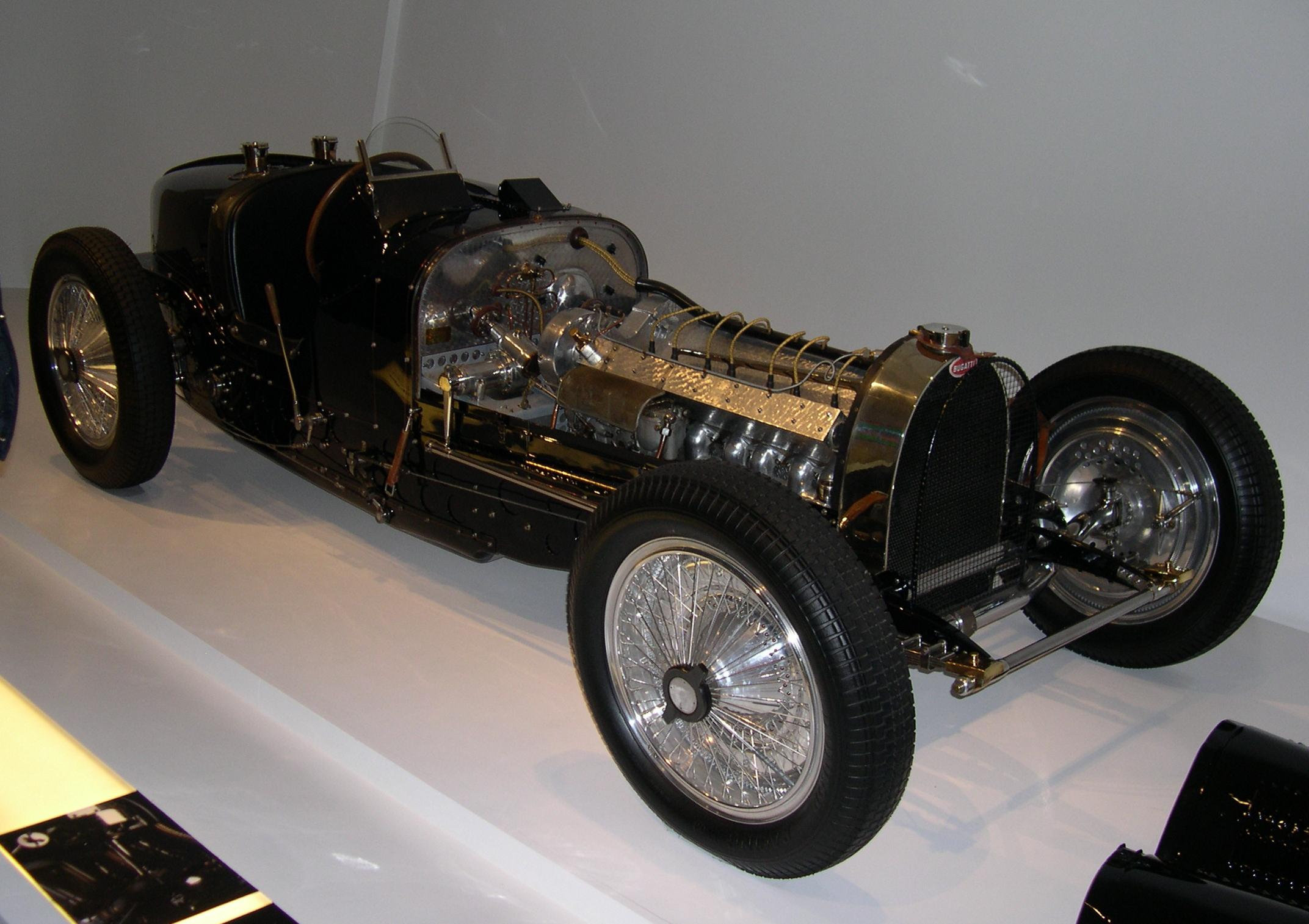

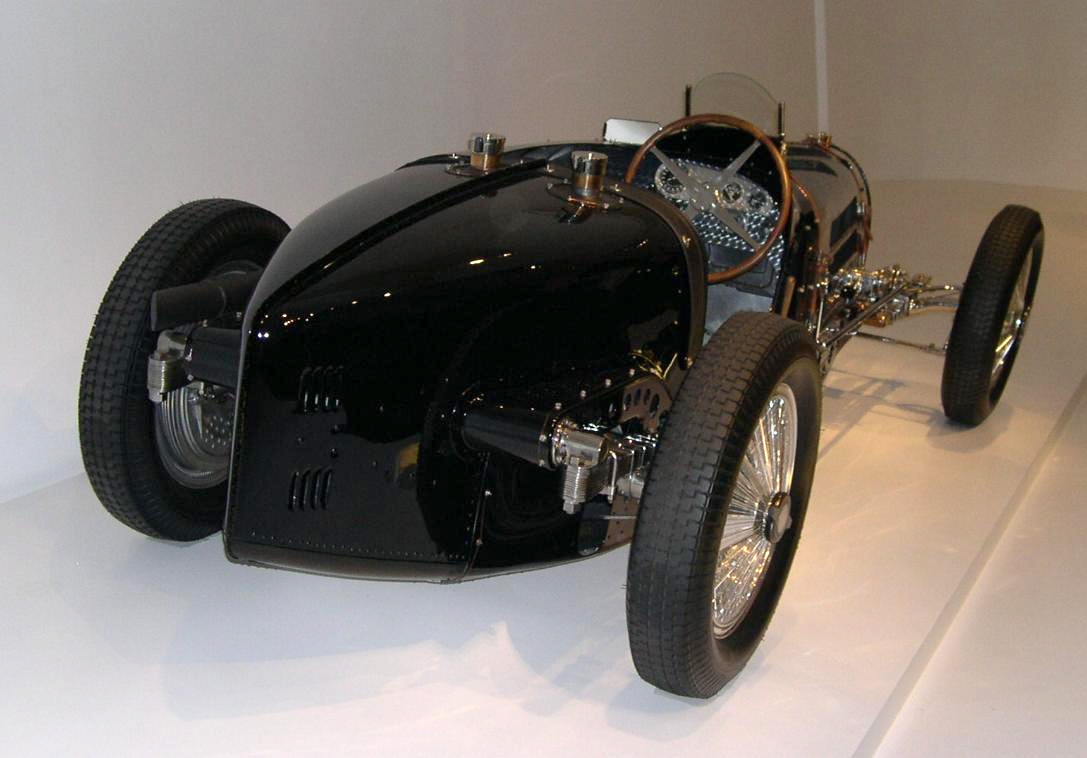

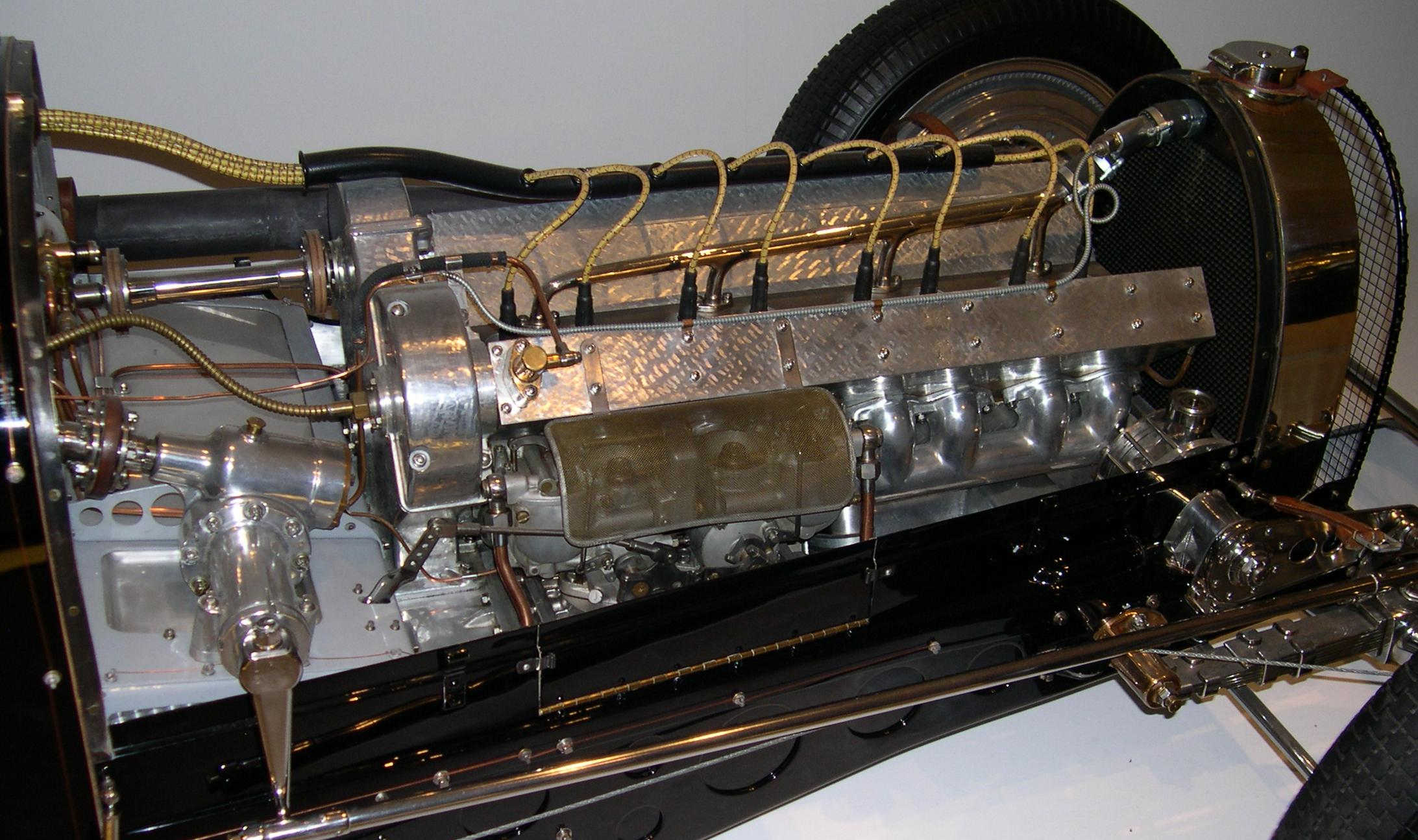

== Technical data ==
	Type 51	Type 54	Type 59
Engine:	Front mounted inline-8
displacement:	2262 cc (138 cu in)	4972 cc (303 cu in)	3257 cc (199 cu in)
Bore x stroke:	60 x 100 mm	86 x 107 mm	72 x 100 mm
Max power at rpm:	185 hp at 5500 rpm	300 hp at 4000 rpm	250 hp at 5500 rpm
Valve control:	2 overhead camshafts, 2 valves per cylinder, DOHC
Compression:	7.5:1		8.5:1
Carburetor:	Zenith	2 Zenith
Induction system:	Roots compressor
Gearbox:	4-speed manual
Suspension front:	Rigid axle, semi-elliptic springs	Solid axle, semi-elliptic leaf springs, friction dampers
Suspension rear:	Live axle, reversed quarter elliptic springs	Live axle, quarter elliptic leaf springs, friction dampers	Live axle, radius arms, reversed quarter-elliptic leaf springs
Brakes:	Drums, all-round
Chassis & body:	Aluminium body on steel ladder frame
Wheelbase:	240 cm (94 in)	275 cm (108 in)
Dry weight:	750 kg (1653 lbs)	950 kg (2094 lbs)	748 kg (1649 lbs)
Top speed:	217 km/h (135 mph)	241 km/h (150 mph)	209 km/h (130 mph)

== See also ==
- Bugatti Type 53 – Four wheel drive Type 51 racer
- Bugatti Type 57 – luxury 1930s car
