= George Lang =

George Lang may refer to:

- George C. Lang (1947–2005), United States Army soldier and Medal of Honor recipient
- George Dunmore Lang (1832–1875), Australian politician
- George H. Lang (1874–1958), British Bible teacher and writer
- George Lang (cinematographer), American cinematographer
- George Lang (restaurateur) (1924–2011), Hungarian-American restaurateur
- George Lang (Ohio politician), member of the Ohio Senate
- George Lang (cricketer), English cricketer
- George Lang (builder) (1821–1881), Scottish stonemason and master builder
