= Robert Henley-Ongley, 1st Baron Ongley =

British politician

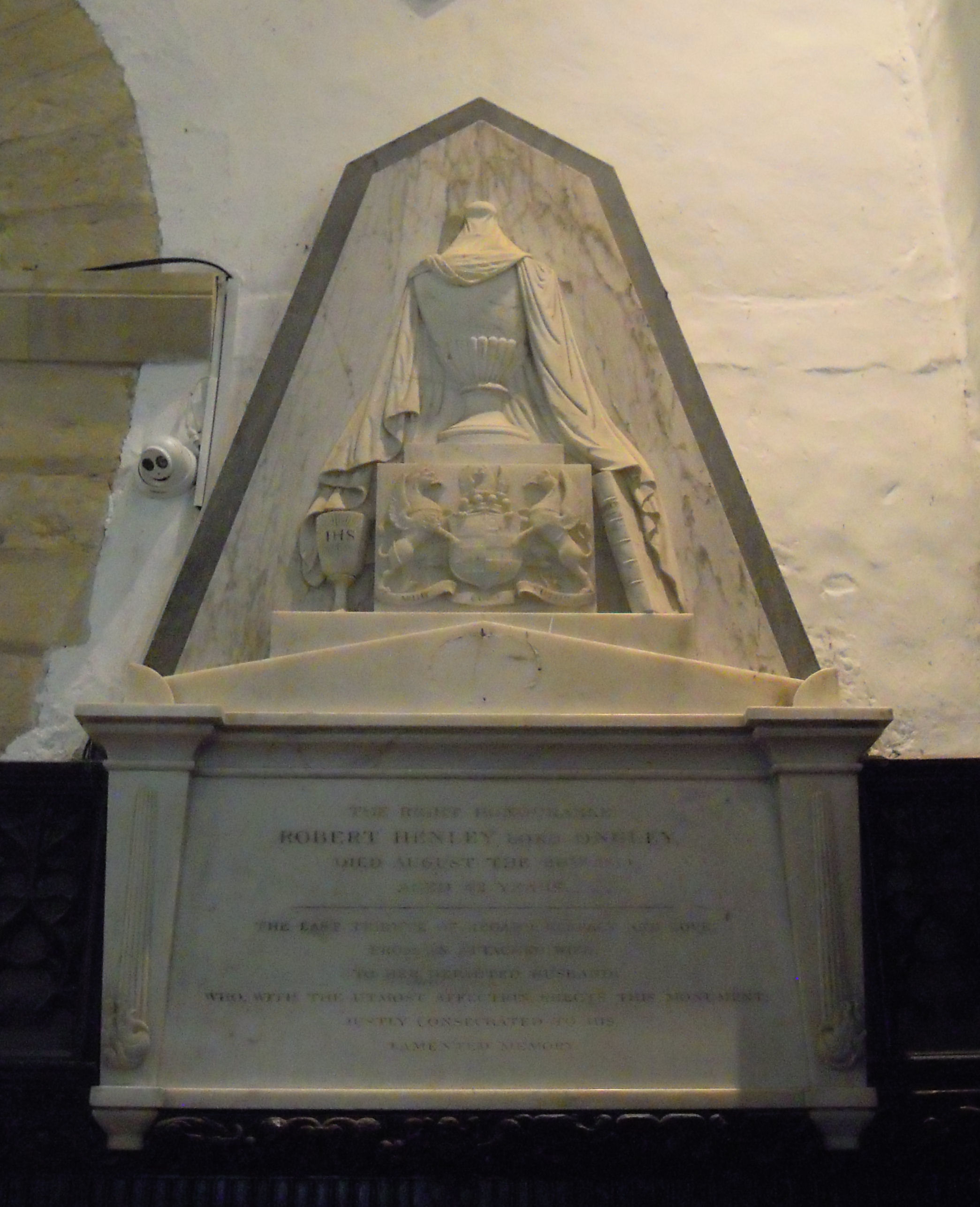
Robert Henley-Ongley's memorial in St Leonard's church at Old Warden

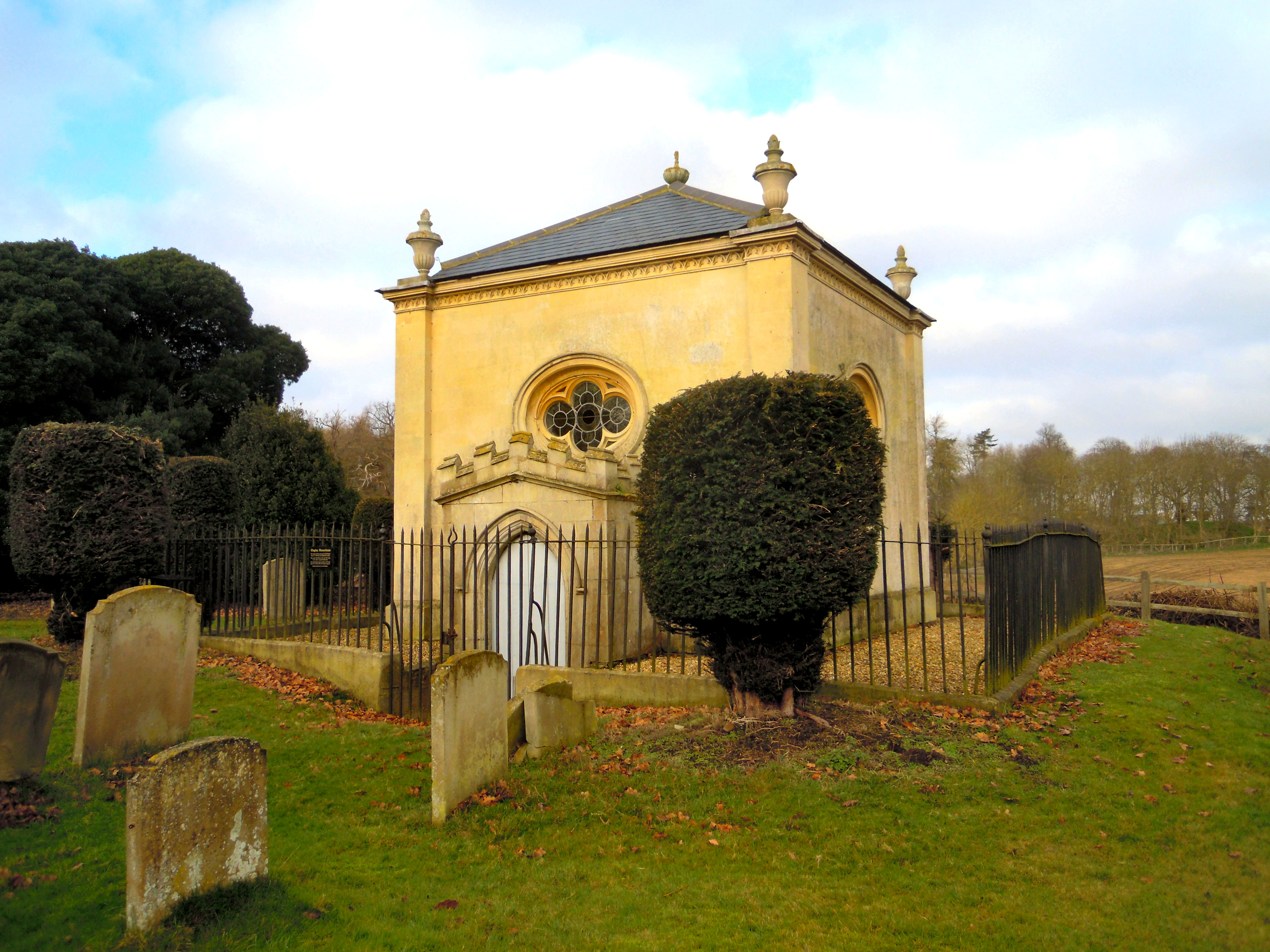
Robert Henley-Ongley is buried in the Ongley Mausoleum in the churchyard of St Leonard's church

Robert Henley-Ongley, 1st Baron Ongley (c. 1721 – 23 October 1785), was a British politician.

Born Robert Henley, the son of Robert Henley of London, he assumed the additional surname of Ongley as heir to the estate of his great-uncle, Sir Samuel Ongley, of Old Warden, Bedfordshire. He was educated at Christ Church, Oxford and studied law at the Middle Temple.

He was returned to Parliament for Bedford in 1754, a seat he held until 1761, and then sat as a Knight of the Shire for Bedfordshire between 1761 and 1780 and again between 1784 and 1785. In 1776 he was elevated to the Irish peerage as Baron Ongley, of Old Warden. (An Irish peerage did not oblige him to give up his seat in the House of Commons).

Lord Ongley married Frances Gosfright, daughter and co-heir of Richard Gosfright, of Langton Hall, Essex, in 1763. They had two sons and four daughters. He died in October 1785 and was buried in a mausoleum in the churchyard of St Leonard's church in Old Warden in Bedfordshire, built at his request by his widow in 1787. He was succeeded in the barony by his eldest son, Robert.

Parliament of Great Britain
Preceded by Thomas Gore; John Offley	Member of Parliament for Bedford; 1754–1761; With: Francis Herne	Succeeded by Francis Herne; Richard Vernon
Preceded by Henry Osborn; Sir Thomas Alston, Bt	Member of Parliament for Bedfordshire; 1761–1780; With: The Marquess of Tavistock 1761–1767; The Earl of Upper Ossory 1767–1780	Succeeded by The Earl of Upper Ossory; Hon. St Andrew St John
Preceded by The Earl of Upper Ossory; Hon. St Andrew St John	Member of Parliament for Bedfordshire; 1784–1785; With: The Earl of Upper Ossory	Succeeded by The Earl of Upper Ossory; Hon. St Andrew St John
Peerage of Ireland
New creation	Baron Ongley; 1776–1785	Succeeded by Robert Henley-Ongley
