= Robert Lang (cricketer) =

English cricketer

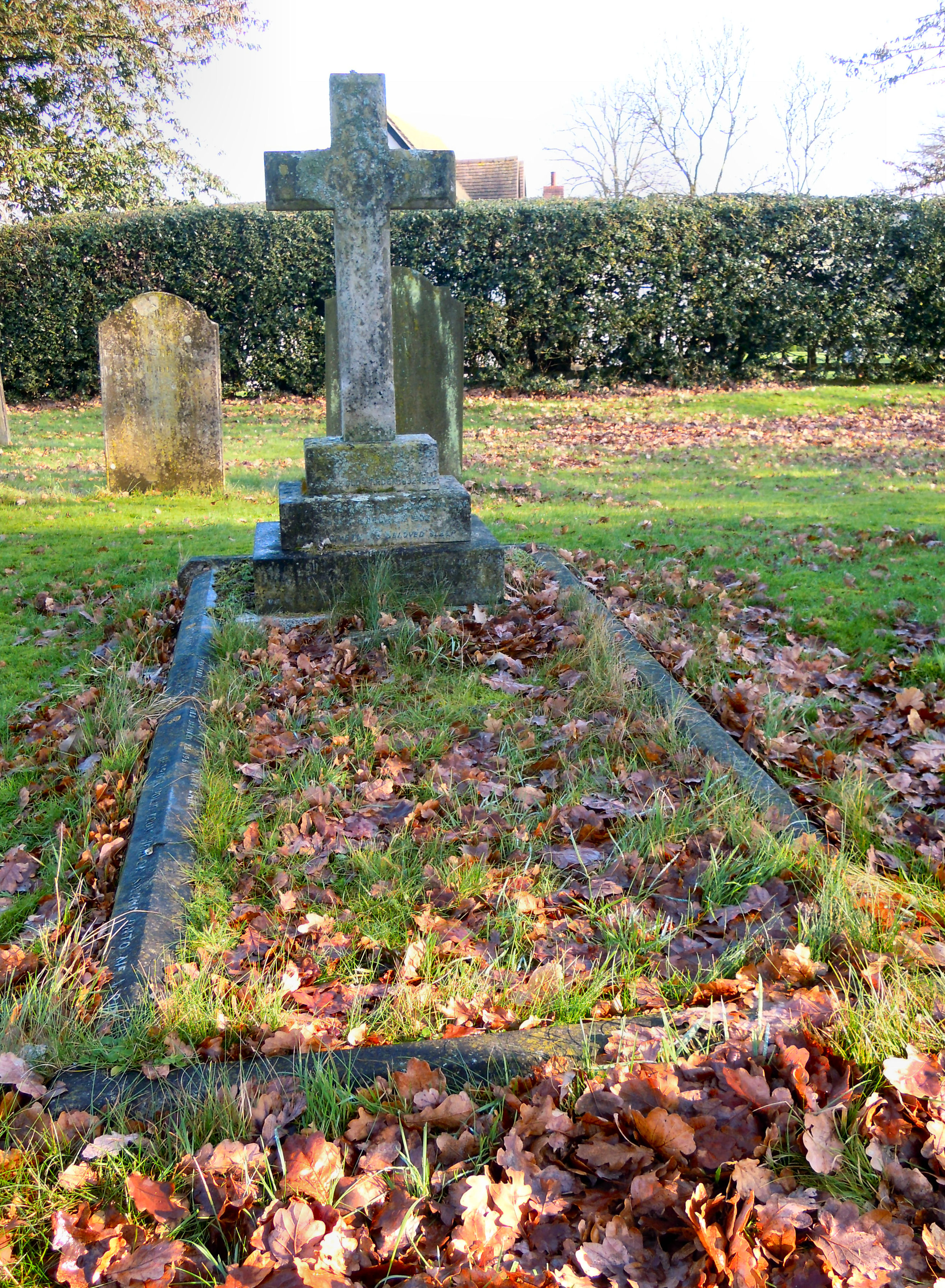
- The grave of Robert Lang in the churchyard of St Leonard's in Old Warden

Personal information
- Full name: Robert Lang
- Born: 6 April 1840; Jessore, India
- Died: 23 March 1908 (aged 67); Woodham Walter, Essex
- Bowling: Fast-medium
- Relatives: George Lang (brother)

Domestic team information
- Years: Team
- 1860–1862: Cambridge University

Career statistics
Competition	FC
Matches	11
Runs scored	180
Batting average	12.00
100s/50s	0/1
Top score	63
Balls bowled	1097
Wickets	28
Bowling average	16.56
5 wickets in innings	2
10 wickets in match	–
Best bowling	5/4
Catches/stumpings	5/–
- Source: Cricket Archive, 4 November 2013

Robert Lang (born 6 April 1840 at Jessore, India; died 23 March 1908 at Woodham Walter, Essex) was an English amateur cricketer who played from 1860 to 1862 for Cambridge University.

Lang was educated at Harrow, where he captained the cricket team in 1858 and 1859, and at Trinity College, Cambridge. He made 11 appearances: eight for Cambridge and three for the Gentlemen in the Gentlemen v Players series.

By the standards of the day he was a "tremendously fast" bowler. In the 1860 match against Oxford University he took 1 for 9 and 5 for 10 to help Cambridge to victory, and in the 1862 match he took 5 for 4 and 4 for 31 in another victory.

Lang became a clergyman in the Church of England. He was clerical secretary of the Church Missionary Society from 1881 to 1892, and Vicar of St Leonard's church in Old Warden in Bedfordshire 1892–1902, Vicar of Dinton in Buckinghamshire from 1903 to 1906, and Rector at Woodham Walter in Essex from 1907 to 1908.

He is buried in the churchyard of St Leonard's church in Old Warden in Bedfordshire, close to his daughter and grandson, Richard Ormonde Shuttleworth. His brother, George, also played.
