= Mansion House, Old Warden Park =

Listed building in Bedfordshire, England

Coordinates: 52.0845°N 0.3284°W

The House at Shuttleworth
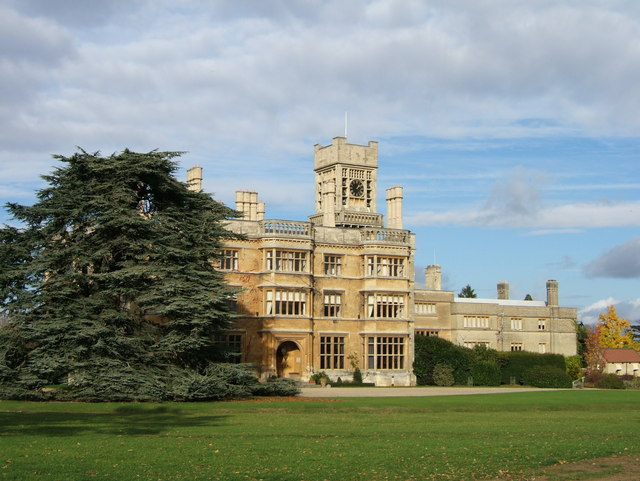
- The House at Shuttleworth, Old Warden Park

- Location within Bedfordshire

General information
- Architectural style: Jacobean style
- Location: Old Warden, Bedfordshire, England
- Opened: 1876

Design and construction
- Architect: Henry Clutton

Website
- www.shuttleworth.org/shuttleworth-house/

Listed Building – Grade II*
- Official name: Old Warden Park
- Designated: 6 March 1985
- Reference no.: 1222169

The Mansion House, Old Warden Park is a 19th-century country house in Old Warden, Bedfordshire, England. Designed by Henry Clutton for Joseph Shuttleworth, it is a Grade II* listed building.

== History ==
The Old Warden estate was bought in the late 17th century by London merchant Sir Samuel Ongley. It passed down in the Ongley family until 1872, when Robert Henley-Ongley, 3rd Baron Ongley, in financial difficulties, sold it to Joseph Shuttleworth of the Lincoln engineering firm of Clayton & Shuttleworth. It thereafter became better known as the Shuttleworth estate.

The current house was commissioned by Joseph Shuttleworth to replace an existing house on the site, and was intended to rival the 17th-century Shuttleworth mansion at Gawthorpe Hall in Lancashire. It was designed by the prominent Victorian architect, Henry Clutton, in the Jacobean style, built in ashlar stone and was completed in 1876. It is laid out as a three-storey rectangular block. The design involved an asymmetrical main frontage of five bays facing south across the park. The central bay featured a round headed opening with a moulded surround. The first, third and fifth bays were projected forward and were fenestrated by canted bay windows. All windows were mullioned and transomed. There was a four stage clock tower, which was 100 feet (30 m) tall, to the right and behind the main block. At roof level, there was a balustraded parapet and there were tall chimneys.

Clutton designed many of the interior features such as the carved doors, balustrades, and chimneypieces. Gillows of Lancaster made many of the interior furnishings and there are several examples of 19th-century paintings by prominent artists such as Sir Frank Dicksee, William Leader, George Vicat Cole and Frank Holl.

During the Second World War, the house was a Red Cross convalescent home and auxiliary hospital for airmen. It then opened as an agricultural college, appropriately known as Shuttleworth College, in 1946.

In November 2012, the Heritage Lottery Fund awarded a grant of £2.8 million to restore structures in the grounds including a Swiss Garden which was created by Robert Henley-Ongley, 3rd Baron Ongley, in the early 19th century, to exhibit Alpine scenery.

== Today ==
The house is a venue for weddings, corporate events, product launches, conferences, afternoon tea, and as a filming location for period dramas. It is open to the public on selected event dates, including six Sunday airshows and Flying Proms. The house is managed by The Shuttleworth Trust, established in 1944 by Dorothy Clotilda Shuttleworth in memory of her son Richard Ormonde Shuttleworth (1909–1940).

== See also ==
- Grade II* listed buildings in Bedfordshire
