= Admiral Halsey =

Admiral Halsey may refer to:

- U.S. Fleet Admiral William Halsey Jr., (1882–1959)
  - The Paul McCartney song "Uncle Albert/Admiral Halsey"
- British Admiral Lionel Halsey, (1872–1949)
