= Ralph Endersby Harwood =

Sir Ralph Endersby Harwood KCB KCVO CBE
- Born: 28 March 1883
- Died: 28 February 1951 (aged 67)
- Education: Bedford Modern School
- Known for: Financial Secretary to George V, Edward VIII and George VI

Sir Ralph Endersby Harwood KCB KCVO CBE (28 March 1883 – 28 February 1951) was Financial Secretary to George V, Edward VIII and George VI.

== Early life ==
Harwood was born on 28 March 1883, the son of Charles Harwood of Shefford, Bedfordshire. He was educated at Bedford Modern School.

== Career ==
Harwood served as Deputy Treasurer to George V from 1922 until 1935 and Financial Secretary to George V (1935), Edward VIII (1936) and George VI (1937). He later became a Governor of the London School of Economics.

He was appointed a Companion of the Order of the Bath (CB) in the 1924 Birthday Honours.

== Family life ==
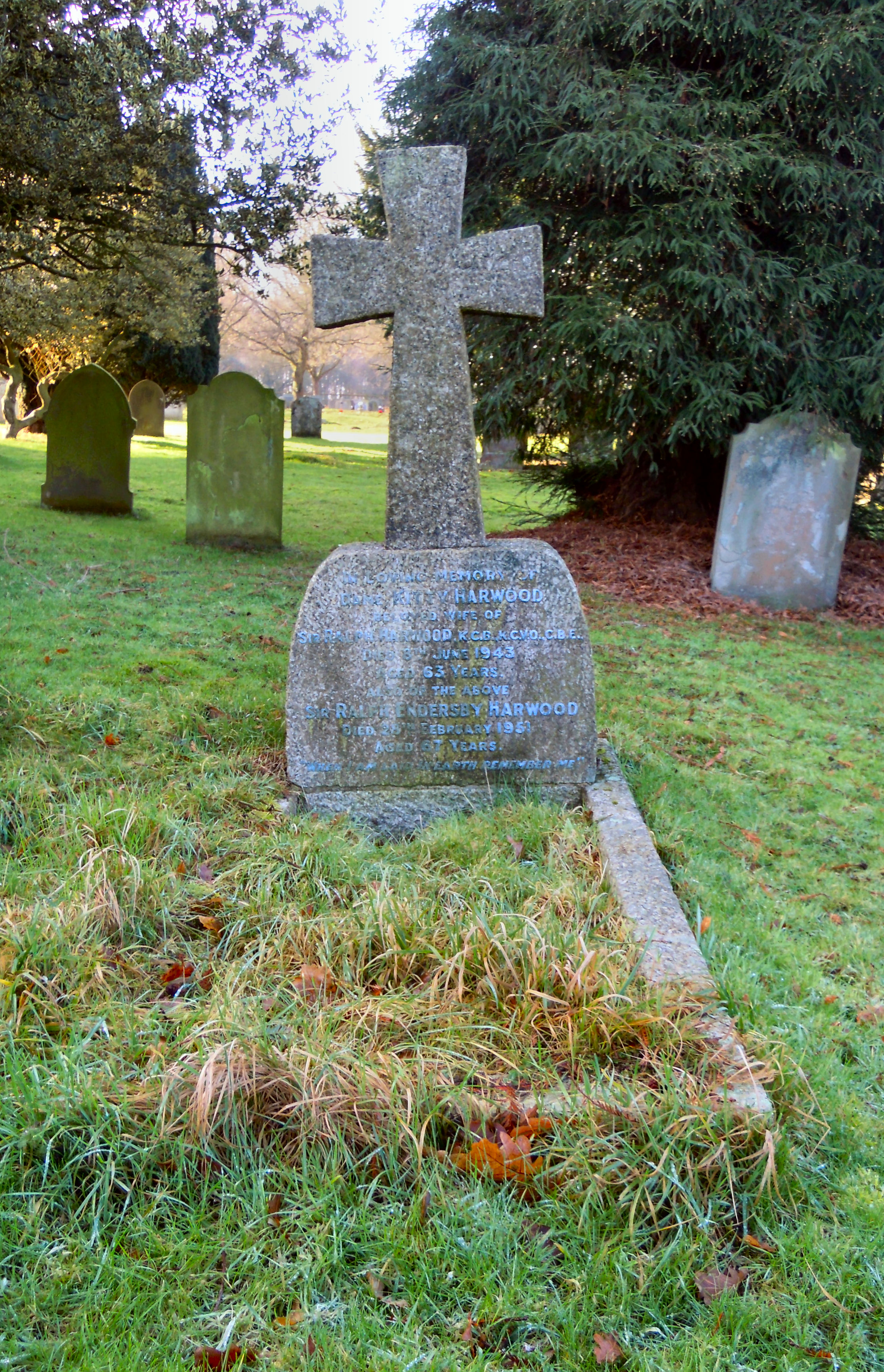
Harwood's grave in the churchyard of St Leonard's church in Old Warden

In 1903, Harwood married Kitty, the daughter of William Rule Endersby. They had one son and three daughters. Sir Ralph was instrumental in the restoration of Seckford Hall, a Suffolk mansion.

Harwood died on 28 February 1951 and is buried in the churchyard of St Leonard's church in Old Warden in Bedfordshire.

There is a photographic portrait of him at the National Portrait Gallery.
