= Richard Ormonde Shuttleworth =

British racing driver (1909–1940)

Richard Shuttleworth
- Richard Ormonde Shuttleworth
- Born: 16 July 1909; Old Warden, Bedfordshire, England
- Died: 2 August 1940 (aged 31); Ewelme, Oxfordshire, England
- Occupations: Aviator; Racing driver

Richard Ormonde Shuttleworth (16 July 1909 – 2 August 1940) was a racing motorist, aviator and prolific collector of veteran cars and aircraft. His collection forms the nucleus of the Shuttleworth Collection. He was killed in an air crash on a night RAF training exercise in 1940.

== Life ==
=== Family ===
Richard Shuttleworth was the only son of Colonel Frank Shuttleworth (1845–1913) and Dorothy Clotilda (née Lang, 1879–1968), the youngest daughter of the Rev. Robert Lang, the Vicar of Old Warden; they had married in 1902. Richard Shuttleworth was the grandson of Joseph Shuttleworth (1819–1883), co-founder of Clayton & Shuttleworth.

After her husband's death Dorothy Clotilda Shuttleworth remarried in 1914, her second husband being Brigadier-General William McLaren Campbell (1864–1924) and she had a daughter by him, Anne Elspeth Campbell (1917-1986). Anne Campbell married H.S.H. Alexander Georg Maria Ignatius von Croy (1912—2002) in 1938 (they divorced in 1968) and they had three children.

=== Early life ===
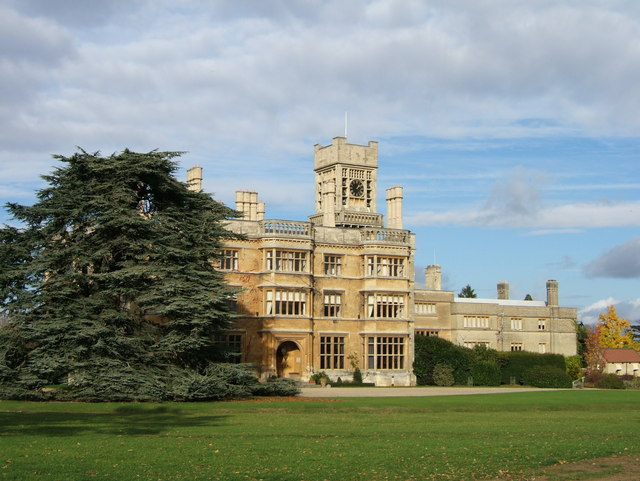
Shuttleworth was born at the Mansion House, Old Warden Park, now part of Shuttleworth College

Richard Shuttleworth was born at Old Warden Park in 1909; his father Frank Shuttleworth died when Richard was just four years old, and his mother Dorothy Shuttleworth brought him up to be ready to take over his inheritance, which he did in 1932 when he was 23. He was fascinated from an early age with any mechanical object, and this interest led to the nucleus of the present Shuttleworth Collection, housed on his former estate. His interest in the family estate led to his being elected President of the Bedfordshire Agricultural Society in 1935.

He was educated at Eton College, where he was "just" accepted in 1922. He did not excel academically, except in Eton's School of Mechanics, and on leaving the college he attained the necessary qualifications through a "crammer" to join the Army. After passing out at Sandhurst he joined the 16th/5th The Queen's Royal Lancers. A keen and accomplished horseman, between 1927 and 1932 he rode in the Oakley Club's Hunt, various point-to-points, hurdles, steeplechases and in 1931 won the Subalterns Cup. On attaining his inheritance in 1932 he left the Army hoping to join the Royal Air Force, but was considered to be too old.

=== Motor vehicles ===
By this time he had already begun to collect and restore vintage cars. Richard Shuttleworth first took part in a London to Brighton Veteran Car Run in 1928. He often entered more than one car for this event. He participated 1928 to 1938; except for 1935 where: "R. O. Shuttleworth failed to send in his entry before the closing date, but joined up with the others at Westminster Bridge with a Benz. His companion at the wheel was Charles Martin, and their hairy goat-skin coats, which dated from the same period as the car, were much admired."

He won the Brighton Speed Trials on a Bugatti Type 51 in 1934, and again in 1935 on an Alfa-Romeo P3 Tipo B, breaking Sir Malcolm Campbell's course record. He also won a one-off hill climb at Joel Park, Northwood Hill, Middlesex, on 22 June 1935, on a Bugatti, in a time of 30.16 seconds. His greatest victory came in the Donington Grand Prix in 1935. He won the Mountain Championship at Brooklands later that year. In 1936 he had a bad crash in his Alfa Romeo at the South African Grand Prix. The injuries suffered caused him to retire from motor racing.

He was chairman of Railton Cars, Ltd and a member of the British Racing Drivers' Club (BRDC).

=== Aircraft ===
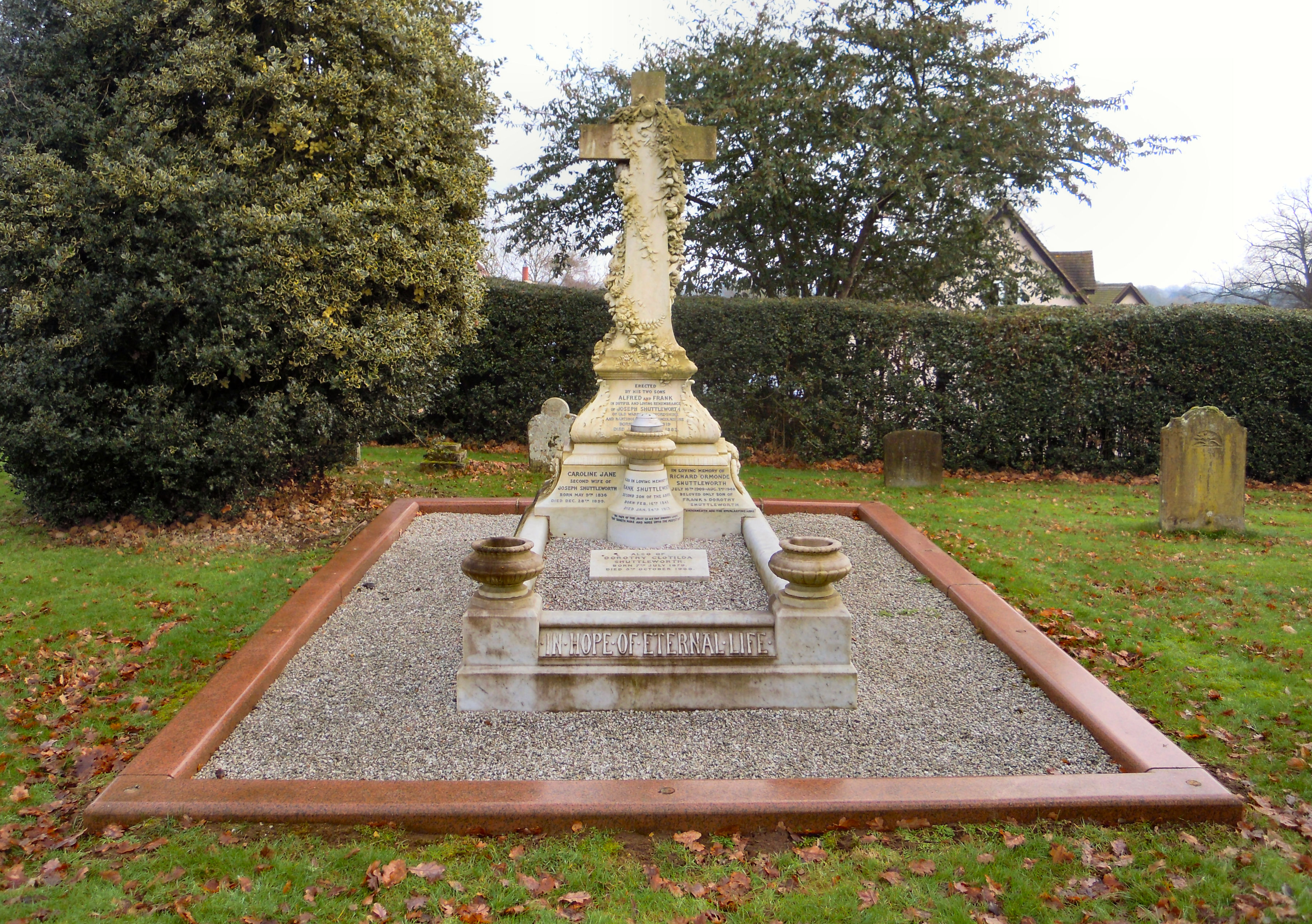
Shuttleworth is buried in the Shuttleworth Family vault at the church of St Leonard in Old Warden

Shuttleworth became interested in aviation and earned his pilot's licence. He collected old aircraft, repaired them for flight at workshops at Old Warden, Bedfordshire and flew them at air displays. He acquired a wrecked Blériot XI and a Deperdussin 1910 monoplane from a local businessman and restored them; the Blériot is now the world's oldest flying powered aircraft.

When the Second World War broke out Shuttleworth joined the Royal Air Force Volunteer Reserve (RAFVR). He reached the rank of pilot officer and was selected to join the Aircraft Crash Investigation Branch once he had completed his RAF flying training, and to achieve this in August 1940 he was training with No. 12 Operational Training Unit RAF at RAF Mount Farm, a Relief Landing Ground for RAF Benson in Oxfordshire. In the early hours of 2 August 1940 he took off in a Fairey Battle light bomber for a cross-country training exercise, but it crashed into a hill at nearby Ewelme and he was killed.

Richard Shuttleworth is buried in the Shuttleworth family plot at the church of St Leonard in Old Warden.

== See also ==
- Shuttleworth College (Bedfordshire)
- Church of St Leonard, Old Warden
