= Samuel Ongley (died 1726) =

English politician

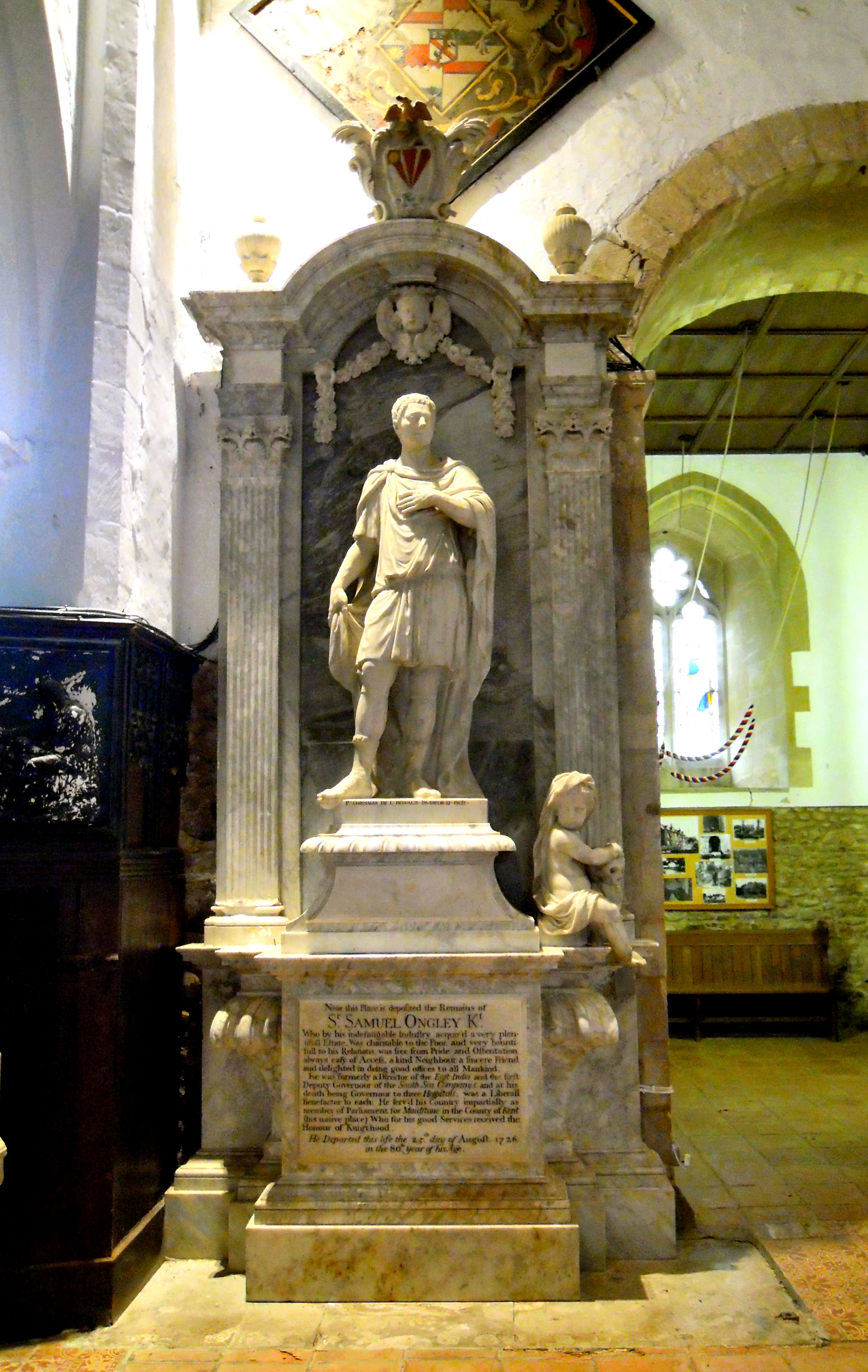
Sir Samuel Ongley's monument in St Leonard's church in Old Warden, where he is buried

Sir Samuel Ongley (1647–1726), of Old Warden, Bedfordshire and Mincing Lane, London, was an English politician.

Born in Maidstone, Kent, he became a London merchant. In 1698 he purchased the Old Warden Estate from Paulet St John, Earl of Bolingbroke. He was appointed High Sheriff of Bedfordshire for 1703.

He was a member (MP) of the parliament of Great Britain for Maidstone 1713 to 1715 and was knighted in 1713.

He died unmarried in 1726, leaving his estate to his nephew, also Samuel Ongley, who became MP for Bedford.

He is buried in St Leonard's church in Old Warden in Bedfordshire.

Honorary titles
Preceded by Thomas Johnson	High Sheriff of Bedfordshire; 1703–1704	Succeeded by Edward Duncombe
