= Church of St Leonard, Old Warden =

Church in Bedfordshire, England

Coordinates: 52.0856°N 0.3424°W

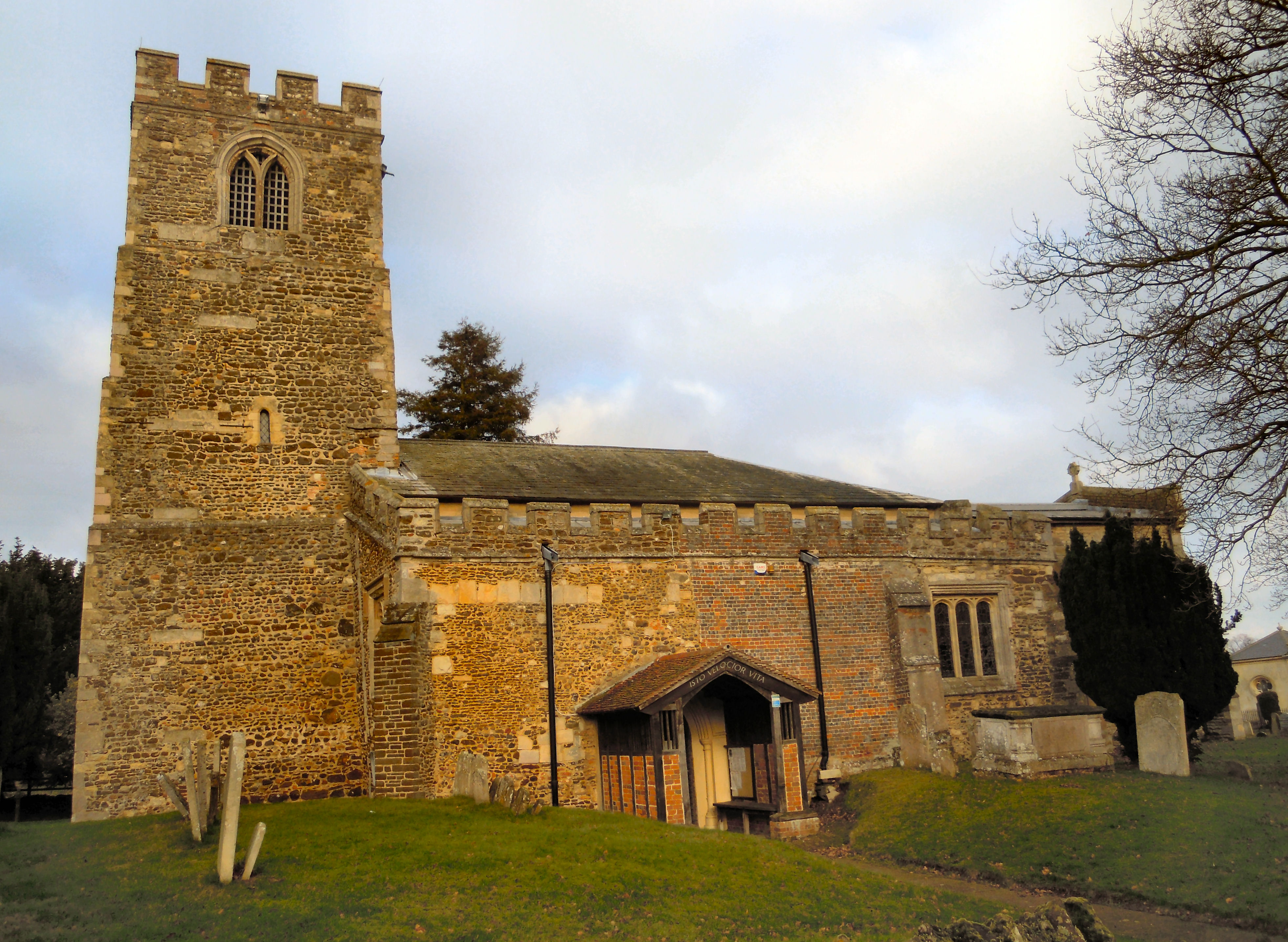
The Abbey Church of St Leonard of Old Warden

The Abbey Church of St Leonard of Old Warden is a Grade I listed church in Old Warden, Bedfordshire, England. It became a listed building on 31 October 1966.

== Design ==
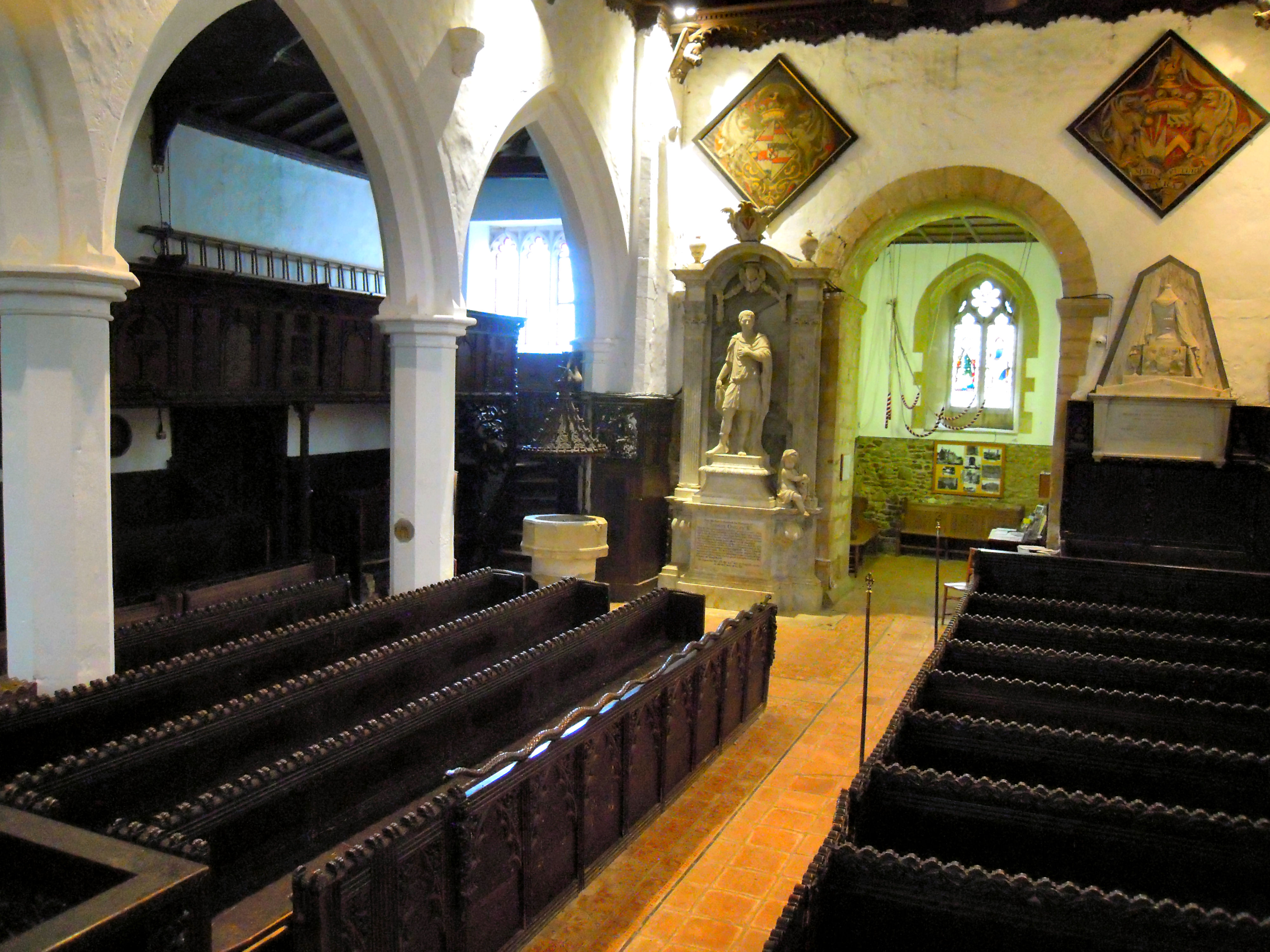
The nave in St Leonards

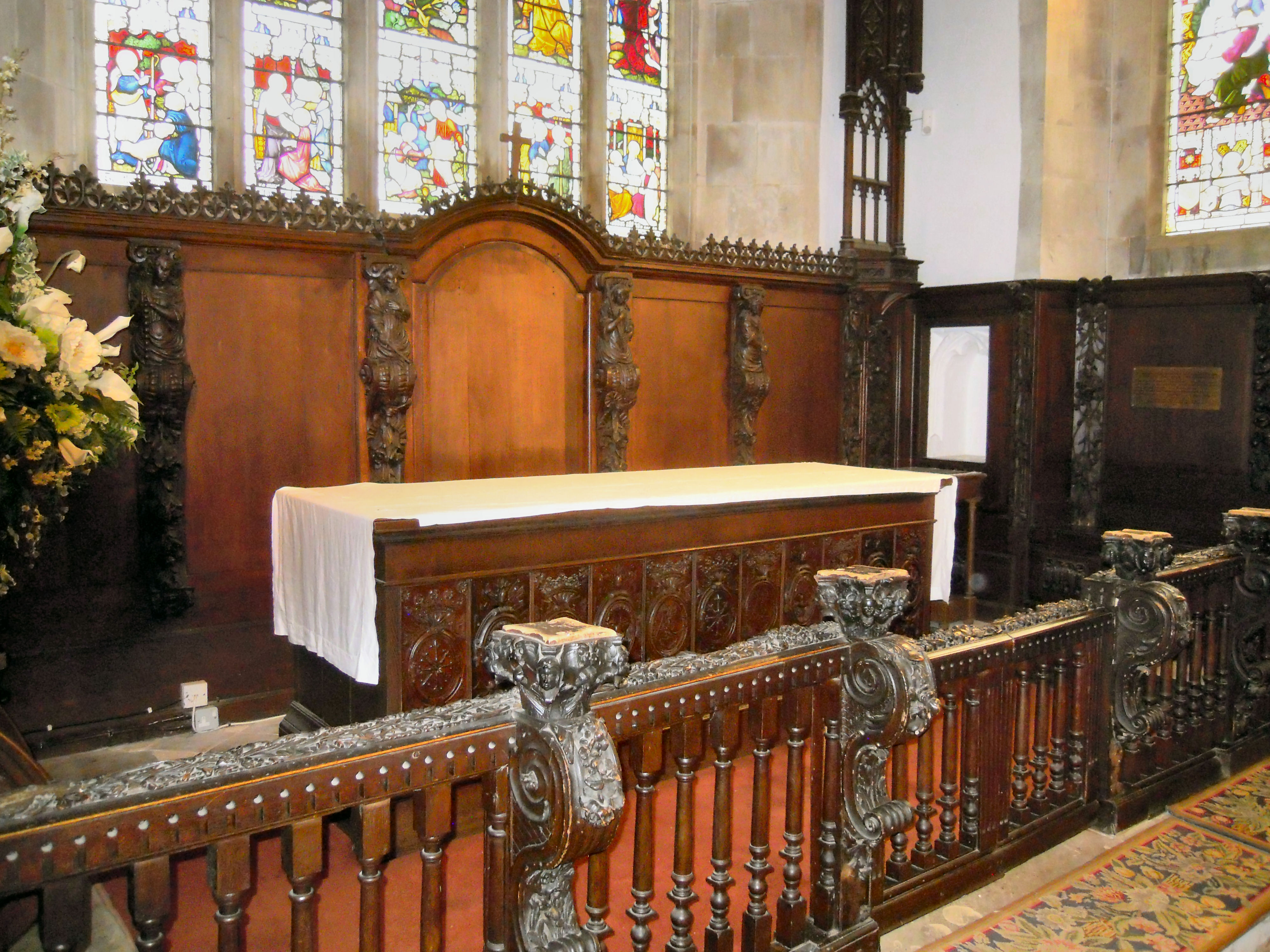
The Sanctuary in St Leonards

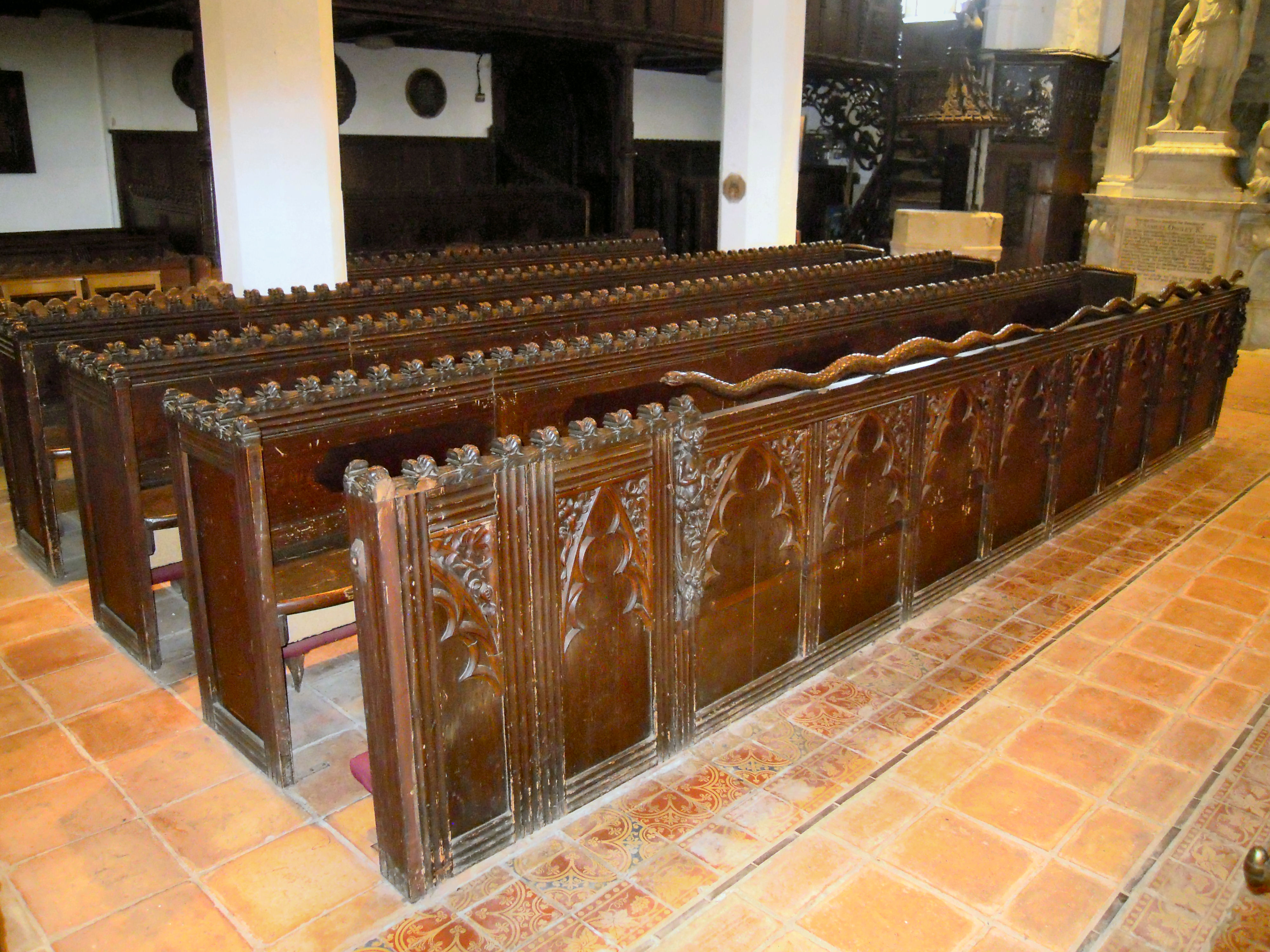
The restored snake pews

St Leonard's is named for Leonard of Noblac and dates to the early 12th century but the present structure is predominantly 13th century, with 14th, 15th and 16th century additions. The base of the tower, including the tower arch, is 12th century Norman, with the remainder rebuilt in the 15th century. The church was considerably reworked in the mid and late 19th century when the elaborate wooden interior was added. The church is built mainly of brown cobblestones with limestone dressings, with some later working in red brick and in coursed limestone. The south porch was built in 1952 to a design by Professor Richardson and is timber framed with red brick infill and a gabled tiled roof. It was added in 1952 by Mrs Dorothy Shuttleworth in memory of her son, Richard Ormonde Shuttleworth (1909-1940).

Today the church is best known for the richly ornate wooden carvings with which it was "beautified" by the Rt. Hon. Robert Henley-Ongley, 3rd Baron Ongley of Old Warden in the mid 19th century. From widely differing periods and mostly from Belgium, France and Italy, the carvings are said to include a number of panels removed from the private chapel of Anne of Cleves; these can be identified by the initials AC surmounted by a crown. A number of wooden panels including 15 showing Biblical scenes were stolen from the church in 1997 and were never recovered. It is intended to replace them with contemporary carvings of a similar nature.

A noted feature of the church is the medieval stained glass of the 14th century in the north wall which was originally in nearby Wardon Abbey and which shows the figure of St Margaret on the right holding a rope while on the left is a figure of an Abbot of Wardon Abbey in the white habit of a Cistercian. Further along the north wall in the chancel is a marble tablet by Goscombe John dedicated in memory of Frank Shuttleworth (1845-1913) by his widow, Mrs Dorothy Shuttleworth. Some of the inscription was erased later to record that their only son Pilot Officer Richard Ormonde Shuttleworth RAFVR was killed in a flying accident during World War II while serving in the RAF. The lectern bears the eagle and motto of the Royal Air Force and was given by Mrs Shuttleworth again in memory of her son.

The carved wooden pulpit shows Jesus with children and the Woman of Samaria and is probably 18th century Flemish. It was purchased by Frank Shuttleworth from an antique shop in Edinburgh. Originally it had carvings of the signs of the Four Evangelists on the four pilasters but these were stolen in 1997. The wooden panels on the front of the altar are late 19th century. The serpents on the front pew are of particular note. One was damaged during the burglary of 1997 and was repaired by local craftsmen while the second was stolen and subsequently replaced. The large box pew at the top of the nave opposite the pulpit was the Shuttleworth Family pew and contains a fine carving of the Women preparing the body of Christ. Above this is a large and ornate baroque carving representing Faith, erected by her sister in memory of Caroline Jane Shuttleworth, who died in 1899.

At the west end of the nave is a life-size monument by Peter Scheemakers and Laurent Delvaux to Sir Samuel Ongley (1647–1726), a Member of Parliament, Director of the East India Company and the first Deputy Governor of the South Sea Company. Only one putto remains, the other having been stolen in the burglary of 1997. The octagonal wooden tiles set in the two pillars were placed there at the time of the restoration of the church during the reign of Mary I of England of Queen Mary, the daughter of Henry VIII, and whose initial they bear. The gallery along the south wall of the nave was added in 1841 by Lord Ongley. The blank-arched panels are English and are believed to be Elizabethan or Jacobean. The baptismal font is 14th century and is surmounted by a mid-19th century Gothic Revival canopy.

== Richard Shuttleworth Chapel ==
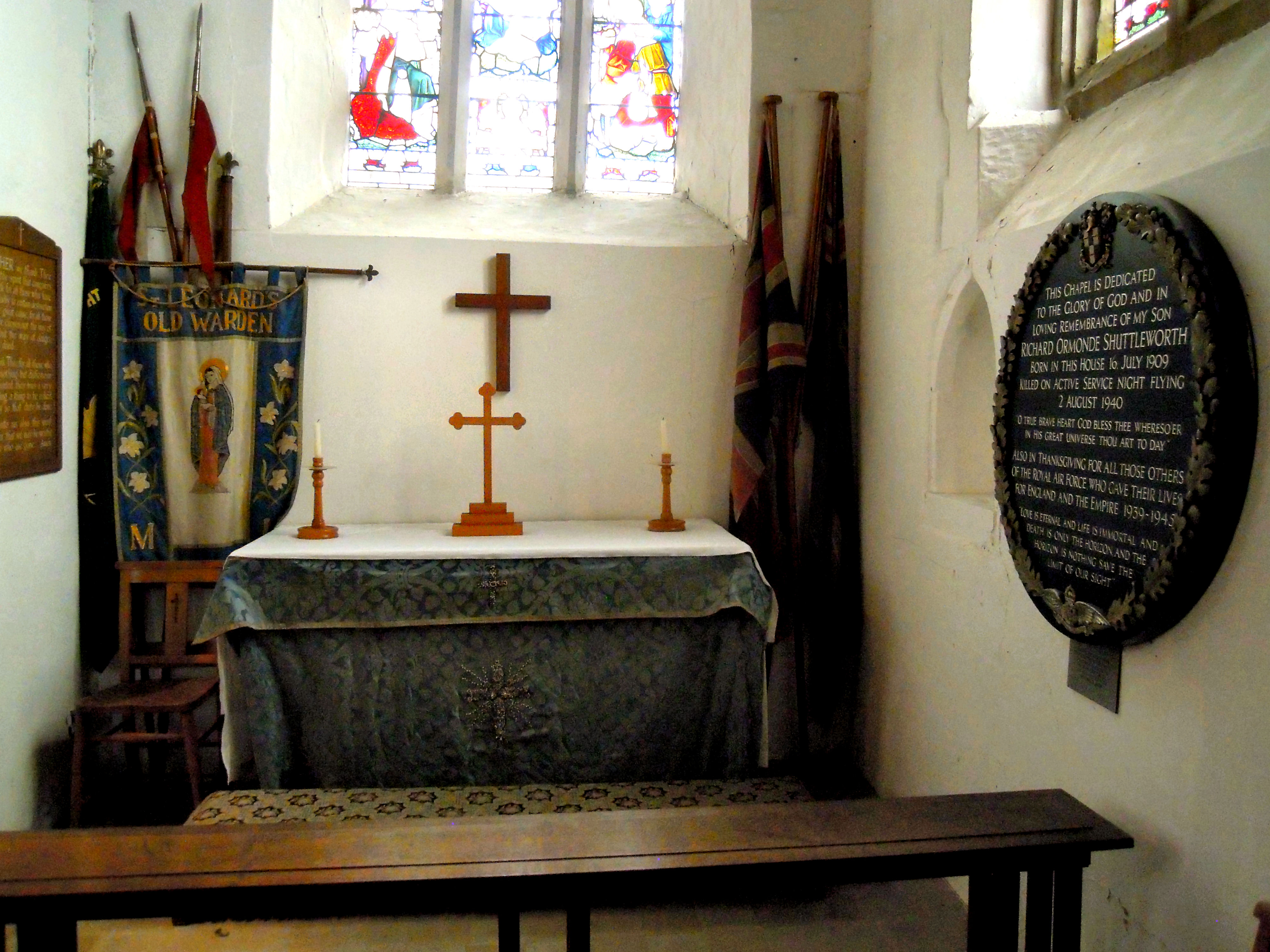
The Richard Shuttleworth Memorial Chapel

In 2008, after changes in the status of the Shuttleworth Chapel in Old Warden Park, St Leonard's church received a number of items from the chapel, including two flags, two lances with regimental pennants, linen and lace altar cloths, a wooden cross and candlesticks. With these items also came the oval plaque with the Shuttleworth family crest and RAF wings dedicated to Richard Ormonde Shuttleworth (1909-1940), who was killed in a flying accident while on active service during World War II and who is buried in the churchyard. This plaque has been placed in the Chapel, in the south nave part of the church.

The window above the altar in the Richard Shuttleworth Chapel was presented by his father Frank Shuttleworth to commemorate the Coronation of Edward VII. The date in the window, however, is wrong as the window was completed before the Coronation which had to be postponed because of the illness of the King.

== The bells ==
The church has six bells with the oldest (No 5) being more than 400 years old. No 3 bell was originally cast in 1653 by the bell-founder Miles Graye but was recast in 1976. The tenor bell was recast in 1840 by Thomas Mears of London. Nos. 1 and 2 bells were cast by Taylor of Loughborough and were added in 1897 by Colonel Frank Shuttleworth to commemorate the Diamond Jubilee of Queen Victoria.

== Notable burials ==
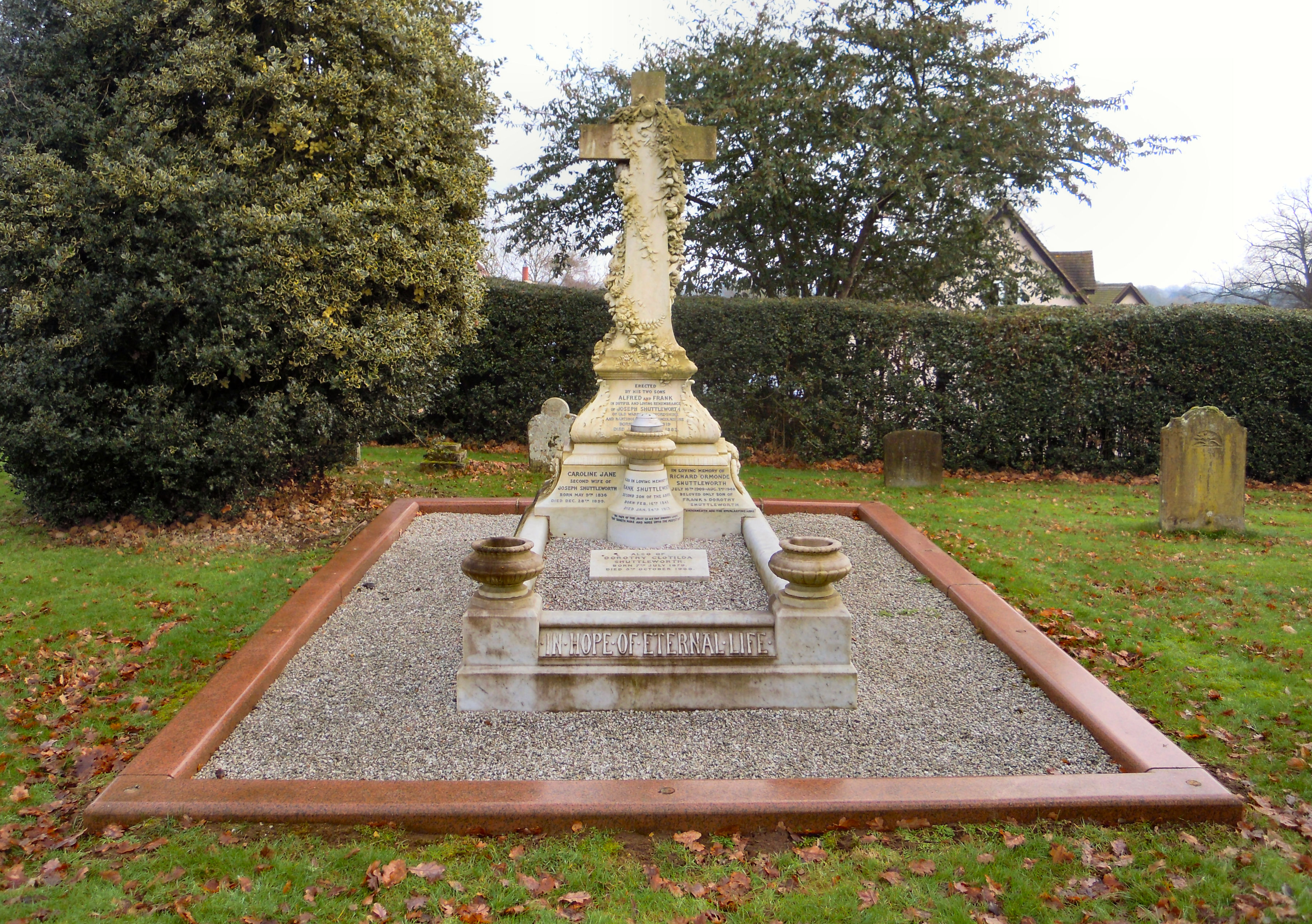
The Shuttleworth Family grave in the churchyard

- Admiral Sir Lionel Halsey (1872–1949), Royal Navy officer and courtier
- Sir Ralph Endersby Harwood (1883–1951), Financial Secretary to George V, Edward VIII and George VI
- Robert 'Bob' Lang (1840-1908), Vicar of St Leonard's 1892-1902 and who played first-class cricket from 1860 to 1862 for Cambridge University.
- Robert Henley-Ongley, 1st Baron Ongley (c.1721–1785), British politician
- Sir Samuel Ongley (1647–1726), English politician
- Richard Ormonde Shuttleworth (1909-1940), racing driver and aviator

In the north-east corner of the churchyard stands the Ongley Family mausoleum, built in 1790 and containing 42 vaults, only 10 of which were used.

== Gallery ==
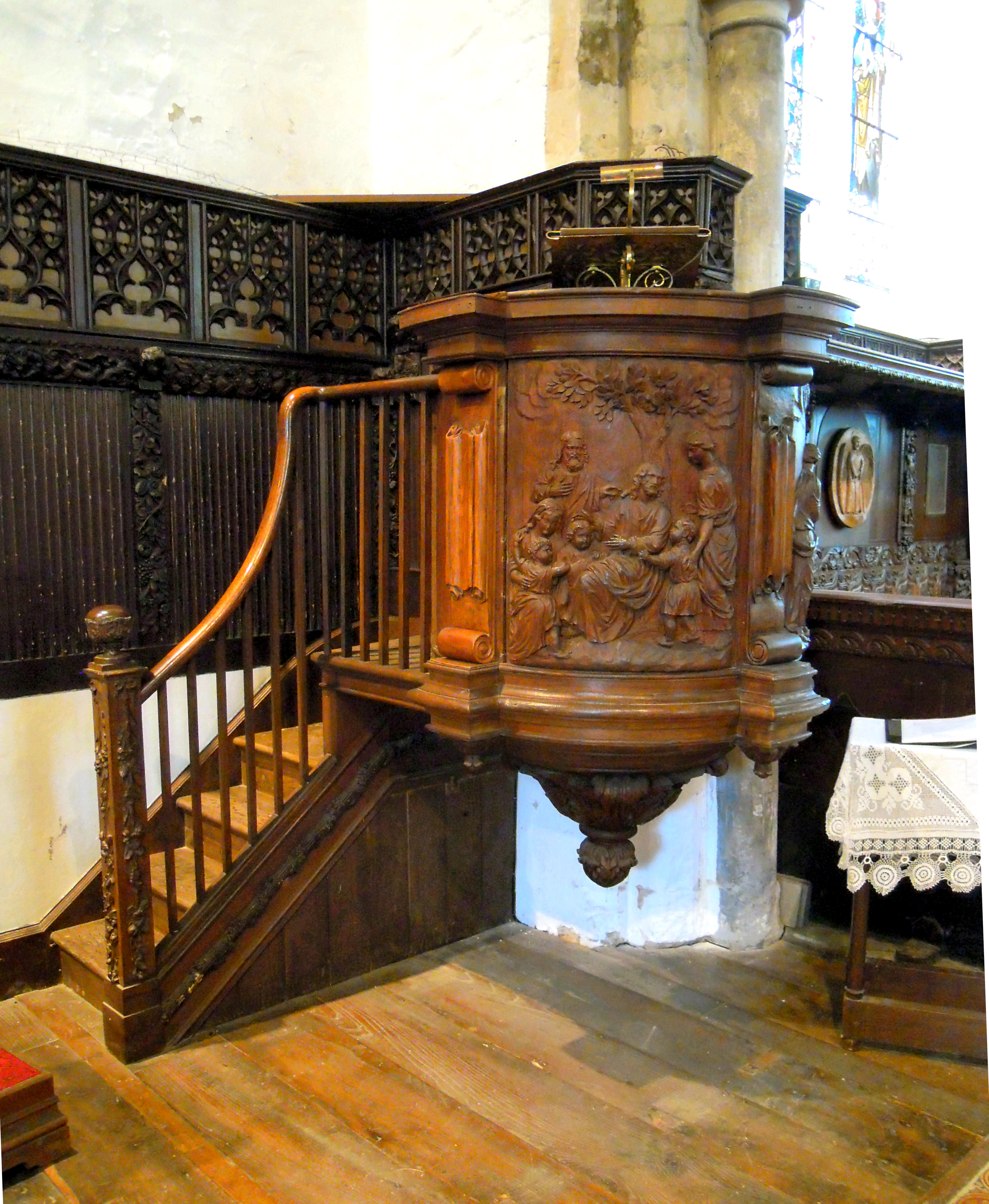
The 18th century Flemish pulpit in St Leonard's church

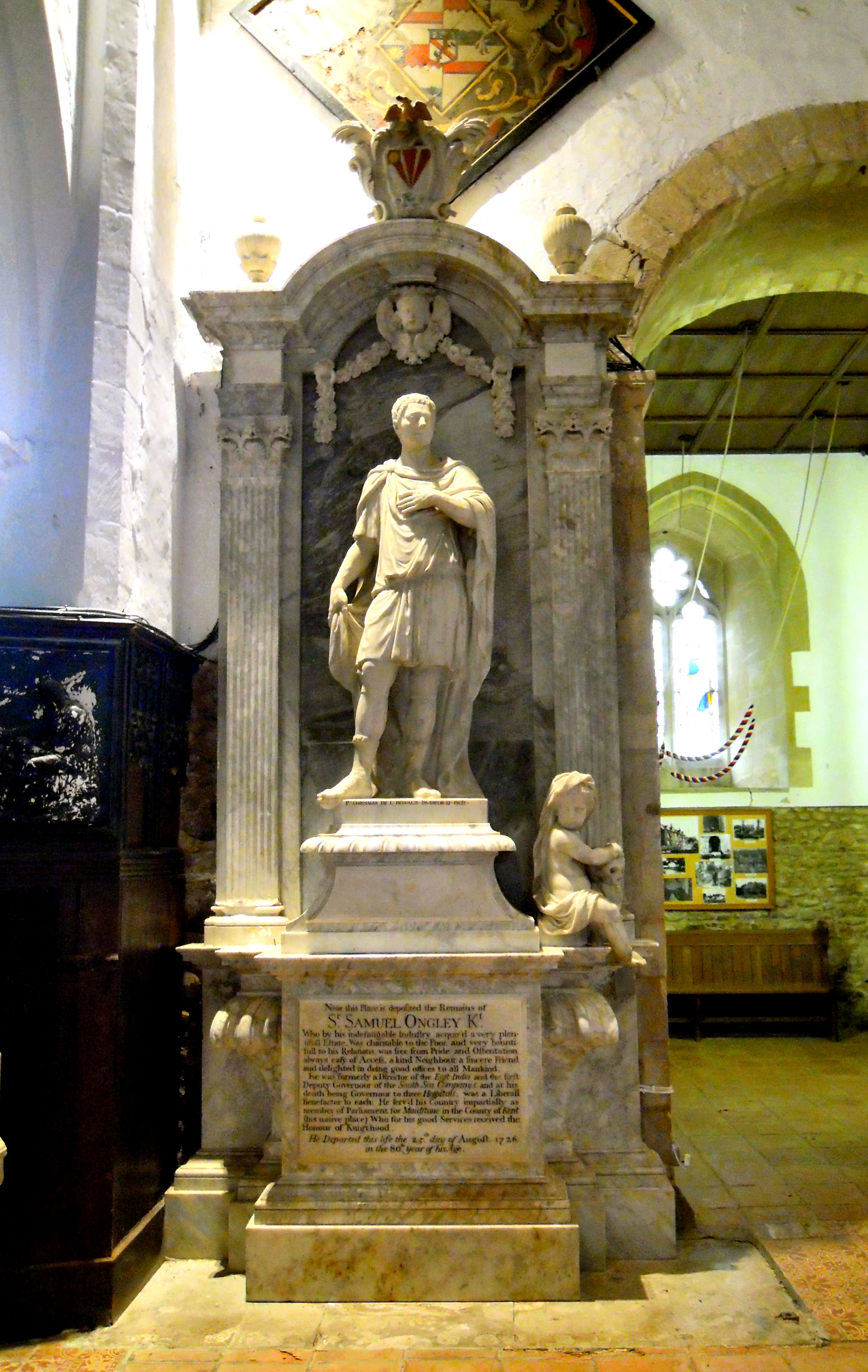
Sir Samuel Ongley's monument in St Leonard's church

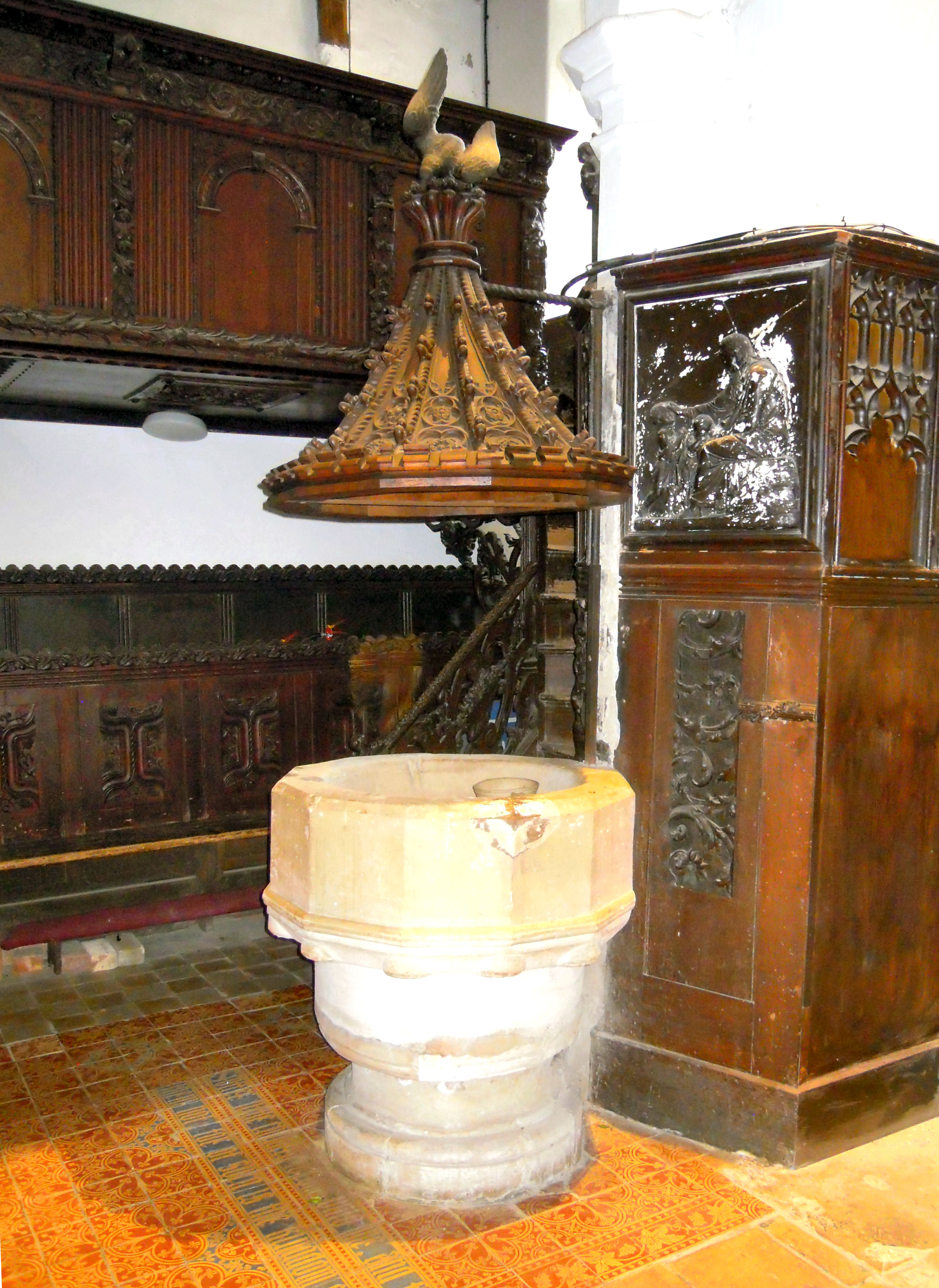
The baptismal font

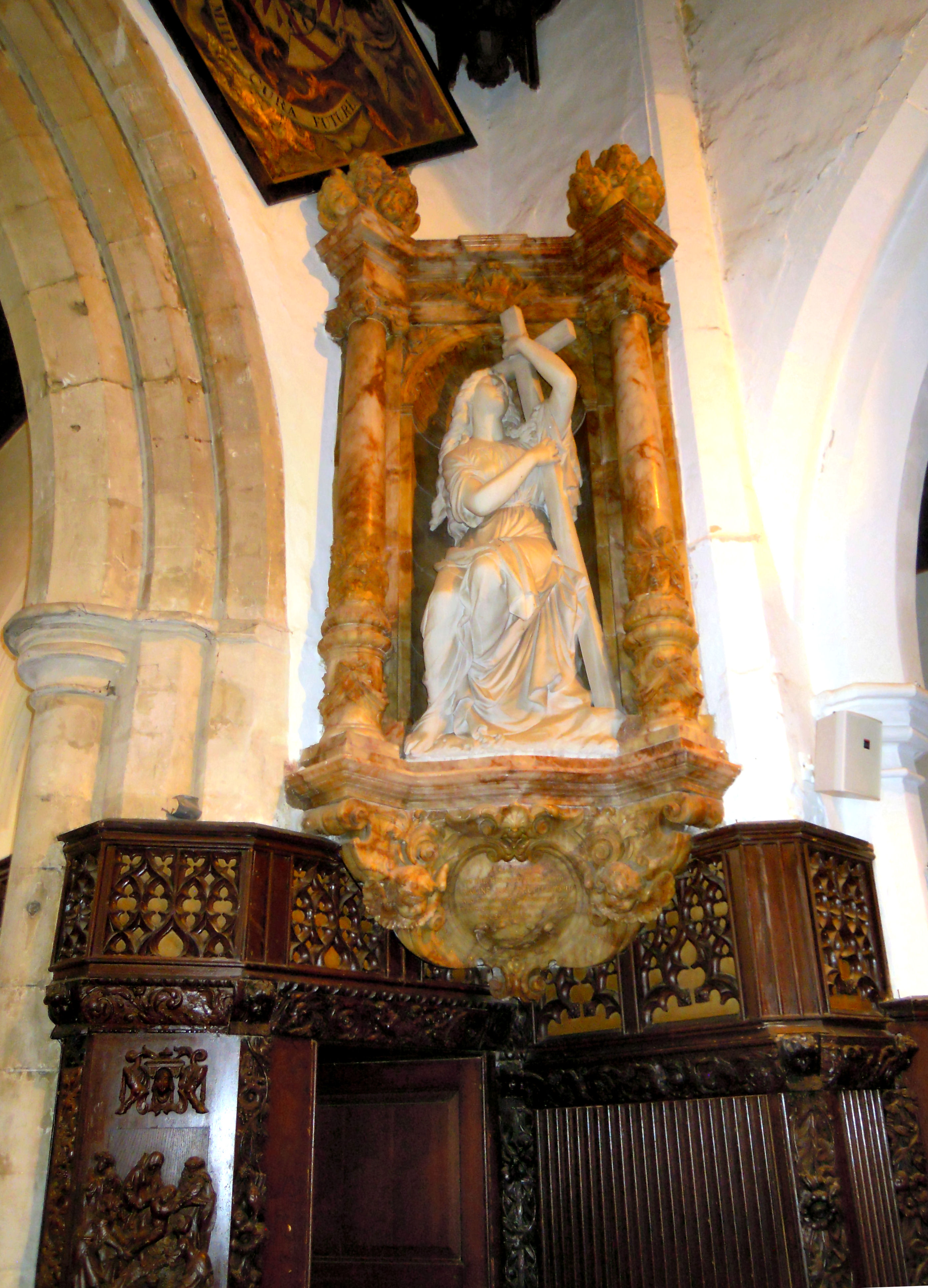
The baroque memorial to Caroline Shuttleworth (died 1899)

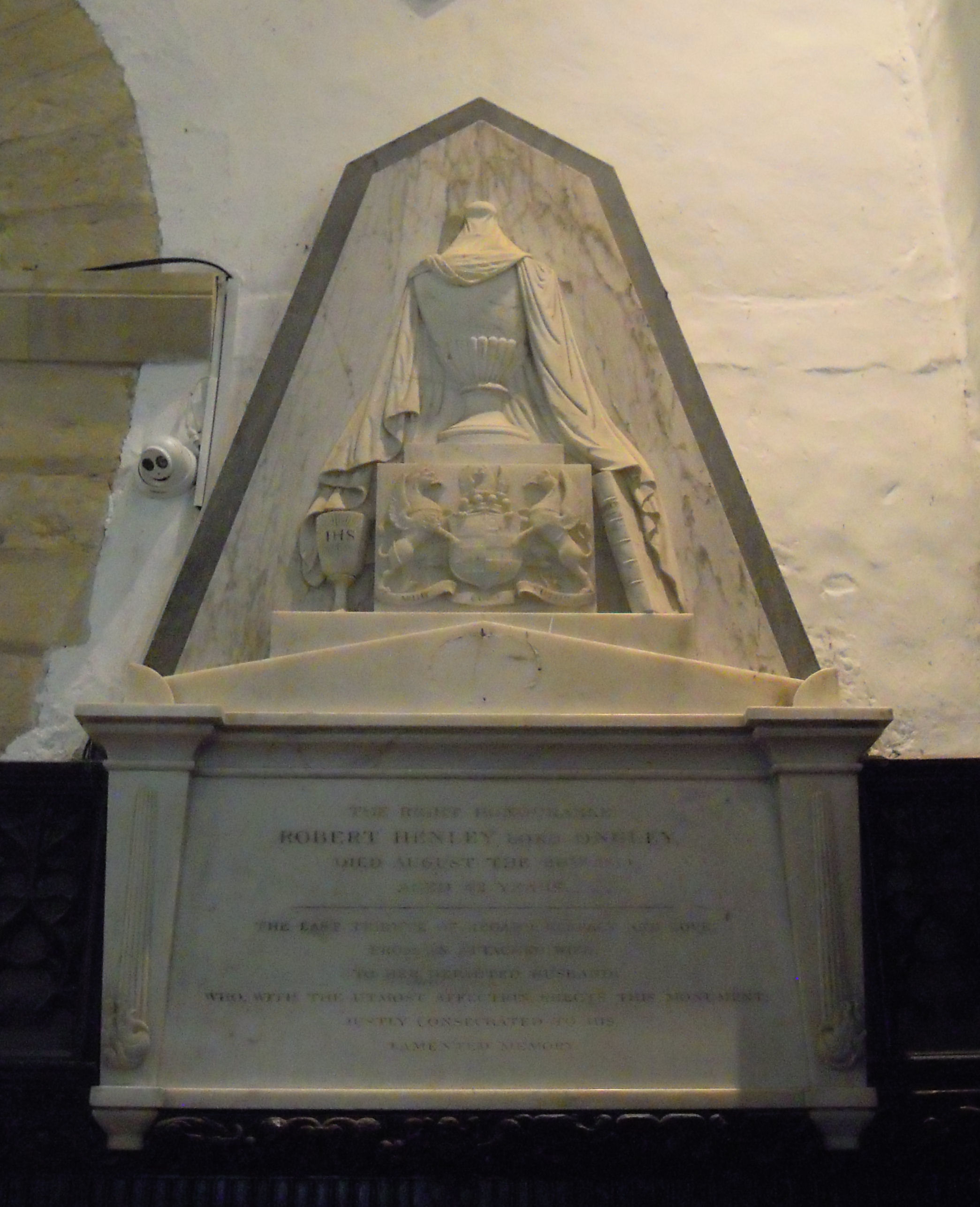
Robert Henley-Ongley's memorial in St Leonard's church

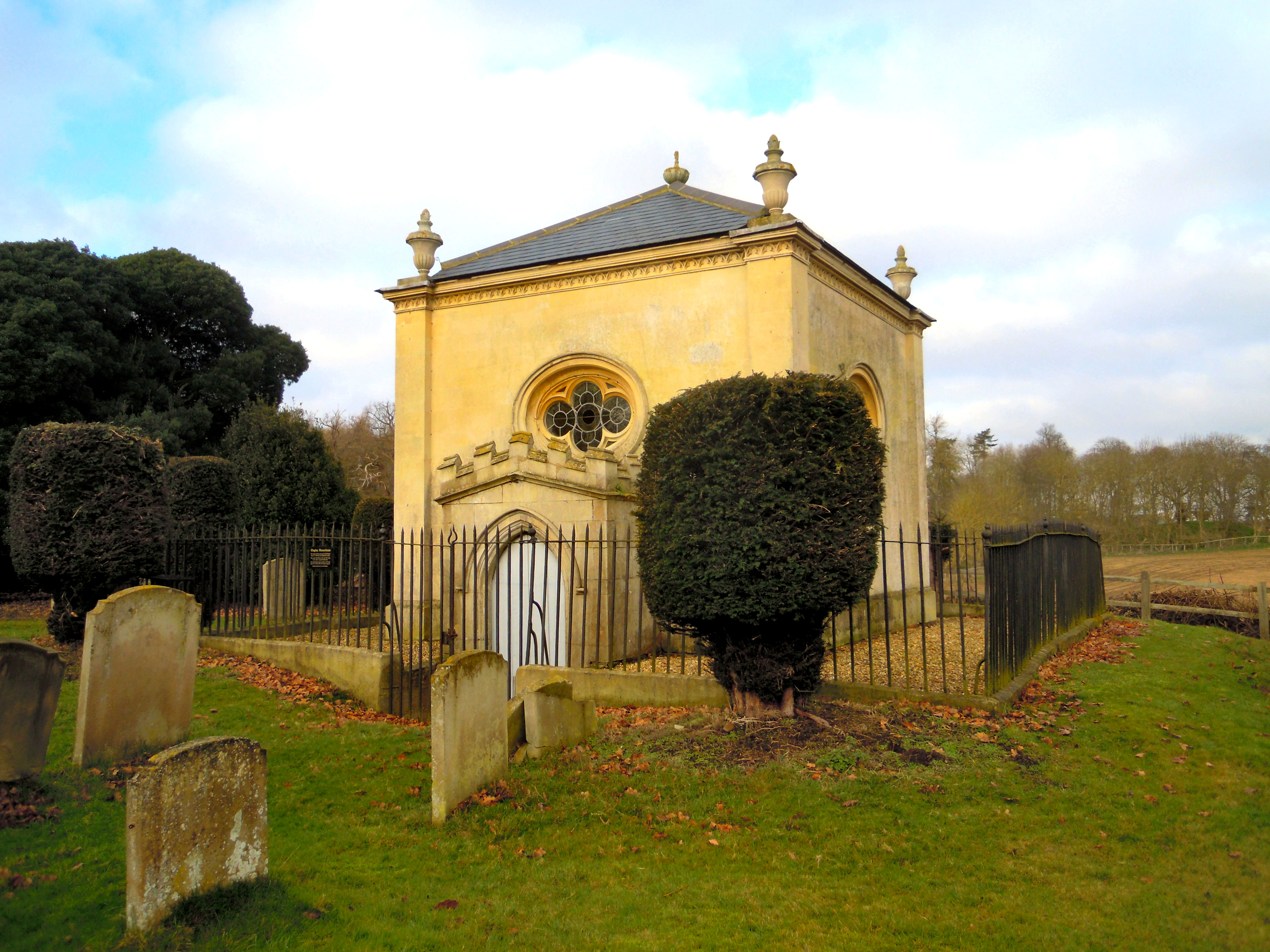
The Ongley Mausoleum in the churchyard of St Leonard's church

== See also ==
- Grade I listed buildings in Bedfordshire
