= Lionel Halsey =

Royal Navy Admiral and courtier (1872–1949)

Admiral Sir Lionel Halsey GCMG GCVO KCIE CB ADC
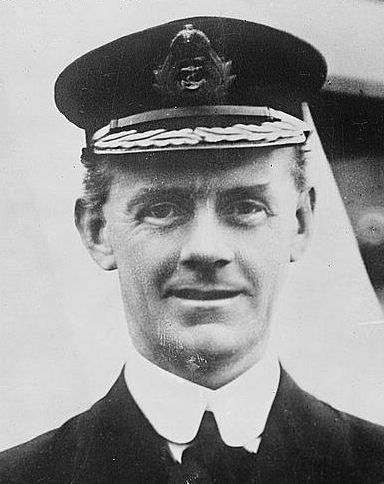
- Born: February 26, 1872; London, England
- Died: 26 October 1949 (aged 77); England
- Military career
- Allegiance: United Kingdom
- Branch: Royal Navy
- Rank: Admiral
- Commands: HM Australian Fleet (1918–19); 2nd Battlecruiser Squadron (1918–19); HMS New Zealand (1912–15); HMS Donegal (1911–12); HMS Powerful (1905–08)
- Conflicts: Second Boer War; First World War: Battle of Heligoland; Battle of Dogger Bank; Battle of Jutland
- Awards: Knight Grand Cross of the Order of St Michael and St George; Knight Grand Cross of the Royal Victorian Order; Knight Commander of the Order of the Indian Empire; Companion of the Order of the Bath; Mentioned in Despatches (3); Officer of the Legion of Honour (France); Order of the Rising Sun, 1st Class (Japan); Navy Distinguished Service Medal (United States)

Admiral Sir Lionel Halsey, GCMG, GCVO, KCIE, CB, ADC (26 February 1872 – 26 October 1949) was a Royal Navy officer and courtier.

== Early life and career ==
Halsey was born in London, the fourth son of Sir Thomas Frederick Halsey, 1st Baronet. After primary education at Stubbington House, Fareham, Hampshire, he entered the Britannia in January 1885. He was commissioned a sub-lieutenant on 14 July 1891. In July 1893, he was posted to the Royal Yacht Victoria and Albert and was promoted lieutenant on 28 August 1893. He served with the Mediterranean Fleet and then on the North America and West Indies Station, before joining HMS Powerful. Ordered home in 1899, Powerful was diverted from the shorter route through the Suez Canal to round the southern tip of Africa in light of rising tensions between the British and the Boers in South Africa. The ship arrived at Simonstown on 13 October, two days after the Second Boer War began. After a request from Lieutenant General George White, commander of the besieged forces at Ladysmith for more long-range artillery, Powerful ferried four guns to Durban, reaching it on 29 November, and a naval brigade from the ship reached Ladysmith on the last two trains to make it through. Halsey was part of the brigade, and commanded a battery of naval guns in the defence of Ladysmith, for which he was mentioned in despatches and later promoted commander on 1 January 1901. After the Relief of Ladysmith at the end of February 1900, the brigade departed the town on 7 March and arrived at Simontown on the 12th. Powerful left Simonstown three days later and arrived at Portsmouth amid large celebrations in April 1900.

He was posted to the cruiser HMS Diana as executive officer and served in her in the Mediterranean until June 1902, when he was posted to the signal school at HMS Victory. From October 1902, he served as Executive Officer and second in command of HMS Good Hope, which was the following month commissioned to convey Joseph Chamberlain, Secretary of State for the Colonies, on his tour of South Africa in late 1902 and early 1903. On their return, the Good Hope was commissioned as flagship of the Cruiser Squadron of the Home Fleet.

In January 1905, Halsey was appointed Naval Member of the new Royal Naval Volunteer Reserve Committee at the Admiralty, and was promoted captain on 30 June 1905. In August 1905, he took command of Powerful, as flag captain to Sir Wilmot Fawkes as Commander-in-Chief Australia Station. In April 1911, he was given command of HMS Donegal in the 4th Cruiser Squadron and in 1912 took over the new battlecruiser HMS New Zealand on her cruise around the world to "show the flag". It was during this cruise that Halsey was given a Māori war skirt which he wore during the naval battles at Heligoland and Dogger Bank. He was appointed a Companion of the Order of St Michael and St George (CMG) on 8 December 1913. On 19 September 1914, he was appointed a Naval Aide-de-camp to the King.

== First World War ==
After the outbreak of the First World War, Halsey commanded the New Zealand at the Battle of Heligoland and the Battle of Dogger Bank in January 1915, for which he was again mentioned in despatches. During the battles Halsey wore the Māori piupiu over his uniform, setting a tradition followed for the duration of the war. In June 1915, he became Captain of the Fleet to Sir John Jellicoe in HMS Iron Duke (1912) with the rank of commodore 1st class. He was granted a special Good Service Pension in July 1915. He was present at the Battle of Jutland, being mentioned in despatches for a third time and appointed a Companion of the Order of the Bath (CB) on 3 June 1916 (in the King's Birthday Honours). On 15 September 1916, he was appointed an Officer of the Légion d'honneur and was promoted to commander in 1917.

On 4 December 1916, Halsey was appointed Fourth Sea Lord at the Admiralty, becoming Third Sea Lord in May 1917. In April 1917, he was promoted rear admiral. In that same year, he was also awarded the Japanese Order of the Rising Sun, Gold and Silver Star, which represents the second highest of eight classes associated with the award. In September 1918, he returned to sea in the battle cruiser HMAS Australia in command of the 2nd Battlecruiser Squadron of the Grand Fleet and was present at the German surrender at Scapa Flow. He was promoted to Knight Commander of the Order of St Michael and St George in 1918 and in 1919 received the Navy Distinguished Service Medal of the United States. He served at the Admiralty from March to August 1919, when he became chief of staff to the Prince of Wales for his tour of Canada, the United States, Australia, New Zealand, the West Indies, and other colonies in HMS Renown. For this he was appointed a Knight Commander of the Royal Victorian Order (KCVO) on 1 December 1919, and advanced to Knight Grand Cross (GCVO) on 11 October 1920.

== Post-war ==
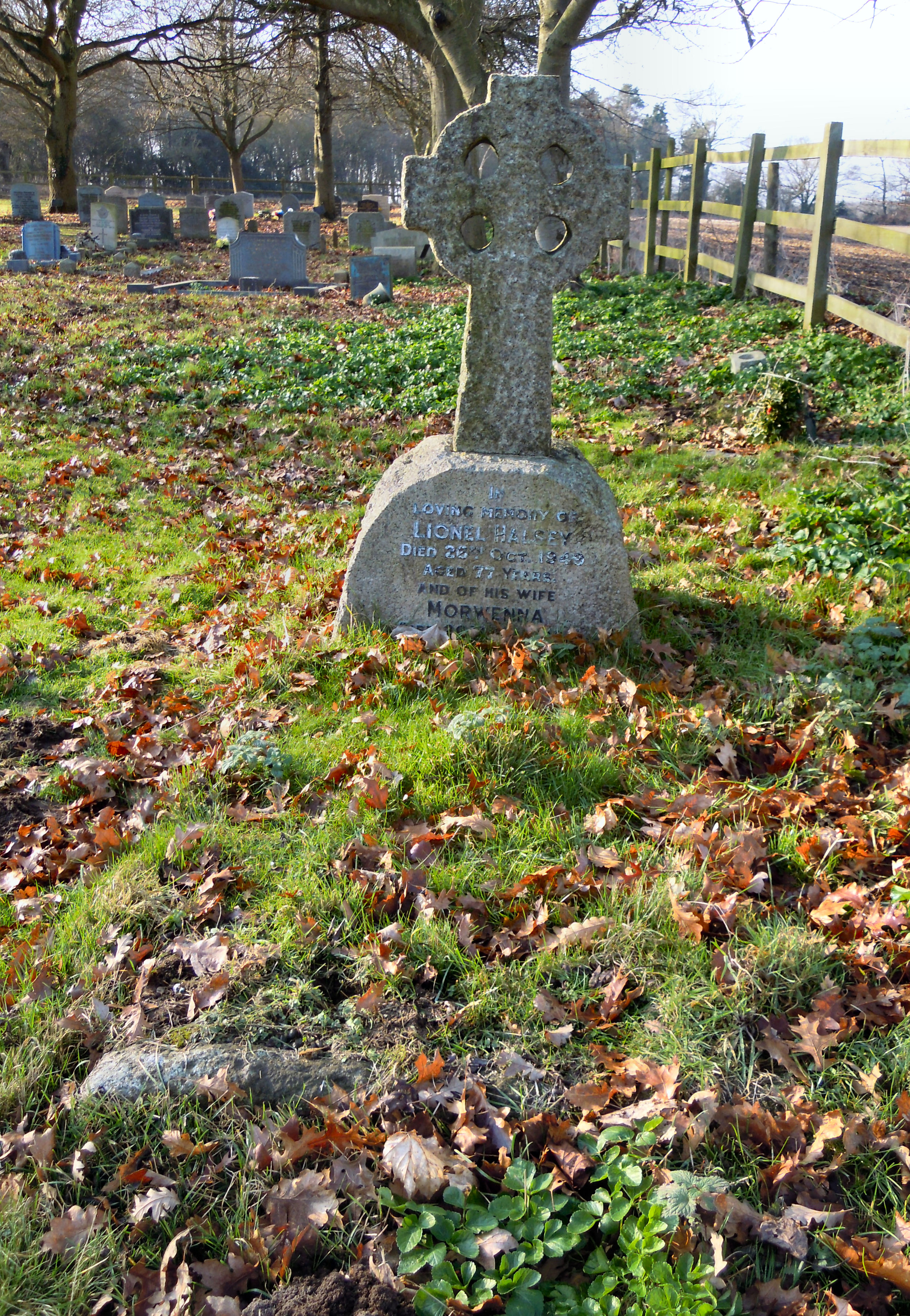
Halsey's grave in the churchyard of St Leonard's church in Old Warden

In November 1920, Halsey was appointed Comptroller and Treasurer to the Prince of Wales. He became a member of the Prince's council in 1920, and an extra equerry in 1921. He was promoted vice admiral on 5 July 1921, and retired from the navy on 1 November 1922. He was appointed a Knight Commander of the Order of the Indian Empire (KCIE) in 1922 after the Prince's visit to India, advanced to Knight Grand Cross of the Order of St Michael and St George (GCMG) on 16 October 1925 following the Prince's visit to Africa and South America, and promoted admiral on 4 October 1926. In 1926, he was appointed a Deputy Lieutenant for the County of Bedford. He was also awarded the Japanese Order of the Rising Sun 1st Class in 1922.

In 1936 he was dismissed from the staff of King Edward VIII, as the Prince of Wales had now become. This was probably due to his opposition to Wallis Simpson becoming queen. In 1937, however, he was appointed an extra equerry to the new King George VI and took part in the coronation procession as acting Keeper of the Jewel House. He died on 26 October 1949, aged 77, and is buried in the churchyard of St Leonard's church in Old Warden in Bedfordshire.

== Footnotes ==
Military offices
| Preceded by Cecil Lambert | Fourth Sea Lord; 1916–1917 | Succeeded by Hugh Tothill |
| Preceded by Frederick Tudor | Third Sea Lord and Chief of Naval Materiel; 1917–1918 | Succeeded by Charles de Bartolomé |
| Preceded by Arthur Leveson | Rear Admiral Commanding HM Australian Fleet; 1918–1919 | Succeeded by John Dumaresq |
