= Baron Ongley =

Extinct title in the Peerage of Ireland

Baron Ongley, of Old Warden, was a title in the Peerage of Ireland. It was created on 30 July 1776 for Robert Henley-Ongley, Member of Parliament for Bedford and Bedfordshire. Born Robert Henley, he assumed the additional surname of Ongley as heir of his great-uncle Sir Samuel Ongley, of Old Warden, Bedfordshire. The barony became extinct on the death of his grandson, the third Baron, on 21 January 1877.

== Barons Ongley (1776) ==
- Robert Henley-Ongley, 1st Baron Ongley (c. 1721–1785)
- Robert Henley-Ongley, 2nd Baron Ongley (1771–1814)
- Robert Henley-Ongley, 3rd Baron Ongley (1803–1877)
