= Woodham Walter =

Village in Essex, England

Coordinates: 51.732°N 0.618°E

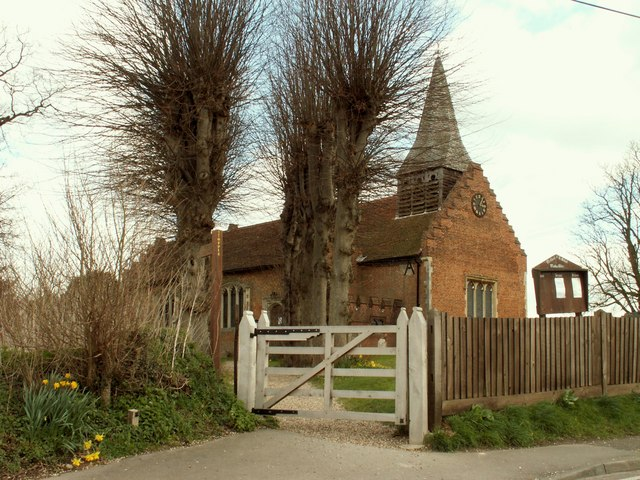
- St Michael's, Woodham Walter

- Location within Essex
- Population: 583 (Parish, 2021)
- OS grid reference: TL808070
- District: Maldon
- Shire county: Essex
- Region: East
- Country: England
- Sovereign state: United Kingdom
- Post town: Maldon
- Postcode district: CM9
- Dialling code: 01245 & 01621
- Police: Essex
- Fire: Essex
- Ambulance: East of England
- UK Parliament: Witham

Woodham Walter is a village and civil parish in the Maldon District of Essex, England. It lies about three miles west of the town of Maldon. At the 2021 census the parish had a population of 583.

== History ==
The village was first recorded as "Wudeham" in c. 875. The name, which means "village in the wood" is derived from the Old English words wudu (wood in modern English) and ham (home, or homestead). The modern name may derive from the Fitzwalter family who owned Woodham Walter Hall, a moated manor house in the village for many generations. The house was demolished in the 17th century by William Fytch.

There is evidence of earlier settlement. A hoard of silver coins was found in the village, dated to c. 700. At Oak Farm in 1991 three gold and bronze torcs were discovered; they have been dated to c. 1000 BC.

The Domesday Book of 1086 entry for Woodham Walter lists a population of 18.

== Local amenities ==
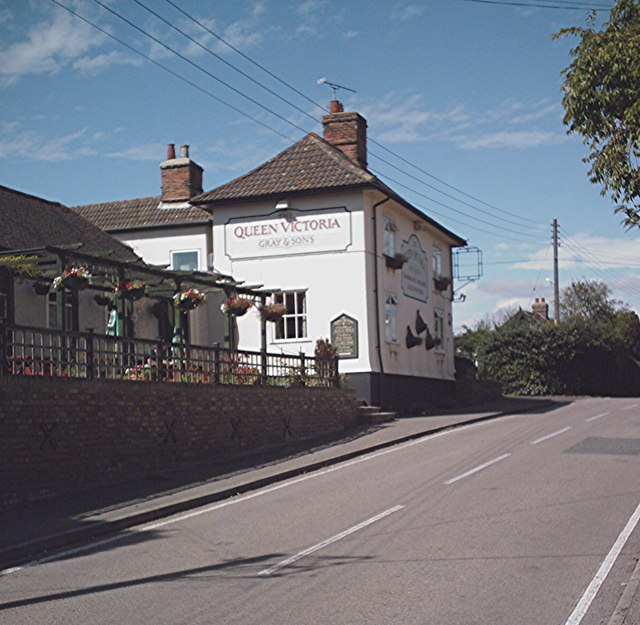
The Queen Victoria pub

There are three public houses, the Bell Inn, the Queen Victoria and The Cats.

== Education ==
There is one school in the village, Woodham Walter Church of England Voluntary Controlled Primary School. There are c. 75 students.

== Religious sites ==
Thomas, Earl of Sussex, obtained a licence from Elizabeth I on 26 June 1562 to build the new parish church of St Michael the Archangel. It was largely completed (of red brick) in 1563 and consecrated on 30 April 1564, making it probably England's first new post-Reformation Church of England place of worship.
