= George Lang (cricketer) =

English cricketer (1837–1898)

Personal information
- Full name: George Lukis Lang
- Born: 23 February 1837; Harrow, Middlesex, England
- Died: 2 June 1898 (aged 61); Camberley, Surrey, England
- Batting: Unknown
- Bowling: Unknown
- Relatives: Robert Lang (brother)

Career statistics
Competition	First-class
Matches	3
Runs scored	88
Batting average	29.33
100s/50s	–/1
Top score	50
Balls bowled	192
Wickets	9
Bowling average	9.22
5 wickets in innings	–
10 wickets in match	–
Best bowling	4/30
Catches/stumpings	–/–
- Source: Cricinfo, 6 August 2019

George Lukis Lang (23 February 1837 – 2 June 1898) was an English first-class cricketer.

The son of Arthur Lang, he was born at Harrow in February 1937. He was educated firstly at Harrow School, before attending Haileybury and Imperial Service College. Lang appeared three times in first-class cricket for the Gentlemen of England in 1856–57, making two appearances against the Gentlemen of Surrey and Sussex and once appearance against the Gentlemen of Kent and Sussex. He scored a total of 88 runs in his three matches, at an average of 29.33 and a high score of 50. With the ball, he took 9 wickets at a bowling average of 9.22 and best figures of 4 for 30. He left for British India in 1858, where he served in the Indian Civil Service until 1898. Lang died at Camberley in June 1898. His brother, Robert, also played first-class cricket.
