= George Lang (cinematographer) =

American director and cinematographer

- Teaching at the Santa Fe HD Workshop
- Occupation(s): Cinematographer, Director
- Awards: George Foster Peabody Award, 1994

George Lang is an American director and cinematographer.

== Career ==
With over thirty years experience in the entertainment industry, he has worked for a number of major media outlets as well as video mediums, with experience in broadcast television, corporate video, and advertising. He is also the founder and president of The Big Picture Film and Video Arts, a production company which he launched in 1997. He continues to serve as director of photography for broadcast and commercial shoots, and as director and producer of corporate videos and events.

Lang has trained with the F900 Sony Cine Alta High Definition Camera to help pioneer the HD 24p format over the last five years.. He still serves as instructor for the Santa Fe High Definition Workshops, held annually. .

== Awards ==
- Fred Sinfield Award(1979)- Best Live Shot
- Emmy Award(1980) KGO News "Market Street Sniper"
- Emmy Award(1980) ABC News "1980 Winter Olympics at Lake Placid"
- San Francisco Bay Area Press Association Award(1982)- Best Mini Documentaries
- RTNDA Award(1986) KGO TV "Vietnam War: Gone, But Not Forgotten"
- Emmy Award(1989) PBS "Paradise Lost on Bikini Atoll"
- Emmy Award(1994) ABC News "Rwanda Refugee Crisis"
- RTNDA Award(1994) KGO TV "Bushman"
- APTRA Award(1994)- Best Series
- George Foster Peabody Award, (1994)*
- Emmy Award(2011) Current TV "Jay Maisel Documentary"
