= Old Warden =

Village in Bedfordshire, England

Coordinates: 52.078°N 0.341°W

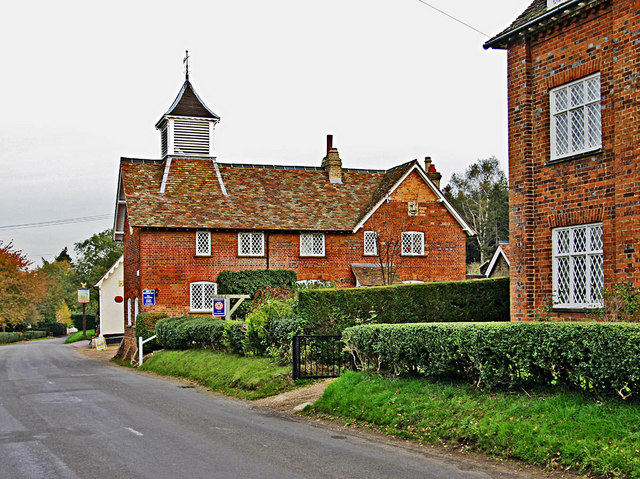
- Old Warden Post Office

- Location within Bedfordshire
- Population: 328
- OS grid reference: TL137438
- Civil parish: Old Warden
- Unitary authority: Central Bedfordshire
- Ceremonial county: Bedfordshire
- Region: East
- Country: England
- Sovereign state: United Kingdom
- Post town: Biggleswade
- Postcode district: SG18
- Dialling code: 01767
- Police: Bedfordshire
- Fire: Bedfordshire
- Ambulance: East of England
- UK Parliament: Mid Bedfordshire

Old Warden is a village and civil parish in the Central Bedfordshire district of the county of Bedfordshire, England, about 6.5 miles (10 km) south-east of the county town of Bedford.

The 2011 census shows its population as 328.

The Shuttleworth Collection of historic airplanes and motor vehicles is at Old Warden Aerodrome.

== History ==
The village grew up under the protection of the Cistercian Wardon or Warden Abbey nearby.

The first mention of a post office in the village is in 1873. The post office national archives record the issue to Old Warden in April 1890 of a type of postmark known as a rubber datestamp. The village post office closed on 14 October 2008. It was one of about 2,500 compulsory compensated closures of UK post office branches announced by the Government in 2007.

St Leonard's Parish Church is located in the village.

Francis William Bourdillon (1852–1921), poet, translator, bibliophile, and scholar was the son of Francis Bourdillon (1816–1912), vicar of Old Warden 1880–92.

The village is also noted for being the home of the Shuttleworth Trust, an organization committed to the preservation of transport artefacts – primarily bicycles, motor cars, and aeroplanes – produced in the early part of the 20th century. The corresponding collection is known as the Shuttleworth Collection. The estate also has buildings and gardens, and a small airfield from which many of the historic aircraft fly during the regular flying displays. The estate, museum, and airfield are open to visitors. The estate is also the home of Shuttleworth College founded in 1944.

== Governance ==
There are seven elected parish councillors. It is part of Northill ward for elections to the Central Bedfordshire Unitary Authority.

Prior to 1894, Old Warden was administered as part of the hundred of Wixamtree. From 1894 until 1974 it was part of Biggleswade Rural District and from 1974 to 2009 in Mid Bedfordshire District.

Old Warden is within the Mid Bedfordshire parliamentary constituency, whose member of parliament is Blake Stephenson of the Conservative Party.

== Education ==
The majority of this community is in the catchment zone for Robert Bloomfield Academy. This same area is in the catchment area for Samuel Whitbread Academy, which has upper secondary and sixth form.

== Sport and leisure ==
Both the Greensand Ridge Walk and the Greensand Cycle Way pass through Old Warden.

Old Warden Cricket Club play in the Bedfordshire Invitation League on a Saturday and Division 4 of the Bedfordshire County Cricket League on Sundays.
