= 1906 in motorsport =

The following is an overview of the events of 1906 in motorsport, including the major racing events, racing festivals, circuits that were opened and closed during a year, championships and non-championship events that were established and disestablished in a year, and births and deaths of racing drivers and other motorsport people.

== Annual events ==
The calendar includes only annual major non-championship events or annual events that had own significance separate from the championship. For the dates of the championship events see related season articles.

Date	Event	Ref
6 May	1st Targa Florio	

== Opened motorsport venues ==
- 29 January - opening of Aspendale Racecourse (Aspendale Speedway) near Melbourne (1906) was the world's first purpose-built motor racing circuit.

== Births ==
Date	Month	Name	Nationality	Occupation	Note	Ref
26	May	Mauri Rose	American	Racing driver	Indianapolis 500 winner (1941, 1947-1948).	
6	July	Cuth Harrison	British	Racing driver	One of the first British Formula One drivers.	
31	August	Raymond Sommer	French	Racing driver	24 Hours of Le Mans winner (1932, 1933).	
4	October	Eitel Cantoni	Uruguayan	Racing driver	The first Uruguayan Formula One driver.	
12	October	Piero Taruffi	Italian	Racing driver	1952 Swiss Grand Prix winner	
30	October	Giuseppe Farina	Italian	Racing driver	First Formula One World Champion.	
11	November	Bill Cummings	American	Racing driver	Indianapolis 500 winner (1934).	
