= Sabipa =

French racing driver (1890–1980)

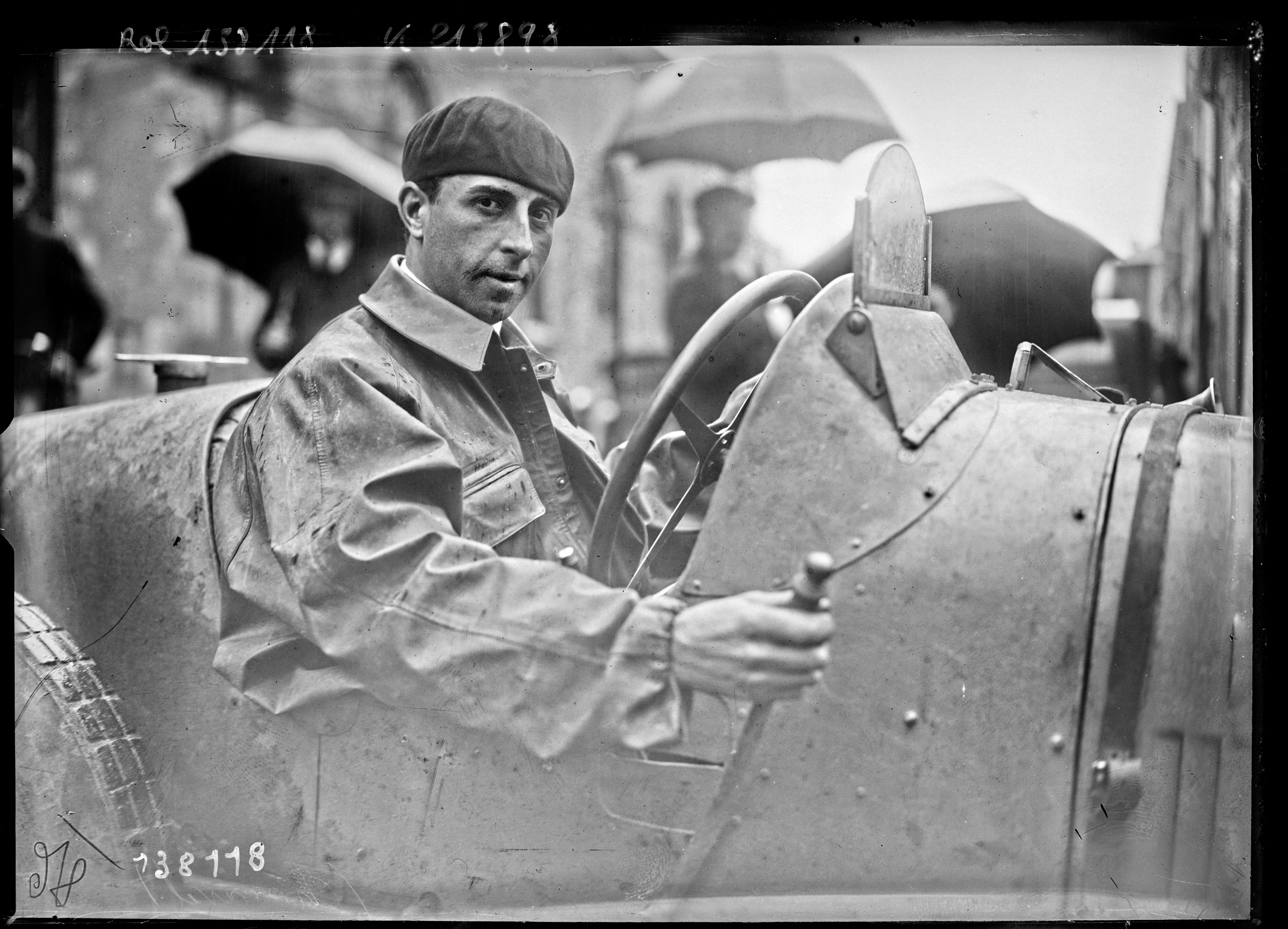
- At Le Mans in 1929
- Born: Louis Marie Paul Charavel; 3 August 1890 Saint-Germain-du-Puch, France
- Died: 11 September 1980 (aged 90) Neuilly-sur-Seine, France

"Sabipa", sometimes given as Jean Sabipa, was the nom de course of Louis Charavel, a French Grand Prix driver who won the 1926 Italian Grand Prix.

== Career ==
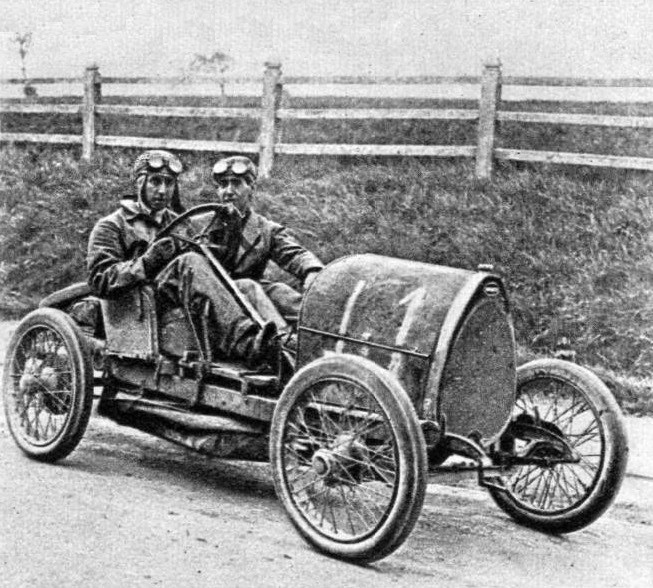
Making his debut at Boulogne in 1920, with a Bugatti T13

Charavel was an engineer from a wealthy family when he started racing after the First World War. In order to hide his activities from family and business associates, when registering with the Automobile Club de France as a driver, he did not want to use his real name, but did not have a pseudonym ready when asked what his name was - he responded "I don't know" ("je ne sabe pas") in his Provençal dialect and the ACF recorded it phonetically as "Jean Sabipa". Originally using a Bugatti Type 13 and focussing on hillclimbing events, he came 4th in the 1921 Cyclecar Grand Prix in a Weler. His first success of note came in the 12 Hours Tourist Trophy race at San Sebastian, turning up in his Bugatti just before the start, but "showing an extraordinary measure of endurance", won the 1,500cc class.

=== Grands Prix and Grandes Épreuves ===
In 1926 he was selected as a third driver for the Bugatti factory team at the Italian Grand Prix. Team leader Jules Goux retired while leading, and second driver (and team manager) Meo Costantini suffered engine trouble late in the race, which handed "Sabipa" an almost unchallenged victory, as the only healthy car running at the finish.

It was his only success, although he finished 2nd in the 1927 Grand Prix de Boulogne, mechanical trouble costing him the lead on the final lap, and made his Le Mans 24 Hour debut in 1928, in a one-off drive for the Itala team.

"Sabipa" was lucky to survive serious accidents in the 1927 Targa Florio (escaping unhurt after his car hit a boulder and was propelled 50 feet below the road, into an orchard), and the 1930 French Grand Prix, almost being run over by Tim Birkin's Bentley, having been thrown out onto the track - "Sabipa" had remained conscious and told Birkin the following year that Birkin had missed him by two inches. "Sabipa" may have been saved on both occasions as he was an early adopter of a crash helmet, wearing one from at least 1927, accompanied by a yellow oilskin.

=== Le Mans ===
After the last accident, he spent a year away from the sport, returning to share an Alfa Romeo 6C with Odette Siko at the 1932 24 Hours of Le Mans, the pair finishing 4th and winning the 2 litre class - as at 2026 the fourth place finish for Siko remains the best result for a woman in the event.

"Sabipa" retired after the following year's event, in which Siko crashed their Alfa while they were running 5th. In 1959, he adopted Monegasque citizenship, and he died in Paris in 1980.

== External sites ==
- Le Mans record
- Motorsport Memorial
- Results on Golden Age of Grand Prix Racing
