= Pat Driscoll =

British motorcyclist and racing driver (1900–1983)

- Born: Leonard Patrick Driscoll; 5 December 1900 Chiswick, Middlesex
- Died: 8 June 1983 (aged 82) Hayling Island, Hampshire

Pat Driscoll on Norton 588cc racing sidecar in 1928

Leonard Patrick "Pat" Driscoll (5 December 1900 – 8 June 1983) was a motorcycle racer of the 1920s, who switched from two (and sometimes three) wheels to four in the 1930s.

== Motorcycle racing ==
Driscoll was from a mechanically-minded family; his grandfather Denis O'Driscoll was chief engineer to the John Fowler & Co agricultural engineering company. He started racing motorcycles at Brooklands in 1920, originally on an Indian Powerplus but soon switching to Norton, joining the O'Donovan team in 1924. A talented engineer and engine-builder, he built a series of record-setting machines, and, together with Bert Denly, set a number of world records at Brooklands in the late 1920s; Driscoll won 200 races in three years on both two wheels and three, before turning to cars in 1930.

== Car racing ==
Driscoll's first car race was at the Brooklands Double 12 Hour Race in 1932, driving a 1.5l supercharged Lea Francis, finishing third in class. He was scouted by the Austin Motor Company the following season to replace the injured S. C. H. Davis and eventually became the lead works driver.

Driscoll's first appearance at the 24 Hours of Le Mans, in 1932, sharing an Aston Martin International Le Mans with Aston chief engineer A C Bertelli, saw him secure a major triumph, as the pair won the Coupe Biennale. The following year Driscoll shared an International with Clifton Penn-Hughes and collected another first prize, this time for winning the 1.5 litre class.

Driscoll took part in one national Grand Prix, the 1935 Donington Grand Prix, stepping into Wal Handley's Riley 2000, but the duo were flagged off after completing 115 of the 120 scheduled laps, Driscoll struggling with brakes in the latter half of the race.

He continued with record-setting runs in cars; in 1936 he set the Brooklands Mountain 750cc class record in an adapted Austin 7 at over 77mph, a record which was never beaten. He also had a good run in the British Empire Trophy, being ahead of Raymond Mays in a works E.R.A. when forced into retirement. However, at the Blackwell hillclimb (near Bristol) later in the year, a mechanical failure sent his Austin into a serious accident, the injuries from which forced his retirement.

Driscoll died of cancer at his Hayling Island home in 1983.

== Results ==
=== Le Mans ===
Year	Team	Co-Drivers	Car	Class	Laps	Pos.	Class Pos.
1932	(United Kingdom) Aston Martin	(United Kingdom) A C Bertelli	Aston Martin International	1.5	153	7th	3rd
1933	(United Kingdom) Aston Martin	(United Kingdom) Clifton Penn-Hughes	Aston Martin International	1.5	189	5th	1st
1935	(United Kingdom) Austin Motor Company	(United Kingdom) Don Parish	Austin 7	<1.0	106	ret	ret

=== Sportscars ===
- Sportscars
