= 1932 24 Hours of Le Mans =

10th 24 Hours of Le Mans endurance race

Previous: 1931	Next: 1933
Index: Races | Winners

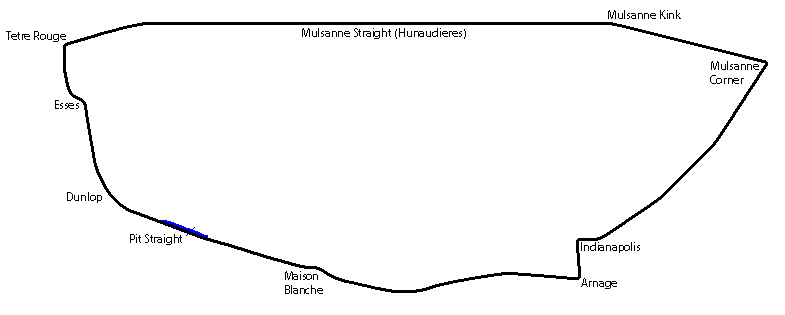
Le Mans in 1932

The 1932 24 Hours of Le Mans was the 10th Grand Prix of Endurance that took place at the Circuit de la Sarthe on 18 and 19 June 1932. A significant year for the Automobile Club de l'Ouest (ACO) with the biggest changes to the circuit in the race's history. A new section bypassing Pontlieue suburb was built starting with a long right turn after the pits, going over a hill then down to the Esses, a left-right combination, before rejoining the Hunaudières straight at the new right-hand corner of Tertre Rouge. This shortened the track by almost 3 km down to 13.491 km (8.383 mi).

On paper it looked like it would be a race between the seven 2.3-litre supercharged Alfa Romeos and the two similarly powered Bugatti T55 four-seaters (backed by the Bugatti factory). But from the start it was the Alfa Romeos that set the pace, led by the two works cars in a furious duel. But a first-lap accident by a privateer Bentley at the tricky White House corners caused much disruption for drivers who would not slow down. First Minoia went off at the same place, taking Brisson's Stutz with him, then Marinoni smacked the Bentley trying to make up for an hour lost digging himself out from the Arnage sandbank after another excursion.

After the first pit stops around 6pm, the works Alfa of Franco Cortese held the lead. But when that car had to pit around 10pm to get its windscreen fixed, it was the similar car of 1931 winners, Earl Howe and Birkin that took its place. Their chance of a repeat win ended with a blown gasket at 3am, whereupon Raymond Sommer took the lead. He was forced to drive most of the race himself as his co-driver, Italian ex-pat Luigi Chinetti, had got a fever after working long hours to prepare their short-wheelbase Alfa Romeo for the race. Having driven one 3-hour shift Chinetti was unable to do any more.

As dawn broke, Cortese/Guidotti were closing on him, but their challenge wilted as they had to make repeated stops to secure loose and broken parts of their car. Their delays allowed the remaining Bugatti of Czaykowski / Friderich, now running third seven laps back, to start chasing them down. That chase came to an end though after midday, when the Bugatti came to a halt on the track having got down to four laps in arrears. This took the pressure off the two Alfa Romeos.

Meanwhile, behind the race for outright victory was the quest for winning the Biennial Cup. The initial six eligible cars from the 1931 race had quickly been whittled down to just three: the 3-litre Talbot, versus the smaller 1.5-litre Aston Martin and 1.1-litre Caban. For most of the race, the three cars were running very closely to their designated target distances. Just as one would start building a lead over the others it would be stymied by mechanical delays. As the main race ran down to a predictable finish, it was only on the Sunday afternoon that the Aston Martin of "Bert" Bertelli / Pat Driscoll got enough reliability to pull out a sufficient gap to claim the Biennial Cup.

In the end Sommer won by two laps. In a remarkable drive he had been at the wheel for over twenty hours, and during the Sunday, the exhaust pipe had broken that left it pumping its noxious fumes into the cockpit. His distance covered also won the Index of Performance, going over 20% beyond the designated target. Cortese and Guidotti were second in the works Alfa Romeo. After many tribulations, the Talbot of Lewis / Rose-Richards had pushed hard enough to finish third, albeit 36 laps behind. Fourth was Odette Siko’s privateer Alfa Romeo entry – still the best overall finish by a female driver at Le Mans.

== Regulations and organisation ==
This was a watershed year for the Automobile Club de l'Ouest (ACO) with a number of major changes happening all at once. It saw the end, after nine years, of the partnership with founding-sponsor Rudge-Whitworth, as money problems drastically affected the British wheel-parts company. The Cup was thus renamed the Biennial Cup of the Automobile Club de l'Ouest.

The suburban growth of the city of Le Mans caused the second major change: residents’ complaints had already forced the removal of the Pontlieue hairpin in 1929. So, in 1931 the ACO acquired 75 hectares of land beyond the start-finish straight and set about constructing a completely new section of track to bypass the transit into the city's southern suburbs. Bounded by earth banking and wattle fencing, the new section started with a sweeping right-hand turn after the finish-line, cresting a low hill before dropping into a technical left-right series of corners (the Esses). The track then rejoined the main road to Tours - the Hunaudières Straight – at the new corner of Tertre Rouge (“red hillock”) named after the major rise the new track traversed.

This shortened the circuit by almost 3 km down to 13.491 km (8.383 mi). The new track set the basis for the iconic layout and has remained essentially the same ever since aside from periodic deviations added to improve safety and surfacing. New viewing and camping areas on the ACO land increased the official capacity to around 60000 spectators. which also saw the start of an extensive new public entertainment “village”. There were also two footbridges built over the new section to allow pedestrian access to the infield (originally sponsored by Champion Sparkplugs)

The reduced track also demanded an overhaul of all the lap-distance scaling needed for the Index of Performance and the restrictions on fluid replenishment. The ACO gave handsome distance reductions to the smaller engines, while the premier 3-litre class had its required distance raised. The minimum refuelling distance of 320 km / 200 miles was recalculated from 20 laps on the old 16.4 km circuit to 24 laps of the new 13.5 km one.

Recognising the current trend to put bigger engines in popular runabout models, the 2-seater eligibility was extended from 1.0 up to include 1.5-litre cars as well. The ACO also removed the longstanding requirement for each car to carry ballast representing passengers was finally rescinded, greatly reducing the cars weight (180 kg for cars over 3-litres for example) and improving handling performance. The equivalence formula for supercharged engine capacity was adjusted slightly from 130% to 133%.

Given the tribulations that many teams had the previous year with tyre wear, to encourage tyre development, the ACO mandated that each car could only use seven new tyres in the race, including the four it started on. The committee also awarded the fuel-supply contract to Société l’Économique, French agent for Esso/Standard Motor Oil. This was with a view to alternating the contract each year between them and Shell. The company had previously had the contract for the 1927 race. This year it offered three fuel choices: its regular fuel, the new Esso premium grade or 100% benzole.

Engine size	1931 Minimum distance	1932 Minimum distance	Average speed	Equivalent laps	Minimum vehicle weight
4000cc+	2,600 km (1,600 mi)	2,600 km (1,600 mi)	108.3 km/h (67.3 mph)	192.7 laps	1215 kg (5L); 1820 kg (8L)
3000cc	2,390 km (1,490 mi)	2,424 km (1,506 mi)	101.0 km/h (62.8 mph)	179.7 laps	875 kg
1500cc	2,260 km (1,400 mi)	2,000 km (1,200 mi)	83.3 km/h (51.8 mph)	148.2 laps	670 kg
1100cc	2,100 km (1,300 mi)	1,800 km (1,100 mi)	75.0 km/h (46.6 mph)	133.4 laps	430 kg
750cc	1,785 km (1,109 mi)	1,550 km (960 mi)	64.6 km/h (40.1 mph)	114.9 laps	330 kg

== Entries ==
The global economic recession meant a dearth of big-engined cars was being produced, and the six cars entered over 4-litres were all 1920s vintage and showing their age. The team to beat was undoubtedly Alfa Romeo, currently dominating Grand Prix racing, and the marque was the best represented in the entry list with 7 cars. Bugatti was their main opposition, supporting entries made by its works-team drivers. Both manufacturers fielded straight-8 supercharged cars of about 2.3-litres (equal to 3-litres with the 1.33 equivalency factor). The only other works team present came from Aston Martin with the remaining entries coming from privateer teams and “gentleman-drivers”.

After the record low number of finishers in the 1931 race there were only six cars eligible for the Biennial Cup (although when the Mercedes-Benz entry did not arrive this became five).

Category	Entries	Classes
Large-sized engines	14 / 10	over 3-litre
Medium-sized engines	17 / 15	1.0 to 3-litre
Small-sized engines	2 / 1	up to 1.0-litre
Total entrants	33 / 26	

- Note: The first number is the number of entries, the second the number who started.

Alfa Romeo's dominance in the racing year had started with victory in the Mille Miglia for the works team, and then in the Targa Florio for the works-supported Scuderia Ferrari. The 8C-2300 Monza was modified for Le Mans with a 4-seater lungo (long) touring body styled by Carrozzeria Touring. Five were prepared for the works drivers as well as three customer entries. The two works cars had a finer tuning with exclusive engine parts to increase their output and supercharger power. Their drivers were Franco Cortese/Giovanni Battista Guidotti and "Nando" Minoia/Carlo Canavesi. The Alfa test-driver, Attilio Marinoni, was seconded to the customer car of Georgian-exile Prince Dmitri Djordjadze, with Mille Miglia specialist Angelo Guatta as his co-driver.

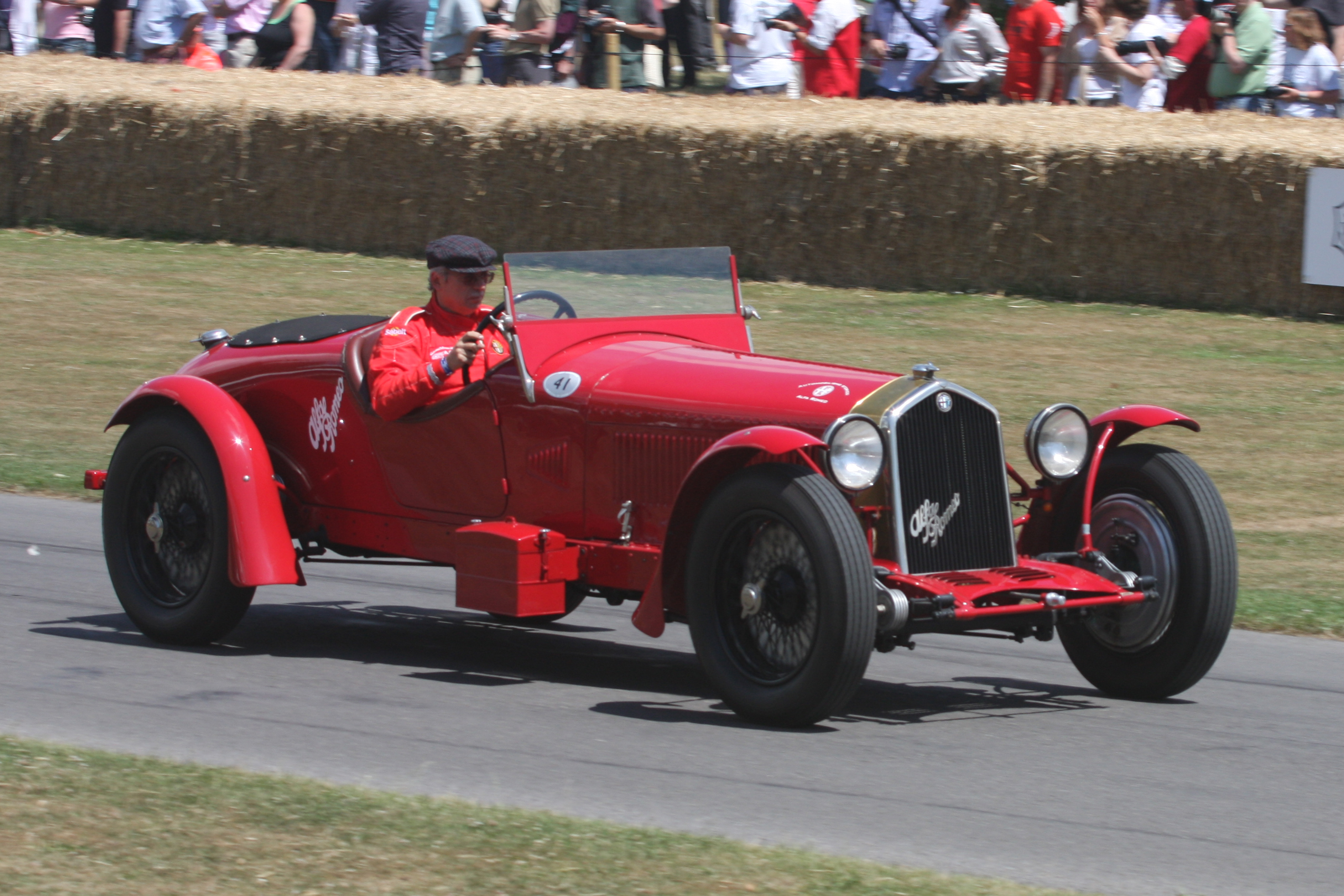
Alfa Romeo 8C-2300

Earl Francis Howe, winner in the previous year's race, had one of the brand new cars, once again running it with former Bentley-Boy, Sir Henry "Tim" Birkin. The wealthy Parisian bankers, Pierre Louis-Dreyfus and Antoine Schumann, traded their Bugatti this year for the fifth lungo car. A smaller 6C-1750 model was also entered by Miss Odette Siko in the 3-litre class. She raced with Louis Charavel (using the pseudonym "Sabipa"), having his first race after surviving a bad accident at the 1930 French Grand Prix at Pau.

Raymond Sommer, rising star of French motor-racing, had spied a short-wheelbase Mille Miglia corto 8C on display at the Paris Salon. He bought the car and asked Luigi Chinetti, an Italian émigré running the Alfa Romeo agency in Paris, about converting it to a four-door for touring car racing. The car was fitted with two small rear seats, an oversize fueltank, streamlined fairings and an externally-mounted exhaust (to reduce engine temperatures). It was also the only Alfa Romeo running on Englebert tyres, while the others ran on Dunlop. The shorter wheelbase gave better handling as well as being 100 kg lighter. Sommer also engaged Chinetti as his co-driver.

After a tragic race the year before, Ettore Bugatti was very wary about any bad press to the company if a similar accident were to happen again. No works team officially arrived however two cars were entered under the drivers’ names with strong works’ backing. Bugatti’s new car, the Type 55, was a tourer based on the T54 using the supercharged 2.3L racing engine of the Type 51. But being a two-seater, it was ineligible to run at Le Mans for its engine size. Instead the T55 power-train and running gear was retrofitted onto the older Type 44 four-seater model. The engine was slightly detuned down to 130 bhp. They were run by Guy Bouriat with Louis Chiron, and Russian émigré Count Stanisław Czaykowski with French veteran Ernest Friderich (who had won the voiturette race here in 1920 for Bugatti). There were also two other privateer entries. Jean Sébilleau returned with his 1.5-litre Type 37 that he had raced the year before, while Charles Druck had a Type 40 tourer with its supercharged 1.5-litre engine.

The biggest cars in the race were veterans of the 1920s. Three Mercedes-Benz SSKs were entered though only that of Henri Stoffel (who had finished second the previous year) actually turned up. This year, rather than drive, he entered it for Marseille brothers Marcel and Paul Foucret. Édouard Brisson brought his Stutz back for a fifth time, paired again with Parisian luxury-car dealer Joseph Cattaneo. Jean Trévoux had bought the supercharged “Blower” Bentley run by Dudley Benjafield and Giulio Ramponi in the 1930 race. It got prepared for the race by Tim Birkin's race-tuning business in London, Birkin and Couper Ltd.

Talbot returned with the AV105, through their Fox & Nicholl customer team, after a surprisingly strong run in the Mille Miglia. However, finances limited the entry to only one car - to contest the Biennial Cup. The engine had been improved to now produce 132 bhp, and a new gearbox was installed. It would be driven by team stalwarts Brian Lewis, Baron Essendon and Tim Rose-Richards.

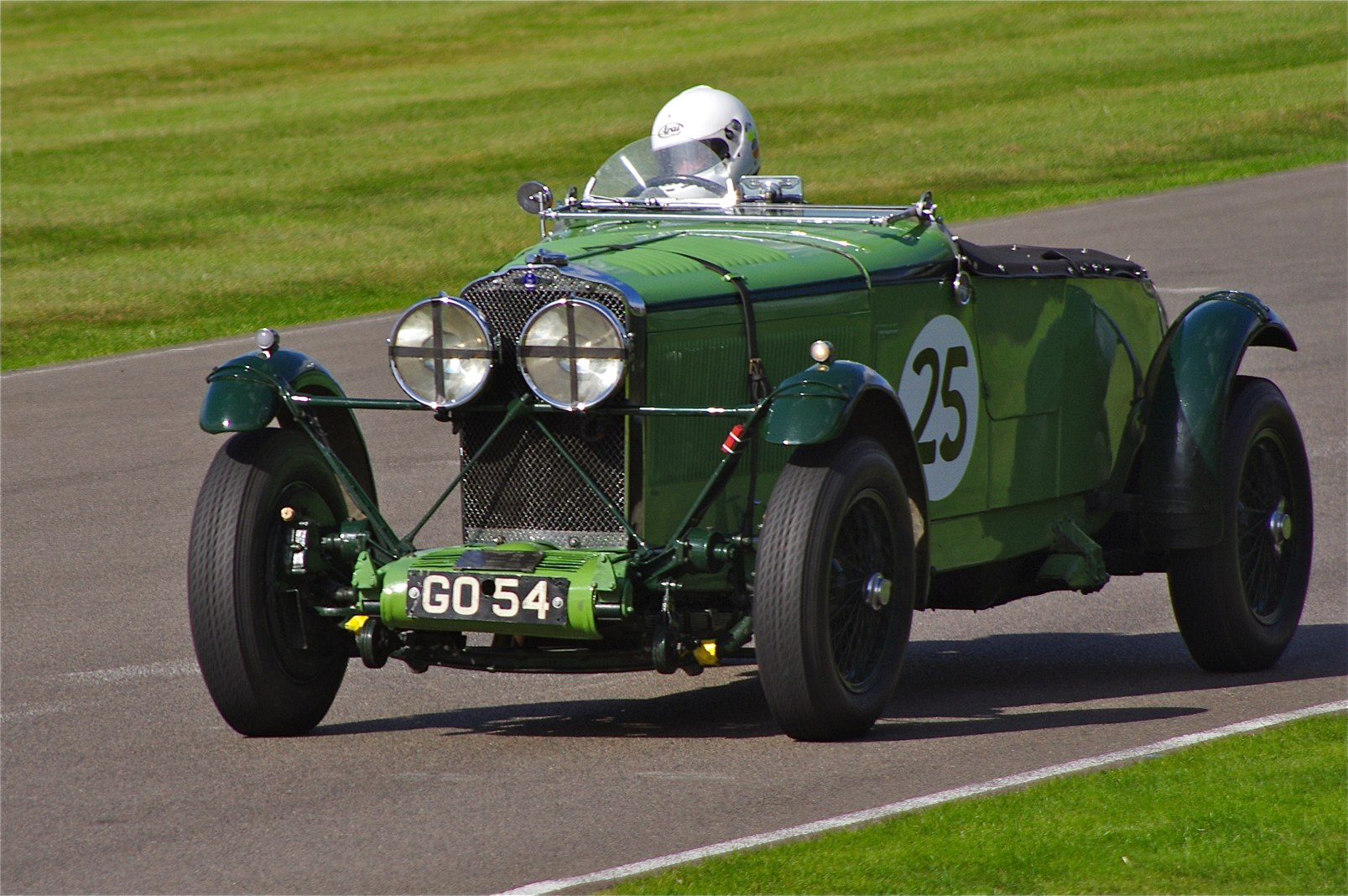
Talbot AV105

Aston Martin had now gone into production of its Mark 2 International model. Three two-door ‘Le Mans’ variants were prepared for the race. Technical Director and designer "Bert" Bertelli ran the Biennial Cup entry with Pat Driscoll, while Ken Peacock/Jack Besant and Sammy Newsome/Henken Widengren ran the other two cars. The team was managed by Sammy Davis, experienced Le Mans winner for Bentley in 1927.

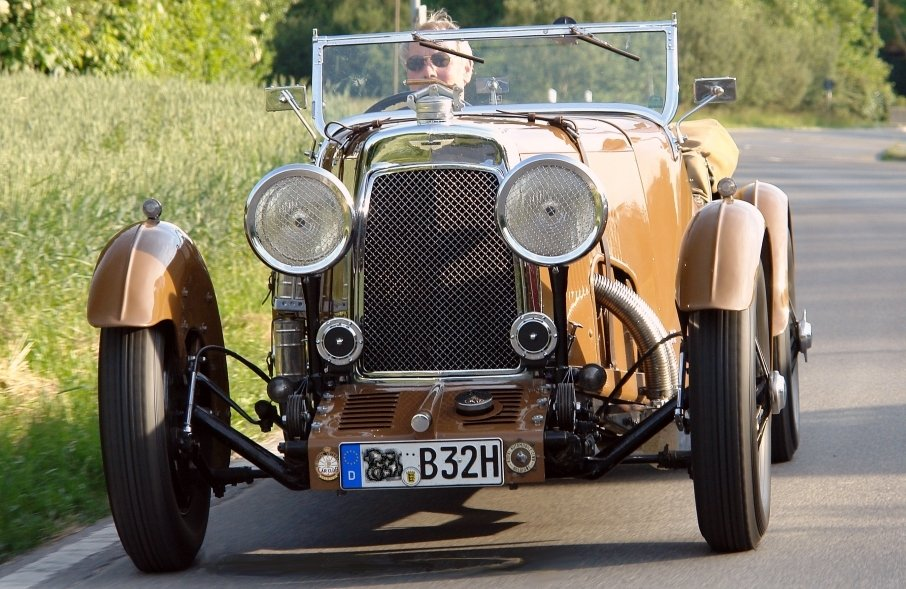
1932 Aston Martin International

Wealthy gentleman-racer Henri de la Sayette entered the first Citroën to race at Le Mans. His C4 model was fitted with a standard open-top touring body. But its 1554cc engine put it in the 2-litre category with the supercharged Alfa Romeo against which it was badly under-powered. Curiously, for its engine size it was given a lower target distance (147 laps) than the smaller 1490cc Aston Martins (148 laps).(See the photograph of the scoreboard below for evidence of car #19)

Yves Giraud-Cabantous and Roger Labric came back this year to contest the Biennial Cup in their small voiturettes. They hoped the easing of their required laps would prove a decisive advantage against the bigger cars. Once again, the two of them shared the driving in the Caban, while Duverne / Boréal ran Labric's other entry, a BNC 527 Sport. Unlike the Caban, the latter car had its reliable Ruby engine replaced with an affiliated Lombard one.

Salmson had been a strong force in voiturette racing in the 1920s with Émile Petit's innovative twin-cam engines. It returned to Le Mans for the first time in four years. The Grand Sport Spéciale was an upgraded derivative with a double overhead cam engine and four-speed gearbox. This year Just-Émile Vernet/Fernand Vallon swapped the Caban-Salmson for a second-hand GSS of 1926 vintage.

Their perennial competition during that time was Amilcar. However, with the financial depression its new owners had pulled the company out of motor-racing. The MCO models were sold to José Scaron who raced them very successfully. The remainder went to its Parisian distributor, Clément-Auguste Martin, who modified them slightly and prepared them for amateur racers. For Le Mans, Martin entered a 1926-vintage CO model with a normally-aspirated 1.1-litre engine putting out 44 bhp.

Despite having a breakout season in 1931 with the C-type Midget, only a single MG arrived at Le Mans. Francis Samuelson returned, this time with the supercharged version. This time his co-driver was Norman Black, who had won the 1931 Tourist Trophy on handicap in his own C-Type.

Two other small-engine manufacturers made their debut this year. Automobiles Rally had been founded in 1921, initially licence-assembly of Harley-Davidson cyclecars before building their own cars, popular in racing. The new N-series had a 1.3-litre DOHC Salmson engine and four-speed gearbox. The NCP (court puissée meaning ‘short powerful’) was a short-wheelbase racing version. Alta was a new English company set up by Geoffrey Taylor. The 1.1-litre Alta Sports entered had been bought by John Ford, and was fitted with aluminium- and magnesium-cast engine components to reduce weight.

== Practice and pre-race ==
Drama followed the Talbot team driving from England to the event. The car carrying the crew crashed encountering unmarked roadworks, putting several in hospital with minor injuries. Arthur Fox was also one of several managers unhappy with only evening practices that would not allow teams to tune their cars to hot daytime temperatures.

The new track layout was officially opened in a ceremony before the start of the Wednesday practice.

The extensive work on modifying and preparing Sommer's Alfa Romeo in time meant long hours on race week and left Chinetti quite exhausted. During the practice sessions, there seemed little to choose between the times put up by the Alfa Romeos and the Bugattis.

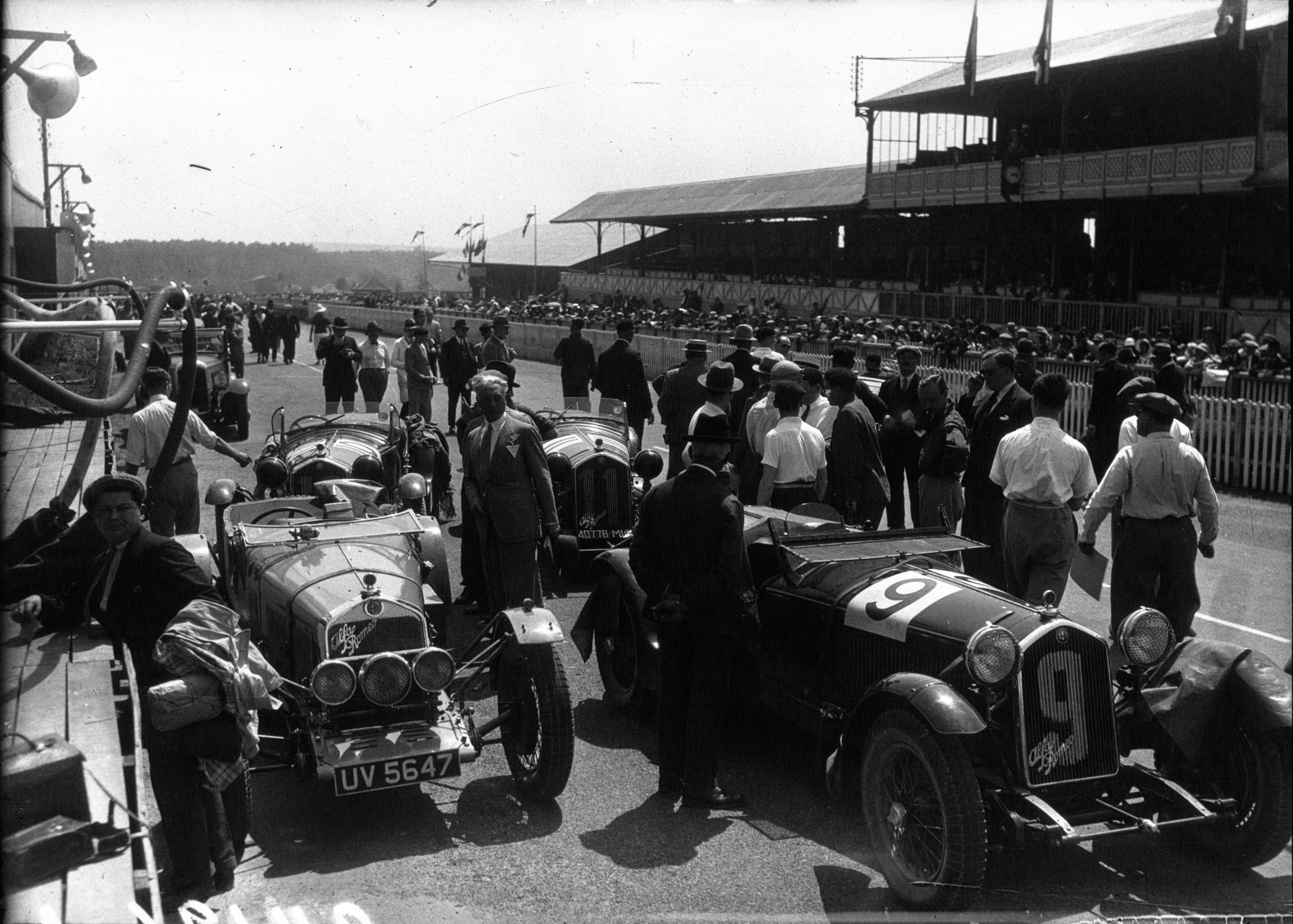
Alfa Romeos being wheeled onto the grid

Race day was an extremely hot day. This would cause issues with tar melting, and seeping through the new road-surface. The pre-race ceremonies included Englishmen George Eyston and John Cobb showed off their Land speed record cars. Earl Howe then did a lap in the race-winning car from the previous year. Finally a minute's silence was held to commemorate André Boillot, a top French driver of the post-war period, who had been killed at a hill-climb event just a fortnight earlier.

== Race ==
=== Start ===
Race director Charles Faroux struggled to hold back the over-keen drivers running across the road to their cars, requiring several recalls before waving his yellow flag to start the race. Straight away Cortese and Minoia put their works Alfas into the lead. At the end of the first lap the leading cars came by in close formation – the Alfas of Cortese, Minoia and Birkin, then the Mercedes and the Alfas of Marinoni and Dreyfus. Next were the Bugattis split by Sommer in the other Alfa Romeo. The rest of the field had been spread out by an accident at the White House curves. Jean Trévoux bought his Bentley through too quickly on the first bend, spun and rolled. Trévoux was thrown clear but suffered a broken wrist and two significant dents in his tin crash helmet, which undoubtedly saved his life.

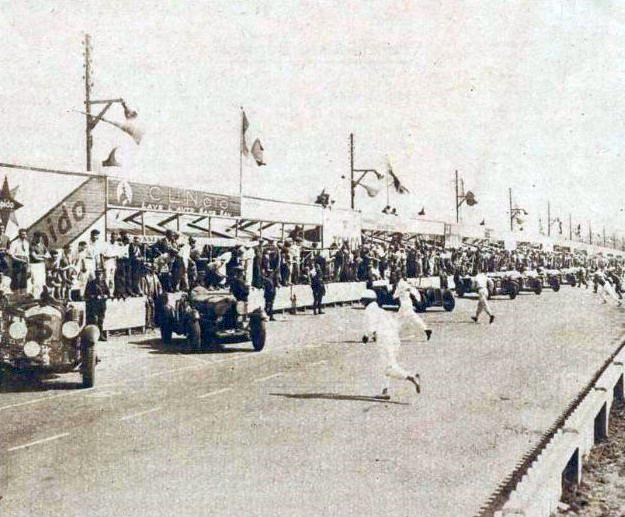
Start of the race

Also in trouble on the first laps were the Talbot and the three works Aston Martins, which all came into the pits with bad misfires. After delays and repeat visits to the pits, the causes were traced to the heat and the different French fuel fouling up the spark plugs. Changing the plugs did not do much to help until the temperature cooled going into the evening. In fact, the Talbot did not complete two consecutive laps without pitting until 5pm. The small cars suffered, with the Alta, BNC, Rally and Citroën all having problems early on and retiring within the first hour or so.

Meanwhile, team-mates Cortese and Minoia were racing very hard, passing and repassing, cutting each other off, shaking fists at the other – much to the exasperation of team manager Aldo Giovannini who had told all the Alfa drivers not to exceed 5100rpm to preserve their cars. Marinoni likewise put in some very fast laps, overtaking all ahead of him to take the lead by lap five. But then in his haste he went off at the tight Arnage corner and put his car into the sandbank. It cost him over an hour to dig himself out, putting him at the back of the field. This left Cortese and Minoia to resume their battle.

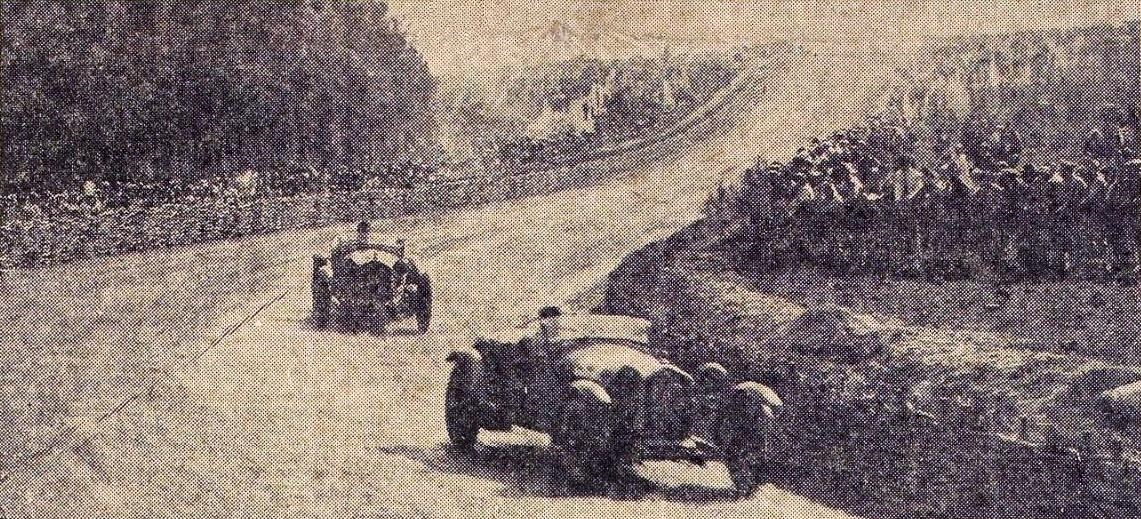
The two works Alfas in the new track-section

More drama unfolded just as the first pit-stops were due after the 24th lap and 6pm. Although the Bentley was still being cleared at White House and officials kept trying to wave flags to slow the cars down, many ignored the warnings. Minoia approached at speed, deciding to lap the Brisson's Stutz (running ninth) just before the corner. He lost control getting through the bottleneck, spinning and hit the bank. Brisson, trying to take evasive action from the broadsided Alfa also put his car into the bank. Neither driver was seriously hurt but both cars were out the race.

Then Marinoni, in his haste to make up time, smacked the static Bentley hard when he got off-road when foolishly lapping a slower car in the bends. With four derelict cars now parked at White House, memories were evoked of the epic crash in the 1927 race but fortunately the daylight allowed the road to be cleared eventually. The Alfas were dragged through a gate into a field, while the Bentley was just tipped over into the roadside ditch. After several attempts at tug-of-war by 20 spectators and officials, the Stutz was pulled out of the ditch and Brisson crawled it back to the pits to retire. Just before Marinoni's accident, Dreyfus had also gone off. In his keenness to keep up with the professional drivers he had come into Indianapolis too fast, got sideways and hit the bank with the car ending up on its side. Suddenly half the Alfa Romeos were out and the race was not even three hours old.

Once the chaos died down after the first pit-stops Cortese, driving a double-shift, was leading from the Alfas of Birkin/Howe and Sommer/Chinetti. Then came the works Bugattis and the Mercedes. Next to fall was the Foucret's Mercedes, out with a seized piston soon after 7pm. Bouriat's Bugatti was marooned out on the track having run out of fuel after an errant stone punctured the petrol tank. With all the delays and accidents affecting the field, the little MG of Samuelson/Black found itself in twelfth position.

By 8 o’clock, the order had the three Alfas still out in front from Czaykowski's Bugatti. Further back were the smaller Aston Martins of Newsome and Bertelli with Samuelson now up to seventh, and only fifteen cars, in total, left running heading towards dusk. Lewis only completed his twenty-four laps after 8pm. Fox told the Talbot team to fit all the spare engine components that, by regulation, had to be carried aboard the car if they were to be needed. This stop cost forty minutes and Rose-Richards brought the Talbot back out in 11th position.

The race for the Biennial Cup was developing into a very close contest between Howe's Alfa, Bertelli's Aston Martin, the Talbot and the Caban. The scoreboard kept a record of each car's lap and its target laps, so the spectators could keep appraised of the competition. The picture shows the scoreboard tracking all the cars, in the early afternoon: Sommer's #8 leading the Index with a current score of 1.111, having done 200 laps. He has already exceeded his target distance of 181 laps (2440 km). Each car number colour-coded by its nationality.

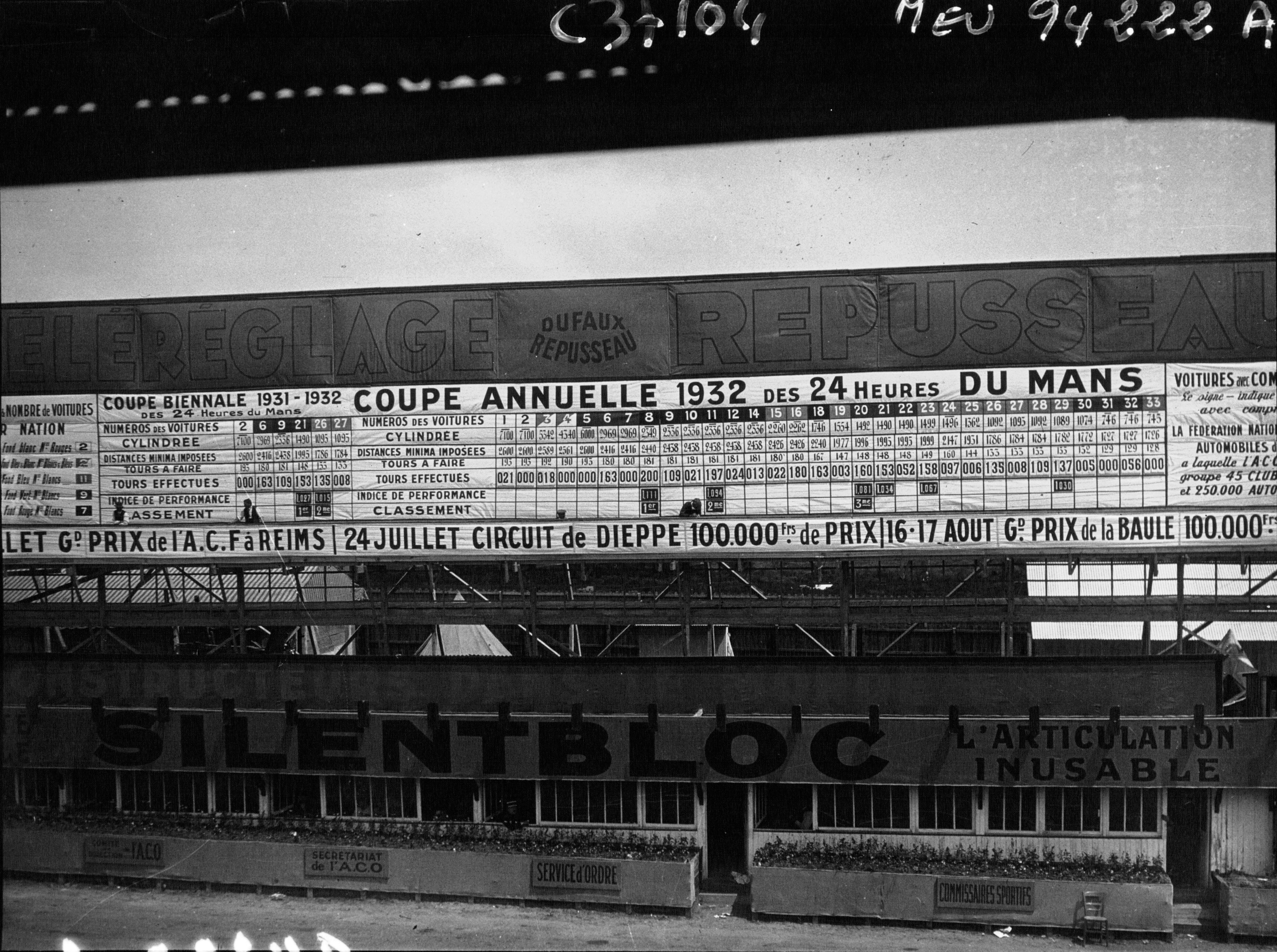
Scoreboard on Sunday afternoon

=== Night ===
Soon after 10pm, when Guidotti had relieved Cortese, he was back in the pits to fix a broken windscreen bracket. This dropped them down to third behind the Alfas of Howe/Birkin and Sommer/Chinetti. Just after midnight, the MG was stopped by a bolt breaking on the fuel tank which led to it splitting, and the third Aston Martin also retired when a rocker arm broke.

At 2am, Lewis brought the Talbot in with a damaged throttle and an hour was lost fabricating a fix. With nothing left to lose, the two drivers pushed on and drove the car very hard to make up the lost time. The 1931 winners held the lead until 3am, when they were stopped by a head-gasket failure. This meant that Raymond Sommer in turn took the lead. He had had to pick up all the driving duties after Chinetti had got a fever and was too ill to drive anymore after his first stint.

=== Morning ===
As dawn broke, Cortese and Guidotti, were driving hard and catching the leader several laps ahead. However their hard work was thwarted by stops to secure broken parts – firstly fenders, then headlamps, then the battery-box. The delays in turn allowed the remaining Bugatti of Czaykowski / Friderich, seven laps adrift, to close on them. With the attrition and their own strong driving through the night, Lewis and Rose-Richards, had got themselves up to fourth by 8am.

The Bugatti tourer of Druck/Virlouvet had been experiencing strong brake-wear through the night and with no spare pads on board, the drivers had been driving cautiously. However, in the morning Druck found himself with no brakes at the end of the Mulsanne straight and took the escape road and the fences beyond.

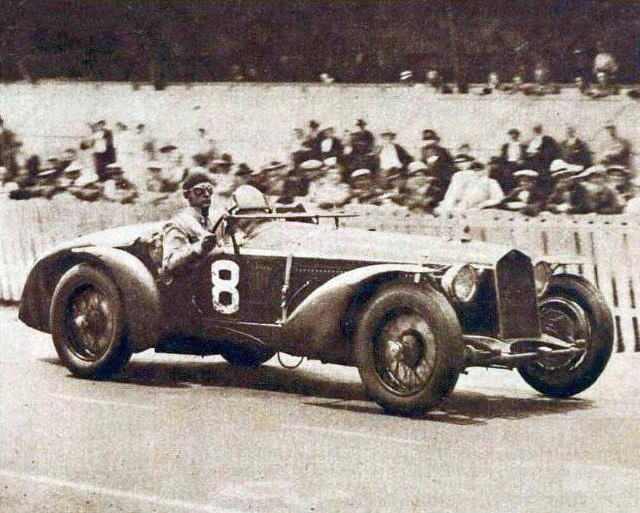
Sommer passing the grandstand in his Alfa Romeo

It was not all plain-sailing for Sommer. Pushing on single-handed, he was not helped when the externally-mounted exhaust pipe broke, pumping fumes across the driver for the rest of the race. At 10.15 Lewis pitted the Talbot with a misfire, but after changing another sparkplug the engine refused to restart. This further delay changing a battery cost them the chance for the Biennial Cup and even put them in danger of missing their target distance.

Hopes amongst the local crowd for a possible French victory were dashed, however soon after noon when the Bugatti stopped at Arnage with a broken piston from a detached oil line, having made back three laps. Unlike the main race, the chase for the Biennial Cup went right down to the wire in a three-way battle. The little Caban kept circulating reliably while its bigger competitors stuttered and stalled. Bertelli's Aston had developed a water leak and its front fenders worked loose, while the Talbot lost more time in the afternoon replacing a valve-spring.

=== Finish and post-race ===
After a heroic drive, Sommer held on to take the victory after driving for over twenty hours. His pace was sufficient to also win the Index of Performance. After their delays Cortese and Guidotti come home only two laps in arrears.

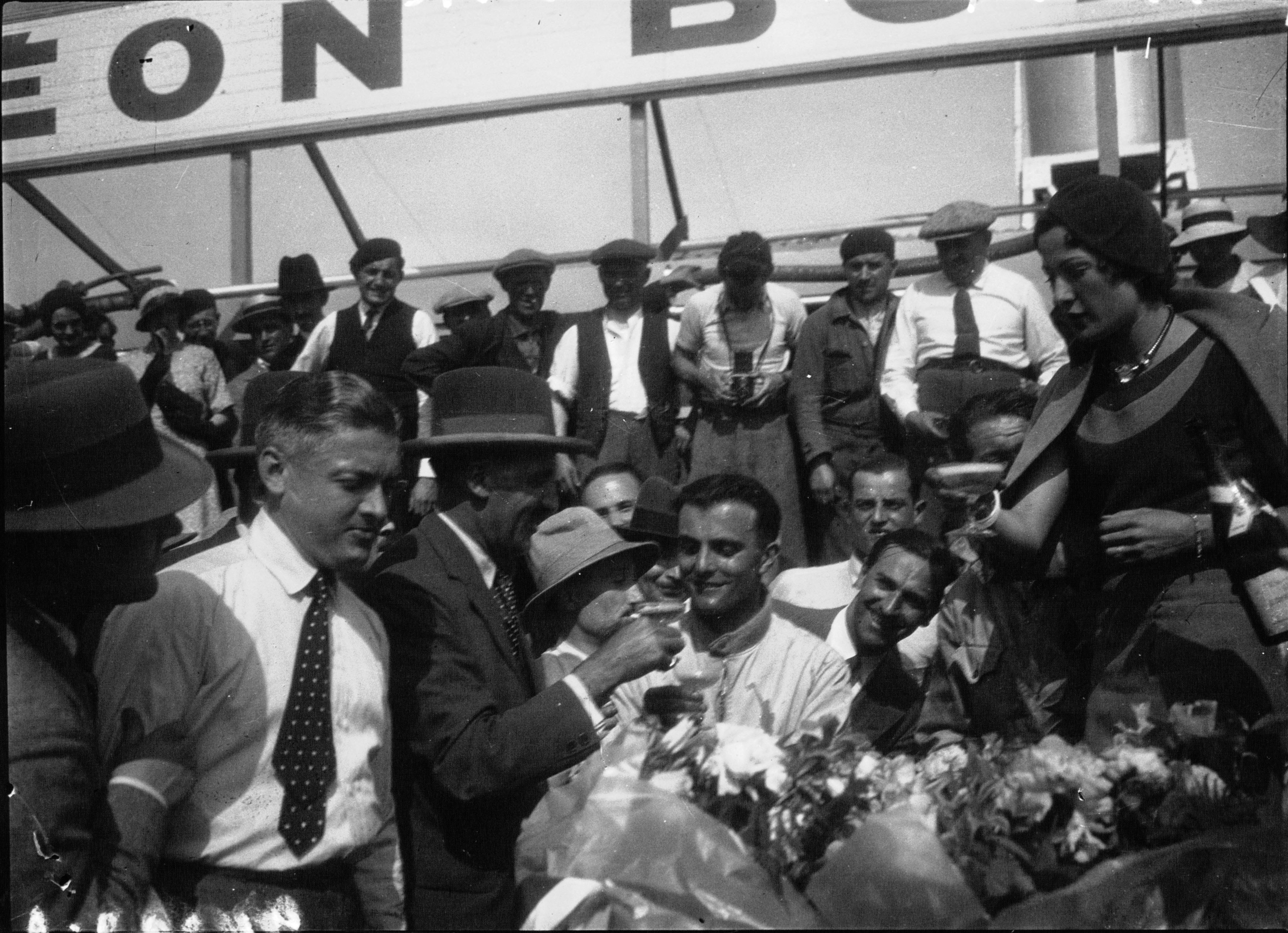
Winners Raymond Sommer and Luigi Chinetti

The Talbot started its final, and target, lap with just eight minutes to spare and finished third, a distant 36 laps (nearly 500 km) further back. Just a lap behind, in fourth, was the 2-litre Alfa Romeo of Odette Siko. Taking the 2-litre class win, to date this is still the highest finish at Le Mans by a female driver. Their 179 laps had not overtaken the Czaykowski Bugatti that had retired three hours earlier.

Fifth was the Newsome/Widengren Aston Martin which had a good run after its initial fuel hiccups. It beat home the Bugatti of Sébilleau/Delaroche to win the 1.5-litre class. Because of the speed of the new circuit layout, they won at a record speed but actually covered 60 km less than the class-winning Aston the previous year.

In the end the Bertelli/Briscoll Aston Martin beat its target distance by 20 laps, only placing it 7th on the Index of Performance, but about 5 laps further than the Caban needed to win the Biennial Cup. After a reliable run the French special had been delayed near the end with an intermittent misfire.

It was the last time that two-time winner, Sir Tim Birkin, would be at Le Mans. In May the next year he burnt his arm on his exhaust pipe at the Tripoli Grand Prix. The wound turned septic and he died of septicaemia a week after the 1933 Le Mans race, aged 36.

It was an inauspicious result for debutantes Citroën and Alta, and neither appeared at Le Mans again. Nor did Stutz or Caban after more successful results. It was also the last race for a while for Mercedes-Benz as they put their focus on Grand Prix racing. They would be away for two decades until returning in the 1950s

For finishing third in three consecutive races, the ACO awarded Arthur Fox a special gold medal, perhaps compensating for the Talbot's tribulations. However, in a final insult, upon returning to England, the Customs department charged him 30% import duty on the medal.

This year was arguably one of the most dominant displays by a single manufacturer – with Alfa Romeo winning every major European racing prize in 1932. The 8C, in its sports or racing guises, aside from this Le Mans victory also won the Targa Florio, Mille Miglia, Spa 24-hours and Monaco GP; while the Tipo B won the other Grand Epreuves of the year at France, Germany and Italy. Alfa Romeo drivers finished 1-2-3 in the European Championship, headed by Tazio Nuvolari. Yet, despite their racing successes, economic circumstances forced both Alfa Romeo and Talbot to withdraw from motor-racing at the end of the year.

== Official results ==
=== Finishers ===
Results taken from Quentin Spurring's book, officially licensed by the ACO Class Winners are in Bold text.

Pos	Class	No.	Team	Drivers	Chassis	Engine	Tyre	Target distance*	Laps
1	**5.0****	**8**	**(France) R. Sommer** (private entrant)	**(France) Raymond Sommer** **(Italy) Luigi Chinetti**	Alfa Romeo 8C-2300 MM	Alfa Romeo 2.34L S8 supercharged	E	181	218
2	5.0 **	11	(Italy) S.A. Alfa Romeo	(Italy) Franco Cortese (Italy) Giovanni Battista Guidotti	Alfa Romeo 8C-2300 LM	Alfa Romeo 2.34L S8 supercharged	D	181	216
3	**3.0**	**6**	**(United Kingdom) Arthur W. Fox**	**(United Kingdom) Brian Lewis, Baron Essendon** **(United Kingdom) Tim Rose-Richards**	Talbot AV105	Talbot 3.0L S6	D	180 [B]	180
4	**2.0**	**18**	**(France) O. Siko** (private entrant)	**(France) Odette Siko** **(France) "Sabipa" (Louis Charavel)**	Alfa Romeo 6C-1750 SS	Alfa Romeo 1746cc S8 supercharged	D	167	179
5	**1.5**	**20**	**(United Kingdom) Aston Martin Ltd**	**(United Kingdom) Sammy Newsome** **(Sweden) Henken Widengren**	Aston Martin 1½ Le Mans	Aston Martin 1495cc S4	D	148	174
6	1.5	23	(France) J. Sébilleau (private entrant)	(France) Jean Sébilleau (France) Georges Delaroche	Bugatti Type 37	Bugatti 1496cc S4	M	149	172
7	1.5	21	(United Kingdom) Aston Martin Ltd.	(United Kingdom) Augustus "Bert" Bertelli (United Kingdom) Pat Driscoll	Aston Martin 1½ Le Mans	Aston Martin 1495cc S4	D	148 [B]	168
8	1.5	29	(France) Équipe de l'Ours	(France) Clément-Auguste Martin (France) Auguste Bodoignet	Amilcar CO Spéciale Martin	Amilcar 1092cc S6	E	133	151
9	1.5	26	(France) Roger Labric	(France) Roger Labric (France) Yves Giraud-Cabantous	Caban Spéciale	Ruby 1098cc S4	D	133 [B]	146

=== Did Not Finish ===
Pos	Class	No	Team	Drivers	Chassis	Engine	Tyre	Target distance*	Laps	Reason
DNF	3.0	16	(Poland) S. Czaykowski (private entrant)	(Poland) Count Stanisław Czaykowski (France) Ernest Friderich	Bugatti Type 40/55	Bugatti 2.26L S8 supercharged	D	180	180	engine (21 hr)
DNF	1.5	28	(France) J.-É. Vernet (private entrant)	(France) Just-Émile Vernet (France) Fernand Vallon	Salmson GS Spéciale	Salmson 1092cc S4	D	133	111	clutch (~19hr)
DNF	5.0 **	9	(United Kingdom) Earl Howe (private entrant)	(United Kingdom) Francis Curzon, Earl Howe (United Kingdom) Sir Henry Birkin	Alfa Romeo 8C-2300 LM	Alfa Romeo 2.34L S8 supercharged	D	181 [B]	110	engine (~13 hr)
DNF	2.0**	24	(France) C. Druck (private entrant)	(France) Charles Druck (France) Lucien Virlouvet	Bugatti Type 40	Bugatti 1496cc S4 supercharged	D	160	98	accident (~14 hr)
DNF	1.0**	32	(United Kingdom) F. Samuelson (private entrant)	(United Kingdom) Francis Samuelson (United Kingdom) Norman Black	MG C-type Midget	MG 746cc S4	D	129	57	fuel tank (9 hr)
DNF	1.5	22	(United Kingdom) Aston Martin Ltd.	(United Kingdom) Kenneth Peacock (United Kingdom) Jack Bezzant	Aston Martin 1½ Le Mans	Aston Martin 1495cc S4	D	148	53	engine (8 hr)
DNF	5.0 **	12	(France) P.-L. Dreyfus (private entrant)	(France) Pierre-Louis Dreyfus (France) Antoine Schumann	Alfa Romeo 8C-2300 LM	Alfa Romeo 2.34L S8 supercharged	D	181	25	accident (3 hr)
DNF	3.0	15	(France) G. Bouriat (private entrant)	(France) Guy Bouriat (Monaco) Louis Chiron	Bugatti Type 40/55	Bugatti 2.26L S8 supercharged	D	180	23	fuel tank (3 hr)
DNF	5.0 **	10	(Italy) S.A. Alfa Romeo	(Italy) Ferdinando Minoia (Italy) Carlo Canavesi	Alfa Romeo 8C-2300 LM	Alfa Romeo 2.34L S8 supercharged	D	180	22	accident (2 hr)
DNF	8.0	1	(France) H. Stoffel (private entrant)	(France) Marcel Foucret (France) Paul Foucret	Mercedes-Benz SSK	Mercedes-Benz 7.1L S6 supercharged	D	192	22	engine (4 hr)
DNF	8.0	3	(France) É. Brisson (private entrant)	(France) Édouard Brisson (Italy) Joseph Cattaneo	Stutz Model M Blackhawk	Stutz 5.3L S8	D	192	19	accident (2 hr)
DNF	5.0 **	14	(Russia) Prince Dimitri; Djordjadze (private entrant)	(Italy) Attilio Marinoni (Italy) Angelo Guatta	Alfa Romeo 8C-2300 MM	Alfa Romeo 2.34L S8 supercharged	D	181	14	accident (3 hr)
DNF	1.5	27	(France) Roger Labric	(France) Gustave Duverne (France) Georges Boréal	BNC Type 527 Sport	Ruby 1093cc S4	D	133 [B]	9	engine (1 hr)
DNF	1.5	30	(United Kingdom) J.L. Ford (private entrant)	(United Kingdom) John Ludovic Ford (United Kingdom) Maurice Baumer	Alta Sports	Alta 1074cc S4	D	132	6	clutch (2 hr)
DNF	1.5	25	(France) J. Danne (private entrant)	(France) Jean Danne (France) Jacques Gergaud	Rally NCP	Salmson 1362cc S4	E	144	6	electrics (1 hr)
DNF	2.0	19	(France) H. de la Sayette (private entrant)	(France) Henri de la Sayette (France) Charles Wolf	Citroën Type C4 Spéciale	Citroën 1539cc S4	D	147?	3	electrics (1 hr)
DNF	8.0**	5	(France) J. Trévoux (private entrant)	(France) Jean Trévoux (France) "Mary" (Jean Brousselet)	Bentley 4½ "Blower"	Bentley 4.4L S6 supercharged	D	193	1	accident (1 hr)
Sources:

- Note *: [B]= car also entered in the 1931-32 Biennial Cup.
- Note **: equivalent class for supercharging, with x1.33 modifier to engine capacity.

=== Did Not Start ===
Pos	Class	No	Team	Drivers	Chassis	Engine	Reason
DNA	8.0	2	(Russia) V. Tatarinoff (private entrant)		Mercedes-Benz SSK	Mercedes-Benz 7.1L S6 supercharged	Did not arrive
DNA	8.0		(Russia) Prince Dimitri; Djordjadze (private entrant)		Mercedes-Benz SSK	Mercedes-Benz 7.1L S6 supercharged	Did not arrive
DNA	5.0	4	(France) R. Sommer (private entrant)		Chrysler CD Eight	Chrysler 4.9L S8	Did not arrive
DNA	5.0		(France) . Lebas		Ford Model B	Ford 3.3L S4	Did not arrive
DNA	3.0	7	(United Kingdom) Robert I. Nicholl		Talbot AV105	Talbot 3.0L S6	Did not arrive
DNA	750	31	(United Kingdom) Hon. Mrs J. Chetwynd (private entrant)	(United Kingdom) Hon. Joan Chetwynd	MG Midget C-type	MG 746cc S4	Did not arrive
DNA	1.0	33	(France) A. de Choquese		GAR 750	GAR 745cc S4 supercharged	Did not arrive

=== 1932 Index of Performance ===
Pos	1931-32 Biennial Cup	Class	No.	Team	Drivers	Chassis	Index Result
1	-	5.0	8	(France) R. Sommer (private entrant)	(France) Raymond Sommer (Italy) Luigi Chinetti	Alfa Romeo 8C-2300 MM	1.210
2	-	5.0	11	(Italy) S.A. Alfa Romeo	(Italy) Franco Cortese (Italy) Giovanni Battista Guidotti	Alfa Romeo 8C-2300 LM	1.201
3	-	1.5	20	(United Kingdom) Aston Martin Ltd	(United Kingdom) Sammy Newsome (Sweden) Henken Widengren	Aston Martin 1½ Le Mans	1.177
4	-	1.5	23	(France) J. Sébilleau (private entrant)	(France) Jean Sébilleau (France) Georges Delaroche	Bugatti Type 37	1.164
5	-	1.1	29	(France) Équipe de l'Ours	(France) Clément-Auguste Martin (France) Auguste Bodoignet	Amilcar CO Spéciale Martin	1.146
6	1st	1.5	21	(United Kingdom) Aston Martin Ltd	(United Kingdom) Augustus "Bert" Bertelli (United Kingdom) Pat Driscoll	Aston Martin 1½ Le Mans	1.137
7	2nd	1.1	26	(France) Roger Labric	(France) Roger Labric (France) Yves Giraud-Cabantous	Caban Spéciale	1.109
8	-	2.0	18	(France) O. Siko (private entrant)	(France) Odette Siko (France) "Sabipa" (Louis Charavel)	Alfa Romeo 6C-1750 SS	1.079
9	3rd	3.0	6	(United Kingdom) Arthur W. Fox	(United Kingdom) Brian Lewis, Baron Essendon (United Kingdom) Tim Rose-Richards	Talbot AV105	1.010

- Note: A score of 1.00 means meeting the minimum distance for the car, and a higher score is exceeding the nominal target distance.

=== Class Winners ===
Class	Winning car	Winning drivers
Over 5-litre	no finishers	
3 to 5-litre	#8 Alfa Romeo 8C-2300 MM	Sommer / Chinetti
2 to 3-litre	#6 Talbot AV105	Lewis / Rose-Richards
1500 to 2000cc	#18 Alfa Romeo 6C-1750 SS	Siko / "Sabipa" *
1000 to 1500cc	#20 Aston Martin 1½ Le Mans	Newsome / Widengren *
Up to 1000cc	no finishers	
Note *: setting a new class distance record.

=== Statistics ===
- Fastest Lap – F. Minoia, #10 Alfa Romeo 8C-2300 LM – 5:41secs; 142.44 km/h (88.51 mph)
- Winning Distance – 2,954.04 km (1,835.56 mi)
- Winner's Average Speed – 123.08 km/h (76.48 mph)
