= 1933 24 Hours of Le Mans =

11th 24 Hours of Le Mans endurance race

Previous: 1932	Next: 1934
Index: Races | Winners

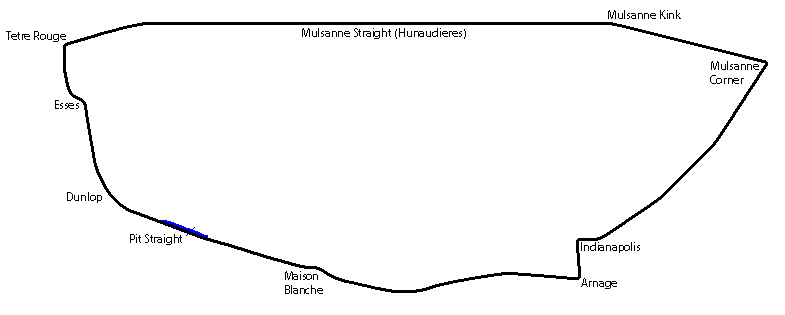
Le Mans in 1933

The 1933 24 Hours of Le Mans was the 11th Grand Prix of Endurance. It took place at the Circuit de la Sarthe on 17 and 18 June 1933. Up against five strong privateer entries from Alfa Romeo, the opposition looked fairly weak, mostly being of 1920s vintage. There was a strong British contingent in the smaller classes. The big drawcard was the presence of top European drivers Louis Chiron and Tazio Nuvolari. The current European champion was paired with one of the previous year's winners, Raymond Sommer.

From the start, the Italian cars set a strong pace. Sommer broke the track-record several times building a two-minute lead over the Alfas of Chiron, Lewis, Chinetti and Moll. He had lapped the rest of the field by the end of the second hour. Chiron was delayed by an intransigent starter unit, but his co-driver Franco Cortese drove hard to bring the car back up to second going into the night. Most of the other large-engine contenders had fallen away, allowing Odette Siko in a 1.8-litre supercharged Alfa Romeo to move up to fifth. The British teams of Aston Martin, Riley and MG filled out the back end of the top-10.

A processional first half of the race was turned on its head come the dawn on Sunday when Nuvolari brought the leading Alfa in with fender damage and a leaking fuel-tank. The two-lap lead they had built up was lost in the quarter-hour needed for repairs. The Chiron and Chinetti cars then swapped the lead for the next two hours in close, exciting racing. At 7am, a short rain-shower caused Odette Siko to have a serious accident on the fast approach to Indianapolis corner. The impact with trees caused the car to be destroyed, but the driver only sustained light injuries.

After avoiding driving during the night, Nuvolari was back in front by 9am. Soon after, Cortese crashed when a front wheel bearing collapsed. With the closest opposition gone, what could have been a simple run to the finish was anything but. When Sommer pitted the car at midday, their lead was again wiped with repairs to the radiator, brakes and worsening fuel-leak. Mechanics used chewing-gum to plug the crack. Nuvolari would then overtake the smooth-running Chinetti/Gunzberg car only to have to stop to check the fuel-tank and lose the lead again. By the time of the final stops, with an hour to go, the two cars were less than a minute apart. Going onto the last lap, the superior speed of Nuvolari's car allowed him to pass on the back straight, only to lose it again under braking at the Mulsanne corner. Then Chinetti missed a gear at Arnage and Nuvolari was through again. When Chinetti was baulked by slow traffic coming out of White House it gave Nuvolari the clear run to the flag, to win by just 400 meters. The margin of victory for this race was estimated at a 9.5 seconds difference, and remains one of the narrowest racing finishes at Le Mans – excluding the formation finishes of later years.

Third, eight laps back, was the British-entered Alfa Romeo of Lewis/Rose-Richards. The small 1.1-litre Riley of Peacock/van der Becke finished in fourth place. Their performance gave them a solid margin for winning the lucrative Index of Performance prize.

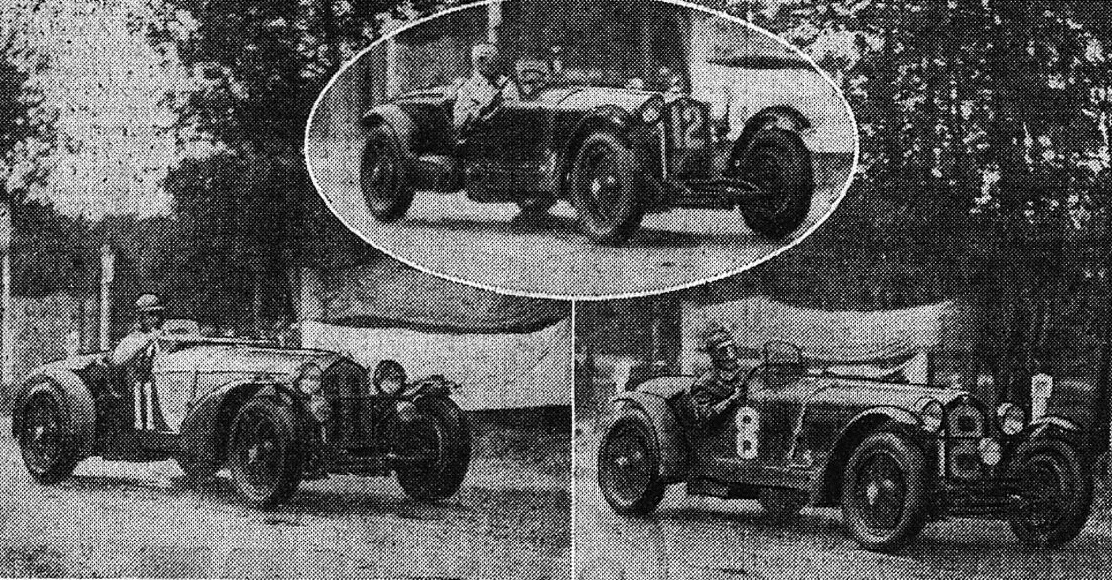
Race podium: Alfa Romeo 1st, 2nd and 3rd

== Regulations and Organisation ==
After the major circuit changes in the previous year, the Automobile Club de l'Ouest (ACO) continued with further improvements to the track. A yellow centre-line was painted down the Hunaudières Straight and reflective markers, forerunners of cat's eye reflectors, were put on the approach to all the corners to assist during night driving.

A further addition to the facilities was from the city of Le Mans. A small chapel was built to allow spectators to attend mass on the Sunday morning.

In line with the ACO's policy to alternate fuel supplier, this year the contract was with Shell, who offered four fuel choices: its regular fuel, a premium grade, 100% benzole and a 70/30 blend of the premium with benzole. The ACO also revised the equivalence factor for supercharged engines up to x1.4 from the x1.33 set the previous year. Finally, they also updated some of the class distance-targets, particularly for the smaller engines.

Engine size	1932 Minimum distance	1933 Minimum distance	Average speed	Equivalent laps
4000cc+	2,600 km (1,600 mi)	2,600 km (1,600 mi)	108.3 km/h (67.3 mph)	192.7 laps
4000cc	2,550 km (1,580 mi)	2,500 km (1,600 mi)	104.2 km/h (64.7 mph)	185.3 laps
3000cc	2,424 km (1,506 mi)	2,325 km (1,445 mi)	96.9 km/h (60.2 mph)	172.3 laps
1500cc	2,000 km (1,200 mi)	2,000 km (1,200 mi)	83.3 km/h (51.8 mph)	148.2 laps
1000cc	1,700 km (1,100 mi)	1,825 km (1,134 mi)	76.0 km/h (47.2 mph)	135.3 laps
750cc	1,550 km (960 mi)	1,580 km (980 mi)	65.3 km/h (40.6 mph)	117.1 laps

== Entries ==
The gradual economic recovery was signalled with a good initial list of 41 entries. However, a record thirteen entries were withdrawn before race-week. The ongoing struggles for the automotive industry were reflected by the fact that there were only four works teams present – a single French Tracta, as well three British Aston Martins, a Riley and a new Singer – none of which were of a pace to challenge for outright victory. This represented a vantage for the squadron of privateer Alfa Romeos.

From the finishers in the 1932 race there were eight cars eligible for the Biennial Cup. Three Italian Alfa Romeos squared up against two Aston Martins and a Riley from Great Britain, and a Lorraine-Dietrich and Amilcar from France.

Category	Entries	Classes
Large-sized engines	14 / 9	over 3-litre
Medium-sized engines	14 / 9	1.1 to 3-litre
Small-sized engines	13 / 11	up to 1.1-litre
Total entrants	40 / 29	

- Note: The first number is the number of entries, the second the number who started.

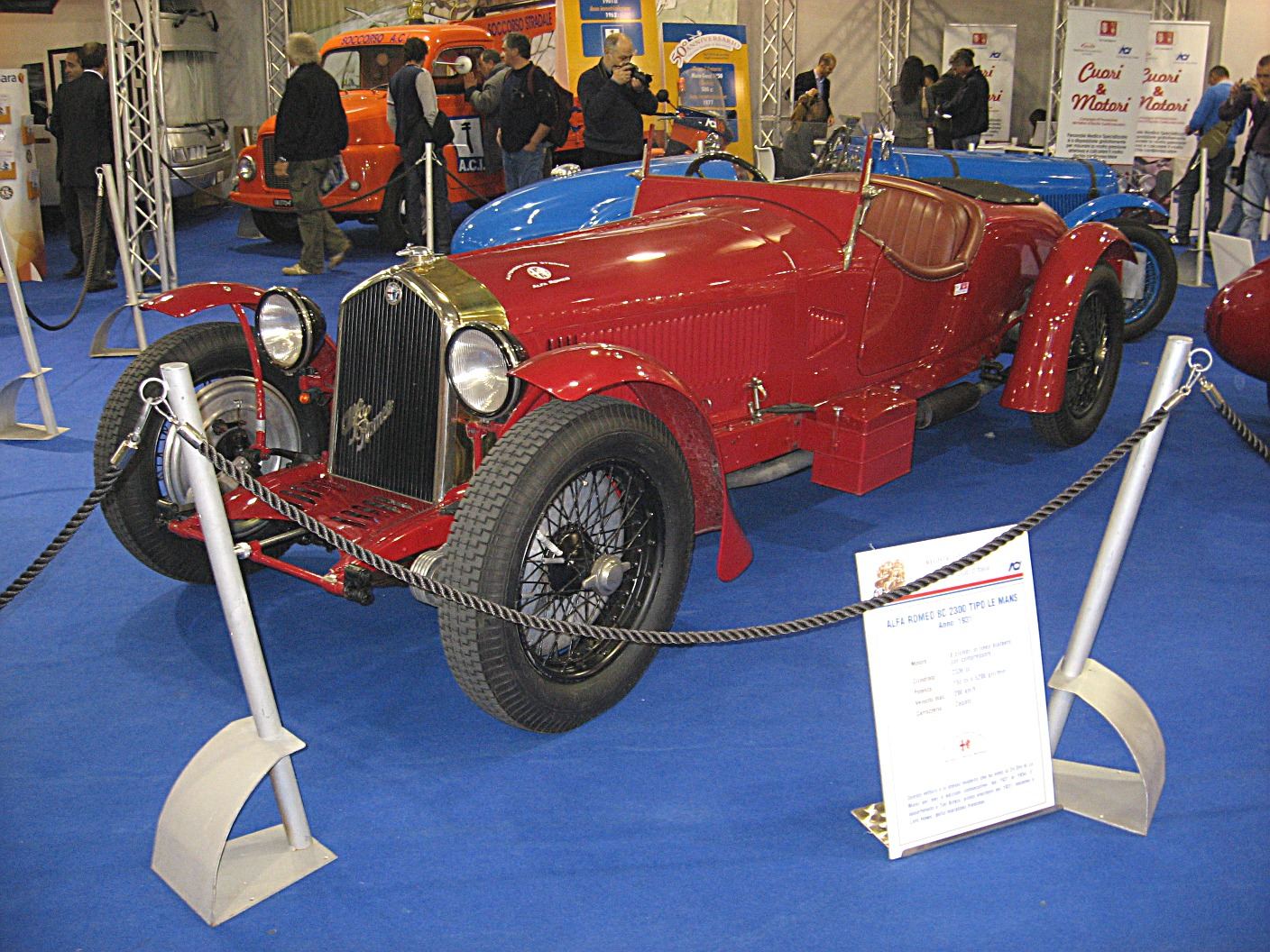
Alfa Romeo 8C-2300

At the end of 1932, the new government-appointed CEO of Alfa Romeo, Ugo Gobbato, had withdrawn the works team from racing. The privateers ensured a strong presence, and the marque was the best represented in the entry list, with 9 cars. The winners of the previous year, Raymond Sommer and Luigi Chinetti, were the organisers for Alfa racing in France. This year they were in separate cars: Sommer ran the Mille Miglia 4-seater version, again fitted with an oversized fuel tank that would allow 27 laps between refills. He scored a coup getting the current European Champion, Tazio Nuvolari, as his co-driver. Released from Scuderia Ferrari for the event, he had won the Mille Miglia earlier in the year and also came with support from Pirelli tyres. Chinetti, meanwhile, was hired by wealthy Russian émigré Philippe de Gunzberg to prepare and co-drive his corto 8C. A keen amateur racer, de Gunzberg raced under the pseudonym of "Philippe Varent". Chinetti was offered a bonus 60000 francs if they won the race. Louis Chiron was also back, with an 8C-2300 Le Mans, with a 4-seater lungo (long) touring body. This year he had formed a new racing team with Rudolf Caracciola. But the German ace had broken his leg at Monaco early in the season and for Le Mans Chiron was joined by former works driver Franco Cortese who had finished second at the Mille Miglia.

There were three British Alfa entries, though only one arrived (Earl Howe, had cut his eye the week before at the French Grand Prix). With Talbot also withdrawing from motorsport, this year Arthur Fox entered an 8C tourer for his regular drivers Brian Lewis, Baron Essendon and Tim Rose-Richards. The other 8C was entered by wealthy Parisian banker, Pierre Louis-Dreyfus. He had crashed this car in last year's race, but it had been repaired and recently been sold to the up-and-coming star, French-Algerian Guy Moll. He was joined by his compatriot, former Amilcar driver Guy Cloitre, as his co-driver.

Two, smaller, 6-cylinder Alfa Romeos were also entered, running in the 3-litre class. Miss Odette Siko made headlines the previous year finishing fourth, and she returned with Louis Charavel as her co-driver. They again ran their 1768cc supercharged SS model, while in a slightly smaller 1742cc GS saloon version was fellow Frenchman André Rousseau.

Alfa Romeo's competition for outright honours was expected to come from Bugatti. Six cars were entered but only two arrived for scrutineering. Guy Bouriat entered one of the former works Type 50 with its big 5-litre supercharged straight-8 engine. He was killed a month before Le Mans in the Picardy Grand Prix. So, his regular co-driver, Pierre Bussienne, was joined by another former E.H.P. works driver, Marie Desprez. The other was the first sports-car race for the new, unsupercharged 1.5-litre Type 51A. It was entered by the Polish émigré Count Stanisław Czaykowski, a regular Grand Prix racer in Bugattis and he teamed up with Jean Gaupillat, another privateer Bugatti driver.

The biggest car in the race was an unexpected entry – the Duesenberg Model J was one of the most exclusive cars in the world. In 1932 the supercharged Model SJ was unveiled. The mighty 6.9-litre straight-8 twin-cam engine was based on the very successful racing engine, and with supercharging it put out 320bhp with a top speed of 215kp/h (135mph). Only 36 were built, including one sold to Prince Nicholas von Hohenzollern-Sigmaringen who was an exiled member of the Romanian royal family. He got the Parisian luxury-car dealer Joseph Cattaneo as a co-driver and to prepare the car. This included more suitable bodywork for racing. Cattaneo had twice previously been entered as the co-driver in Édouard Brisson's Stutz but each time the car was retired before he got to drive.

The other two large cars in the field were returning veterans of the 1920s. Racing journalist Roger Labric came back with the Lorraine-Dietrich he had entered two years earlier, this time driving it himself, using the Biennial Cup entry he had earned finishing in a small Caban. Meanwhile, rally specialist Jean Trévoux repaired his supercharged "Blower" Bentley that he had crashed early in the 1932 race. He was partnered by fellow French rally-driver Louis Gas.

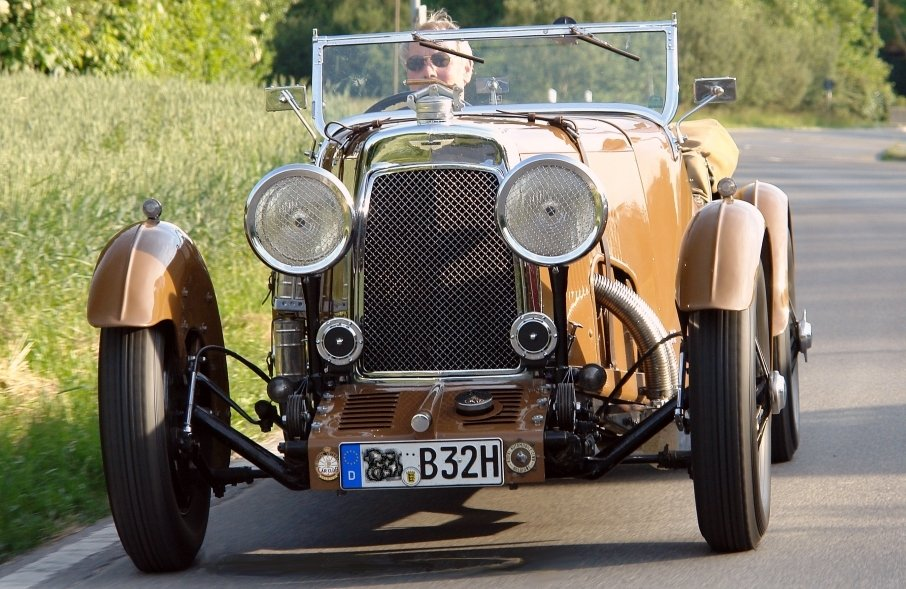
1932 Aston Martin International

Frenchman Jean Danne returned with his Rally NCP, but this time replaced the 1.4-litre Salmson normally-aspirated engine with a supercharged 1.3-litre version. The equivalence factor put him in the 2-litre class whose sole other entry was the SARA SP7 Spéciale. That privateer effort took the 1927 SP7 model and gave it modified bodywork and a slightly bigger 1.8-litre engine. The team also got former SARA-team regulars Gaston Mottet and André Marandet as their drivers.

The supercharging equivalence and a 1.0-litre lower limit meant the 1.5-litre class was a crowded affair. Aston Martin had been bought out by shipping millionaire Sir Arthur Sutherland, giving it financial security. The works team arrived with three cars including a pair of the two-door 'Le Mans' variant to contest the Biennial Cup. Technical Director and designer "Bert" Bertelli ran with former Le Mans winner and "Autocar" journalist Sammy Davis, while the other car had team regulars Pat Driscoll and Clifton Penn-Hughes. The 4-seater International that had won its class, finishing fifth the previous year, had been sold to "Mort" Morris-Goodall, who ran it as a works car with Elsie "Bill" Wisdom.

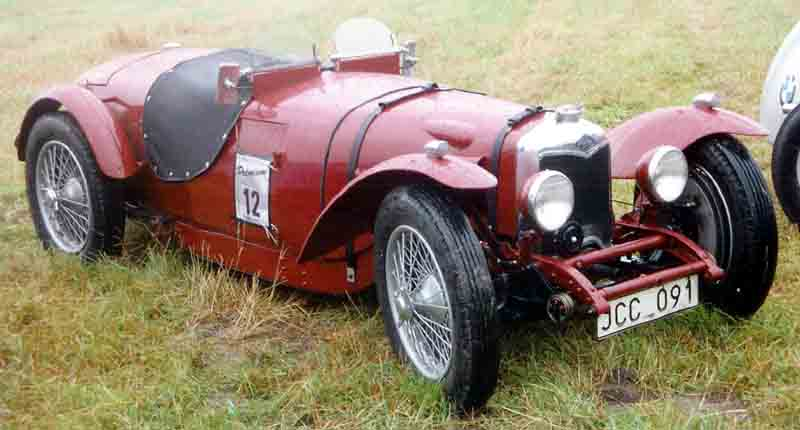
Riley Nine Brooklands

The English manufacturer Riley made its first appearance at le Mans this year. It had already achieved considerable success in the British endurance handicap races with the Riley Nine "Brooklands" roadster. The advanced 1.1-litre twin-cam engine put out 50 bhp. Three cars were prepared for Le Mans though only two arrived. The first was a works entry driven by Ken Peacock and "Bill" van der Becke, while Le Mans regular Jean Sébilleau had a French privateer entry.

For the third time, Just-Émile Vernet and Fernand Vallon raced together, again with their seven-year old Salmson GSS. As they were going to be running in the 1.5-litre class they decided to put a supercharger on the 1.1-litre engine. Two weeks earlier, in the Bol d'Or 24-hour race, they had brought the car home in second - giving them confidence to take on the Astons. Conversely, the unsupercharged 1.1-litre BNC 527 of the Alin brothers was going to have a much harder time keeping up.

After the disbursement of the Amilcar racing stable the previous year, their Parisian distributor, Clément-Auguste Martin bought the remaining MCO models from José Scaron for his Équipe de l'Ours team. Along with Amilcar engineering director (and racer) Maurice Mestivier, he set about updating them for further racing. Jean de Gavardie had won the Bol d'Or a fortnight previous when the team had entered seven cars. Three variants were presented for Le Mans. De Gavardie and his brother had his successful 1094cc 6-cylinder car, while Buquet/Clouet ran a 1074cc 4-cylinder one. Martin himself ran his with a modified Amilcar 990cc sidevalve 4-cylinder engine in the 1-litre class.

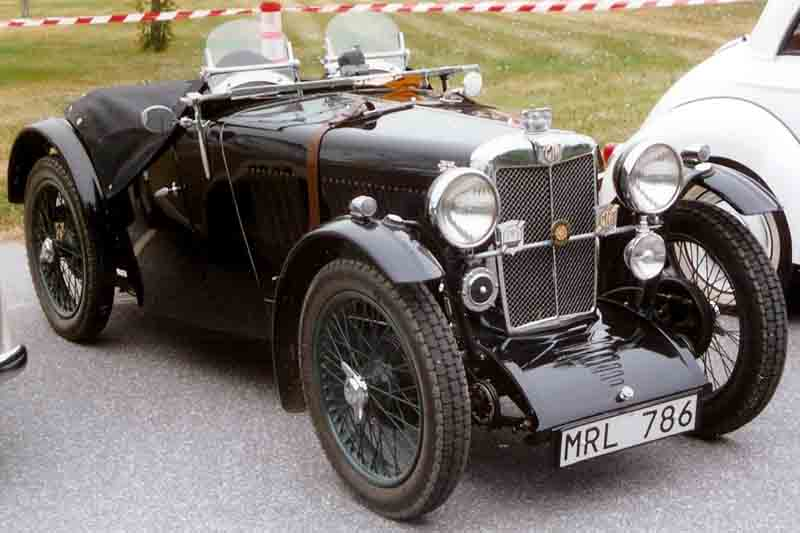
MG J-type

Of the four MGs entered, two arrived at scrutineering. John Ludovic Ford raced a supercharged C-type Midget. When Norman Black's entry was cancelled, Gordon Hendy used it to bring one of the new J-series cars. This J3, with its supercharged 746cc engine, had recently set a 24-hour distance record for its class at Montlhéry. Both owners paid the expenses of works mechanics to attend and assist in the race. Their competition would come from a works Tracta, making a rare racing appearance, and the small Amilcar.

Another British firm debuting at Le Mans was Singer. Like many, it was originally a bicycle manufacturer but had been building cars since the turn of the century. By the end of the 1920s it was Great Britain's third largest car company. The Singer Nine was introduced in 1932, and in October came a Sports version: a 4-seater convertible with a twin-carburettor 972cc engine uprated to produce 31 bhp. The car was soon popular in rallies and British racing events. Stanley Barnes, running the racing department for the company, bought one to Le Mans with a view to run the 24 hours to qualify for the Biennial Cup. He raced it personally, with the team's lead driver Alf Langley.

The smallest car in the field was an Austin 7 hybrid. The basic car was the mainstay of the Austin Motor Company with nearly 300,000 having been built already. One had previously been raced at Le Mans by Eric Gordon England in the 1925 race. The car that was entered started off as a works sporting prototype in 1929. Bought by Charles Metchim a year later, he often raced it in Britain, and he resolved to have the first car in the 750cc class to complete the Le Mans race. Prepared by the works garage it was given the latest race-tuned engine.

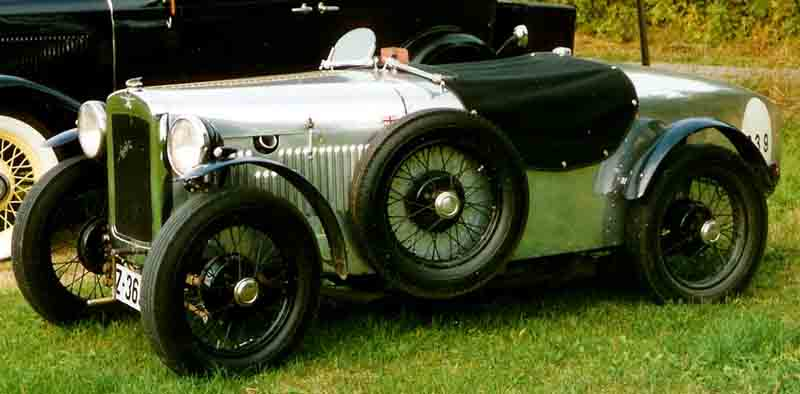
Austin Seven Racer

== Practice and Pre-Race ==
In practice the night before the race, the Bentley developed clutch problems. However, Jean Chassagne, the Le Mans veteran with Bentley, Aries and Sunbeam, was on-hand and able to help get the car repaired and ready to take the start.

There would be added interest in the relative performance of tyres. Most cars were running on Dunlops, while Nuvolari bought Italian Pirellis for Sommer's Alfa, and Chiron's Alfa and Danne's Rally ran on Belgian Engleberts.

== Race ==
=== Start ===
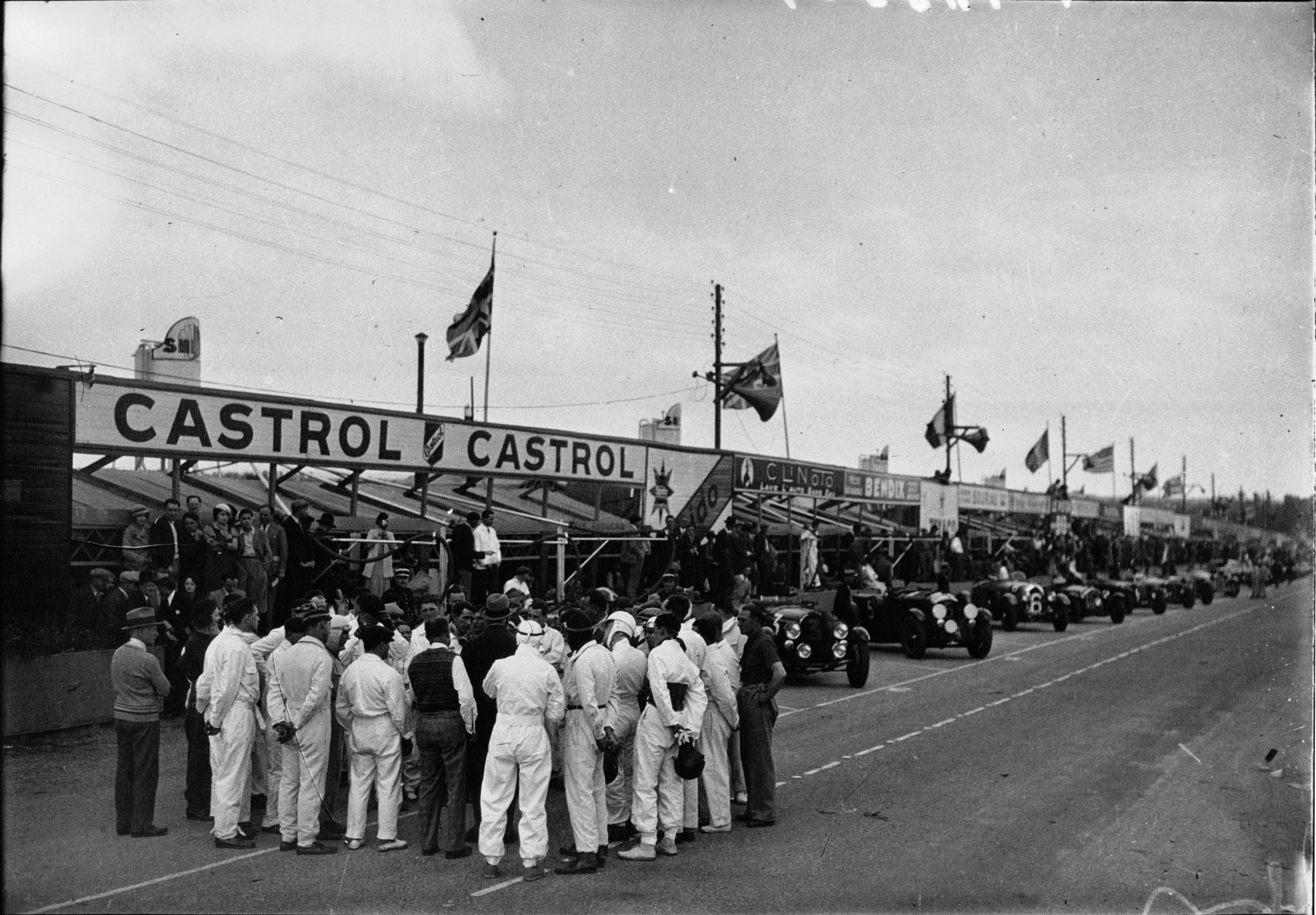
Drivers before the start

On a fine Saturday, 50 000 people flocked to the circuit. The honorary starter this year was Col Lindsey Lloyd, vice-president of the British Auto Club, and at the flagfall the quickest car away was the Alfa Romeo of Brian Lewis. He was soon overhauled and at the end of the first lap, it was the Alfas of Sommer, Chiron, Chinetti, Lewis and Moll followed by the Duesenberg, Bugatti and Bentley. By the end of the second lap, Sommer was lapping the little Austin. He continued to push hard, breaking "Nando" Minoia's lap record nine times by the end of the first hour. Chiron was two minutes behind, with a gap back to Lewis, Chinetti and Moll. Further back were Tarante (Bugatti), Trévoux (Bentley), Prince Nicholas (Duesenberg), Mme Siko in the smaller Alfa, and Driscoll rounding out the top-10 in the first of the Astons.

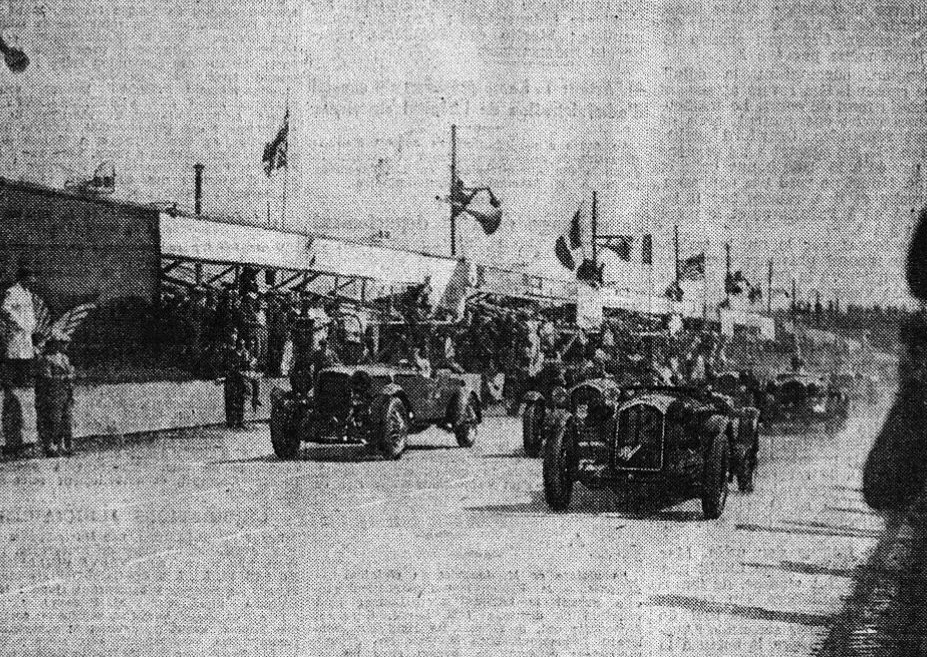
Race start, Lewis in Alfa #12

By the end of the second hour, Sommer had lapped all the cars up to the other three Alfas. Most cars pitted after the requisite minimum of 24 laps but Sommer pitted after about 2½ hours and 27 laps, handing over to crowd-favourite Nuvolari. Chiron's pitstop was delayed by a jammed starter motor so at 7pm Nuvolari held a 4-minute lead over the nearest competition. The co-drivers had taken over and Gunzberg was second ahead of Rose-Richards, Cloitre, Cattaneo (finally getting a drive) in the Duesenberg, and Cortese rushing to make up his lost time. On his out-lap after taking over the Bentley, Louis Gas misjudged his braking at the Mulsanne corner and ploughed straight through the fencing hitting a tree. Bleeding from smacking his head on the steering wheel in the impact, he limped back to the pits, but the front axle was too bent to continue.

At the third hour Nuvolari had done 31 laps and extended his lead to Gunzberg. Relishing his chance for a drive, Cattaneo had pulled the Duesenberg up to fifth. Cortese was sixth, making up the time from the pit delay. Penn-Hughes had taken over the leading Aston Martin, still running tenth, while van der Becke had the small Riley in eleventh. Positions remained fairly static for the last hours of daylight, although Cortese had charged his way back up to fourth.

=== Night ===
Just as night was falling the Duesenberg was disqualified for coming in for its first fuel-stop one lap too early. This moved the Bugatti of Bussienne/Desprez up to fifth. The other Bugatti had to retire when its battery went flat and could not power the headlamps. Another racer having problems with its battery was John Ford's C-type MG. The dynamo was not recharging the battery, so to save power they drove without the lights on until the ACO officials warned them they risked disqualification. Thereafter they only put them on coming out of the White House corner to the pit straight and tried to follow other cars whenever possible. They survived without incident, to themselves or others, until dawn and the danger had passed.

During the evening, the public address announced to the spectators that Sommer and Nuvolari had covered the first 500km faster than Giuseppe Campari had done in the French Grand Prix the week before at Montlhéry.

Through the night, the cars had settled into a regular order: Sommer had a two-lap lead over Chiron/Cortese (who had fought back up to second) and Chinetti/Gunzberg with a further two laps back to Lewis/Rose-Richards. Guy Moll's Alfa Romeo had been running well, getting as high as fourth. But constant vibration broke the terminals on the battery, stopping his co-driver Cloitre out on the circuit. When Moll tried to take a new fuse out to the car, he was spotted by the officials and the car had to be disqualified. At 2am Sammy Davis, running well in the top-10, brought his Aston Martin into the pits with front suspension issues and an hour was spent replacing the springs. The big Bugatti, that had been running fifth, started having water pump issues and it lost a lot of time in the pits.

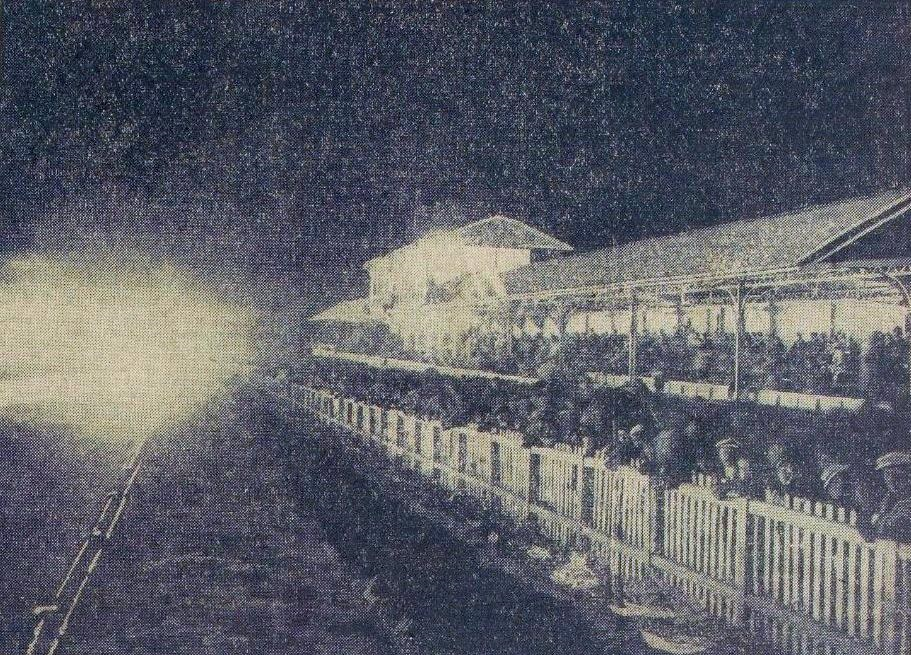
The pit straight grandstands at night

Nuvolari preferred not driving at night, so Sommer continued driving in the dark until just before dawn. At the halfway mark, the four Alfas were still well out in front with Sommer having done 118 laps. The smaller Siko/Charavel Alfa had moved past the stationary Bugatti into fifth with Driscoll's Aston Martin in seventh ahead of the Riley in eighth with twenty cars still on-track.

=== Morning ===
If the spectators thought the Saturday racing was routine the Sunday proved to be one of the most thrilling days of endurance motor-racing. At 4.30am, as dawn was breaking and early into his stint, Nuvolari bought the lead Alfa in with a broken fender and leaking petrol. The quarter-hour needed to fix it cost them two laps and allowed the other Alfas to overtake them. The lead was then strongly contested between the Alfas of Chiron/Cortese and Chinetti/Gunzberg, with each car taking an advantage depending on their respective pit cycles.

At 6 am the Bugatti, having dropped to eighth and 14 laps in arrears, came to the pits in a cloud of steam and smoke so large it was mistakenly thought to be on fire. Just before 7 am, a brief shower swept the track. Odette Siko was caught out on the fast approach to Indianapolis. Going off the road she was flung out as the car ricocheted off the trees so violently that two fell onto the track, partially blocking it. The car rolled and caught fire. Landing on a policeman, she was taken to hospital under observation, with a broken wrist and minor burns.

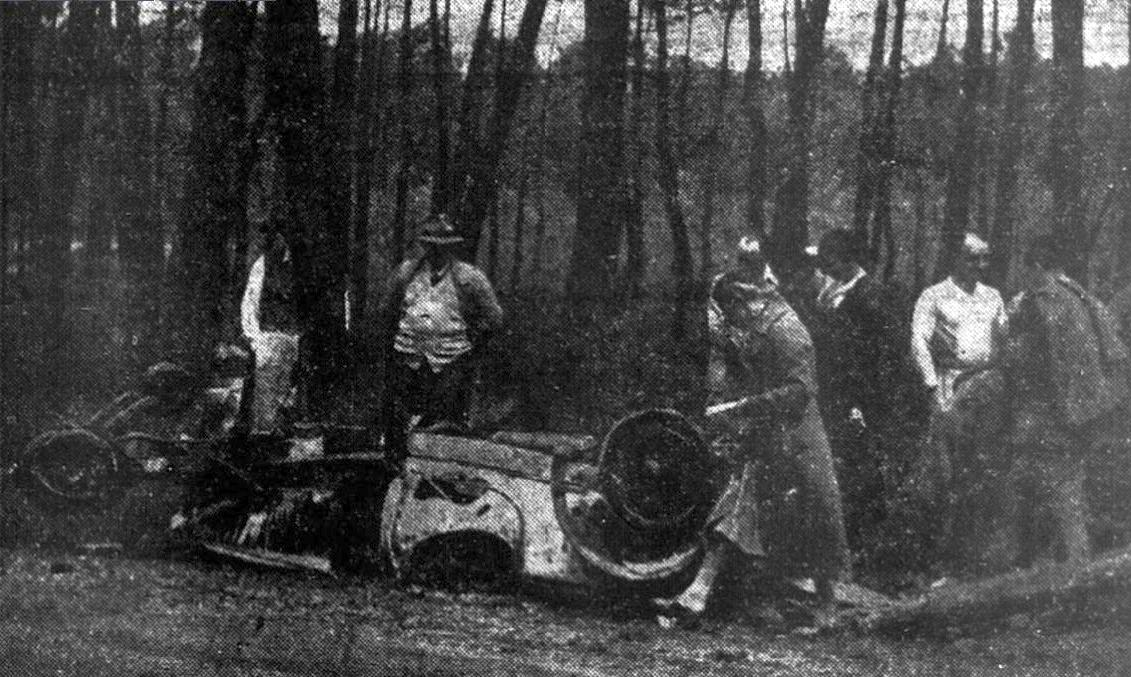
The remains of Odette Siko's Alfa Romeo

One of the first cars coming past was the little Austin. It had been running virtually without a clutch for most of the race at the back of the field. Unable to stop, Metchim struggled through the tree-debris but doing so broke a steering link. Without a spare on board, he was forced to retire. Soon after, Roger Labric, who had been in and out of the pits with the Lorraine-Dietrich, finally parked it with irreparable clutch problems. Bertelli, running sixth, pitted his Aston Martin at 7.30 to secure his fenders that were coming adrift – a delay that cost time and a position. As the bigger cars had their issues, the Riley of Peacock/van der Becke kept running like clockwork and picking up places. Eighth at dawn became sixth by 7am and then an impressive fourth by midday.

Nuvolari was driving very fast now and passed Gunzberg around 7.30. By 8am he had reduced Cortese's lead to 3½ minutes and kept whittling it down to overtake him on the pit-straight before 9am, when the leaders had completed 185 laps. Sommer took over at the next pitstop, continuing the hard charge and breaking the lap record yet again. At 10am, Cortese was somersaulted off the road just after Indianapolis because of a collapsed wheel bearing. He limped back to the pits, but the chassis was too misaligned to continue. Chiron was furious, Cortese disconsolate. The MG J-type of Gordon Hendy had started quickly, well ahead of its 100 km/h target. Then it had a misfire (cured by changing the sparkplugs) and a leak in its fuel-tank. The team resorted to chewing-gum and cardboard to plug the split. However, late in the morning it was stopped on the Hunaudières Straight with a terminal crankcase breakage.

With a two-lap lead over Chinetti/Gunzberg, things were looking positive for Sommer to get back-to-back victories. The British Alfa kept circulating regularly in third, waiting for the two in front to break.

=== Finish and post-race ===
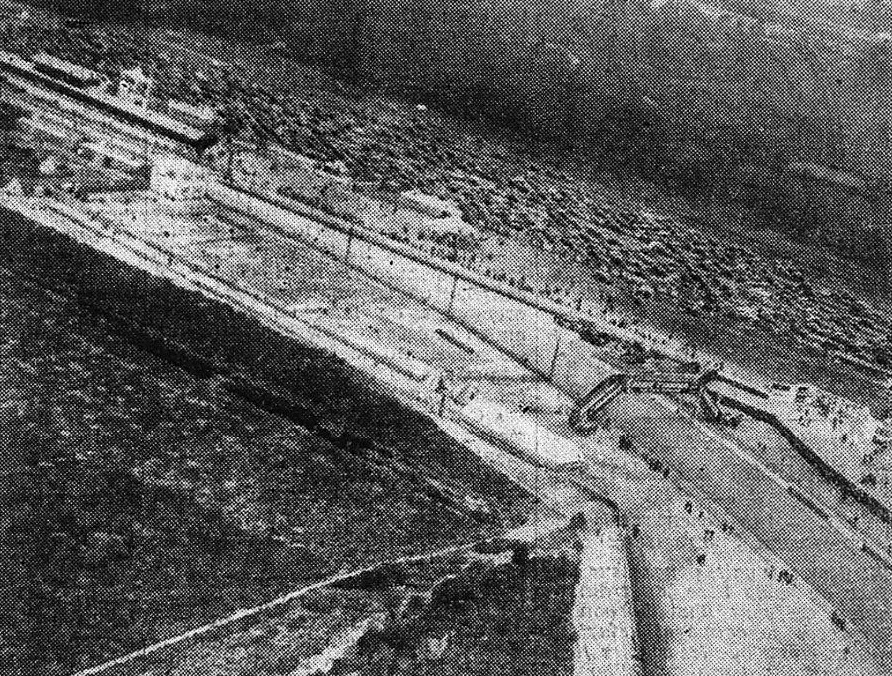
Aerial view of the pit straight and Champion curve

After 197 laps, and a single stint by a weary Sommer, Nuvolari took over again at midday but time was lost to re-affix the broken fender. The hard driving had taken its toll and there was also a cracked radiator mount, a split exhaust and the brakes were fading. Anxiety was building in the pit regarding the leaking fuel-tank and he made another stop to fix it. Like the MG team the mechanics sealed it with chewing-gum. Further stops were needed as the leak got worse and warranted more chewing gum – even Arthur Fox's mechanics joined in. These delays allowed Gunzberg to reduce the two minute gap to catch up and then take the lead. Fortunately the oversized fuel tank carried sufficient to still run the minimum 24 laps between top-ups, despite the leak. Nuvolari charged off after him and soon overtook the amateur driver. He made his final fuel-stop at 2.45pm. With forty minutes to go, both cars came in and Chinetti took over for the final stint. When Nuvolari stopped for a final repair, Chinetti took the lead with eight minutes to go.

Going onto the last lap, the cars were very close, and the lead changed three times: greater speed allowed Nuvolari to overtake on the Hunaudières straight, but better brakes allowed Chinetti to re-pass at the Mulsanne corner. Finally, under the great pressure Chinetti made the mistake, missing a gearchange at Arnage and running wide. Nuvolari took his chance and shot through. Up ahead, cars were crawling around waiting for the leaders to pass, to avoid doing another lap. The pair caught up with them coming out of White House. Seeing Nuvolari race past, François Paco in the Alfa saloon pulled out to follow him, right into the path of Chinetti. Braking hard to avoid ramming him, Chinetti was crucially baulked and that was all that Nuvolari needed to charge on to take the victory by the slimmest of margins – only 10 seconds, or barely 400 metres, after 24 hours racing.

Although Sommer had driven the bulk of the race (15 hours) it was Nuvolari who grabbed the headlines. All records were broken. The overall distance record was extended by more than 120 km (75 mi). Both the first two cars were the first to average more than 130 km/h (81 mph) in the race. With consecutive victories, Sommer won the Biennial Cup, and Chinetti still got his cash bonus.

Third, one hundred kilometres, and eight laps back were Lewis and Rose-Richards. Aside from a delay because of a broken headlamp mount during the night they had a fairly reliable run.

In a race of attrition, the little 1.1-litre Riley of Ken Peacock/Bill van der Becke came home an excellent fourth, comfortably winning the Index of Performance. Aston Martin was 5th for the third year in a row with Driscoll/Penn-Hughes going fourteen laps further than the previous year. Their delayed stablemate, of Bertelli & Davis made it to seventh. Splitting them was the small supercharged MG of Ford/Baumer that beat its target distance by 33 laps. After surviving the ordeal overnight with the dynamo and the lights the car had run very well, picking up places as others fell back. After blocking Chinetti on the last lap Paco brought the Alfa saloon home in eighth. The Tracta was ninth, finishing a distant second in class behind the MG but still beating its target distance by 30 laps and going further than any Tracta car had previously.

A fortnight later, Chinetti and Chiron got some revenge when they combined to win the Spa 24 Hours together. Sommer, this time driving his Le Mans-winning car with veteran Henri Stoffel, came in second. It was a violent year in motorsport with a number of fatal and serious accidents. The worst was at Monza during the secondary Monza GP held on the same day as the Italian Grand Prix. It was raced as three heats before a final. During the second heat former Alfa Corse works drivers Giuseppe Campari and Baconin Borzacchini collided and crashed on the south banking, killing both. Czaykowski had won the first heat, and in the final was racing for the lead when he also crashed fatally just metres beyond the earlier accident.

This proved to be Nuvolari's only Le Mans appearance. The danger carried over into the next year. Early in the season, Nuvolari broke his leg crashing in the rain at a minor Italian race. Although he did subsequently race with his leg in plaster, he would not return to defend his victory. Guy Moll scored a sensational win at the Monaco Grand Prix but was killed at the Coppa Acerbo. Czaykowski's erstwhile co-driver, Jean Gaupillat, was also killed in 1934, in a French race.

The 1933 race was the last for two significant teams from the races in the 1920s, though both had rather subdued endings. SARA had entered all of the first eight races. Their best finish was fourth overall in 1927, but this year after a number of delays, the car missed its target distance by only 15 kilometres (2 laps). Bentley had dominated Le Mans, having won the event outright five times – half the races to date. But when Gas put his Bentley into the fence on his first racing lap after only two hours, the damage was too severe to continue, and it was the end of an era. Seventy years later, Bentley would return to Le Mans as a subsidiary of Volkswagen Group. They recorded three consecutive prototype class victories, culminating in outright victory in 2003.

== Official results ==
=== Finishers ===
Results taken from Quentin Spurring's book, officially licensed by the ACO Class Winners are in Bold text.

Pos	Class	No.	Team	Drivers	Chassis	Engine	Tyre	Target distance*	Laps
1	**5.0****	**11**	**(France) R. Sommer** (private entrant)	**(France) Raymond Sommer** **(Italy) Tazio Nuvolari**	Alfa Romeo 8C-2300 MM-LM	Alfa Romeo 2.3L S8 supercharged	P	177 [B]	233
2	5.0**	8	(Italy) L. Chinetti (private entrant)	(Italy) Luigi Chinetti (France) "Philippe Varent" (Philippe de Gunzburg)	Alfa Romeo 8C-2300 MM-LM	Alfa Romeo 2.3L S8 supercharged	D	177	233
3	5.0**	12	(United Kingdom) Arthur W. Fox	(United Kingdom) Brian Lewis, Baron Essendon (United Kingdom) Tim Rose-Richards	Alfa Romeo 8C-2300 LM	Alfa Romeo 2.3L S8 supercharged	D	177 [B]	225
4	**1.5**	**30**	**(United Kingdom) Riley (Coventry) Ltd**	**(United Kingdom) Kenneth Peacock** **(United Kingdom) Alex "Bill" van der Becke**	Riley Nine Brooklands	Riley 1091cc S4	D	136	191
5	1.5	25	(United Kingdom) Aston Martin Ltd.	(United Kingdom) Pat Driscoll (United Kingdom) Clifton Penn-Hughes	Aston Martin 1½ Le Mans	Aston Martin 1496cc S4	D	149 [B]	188
6	**1.0****	**41**	**(United Kingdom) J.L. Ford** (private entrant)	**(United Kingdom) John Ludovic Ford** **(United Kingdom) Maurice Baumer**	MG C-type Midget	MG 745cc S4 supercharged	D	135	176
7	1.5	24	(United Kingdom) Aston Martin Ltd.	(United Kingdom) Augustus "Bert" Bertelli (United Kingdom) S. C. H. "Sammy" Davis	Aston Martin 1½ Le Mans	Aston Martin 1496cc S4	D	149 [B]	174
8	**3.0****	**21**	**(France) A. Rousseau** (private entrant)	**(France) André Rousseau** **(France) François Paco**	Alfa Romeo 6C-1750 GS Coupé	Alfa Romeo 1742cc S6 supercharged	D	164	167
9	1.0	35	(France) SA des Automobiles; Tracta	(France) Félix Quinault (France) Pierre Padrault	Tracta Type A	SCAP 999cc S4	D	131	161
10	1.5**	28	(France) J.-É. Vernet (private entrant)	(France) Just-Émile Vernet (France) Fernand Vallon	Salmson GS Spéciale	Salmson 1092cc S4 supercharged	D	146	159
11	1.5	32	(France) Alin Fréres (private entrant)	(France) Adrien Alin (France) Albert Alin	BNC Type 527 Sport	Ruby 1087cc S4	D	136	151
N/C ***	2.0	19	(France) Société des Automobiles Charley	(France) Gaston Mottet (France) André Marandet	SARA SP7 Spéciale	SARA 1818cc S6	D	152	150 ***
12	1.5	34	(France) Équipe de l'Ours	(France) Jean de Gavardie (France) Henri de Gavardie	Amilcar CO; Spéciale Martin	Amilcar 1094cc S6	D	135	148
13	1.0	37	(United Kingdom) Singer Motors	(United Kingdom) F. Stanley Barnes (United Kingdom) Alf Langley	Singer Nine Sports	Singer 972cc S4	D	130	140

=== Did Not Finish ===
Pos	Class	No	Team	Drivers	Chassis	Engine	Tyre	Target distance*	Laps	Reason
DNF	5.0**	15	(Monaco) L. Chiron (private entrant)	(Monaco) Louis Chiron (Italy) Franco Cortese	Alfa Romeo 8C-2300 LM	Alfa Romeo 2.3L S8 supercharged	E	177	177	accident damage (18 hr)
DNF	1.0**	38	(United Kingdom) N. Black (private entrant)	(United Kingdom) Gordon Hendy (United Kingdom) Harold Parker	MG J3 Midget	MG 745cc S4 supercharged	D	133	125	engine (19 hr)
DNF	3.0**	20	(France) O. Siko (private entrant)	(France) Odette Siko (France) "Sabipa" (Louis Charavel)	Alfa Romeo 6C-1750 SS	Alfa Romeo 1768cc S6 supercharged	D	168 [B]	120	accident (15 hr)
DNF	5.0+**	3	(France) G. Bouriat (private entrant)	(France) Pierre Bussienne (France) Marie Desprez	Bugatti Type 50S	Bugatti 5.0L S8 supercharged	D	193	119	radiator (13 hr)
DNF	5.0	6	(France) R. Labric (private entrant)	(France) Roger Labric (France) Guy Daniel	Lorraine-Dietrich B3-6 Le Mans	Lorraine-Dietrich 3.4L S6	D	180 [B]	105	transmission (18 hr)
DNF	1.5	26	(United Kingdom) Aston Martin Ltd.	(United Kingdom) Mortimer Morris-Goodall (United Kingdom) Elsie "Bill" Wisdom	Aston Martin International	Aston Martin 1496cc S4	D	149	84	engine (13 hr)
DNF	750	42	(United Kingdom) H.B. Metchim (private entrant)	(United Kingdom) Charles Metchim (United Kingdom) Cecil Masters	Austin 7 Chummy Special	Austin 742cc S4	D	117	78	steering link (15 hr)
DSQ	5.0**	10	(France) P.-L. Dreyfus (private entrant)	(Algeria) Guy Moll (Algeria) Guy Cloitre	Alfa Romeo 8C-2300 LM	Alfa Romeo 2.3L S8 supercharged	D	177	77	push start (~8 hr)
DNF	1.5	23	(Poland) S. Czaykowski (private entrant)	(Poland) Count Stanisław Czaykowski (France) Jean Gaupillat	Bugatti Type 51A	Bugatti 1493cc S8	D	158	52	electrics (~7 hr)
DSQ	5.0+	2	(Romania) N. von Hohenzollern- Sigmaringen (private entrant)	Prince Nicholas of Romania (France) Joseph Cattaneo	Duesenberg Model SJ	Duesenberg 6.9L S8 supercharged	D	193	50	premature refuelling (6 hr)
DNF	1.5	27	(France) J. Danne (private entrant)	(France) Jean Danne (France) Charles Duruy	Rally NCP	Salmson 1362cc S4 supercharged	E	153	39	accident damage (~5 hr)
DNF	5.0+**	5	(France) J. Trévoux (private entrant)	(France) Jean Trévoux (France) Louis Gas	Bentley 4½ "Blower"	Bentley 4.4L S6 supercharged	D	193	25	accident damage (3 hr)
DNF	1.5	31	(France) J. Sébilleau (private entrant)	(France) Jean Sébilleau (France) Georges Delaroche	Riley Nine Brooklands	Riley 1091cc S4	D	136 [B]	20	engine (4 hr)
DSQ	1.0	36	(France) Équipe de l'Ours	(France) Clément-Auguste Martin (France) Auguste Bodoignet	Amilcar CO/4; Spéciale Martin	Amilcar 990cc S4	D	131 [B]	13	premature water (~2 hr)
DNF	1.5	33	(France) Équipe de l'Ours	(France) Lucien Buquet (France) Bernard Clouet	Amilcar CO/4; Spéciale Martin	Amilcar 1074cc S4	D	135	13	radiator (~2 hr)
Sources:

- Note *: [B]= car also entered in the 1932-33 Biennial Cup.
- Note **: equivalent class for supercharging, with x1.4 modifier to engine capacity.
- Note ***: Not Classified, as did not reach target distance

=== Did Not Start ===
Pos	Class	No	Team	Drivers	Chassis	Engine	Reason
DNA	5.0+	1	(France) Foucret Fréres (private entrant)	(France) Marcel Foucret (France) Paul Foucret	Mercedes-Benz SSK	Mercedes-Benz 7.1L S6 supercharged	Did not arrive
DNA	5.0+**	4			Bugatti Type 50S	Bugatti 5.0L S8 supercharged	Did not arrive
DNA	5.0+**	-		(France) Ernest Friderich	Bugatti Type 54	Bugatti 5.0L S8 supercharged	Did not arrive
DNA	3.0	7	(United Kingdom) R. Gunter (private entrant)	(United Kingdom) Sir Roland Gunter (United Kingdom) Dr Dudley Benjafield	Alvis Speed 20 SA	Alvis 2.5L S6	Did not arrive
DNA	5.0**	9	(United Kingdom) Earl Howe (private entrant)	(United Kingdom) Francis Curzon, Earl Howe (United Kingdom) Hugh Hamilton	Alfa Romeo 8C-2300 LM	Alfa Romeo 2.3L S8 supercharged	Driver injured
DNA	5.0**	14	(United Kingdom) G. Eyston (private entrant)	(United Kingdom) George Eyston	Alfa Romeo 8C-2300 LM	Alfa Romeo 2.3L S8 supercharged	Did not arrive
DNA	5.0**	16	(France) A. Carré (private entrant)	(France) "Jean Renaldi" (André Carré) (France) Raymond Gaillard	Bugatti Type 55	Bugatti 2.3L S8 supercharged	Did not arrive
DNA	2.0	18	(United Kingdom) D.M.K. Marendaz (private entrant)	(United Kingdom) Capt Donald Marendaz	Marendaz 13/70	Marendaz 1869cc V6	Did not arrive
DNA	3.0**	22	(France) M. Mareuse (private entrant)	(France) Marguerite Mareuse (France) Jean-Pierre Wimille	Bugatti Type 40	Bugatti 1496cc S4 supercharged	Did not arrive
DNA	1.5	-	(United Kingdom) R.F. Oats (private entrant)	(United Kingdom) Richard Oats	Aston Martin 1½ Le Mans	Aston Martin 1496cc S4	Did not arrive
DNA	1.5	29	(United Kingdom) Riley (Coventry) Ltd	(United Kingdom) Alex "Bill" van der Becke (United Kingdom) Kenneth Peacock	Riley Nine Brooklands	Riley 1091cc S4	Did not arrive
DNA	1.0**	39	(United Kingdom) Hon. Mrs J. Chetwynd (private entrant)		MG Midget C-type	MG 746cc S4 supercharged	Did not arrive
DNA	1.0**	40	(United Kingdom) F. Samuelson (private entrant)	(United Kingdom) Sir Francis Samuelson (Australia) Bernard Rubin	MG Midget C-type	MG 746cc S4 supercharged	Did not arrive

=== 1933 Index of Performance ===
Pos	1932-33 Biennial Cup	Class	No.	Team	Drivers	Chassis	Index Result
1	-	1.5	30	(United Kingdom) Riley (Coventry) Ltd	(United Kingdom) Kenneth Peacock (United Kingdom) Alex "Bill" van der Becke	Riley Nine Brooklands	1.415
2	-	1.0	41	(United Kingdom) J.L. Ford (private entrant)	(United Kingdom) John Ludovic Ford (United Kingdom) Maurice Baumer	MG C-type Midget	1.331
3	1st	5.0	11	(France) R. Sommer (private entrant)	(France) Raymond Sommer (Italy) Tazio Nuvolari	Alfa Romeo 8C-2300 MM-LM	1.320
4	-	5.0	8	(Italy) L. Chinetti (private entrant)	(Italy) Luigi Chinetti (France) "Philippe Varent" (Philippe de Gunzburg)	Alfa Romeo 8C-2300 MM-LM	1.316
5	2nd	1.5	25	(United Kingdom) Aston Martin Ltd.	(United Kingdom) Pat Driscoll (United Kingdom) Clifton Penn-Hughes	Aston Martin 1½ Le Mans	1.296
6	3rd	5.0	12	(United Kingdom) Arthur W. Fox	(United Kingdom) Brian Lewis, Baron Essendon (United Kingdom) Tim Rose-Richards	Alfa Romeo 8C-2300 LM	1.277
7	-	1.0	35	(France) SA des Automobiles; Tracta	(France) Félix Quinault (France) Pierre Padrault	Tracta Type A	1.237
8	-	1.5	28	(France) J.-É. Vernet (private entrant)	(France) Just-Émile Vernet (France) Fernand Vallon	Salmson GS Spéciale	1.181
9	4th	1.5	24	(United Kingdom) Aston Martin Ltd.	(United Kingdom) Augustus "Bert" Bertelli (United Kingdom) S. C. H. "Sammy" Davis	Aston Martin 1½ Le Mans	1.177
10	-	1.5	32	(France) Alin Fréres (private entrant)	(France) Adrien Alin (France) Albert Alin	BNC Type 527 Sport	1.124

- Note: A score of 1.00 means meeting the minimum distance for the car, and a higher score is exceeding the nominal target distance. Only the top-10 finishers are listed

=== Class Winners ===
Class	Winning car	Winning drivers
Over 5-litre	no finishers	
3 to 5-litre	#11 Alfa Romeo 8C-2300 MM-LM	Sommer / Nuvolari *
2 to 3-litre	#21 Alfa Romeo 6C-1750 GS Coupé	Rousseau / Paco
1500 to 2000cc	no finishers	
1000 to 1500cc	#30 Riley Nine Brooklands	Peacock / van der Becke *
Up to 1000cc	#41 MG C-type Midget	Ford / Baumer *
Note *: setting a new class distance record.

=== Statistics ===
- Fastest Lap – R. Sommer, #11 Alfa Romeo 8C-2300 MM-LM – 5:31.4secs; 146.39 km/h (90.96 mph)
- Winning Distance – 3,144.04 km (1,953.62 mi)
- Winner's Average Speed – 131.00 km/h (81.40 mph)
