= A C Bertelli =

Anglo-Italian car designer, racing driver, mechanic, and businessman

Augustus Cesare Bertelli
- Born: 23 March 1890
- Died: 3 May 1979 (aged 89)

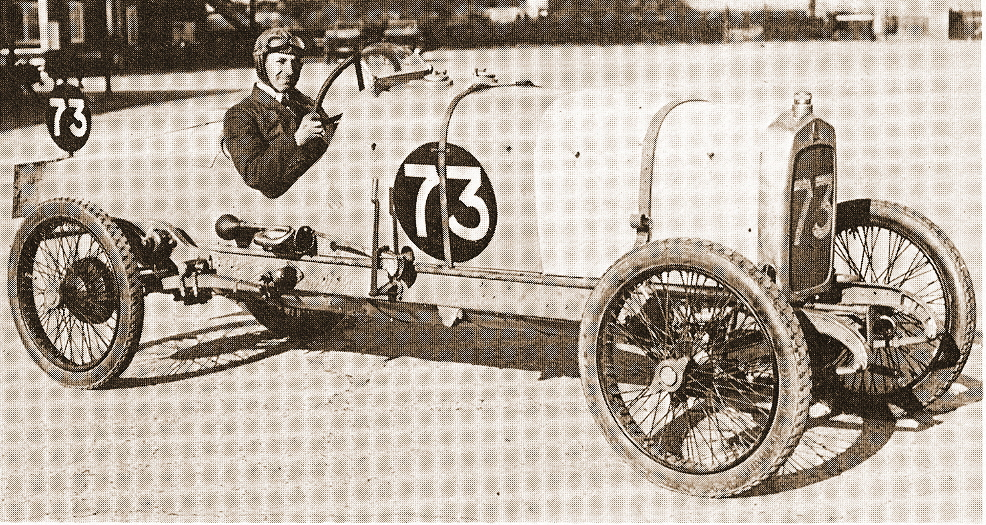
Enfield-Allday-10/20-Monoposto by Augustus Bertelli, 1919

Augustus Cesare Bertelli (1890–1979), known as "Bert" to his colleagues or "Gus" to his family, was an Anglo-Italian car designer, racing driver, mechanic, and businessman.

== Family and education ==
Bertelli was born in Genoa, Italy, on 23 March 1890. In 1894 the family emigrated and settled in Cardiff, South Wales where after leaving school he was taken on as an apprentice at a local steel works. He studied in the evenings at University College to gain technical qualifications and gained also a lifetime interest in rugby.

== Racing car mechanic ==
He returned to Italy and got a job in the development department of FIAT in Turin and while there met racing driver Felice Nazzaro and was taken on as a riding mechanic, winning the 1908 Targa Bologna. Just before the outbreak of World War I he returned to the United Kingdom and studied aeronautical engineering and got a job in the design office of Grahame-White in Hendon, North London, where he remained until 1918.

After the war he was called in as a consultant to overcome problems at Enfield-Allday, where their first car was suffering design and cost problems, and was soon employed there full time as Works Manager, but was unable to save the company which collapsed in 1923. Enfield-Alldays had made a few racing cars based on their 10/20 model which Bertelli had driven with some success.

Even before Enfield-Alldays had failed Bertelli was working as a consultant assisting such companies as Armstrong Siddeley, Coventry Simplex and Rover. During this time he met Woolf Barnato and built at his Lingfield, Surrey, house three cars based on Enfiled-Alldays chassis.

=== Aston Martin ===
While working at Armstrong Siddeley he had met William Renwick, an engineer who had inherited a great deal of money, and the two formed a company Renwick & Bertelli Ltd in Birmingham in 1924. The product of this partnership was a car called the R & B but known informally as "Buzzbox". This used a four cylinder 1.5 Litre overhead camshaft again mounted in an Enfield-Alldays chassis. The pair came to the notice of the Hon. John Benson, whose mother Lady Charnwood had recently bought Bamford and Martin, and in 1926 Bertelli and Renwick both joined the board of what became Aston Martin Motors Ltd. Buzzbox would become the basis of a new range of cars.

Bertelli continued racing cars into the 1930s, his best achievement being winning the Coupe Biennale at the 24 Hours of Le Mans in 1932, sharing an Aston Martin International with Pat Driscoll.

Aston Martin went through a succession of owners and in 1928 was purchased by Sidney Whitehouse, who also bought Renwick & Bertelli and merged the companies. In 1931 Renwick left the company and moved to the United States.

Bertelli remained with Aston Martin until 1938, when following differences with R. Gordon Sutherland, son of the owner Sir Arthur Munro Sutherland, he resigned and returned to his previous occupation as an engineering consultant. He was then approached by Wallace Devereux of High Duty Alloys, a subsidiary of Hawker Siddeley, and asked to design a car but World War II broke out before a prototype was completed. He continued however to work for High Duty Alloys until he retired in 1955.

In 1940 the family had moved to a 150 acre farm at Wargrave, Berkshire, where they raised pigs.

== Personal life ==
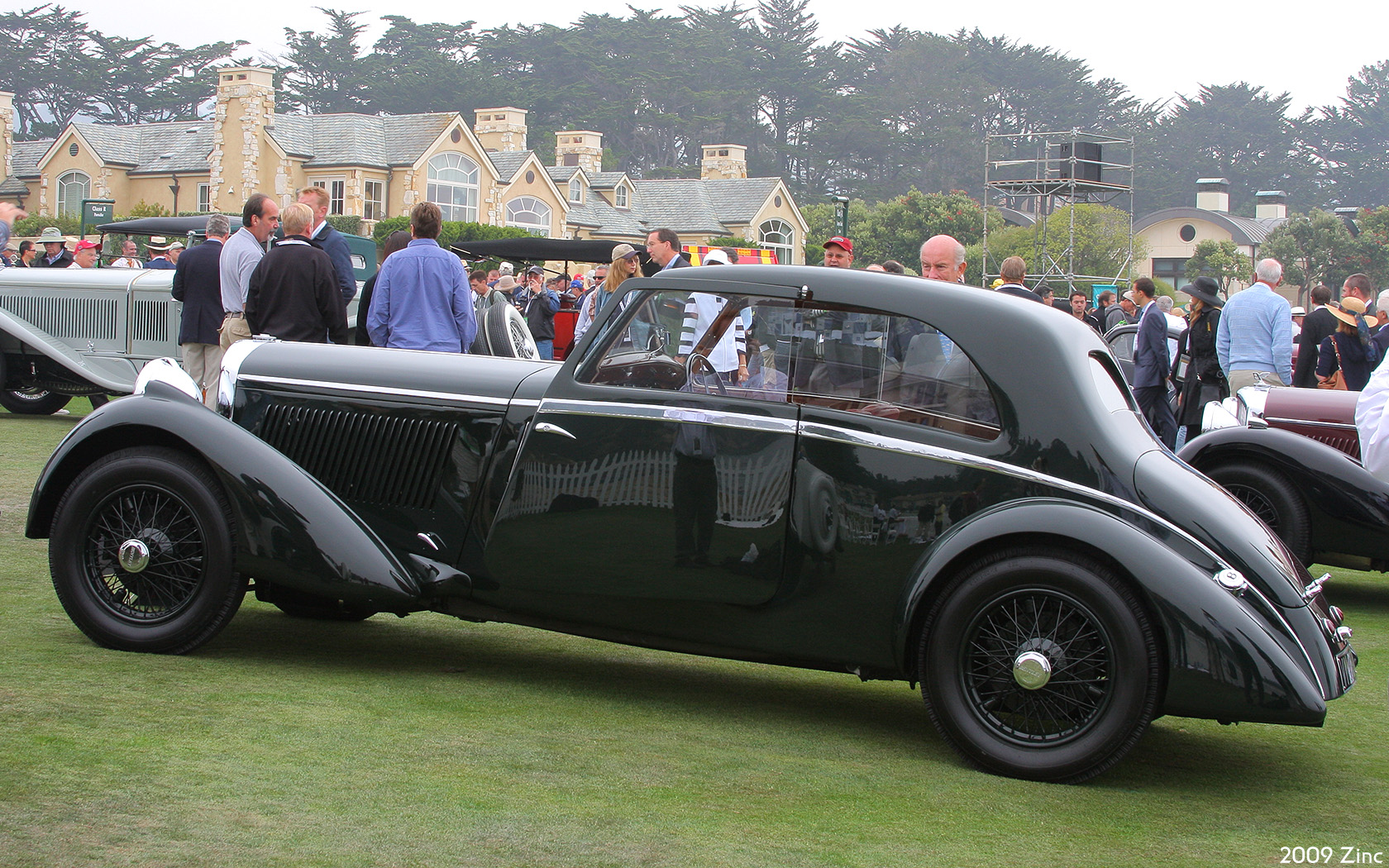
1935 fixed head coupé by Bertelli of Feltham on a Bentley 3½-litre chassis

Gus Bertelli married Vera Shaw in 1920 and the couple had three children, two daughters and a son. Bill Bertelli (1925–2012) was an engineer who served in the Royal Electrical and Mechanical Engineers during the Second World War. Bill left the army aged 23 as an acting Major and embarked on a career in engineering in a variety of roles.

Gus's brother Enrico (Harry) Bertelli was a coachbuilder who designed and made bodies for many pre-war Aston Martins in a factory next door to their works.
