= Odette Siko =

French racing driver

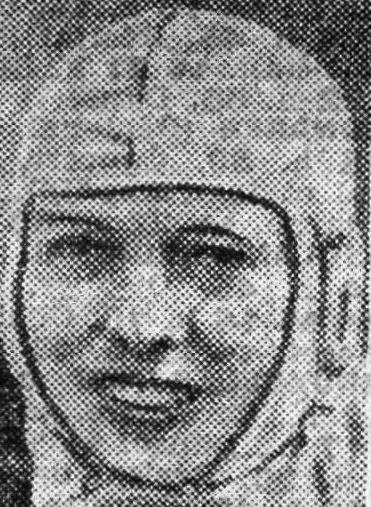
Odette Siko in 1934.

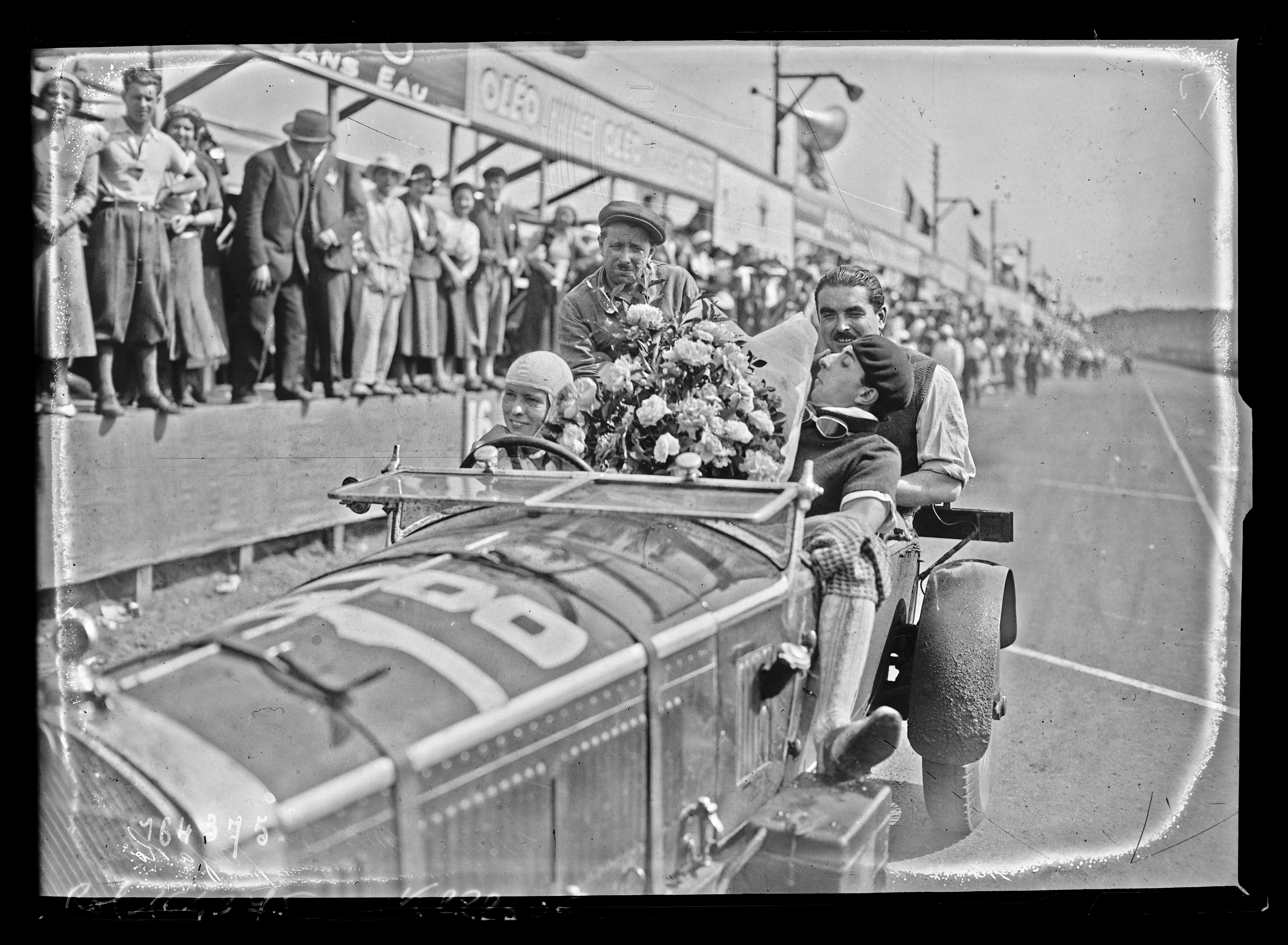
Siko placed fourth outright in the 1932 24 Hours of Le Mans driving an Alfa Romeo 6C-1750 SS with "Sabipa"

Odette Siko (July 14, 1899 – August 31, 1984) was a French auto racing driver, who competed in endurance and rally racing during the 1920s and 1930s. At the 1932 24 Hours of Le Mans, she won the 2 Liter class and finished in fourth place overall, becoming the highest placing female driver in the event's history. Siko competed in three more Le Mans 24 hour races.

== Auto racing career ==
Siko began competing occasionally in the late 1920s. She became the highest-ranked woman competitor to date in the 24 Hours of Le Mans when she placed fourth overall in the 1932 edition (and winner 2L class.), for a total of 4 entries: 1930 (7th with Marguerite Mareuse, Bugatti Type 40 1.5L I4), 1931 (disqualified confusion of signals, even co-pilot and the vehicle), 1932 (cf. place with Louis Charavel (alias Jean Sabipa) Alfa Romeo 6C 1750 1.7L I6 compressor, personal property of Mrs. Siko), and 1933 (by accident-Abd. against a tree-even copilot (Sabipa) on his Alfa Romeo 6C 1750 1.9L I6 compressor).

From 1933, her career leaned more towards rallies and participating in the Paris-Saint-Raphaël women's race with Hellé Nice, and in 1935 at the Monte Carlo Rally (as copilot Simone Louise of Forest). In 1936 she drove a Bugatti during the Critérium de Paris-Nice, (86 final).

In 1937, she participated in speed trials for ten days (from 19 to 29 May) on the ring circuit of Montlhery on behalf Yacco motor oils, as "road captain" of four women, including Helle Nice Simone of Forest and Claire Descollas, who then defeated 25 world records (10 endurance and 15 in Group C International, some of which still stand to this day) in an atmosphere that was sometimes difficult between them. They went through more than 30,000 km at an average speed of 140 km / h. Their vehicle was a Ford "Matford" Mathis 3600 cm3 V8 engine nicknamed "Claire" by the team's mechanics (perhaps by Miss Descollas itself in the early sessions, because it was rugged with 1 day).

In 1939, still driving the "Matford", she returned a second time in Monte-Carlo, with Louise Lamberjack for copilot: Starting from Tallinn, the two women ended the race 18th, after a very rough start to the year. The Second World War finally interrupted her career in racing.
