= 1948 Garda Grand Prix =

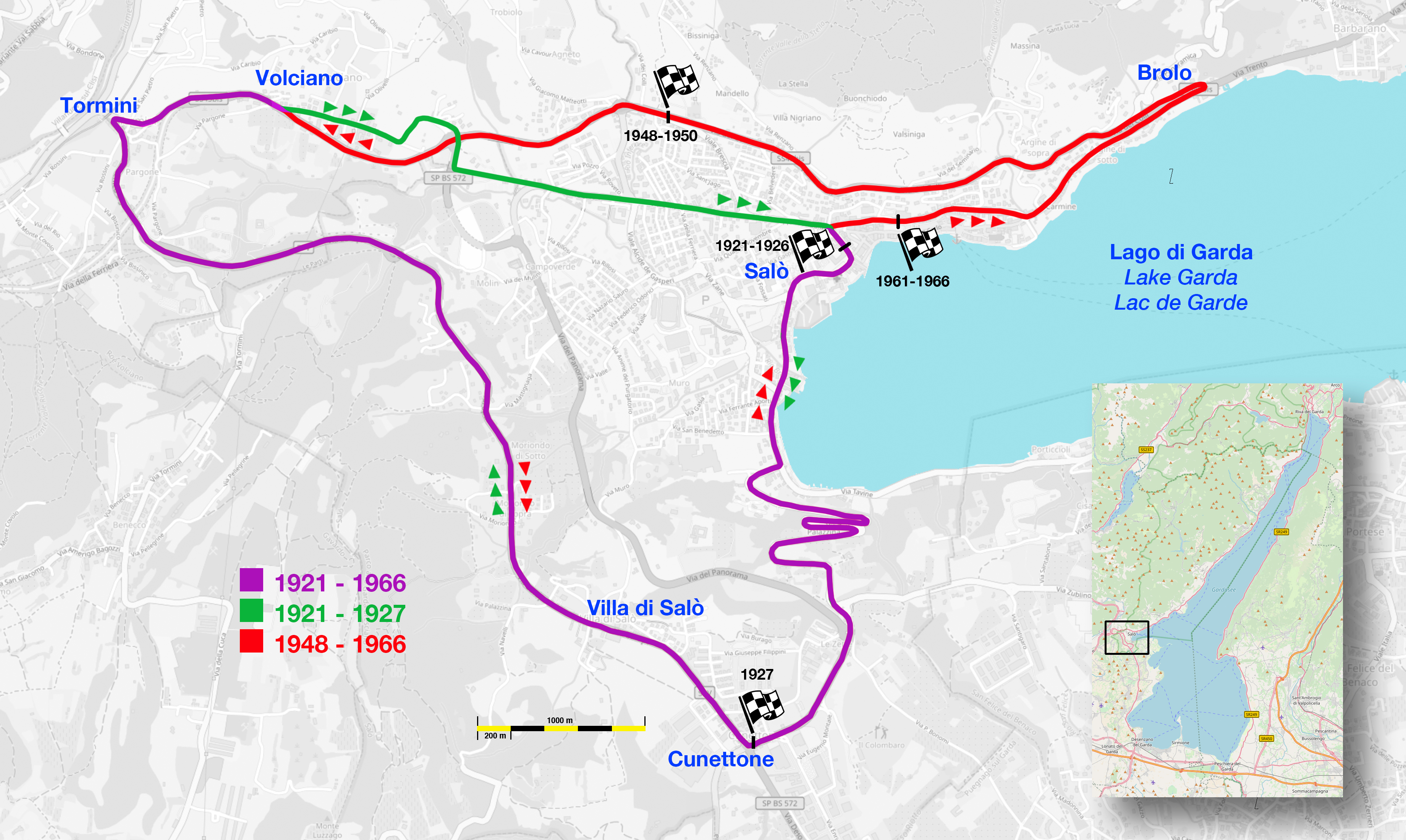

Race details
- Date: 24 October 1948
- Official name: Circuito del Garda
- Location: Circuito del Garda, Salò, Italy
- Course: Temporary road circuit
- Course length: 16.37 km (10.17 mi)
- Distance: 18 laps, 294.71 km (183.12 mi)

Pole position
Driver	(Italy) Giuseppe Farina	Ferrari
- Time: 8:05.8

Fastest lap
Driver	(Italy) Giuseppe Farina	Ferrari
- Time: 8:09.4

Podium
First	(Italy) Giuseppe Farina	Ferrari
Second	(Italy) Bruno Sterzi	Ferrari
Third	(Italy) Luigi Villoresi	Maserati

The 1948 Circuito del Garda was a motor race for Formula One cars held at Circuito del Garda, Salò on 24 October 1948. Giuseppe Farina won the race in a Ferrari 125, the first Grand Prix win for a purpose-built single-seater Ferrari. Farina also qualified on pole position and set fastest lap. Bruno Sterzi was second in a privately entered Ferrari 166 S and Luigi Villoresi third in a Maserati 4CLT/48.

== Result ==
Pos	No	Driver	Entrant	Constructor	Time/Retired	Grid
1	6	(Italy) Giuseppe Farina	Scuderia Ferrari	Ferrari 125	2:30:49.8, 117.24kph	1
2	34	(Italy) Bruno Sterzi	Bruno Sterzi	Ferrari 166 S	+2:34.2	2
3	20	(Italy) Luigi Villoresi	Scuderia Ambrosiana	Maserati 4CLT/48	+2:38.2	3
4	2	(Italy) Soave Besana	Comte Soave Besana	Ferrari 166 S	+3:27.4	
5	10	(France) Eugène Chaboud	Ecurie France	Talbot-Lago T26C	+6:00.2	
6	14	(Italy) Ferdinando Righetti (Italy) Clemente Biondetti	Ferdinando Righetti	Ferrari 166 S	+8:28.2	
7	4	(France) Pierre Levegh	Pierre Levegh	Talbot-Lago T26C	+1 lap	
8	22	(France) Igor Troubetzkoy	Igor Troubetzkoy	Ferrari 166C	+2 laps	
9	8	(United Kingdom) Cuth Harrison	Cuth Harrison	ERA B-Type	+10 laps	
Ret	38	(Italy) Giampiero Bianchetti	Giampiero Bianchetti	Ferrari 166SC		
Ret	48	(Italy) Ugo Bornioli	Ugo Bornioli	Cisitalia D46-Fiat		
Ret	24	(Italy) Federico Pariani	Federico Pariani	Cisitalia D46-Fiat		
Ret	18	(Italy) Giovanni Bracco	Giovanni Bracco	Ferrari 166C		4
Ret	28	(Italy) Emilio Romano	Emilio Romano	Maserati A6GCS		
	30	(France) Robert Manzon	Equipe Gordini	Simca Gordini Type 15		
	16	(Italy) Clemente Biondetti	Scuderia Ferrari	Ferrari 166SC		

Grand Prix Race
1948 Grand Prix season
Previous race: 1927 Garda Grand Prix	Garda Grand Prix	Next race: 1949 Garda Grand Prix
