= Bruno Sterzi =

Italian racing driver

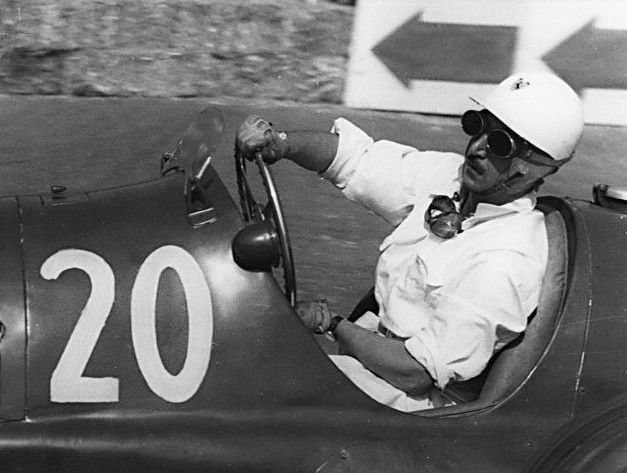
- Bruno Sterzi drives his private 1948 Ferrari 166 F2, s/n 01F at 1949 Garda race (10 July 1949). He had entry #20 and had a bad accident that destroyed the car, which was rebuilt, possibly restamped as s/n 011F and sold to an Argentine.
- Born: 1922 Kingdom of Italy
- Died: 10 November 1980 (aged 57–58) Milan, Italy

Count Bruno Sterzi (1922 – 10 November 1980) was an Italian nobleman, businessman and a former automobile racing driver and team owner. Owner of a paper mill, he was a skilful sports car driver in the late 1940s and early 1950s. On 29 May 1949, Bruno Sterzi won in Ferrari 166 S the 1st Coppa Intereuropa in Monza Circuit.

== Racing record ==
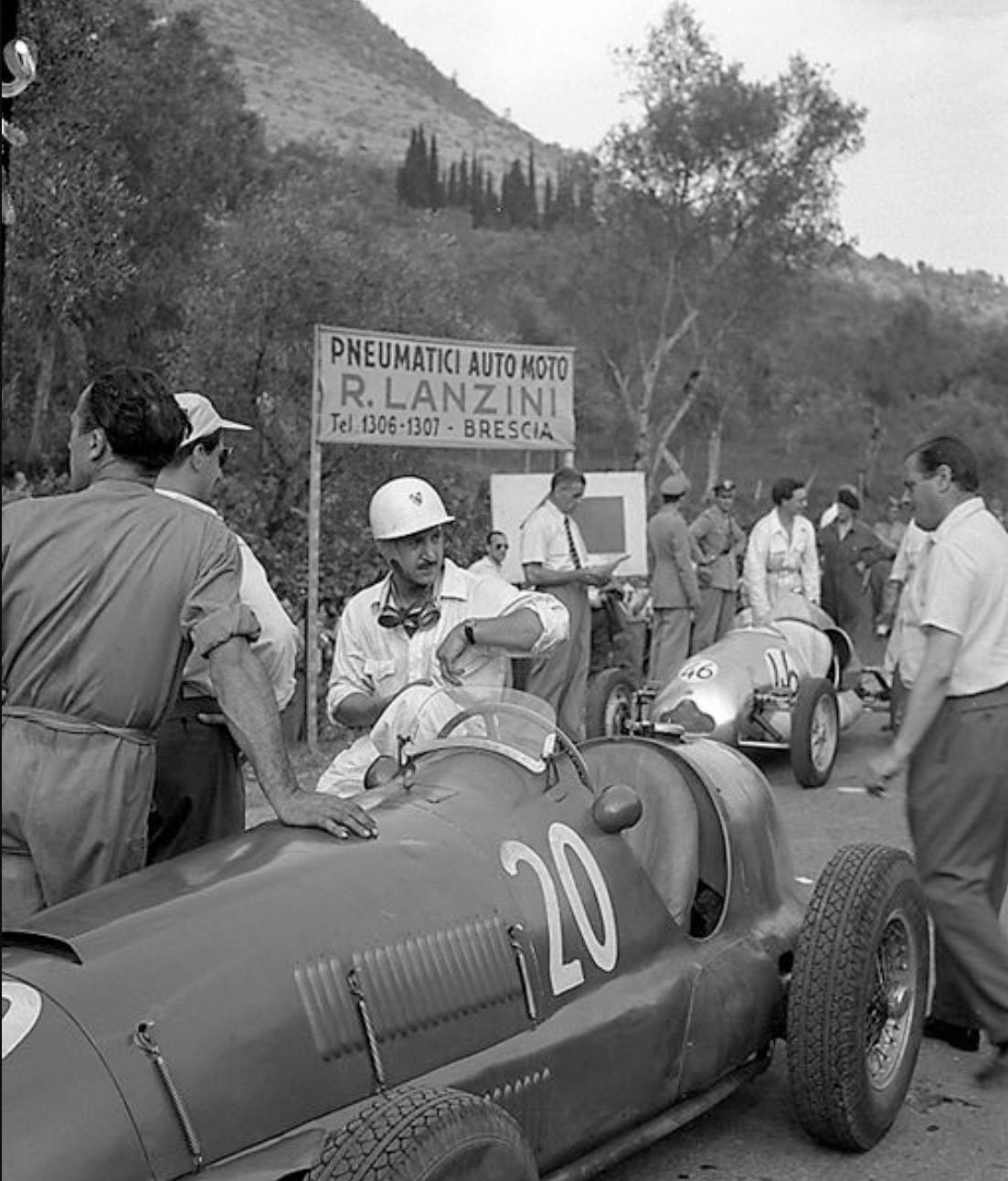
Bruno Sterzi in what looks like his private 1948 Ferrari 166 F2, s/n 01F at 1949 Garda race (10 July 1949). Behind Sterzi's Ferrari can be seen the Cooper-JAP T9 #46 which was driven by a 19 year old Stirling Moss.

=== Career highlights ===
Season	Date	Series	Position	Team	#	Car	Division
1948	4 April 1948	Targa Florio	6th	Scuderia Inter	297	Ferrari 166 Spyder Corsa s/n 010i	Sports Car
1948	15 August 1948	XVII Circuito di Pescara	2nd	Bruno Sterzi	12	Ferrari 166 Spyder Corsa s/n 012i	Sports Car
1948	24 October 1948	Circuito del Garda	2nd	Bruno Sterzi	34	Ferrari 166 Spyder Corsa s/n 018i	FIA Formula 1
1949	29 May 1949	1st Coppa Intereuropa	1st	Bruno Sterzi	16	Ferrari 166 S	Sports Car
1949	10 July 1949	Circuito del Garda	DNF	Scuderia Ferrari	20	Ferrari 166 F2 s/n 01F	FIA Formula 2
1952		4th Coppa Intereuropa	1st	Bruno Sterzi		Ferrari 225 S	Sports Car
1953	26 July 1953	10 Hours of Messina	8th	Bruno Sterzi and Franco Cortese		Ferrari 166 MM Vignale Spider s/n 0278M	Sports Car

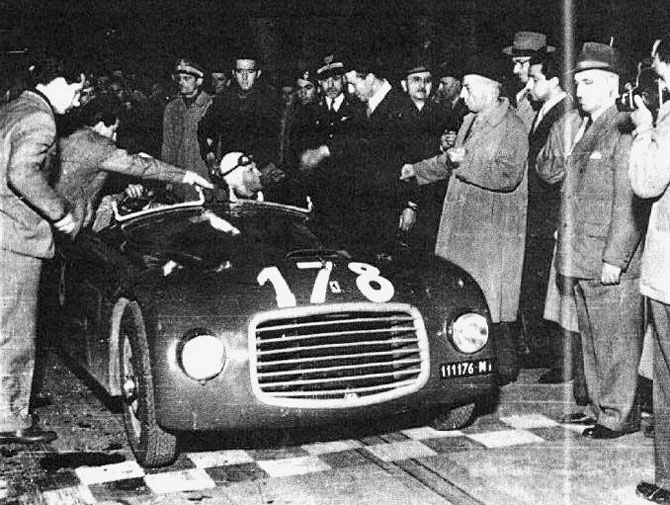
Bruno Sterzi (owner) and Ferdinando Righetti (Ferrari mechanic) drove this 1948 Ferrari 166 S Allemano Spyder s/n 001S at Mille Miglia endurance race in Italia on 2 May 1948. They had entry #178 but did not finish

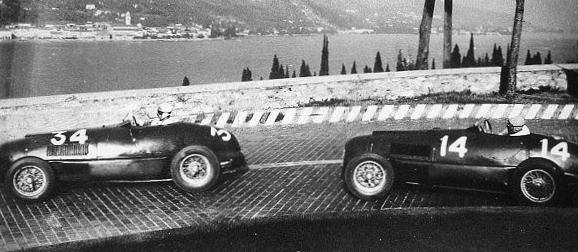
Two Ferrari 166 at Circuito del Garda outside Salò in northern Italy on 24 Ottobre 1948. To the left (entry #34) is the 1948 Ferrari 166 SC s/n 018i driven by its owner Bruno Sterzi (got 2nd place), and on the right (entry #14) is the 1948 Ferrari 166 SC s/n 008i (aka "Ansaloni Spider Corsa SWB") driven by Ferdinando Righetti and/or Clemente Biondetti (became 6th overall).

== See also ==
- List of major automobile races in Italy
- 6 Hours of Monza
