= Carrozzeria Allemano =

Italian automobile coachbuilder

Carrozzeria Allemano (established 1928, discontinued 1965) was an automobile coachbuilder in Turin, Italy, owned by Serafino Allemano.

Allemano made various cars based on their own designs. They also built externally designed vehicles, such as those by Giovanni Michelotti.

== Automobiles created ==
Some of the earlier cars Carrozzeria Allemano created were the Ferrari 166 S (which won the 1948 Mille Miglia with Clemente Biondetti behind the wheel), Alfa Romeo 2500 (1950) and Lancia Aurelia (1952). The Cisitalia 202 Berlinetta (#105, 1951) was designed by Carrozzeria Scaglietti and built by Allemano.

For Fiat, Allemano created three Fiat 1100 TV (by Giovanni Michelotti, 1954), the Fiat 600 (1955-1958), a few Abarth 750, Fiat 850 and Fiat 2200. Some of the Fiat 600 designs were also used by Abarth and Siata.

For Maserati, it made 21 Maserati A6G/54 coupés; four coupés, including the 1957 prototype of Maserati 3500 GT and 22 Maserati 5000 GT coupés (1959-1965). All of them designed by Michelotti.

For ATS, it built the ATS 2500 GT (1963) designed by Franco Scaglione.

There was also a Jaguar XK140; an Aston Martin DB2/4 (1953); a Panhard Dyna; as well as Renault Dauphine specials.

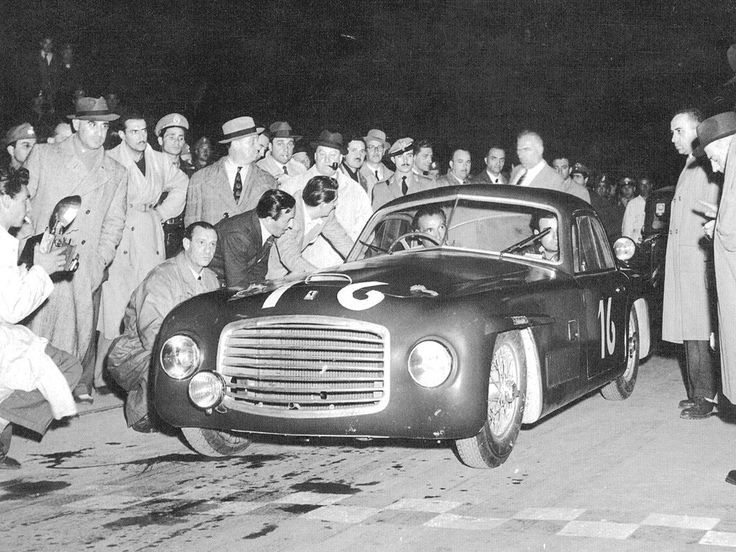
An Allemano bodied Ferrari 166 S winning the 1948 Mille Miglia in Italy

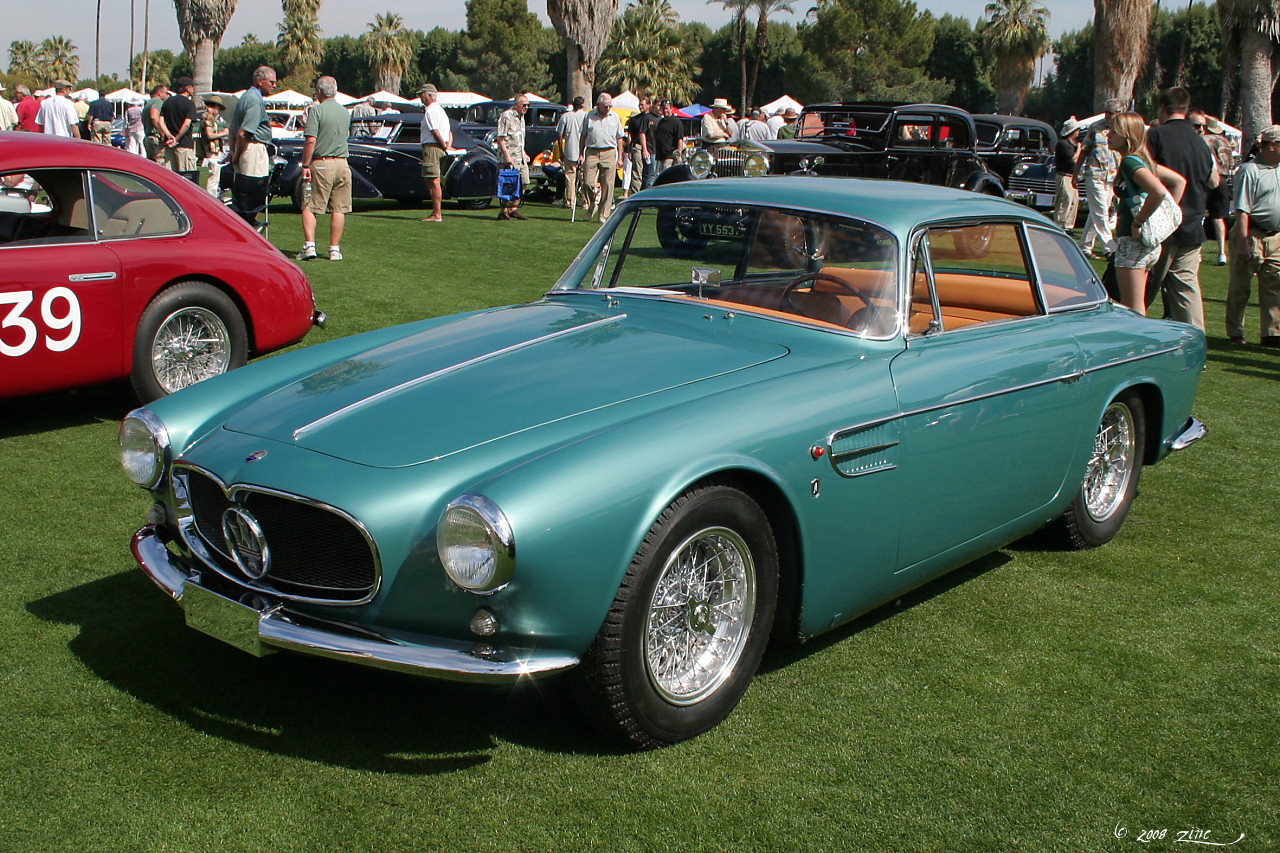
Maserati A6G 2000 Coupé

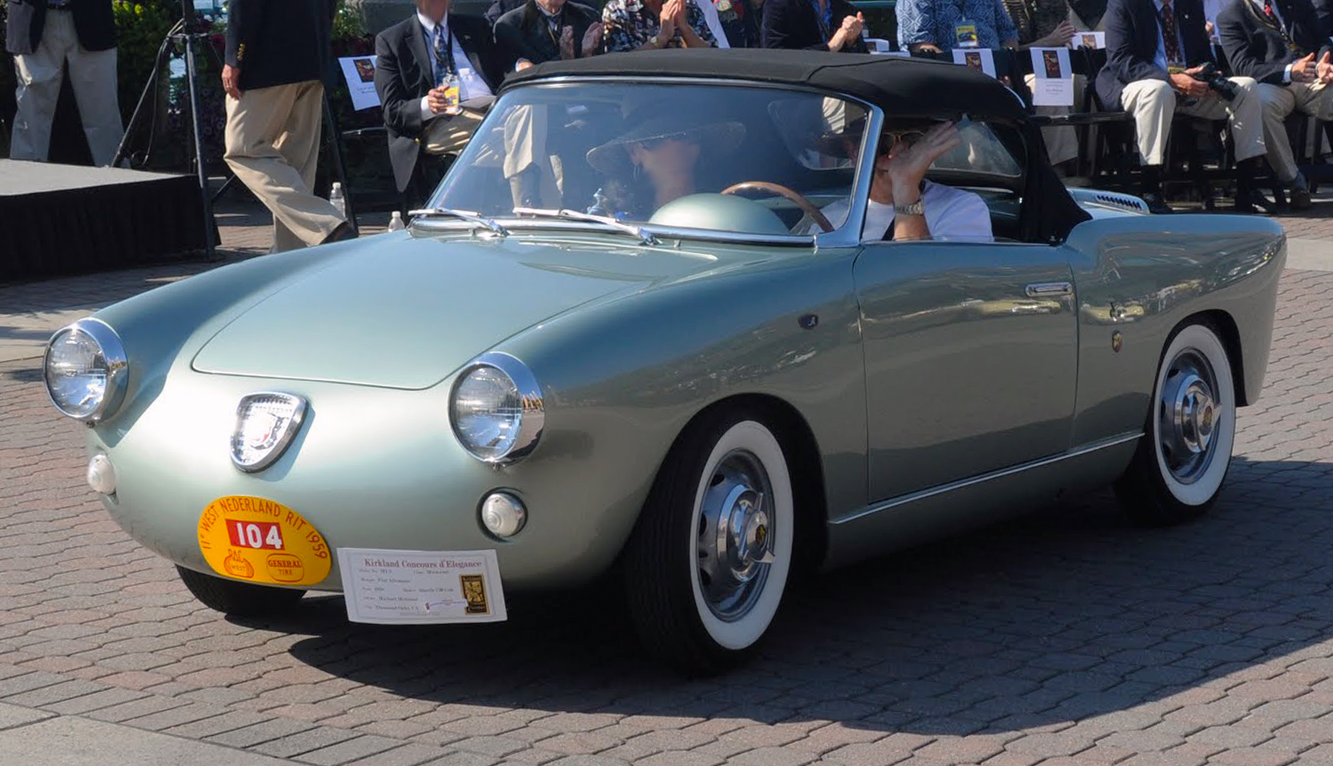
Abarth 750

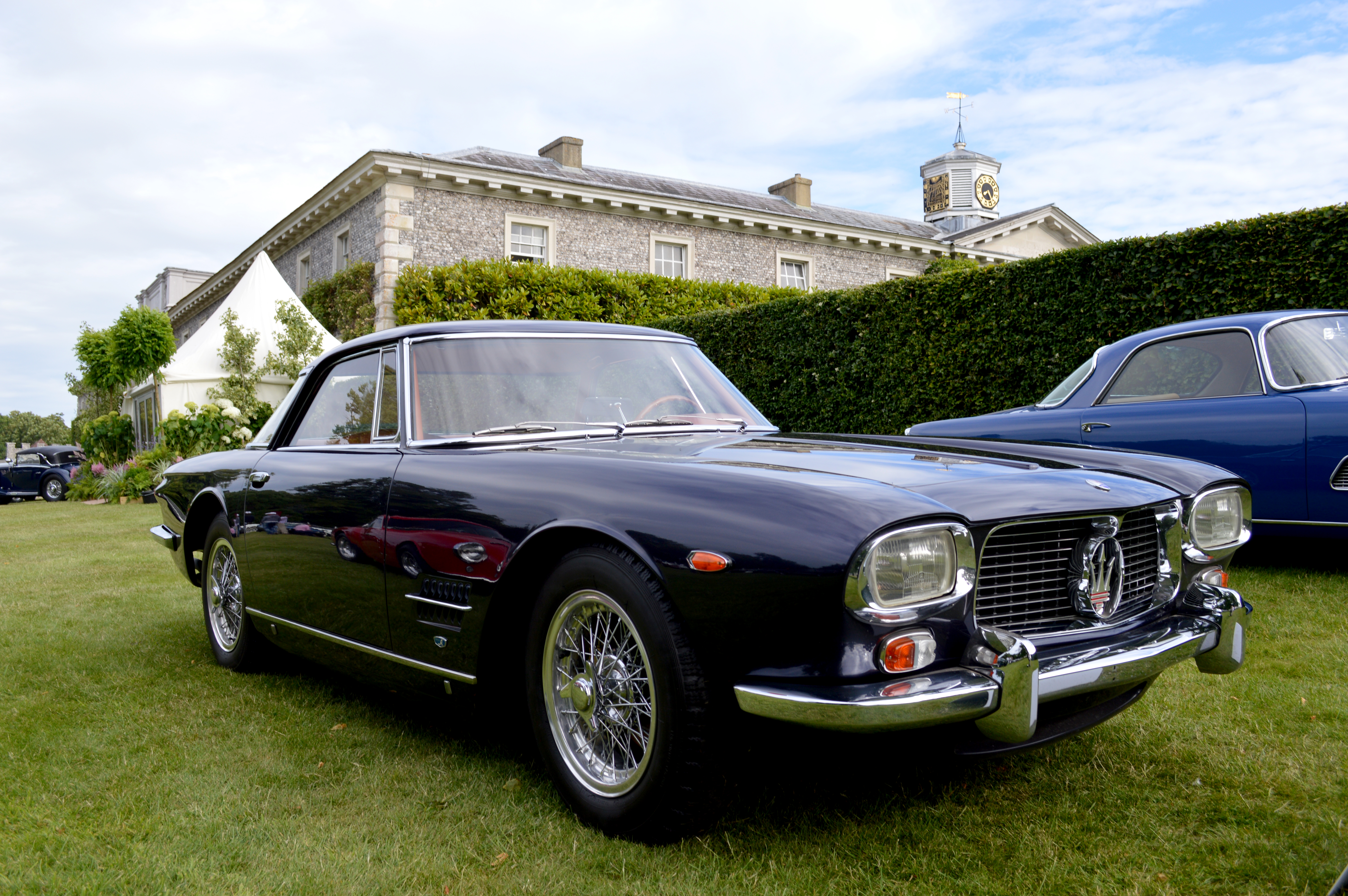
Maserati 5000 GT

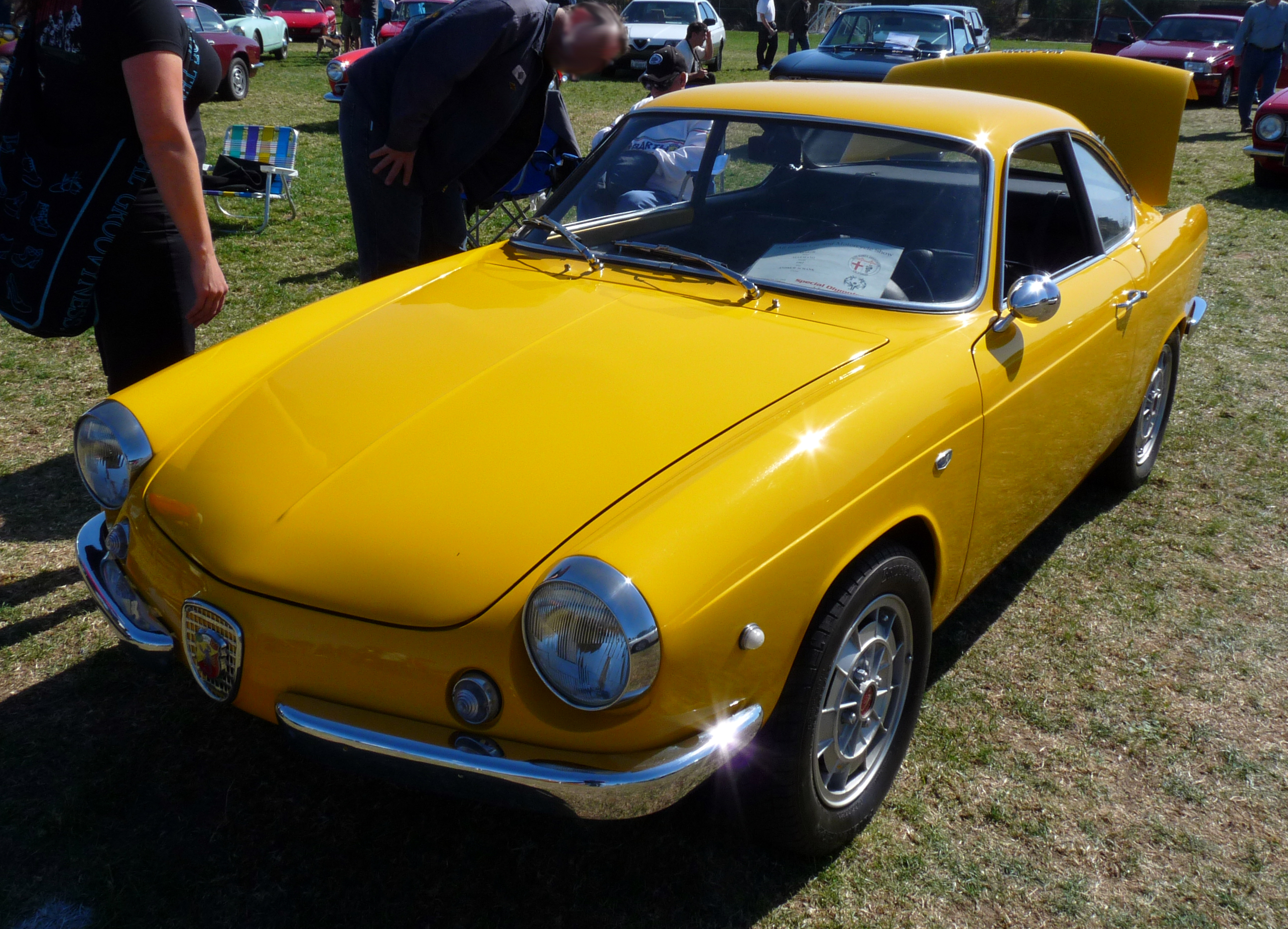
Abarth 1000 Scorpione Coupé

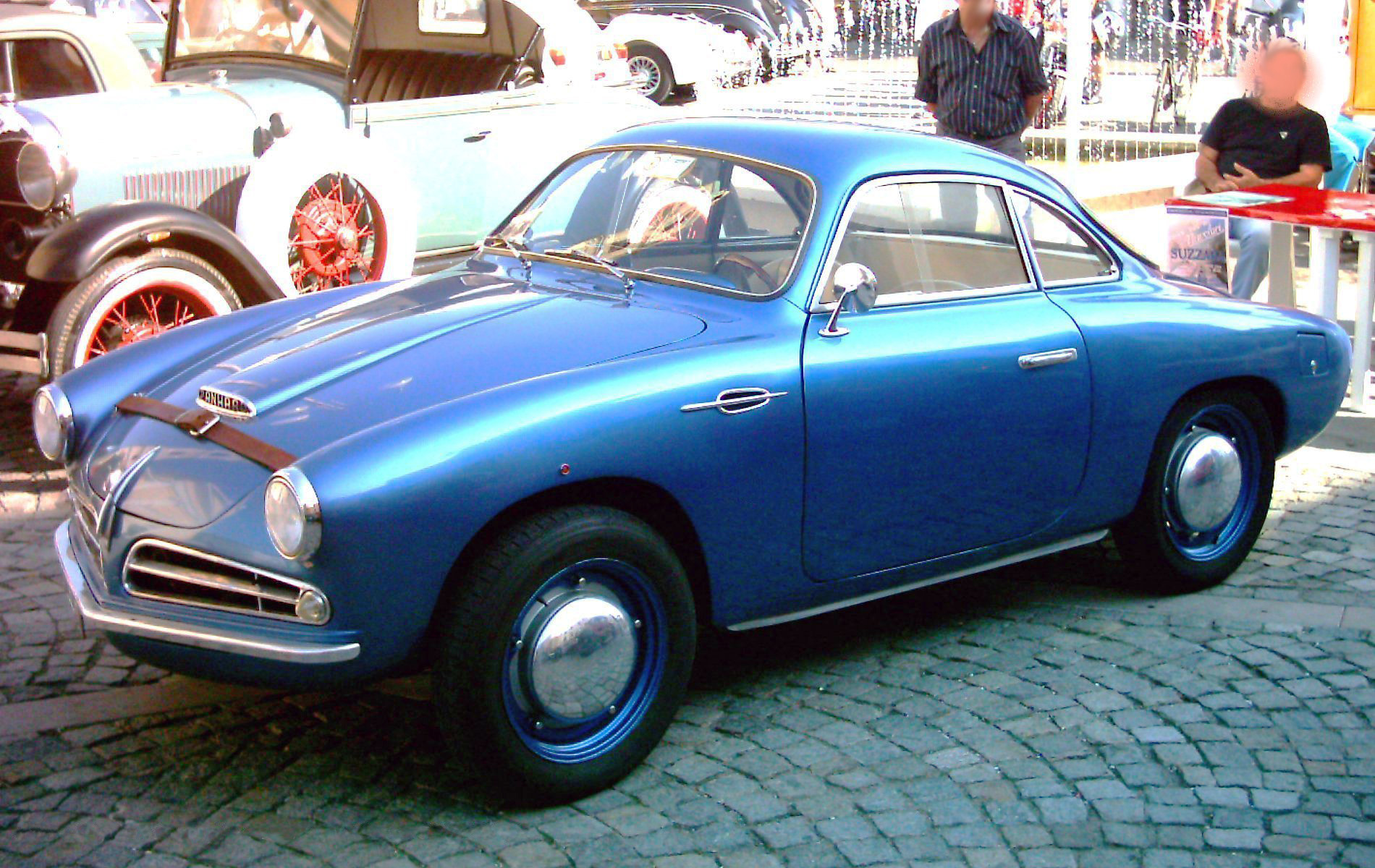
Panhard Dyna

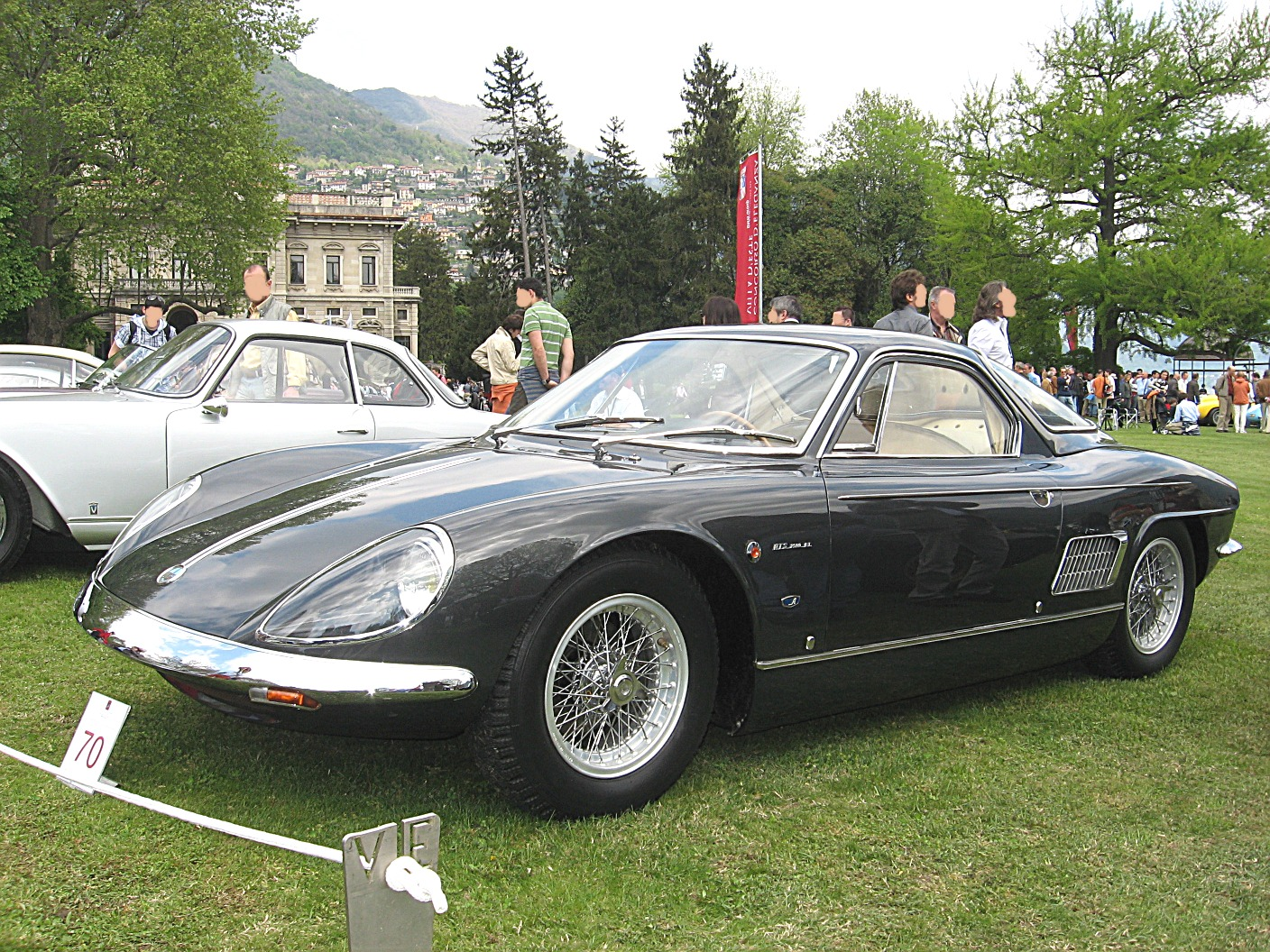
ATS 2500 GT

== Notable designers ==
- Giovanni Michelotti
- Franco Scaglione
- Giovanni Savonuzzi

== See also ==
- Motor vehicle manufacturers based in Turin
