= 6 Hours of Monza =

Endurance sports car event

(Italy) 6 Hours of Monza 6 Ore di Monza (Italian)

FIA World Endurance Championship
- Venue: Autodromo Nazionale di Monza
- First race: 1949
- First WEC race: 2021
- Duration: 6 hours
- Previous names: Coppa Inter-Europa; Supercortemaggiore; 1000 km of Monza
- Most wins (driver): Jacky Ickx (3)
- Most wins (team): Scuderia Ferrari (9)
- Most wins (manufacturer): Ferrari (18)

The 6 Hours of Monza (formerly the 1,000 Kilometres of Monza and known after 1966 as the Trofeo Filippo Caracciolo) is an endurance race, mainly for sports cars, which is held at the Autodromo Nazionale di Monza in Italy.

== Overview ==
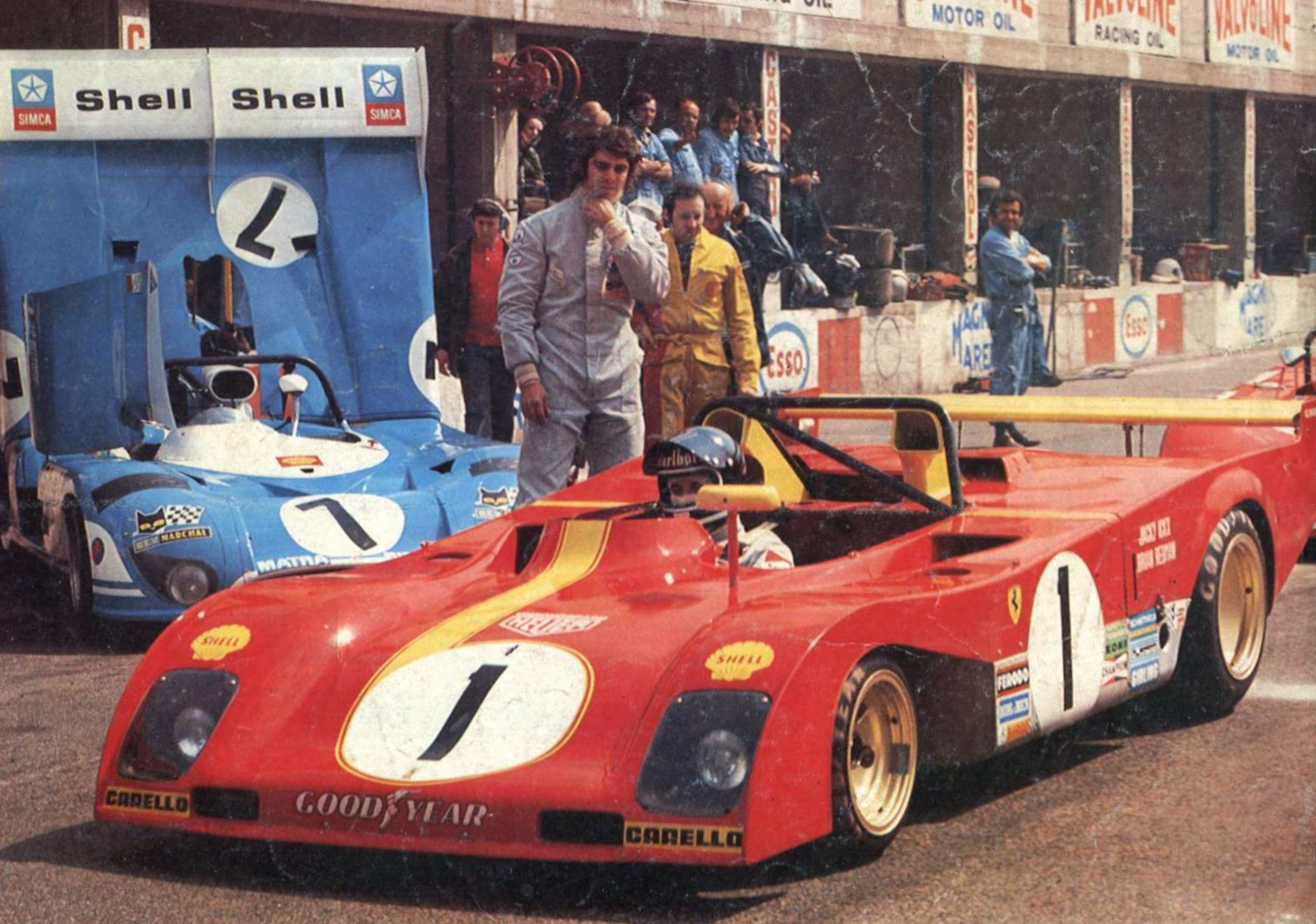
Jacky Ickx seated inside a Ferrari during the 1973 edition: the most winning driver, team and manufacturer in Monza's endurance race.

Despite its title, the race has been run at shorter lengths (most notably in the late 1970s and early 1990s, before the demise of the World Sportscar Championship in 1992). The Coppa Intereuropa was first held in 1949 on a 6.300 km (3.915 mi) circuit. The race length was expanded to 1,000 km in 1954; in 1956, it was held on a 10.000 km (6.214 mi) circuit. The race was shortened and returned to the 6.3-km track the following year. In 1960 and 1961, it was part of the FIA GT Cup.

In 1963, the race was held as a three-hour event for production-based cars in the World Sportscar Championship before its expansion to 1,000 km in 1965. Until 1969, the full Monza circuit (including the banked oval) was used. To slow the cars, chicanes were installed in 1965 at the beginning of the second bank (the south curve) and in 1966 at the beginning of the other bank. A lap was 10.100 km (6.276 mi) long, for a total distance of 1,010 km (100 laps). From 1970, the shorter 5.793 km (3.600 mi) Grand Prix circuit has been used occasionally..

Up until 1970, drivers waited at their starting grids until the Italian tricolour flag waved and drove away, a standing start. Since 1971, a rolling start began the race. Cars do one formation lap around the course; when the safety car returns to the pits, the starter waves the Italian flag to start it.

== History ==
- 1976 – the World Sportscar Championship was split into two series. The first, for production-based cars, was called the World Championship for Makes. The second, for prototype cars, was called the World Sports Car Championship. The Monza race was eligible for the latter in 1976 and 1977.
- 1978 – the World Sports Car Championship was cancelled and the race was reconfigured for 320 km, making it eligible for the European Sportscar Championship.
- 1979 – after the European Championship was cancelled, the race was eligible for the Italian championship.
- 1980 – the race again became eligible for the World Sportscar Championship.
- 1989 – it was cancelled due to financial problems with the Automobile Club of Milan and for the rebuilding of boxes and paddock facilities.
- 1992 – the race was used on and off by various series, including the BPR Global GT Series, the Italian GT Championship, and the Challenge Endurance Italia series in 1997 and 1998. The FIA Sportscar Championship hosted the 1,000 km in 2001.
- 1995 and 1996 – the race was valid for the BPR Global GT Series, reserved for GT cars with the four-hour format.
- 1998 – did not qualify for an international championship. It returned to the 1,000-kilometre distance, and was re-opened to sports cars.
- 1999 – the distance was reduced to 500 km, and it again became eligible for the international SportsRacing World Cup championship.
- 2000 – although the race was run at 500 km, it was called "1,000 km" because another 500-km race (for the FIA GT Championship) was held that morning.
- 2001 – returning to the 1,000 km distance, the race was eligible for the FIA Sportscar Championship.
- 2003 – after a year off, the race returned to the 500-kilometre distance.
- 2004 – the race was resumed as part of the Le Mans Series.
- 2006 – the race, part of the Le Mans Series, was cancelled due to protests about noise pollution.
- 2007 – agreements were reached to allow the event to return to the Le Mans Series.

The race was not held from 2009 to 2020, after which a six-hour race was scheduled as part of the 2021 FIA World Endurance Championship (WEC). Three races were held between 2021 and 2023, with the Italian round of WEC moving to Imola in 2024 due to redevelopment of the track. The Monza round is set to return for the 2026 FIA World Endurance Championship, replacing the Qatar 1812 km and 8 Hours of Bahrain.

== Winners ==
Year	Drivers	Team	Car	Time	Distance	Championship
6.3 km (3.9 mi) circuit
1949	(Italy) Bruno Sterzi	(Italy) Bruno Sterzi	Ferrari 166 S		392.867 km (244.116 mi)	Non-championship
1950	(Italy) Consalvo Sanesi		Alfa Romeo 6C 2500 Sperimentale	2:00:00.000	294.867 km (183.222 mi)	Non-championship
1951	(Italy) Luigi Villoresi	(Italy) Scuderia Ferrari	Ferrari 212 MM	2:00:00.000	286.940 km (178.296 mi)	Non-championship
1952	(Italy) Bruno Sterzi	(Italy) Bruno Sterzi	Ferrari 225 S	2:00:00.000	305.460 km (189.804 mi)	Non-championship
1953	(Italy) Luigi Villoresi	(Italy) Scuderia Ferrari	Ferrari 250 MM Berlinetta	2:30:49.700	441.000 km (274.025 mi)	Non-championship
1954	(United Kingdom) Mike Hawthorn (Italy) Umberto Maglioli	(Italy) Scuderia Ferrari	Ferrari 735 S	6:13:28.600	1,000 km (620 mi)	Non-championship
1955	(France) Jean Behra (Italy) Luigi Musso	(Italy) Officine Alfieri Maserati	Maserati 300S	5:41:41.200	1,000 km (620 mi)	Non-championship
10.1 km (6.3 mi) circuit
1956	(United Kingdom) Mike Hawthorn (United Kingdom) Peter Collins	(Italy) Scuderia Ferrari	Ferrari 500 TR	5:07:13.900	1,000 km (620 mi)	Non-championship
5.8 km (3.6 mi) circuit
1957	(Italy) Camillo Luglio	(Italy) Cornelia Vassali	Ferrari 250 GT		166.796 km (103.642 mi)	Non-championship
1958	(Italy) Luigi Taramazzo		Ferrari 250 GT			Non-championship
1959	(Italy) Alfonso Thiele		Ferrari 250 GT		173.863 km (108.033 mi)	Non-championship
1960	(Italy) Carlo Mario Abate	(Italy) Scuderia Serenissima	Ferrari 250 GT SWB		518.055 km (321.904 mi)	FIA GT Cup
1961	(Belgium) Pierre Noblet	Pierre Noblet	Ferrari 250 GT SWB	3:00:00.000	533.327 km (331.394 mi)	FIA GT Cup
1962	No race					
1963	(United Kingdom) Roy Salvadori	(United Kingdom) David Brown	Aston Martin DP214	3:00:00.000	580.437 km (360.667 mi)	International Championship for GT Manufacturers
1964	(Netherlands) Rob Slotemaker	(Netherlands) Ben Pon	Porsche 904 GTS	3:00:00.000	550.094 km (341.813 mi)	International Championship for GT Manufacturers
10.1 km (6.3 mi) circuit
1965	(France) Jean Guichet (United Kingdom) Mike Parkes	(Italy) SpA Ferrari SEFAC	Ferrari 275 P2	4:56.08.000	1,000 km (620 mi)	International Championship for GT Manufacturers
1966	(United Kingdom) John Surtees (United Kingdom) Mike Parkes	(Italy) SpA Ferrari SEFAC	Ferrari 330 P3	6:05:11.600	1,000 km (620 mi)	International Manufacturers' Championship
1967	(Italy) Lorenzo Bandini (New Zealand) Chris Amon	(Italy) SpA Ferrari SEFAC	Ferrari 330 P4	5:07:43.000	1,000 km (620 mi)	International Manufacturers' Championship
1968	(United Kingdom) David Hobbs (Australia) Paul Hawkins	(United Kingdom) J.W. Automotive Engineering	Ford GT40 Mk.I	5:18:23.400	1,000 km (620 mi)	International Championship for Makes
1969	(Switzerland) Jo Siffert (United Kingdom) Brian Redman	(West Germany) Porsche System Engineering	Porsche 908LH	4:53:41.200	1,000 km (620 mi)	International Championship for Makes
5.8 km (3.6 mi) circuit
1970	(Mexico) Pedro Rodríguez (Finland) Leo Kinnunen	(United Kingdom) J.W. Automotive Engineering	Porsche 917K	4:18:01.700	1,000 km (620 mi)	International Championship for Makes
1971	(Mexico) Pedro Rodríguez (United Kingdom) Jackie Oliver	(United Kingdom) J.W. Automotive Engineering	Porsche 917K	4:14:32.600	1,000 km (620 mi)	International Championship for Makes
1972	(Belgium) Jacky Ickx (Switzerland) Clay Regazzoni	(Italy) SpA Ferrari SEFAC	Ferrari 312 PB	5:52:05.600	1,000 km (620 mi)	World Championship for Makes
1973	(Belgium) Jacky Ickx (United Kingdom) Brian Redman	(Italy) SpA Ferrari SEFAC	Ferrari 312 PB	4:04:34.400	1,000 km (620 mi)	World Championship for Makes
1974	(Italy) Arturo Merzario (United States) Mario Andretti	(Italy) Autodelta SpA	Alfa Romeo 33TT12	4:45:57:400	1,000 km (620 mi)	World Championship for Makes
1975	(Italy) Arturo Merzario (France) Jacques Laffite	(West Germany) Willi Kauhsen Racing Team	Alfa Romeo 33TT12	4:43:21.800	1,000 km (620 mi)	World Championship for Makes
1976	(Belgium) Jacky Ickx (West Germany) Jochen Mass	(West Germany) Martini Racing	Porsche 936	4:00:54.400	882.810 km (548.553 mi)	World Sportscar Championship
1977	(Italy) Vittorio Brambilla	(Italy) Autodelta SpA	Alfa Romeo 33SC12	2:40:06.000	500 km (310 mi)	World Sportscar Championship
1978	(West Germany) Reinhold Joest	(West Germany) Joest Racing-Liquymoly-	Porsche 908/3	1:51:17.300	320 km (200 mi)	European Sportscar Championship
1979	(Italy) Renzo Zorzi (Italy) Marco Capoferri		Lola T286-Ford	5:47:26.000	1,000 km (620 mi)	Italian Group 6 Championship
1980	(United Kingdom) Alain de Cadenet (South Africa) Desiré Wilson	Alain de Cadenet	De Cadenet-Ford	6:01:08.880 (Note: The 1980 race maintained the title of 1000km of Monza but was actually run over six hours.)	1,061.4 km (659.5 mi)	World Championship for Makes; Italian Group 6 Championship
1981	(West Germany) Edgar Dören (West Germany) Jürgen Lässig (West Germany) Gerhard Holup	(West Germany) Weralit Racing Team	Porsche 935 K3	6:33:48.000	1,000 km (620 mi)	World Endurance Championship
1982	(France) Henri Pescarolo (Italy) Giorgio Francia	(France) Automobiles Jean Rondeau	Rondeau M382-Ford	5:33:56.200	1,000 km (620 mi)	World Endurance Championship
1983	(France) Bob Wollek (Belgium) Thierry Boutsen	(West Germany) Joest Racing	Porsche 956	5:12:06.900	1,000 km (620 mi)	World Endurance Championship
1984	(West Germany) Stefan Bellof (United Kingdom) Derek Bell	(West Germany) Rothmans Porsche	Porsche 956	5:06:15.800	1,000 km (620 mi)	World Endurance Championship
1985	(West Germany) Manfred Winkelhock (Switzerland) Marc Surer	(West Germany) Kremer Racing-Porsche	Porsche 962C	4:04:41.310	800 km (500 mi) (Note: The 1985 race was scheduled for 1000km but was stopped early as trees had been blown onto the track.)	World Endurance Championship
1986	(West Germany) Hans-Joachim Stuck (United Kingdom) Derek Bell	(West Germany) Rothmans Porsche	Porsche 962C	1:48:40.290	360 km (220 mi)	World Sports Prototype Championship
1987	(United Kingdom) John Watson (Netherlands) Jan Lammers	(United Kingdom) Silk Cut Jaguar	Jaguar XJR-8	5:03:55.370	1,000 km (620 mi)	World Sports Prototype Championship
1988	(United Kingdom) Martin Brundle (United States) Eddie Cheever	(United Kingdom) Silk Cut Jaguar	Jaguar XJR-9	4:52:13.520	1,000 km (620 mi)	World Sports Prototype Championship
1989	Not held					
1990	(Italy) Mauro Baldi (France) Jean-Louis Schlesser	(West Germany) Team Sauber Mercedes	Mercedes-Benz C11	2:17:11.735	480 km (300 mi)	World Sports Prototype Championship
1991	(United Kingdom) Martin Brundle (United Kingdom) Derek Warwick	(United Kingdom) Silk Cut Jaguar	Jaguar XJR-14	2:05:42.844	430 km (270 mi)	World Sportscar Championship
1992	(United Kingdom) Geoff Lees (Japan) Hitoshi Ogawa	(Japan) Toyota Team Tom's	Toyota TS010	2:16:42.659	500 km (310 mi)	World Sportscar Championship
1993–1994	Not held					
1995	(Germany) Thomas Bscher (Denmark) John Nielsen	(United Kingdom) West Competition	McLaren F1 GTR	4:01:29.206	725 km (450 mi)	BPR Global GT Series
1996	(Germany) Thomas Bscher (Denmark) John Nielsen	(United Kingdom) West Competition	McLaren F1 GTR	4:01:31.046	736 km (457 mi)	BPR Global GT Series
1997	(Germany) Thomas Bscher (Denmark) John Nielsen	(Germany) Kremer Racing	Kremer K8 Spyder-Porsche	5:33:44.800	1,000 km (620 mi)	Challenge Endurance Italia
1998	(Germany) Thomas Bscher (United Kingdom) Geoff Lees	(United Kingdom) GTC Team Davidoff	McLaren F1 GTR	5:08:55.952	1,000 km (620 mi)	Italian GT Championship; Challenge Endurance Italia
1999	(France) Emmanuel Collard (Italy) Vincenzo Sospiri	(France) JB Giesse Team Ferrari	Ferrari 333 SP	2:29:31.944	500 km (310 mi)	SportsRacing World Cup
2000	(Italy) Mauro Baldi (South Africa) Gary Formato	(Italy) R & M	Riley & Scott Mk III-Judd	2:42:31.807	500 km (310 mi)	SportsRacing World Cup
2001	(Italy) Giovanni Lavaggi (United Kingdom) Christian Vann	(Monaco) GLV Brums	Ferrari 333 SP-Judd	5:17:08.756	1,000 km (620 mi)	FIA Sportscar Championship
2002	Not held					
2003	(Netherlands) Jan Lammers (Netherlands) John Bosch	(Netherlands) Racing For Holland	Dome S101-Judd	2:30:30.857	486.612 km (302.367 mi)	FIA Sportscar Championship
2004	(United Kingdom) Jamie Davies (United Kingdom) Johnny Herbert	(United Kingdom) Audi Sport UK Veloqx	Audi R8	5:05:52.043	1,000 km (620 mi)	Le Mans Endurance Series
2005	(France) Emmanuel Collard (France) Jean-Christophe Boullion	(France) Pescarolo Sport	Pescarolo C60 Hybrid-Judd	5:02:32.220	1,000 km (620 mi)	Le Mans Endurance Series
2006	Not held					
2007	(France) Nicolas Minassian (Spain) Marc Gené	(France) Team Peugeot Total	Peugeot 908 HDi FAP (Diesel)	4:59:20.735	1,000 km (620 mi)	Le Mans Series
2008	(France) Stéphane Sarrazin (Portugal) Pedro Lamy	(France) Team Peugeot Total	Peugeot 908 HDi FAP (Diesel)	4:59:07.955	1,000 km (620 mi)	Le Mans Series
2009–2020	Not held					
2021	(United Kingdom) Mike Conway (Japan) Kamui Kobayashi (Argentina) José María López	(Japan) Toyota Gazoo Racing	Toyota GR010 Hybrid	6:01:12.290	1,181.45 km (734.12 mi)	FIA World Endurance Championship
2022	(France) Nicolas Lapierre (Brazil) André Negrão (France) Matthieu Vaxivière	(France) Alpine Elf Team	Alpine A480	6:00:47.738	1,123.53 km (698.13 mi)	FIA World Endurance Championship
2023	(United Kingdom) Mike Conway (Japan) Kamui Kobayashi (Argentina) José María López	(Japan) Toyota Gazoo Racing	Toyota GR010 Hybrid	6:00:31.922	1,158.28 km (719.72 mi)	FIA World Endurance Championship
2024–2025	Not held					
2026	(New Zealand) Earl Bamber (France) Sébastien Bourdais (United Kingdom) Jack Aitken	(United States) Cadillac Hertz Team Jota	Cadillac V-Series.R	6:01.33.199	1,106.463 km (687.524 mi)	FIA World Endurance Championship
