= Maserati 5000 GT =

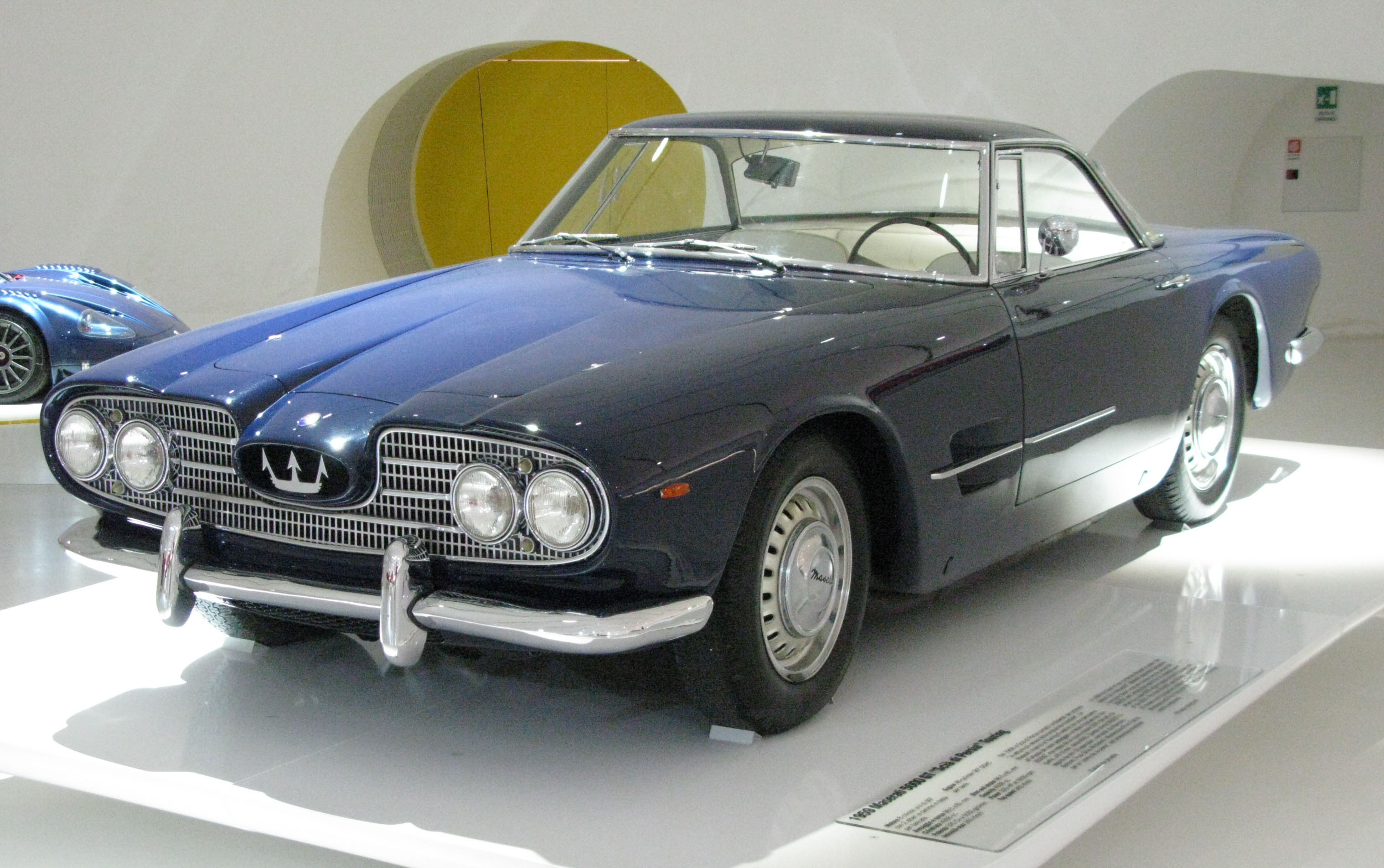
- Maserati 5000 GT "Scia di Persia"

Overview
- Manufacturer: Maserati
- Production: 1959–1966; 34 units
- Assembly: Italy: Modena
- Designer: Federico Formenti at Carrozzeria Touring (original design); Giovanni Michelotti at Carrozzeria Allemano (later production cars)

Body and chassis
- Class: Grand tourer (S)
- Body style: 2-door coupé
- Layout: Front-engine, rear-wheel-drive
- Related: Maserati 3500 GT

Powertrain
- Engine: 4.9 L (4,937 cc) V8; 4.9 L (4,940 cc) V8 (1960 onwards)
- Transmission: 4-speed ZF manual; 5-speed ZF manual (1960 onwards)

Dimensions
- Wheelbase: 2,600 mm (102.4 in)
- Curb weight: 1,652 kg (3,642 lb) (dry)

Chronology
- Successor: Maserati Ghibli (AM115)

The Maserati 5000 GT (Tipo 103) is a 2-door coupé grand tourer, made by Italian automobile manufacturer Maserati from 1959–1966. A total of thirty-four were produced with bodies made by eight different Italian coach builders.

The first car in the Tipo 103 series was the Scia di Persia (Shah of Persia), delivered to Mohammad Reza Pahlavi, who had been impressed by the Maserati 3500 after a test drive but demanded a more exclusive car for himself. He commissioned Maserati's chief engineer Giulio Alfieri to fit a slightly modified 5-litre engine from the Maserati 450S in the 3500GT's chassis. Carrozzeria Touring developed the superleggera tubing and aluminium body of the two-seater coupé. The second car, also known as the Scia di Persia by Touring, was displayed at the 1959 Salone dell'automobile di Torino.

In 2018, Carrozzeria Touring Superleggera announced the creation of a homage to the 5000 GT with a Maserati GranTurismo-based Sciàdipersia. A total of 25 cars were made (coupé and cabriolet combined).

== History ==
In an attempt to revive sales, Omar Orsi, the son of then Maserati owner Adolfo Orsi, mailed sales brochures of the 3500 GT and the 450S to prospective wealthy buyers. One brochure was also mailed to the Shah of Iran who scheduled a meeting with Maserati management in late 1958. After taking a test drive in a 3500 GT, the Shah requested Giulio Alfieri to make a road car combining the usability of the 3500 GT with the power of the 450S and offered to fund the development and build costs. The engine received little modifications for road usage, those being an increased displacement of 4,937 cc (4.9 L) and a reduced compression ratio of 8.5:1. The chassis of the 3500 GT was strengthened to better handle the power of the new V8 engine but some components from the 3500 GT remained; the independent live axles and the braking system.

Initially, Bertone was chosen as the coach builder for the body but Carrozzeria Touring was ultimately chosen at the behest of Orsi. The coach builder was given instructions to make the car look distinct from the 3500 GT it was based on. Chief designer Carlo Anderloni used the Persian Baroque architecture as inspiration for the unique grille design and the interior design. The finished car was immediately shipped to the Shah of Iran with little to no exposure to the public. A second car was built to be displayed at the 1959 Turin Motor show which was bought by South African millionaire and Kyalami track owner Basil Read.

In 1960, the engine was modified following an increase in demand: the displacement increased to 4,940 cc (301 cu in) with a longer stroke and a smaller bore, with fuel injection and triple-strand chains added. The new engine developed 340 hp (345 PS; 254 kW). The fuel injected 5000 GT was shown at the 1960 Salone di Torino. A new 5-speed ZF transaxle was added with an overdrive gear to better cope with the modifications and ventilated disc brakes were added all around.

== Specifications ==
Specifications for the first 5000 GT were:

- Maserati 450S-derived four OHC 4,937 cc (301 cu in) V8, 325 hp (242 kW) at 5,500 rpm
- Lucas mechanical injection or four 45 DCOE Weber carburettors and dual fuel pump
- mechanical Magneti-Marelli ignition, dual spark plug
- 4-speed manual transmission ZF (later 5-speed)
- Front discs, rear drums (later all discs)

== Coachbuilders ==
After the first body by Touring, the main body partner since 1960 became Carrozzeria Allemano which made 22 cars, designed by Giovanni Michelotti. Other coachbuilders were as follows:

- Pietro Frua - 3 cars
- Carrozzeria Monterosa - 2 cars
- Pininfarina (designed by Aldo Brovarone) - 1 car
- Ghia (Sergio Sartorelli) - 1 car
- Bertone (Giorgetto Giugiaro) - 1 car
- Carrozzeria Touring - 2 more cars other than the initial 2 produced
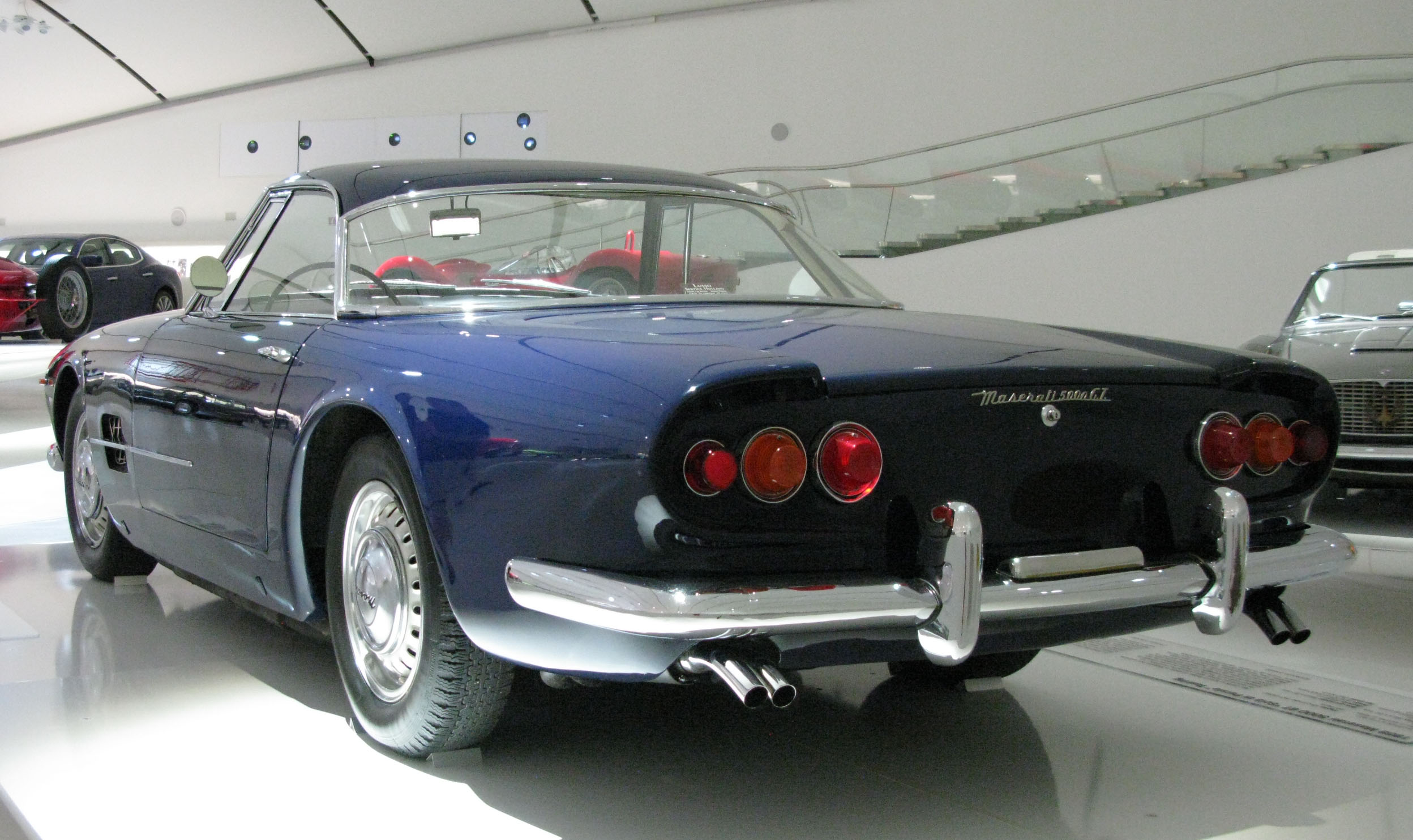
Touring, ex-Shah chassis 103.002

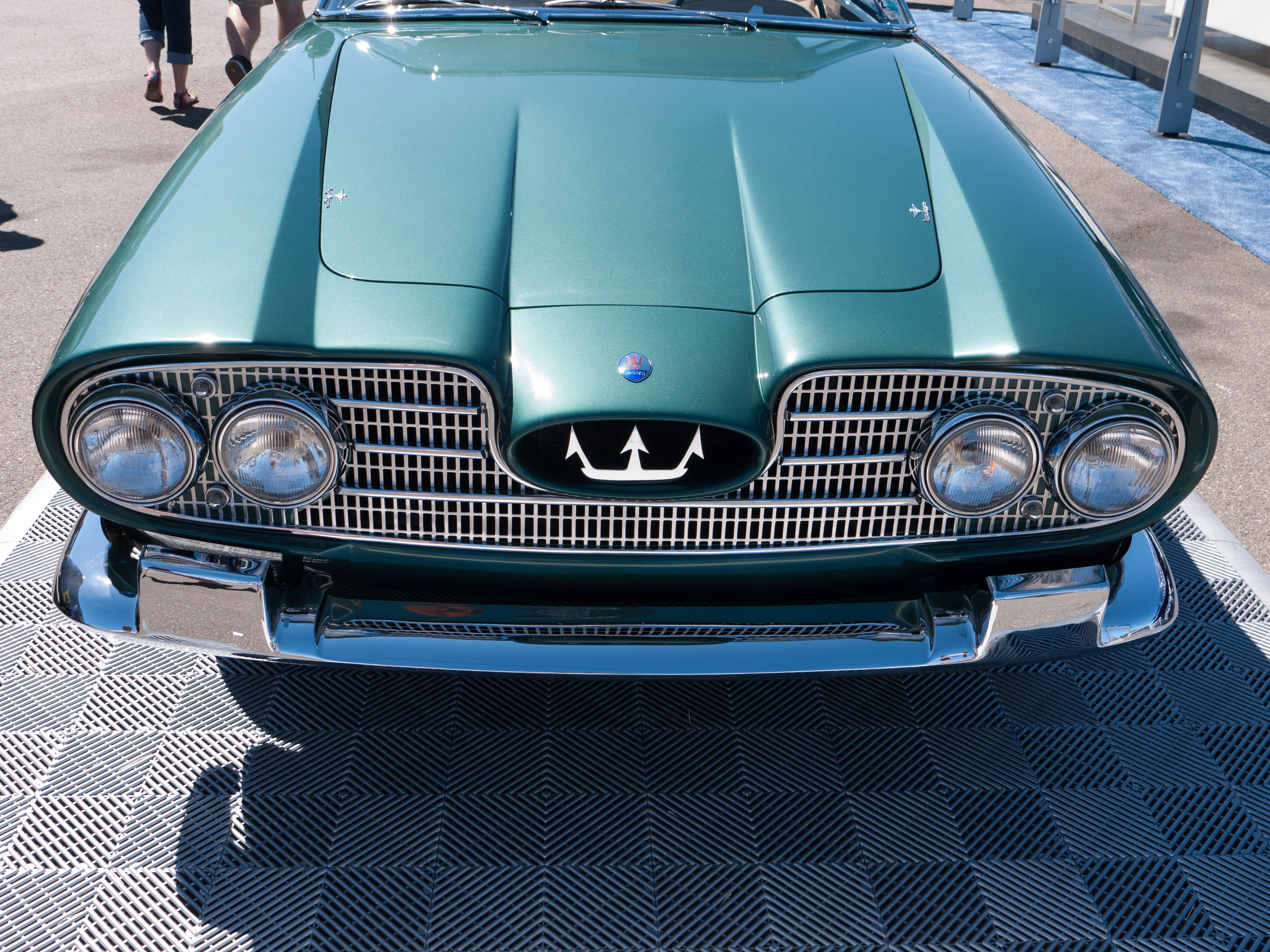
Touring, ex-Basil Read, chassis 103.004

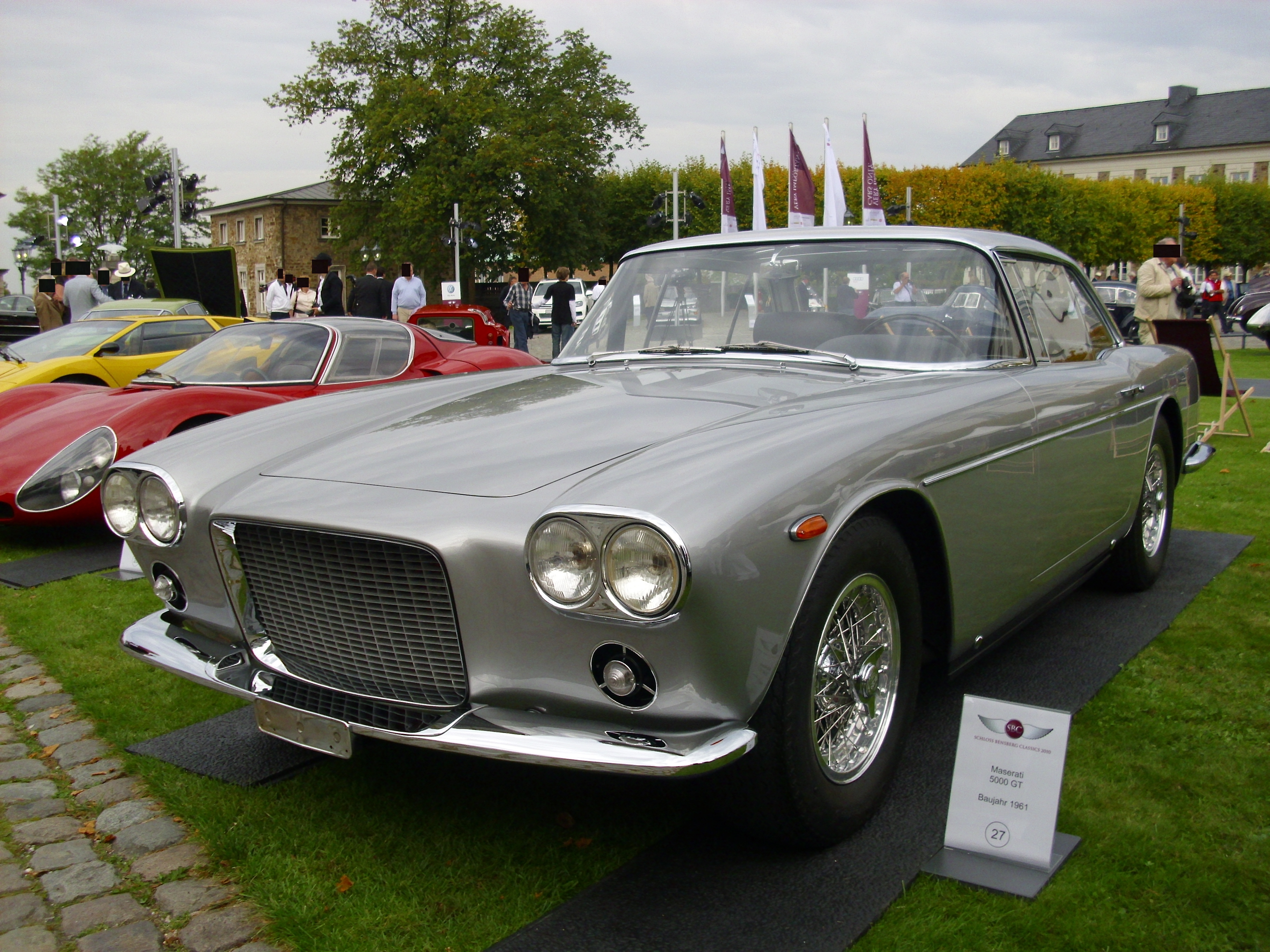
Pininfarina, ex-Gianni Agnelli, 103.008

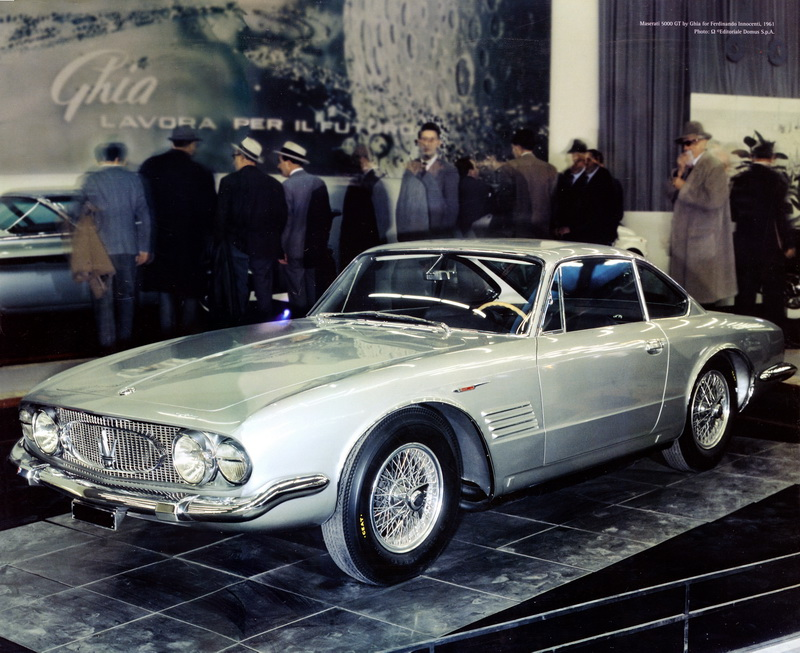
Ghia at Turin Auto Show 1961, 103.018

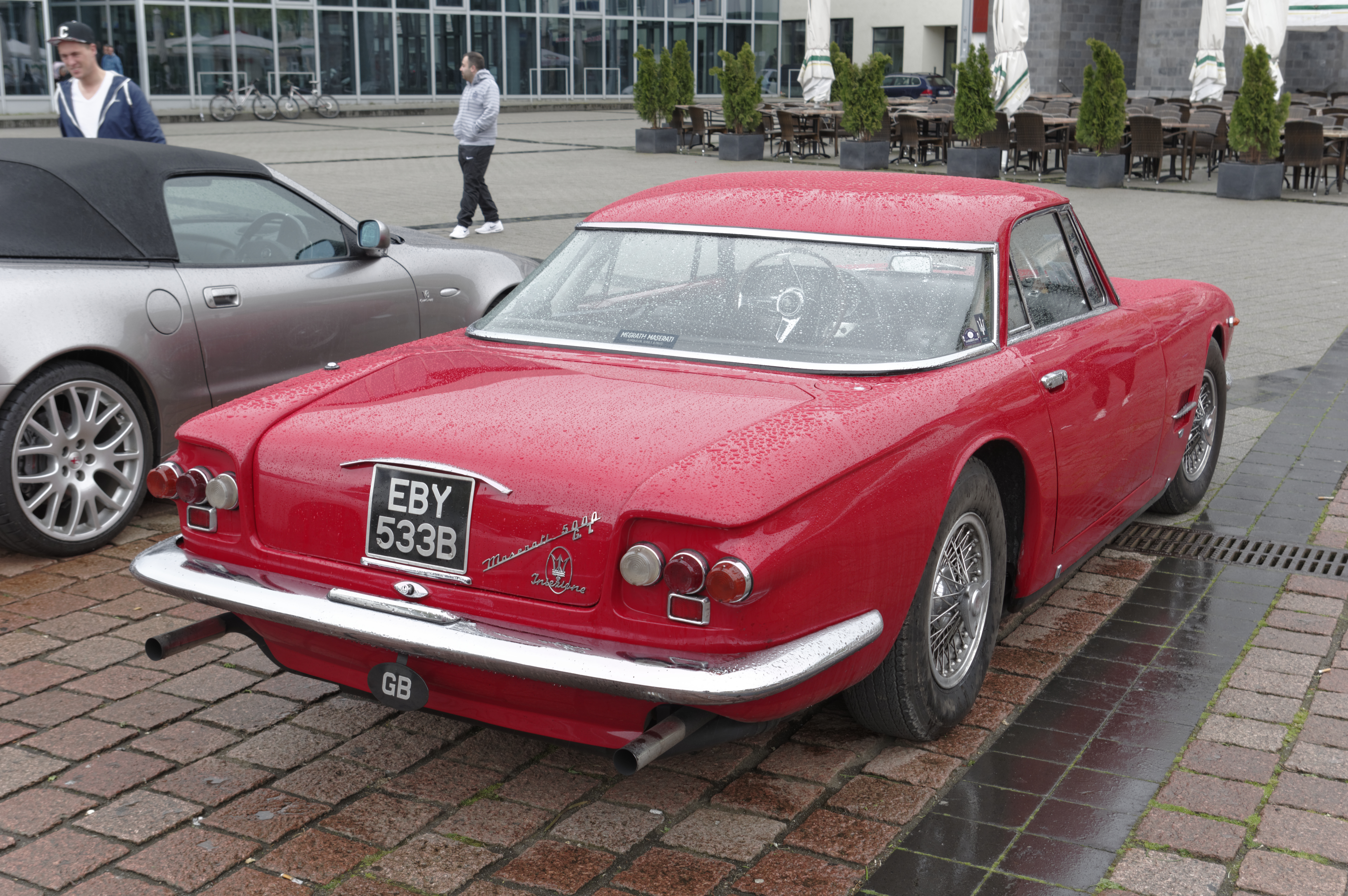
Allemano, ex-Joe Walsh, 103.026

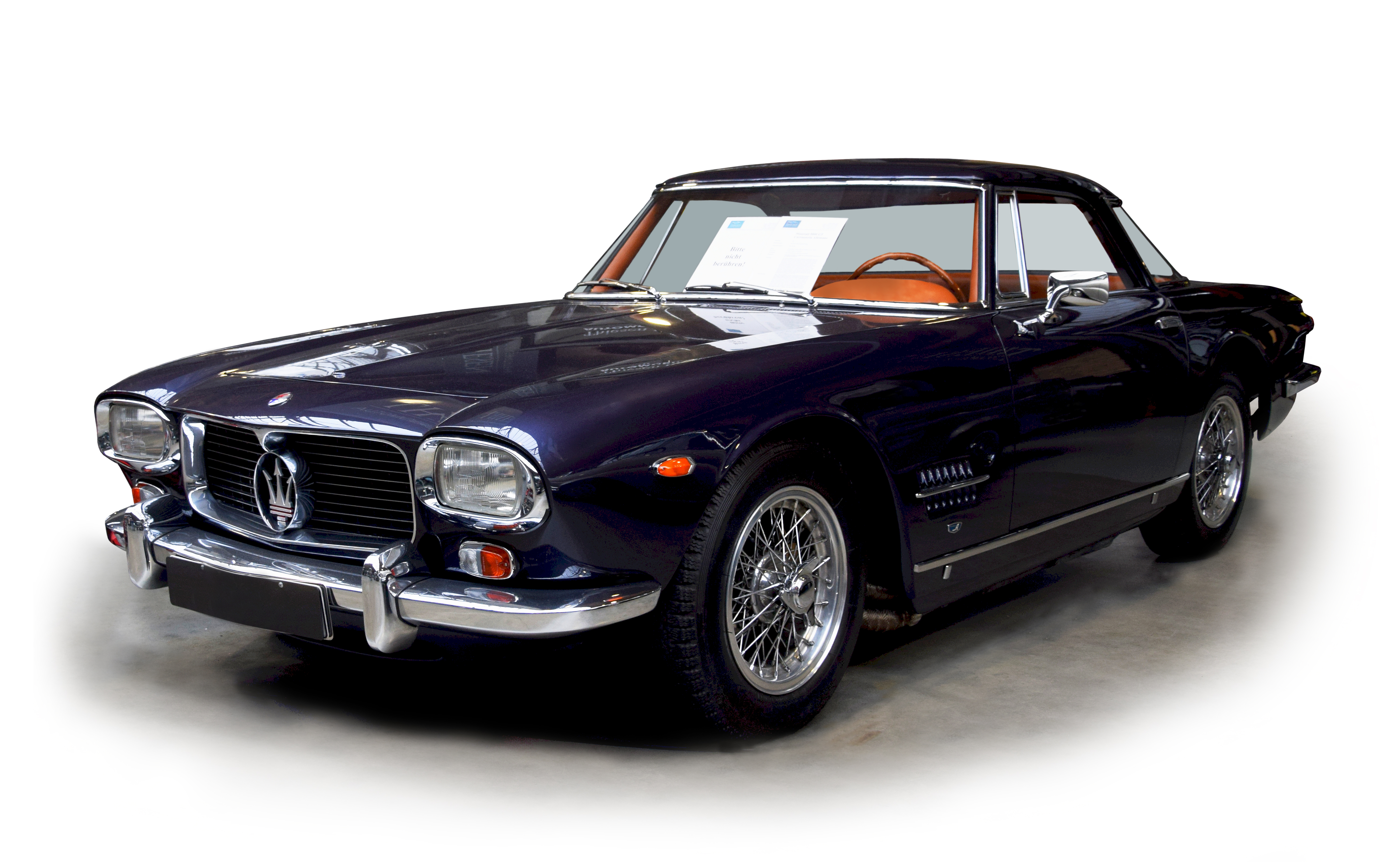
Allemano, ex-Stewart Granger, 103.036

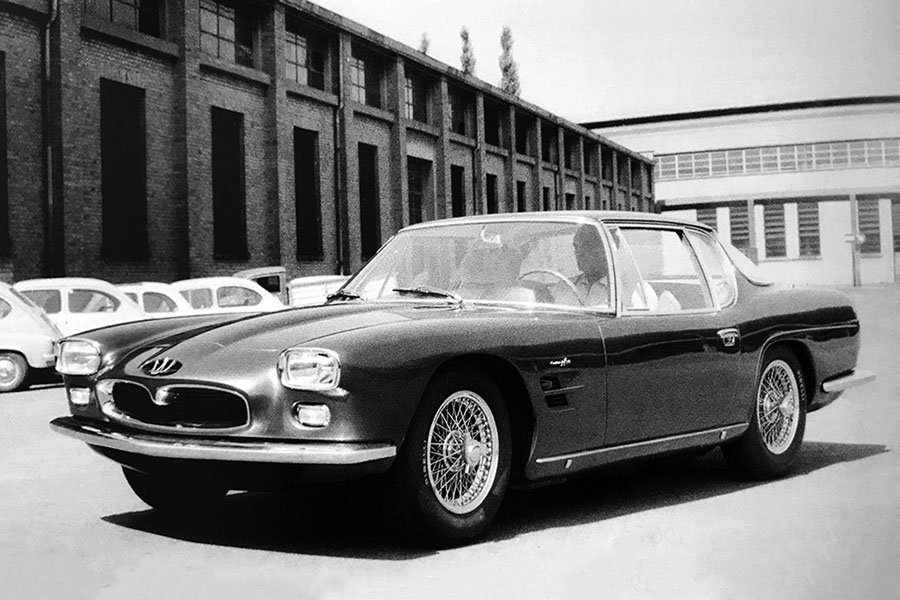
Frua, ex-Aga Khan IV, 103.060

In 1961, Bertone built a one-off 5000 GT that featured a body designed by Giorgetto Giugiaro. The car had a Tipo 104 chassis and a different engine than the standard 5000 GT.

== Buyers ==
The 5000 GT was sold at prices around US$17,000 (twice the cost of a Maserati 3500), and in many respects individualized to the desires of its celebrity buyers, including Karim Aga Khan, Italian industrialist Gianni Agnelli, American sportsman Briggs Cunningham, actor Stewart Granger, Italian businessman Ferdinando Innocenti (Ghia-bodied 5000 GT), South African construction magnate Basil Read, Swiss entrepreneur Otto Nef, count Giuseppe Comola, American Musician Joe Walsh, and Mexican president Adolfo López Mateos.
