= List of automobile races in Italy =

Grand Prix and other major automobile races in Italy.

- 10 Hours of Messina
- Adriana Grand Prix
- Alessandria Grand Prix
- Bari Grand Prix
- Circuito di Avellino
- Circuito del Garda
- Coppa Acerbo
  - Pescara Grand Prix
- Coppa Ciano
- Coppa della Toscana
- Coppa Florio
- Coppa d'Oro di Sicilia
- Coppa d'Oro delle Dolomiti
- Giro di Sicilia automobilistico
- Giro d'Italia automobilistico
- International Rally of Messina
- Monza Circuit
  - Grand Prix of Italy
- Grand Prix of Modena
- Grand Prix of Naples
- Grand Prix of Rome
- Grand Prix of Turin
- Mediterranean Grand Prix
- Messina Grand Prix
- Milan Grand Prix
- Mille Miglia
- Mugello Circuit
  - Grand Prix of Mugello
- Rally d'Italia
  - Rally di Sanremo (1970–2003)
  - Rally di Sardegna (2004–2018)
- Sardegna Rally Race
- Imola Circuit
  - San Marino Grand Prix
- San Remo Grand Prix
- Syracuse Grand Prix
- Targa Florio
