= Igor Troubetzkoy =

French aristocrat and athlete (1912–2008)

- Full name: Igor Nikolayevich Troubetzkoy; Russian: Игорь Николаевич Трубецкой
- Born: 23 August 1912; Paris, France
- Died: 20 December 2008 (aged 96); Nice, France
- Noble family: Trubetskoy
- Spouse: Barbara Hutton (m. 1947; div. 1951)
- Issue: Arnaud Marie Troubetzkoy
- Father: Prince Nikolai Nikolaievich Troubetzkoy
- Mother: Countess Jekaterina Mikhailovna Mussin-Pushkin
- Occupation: Athlete

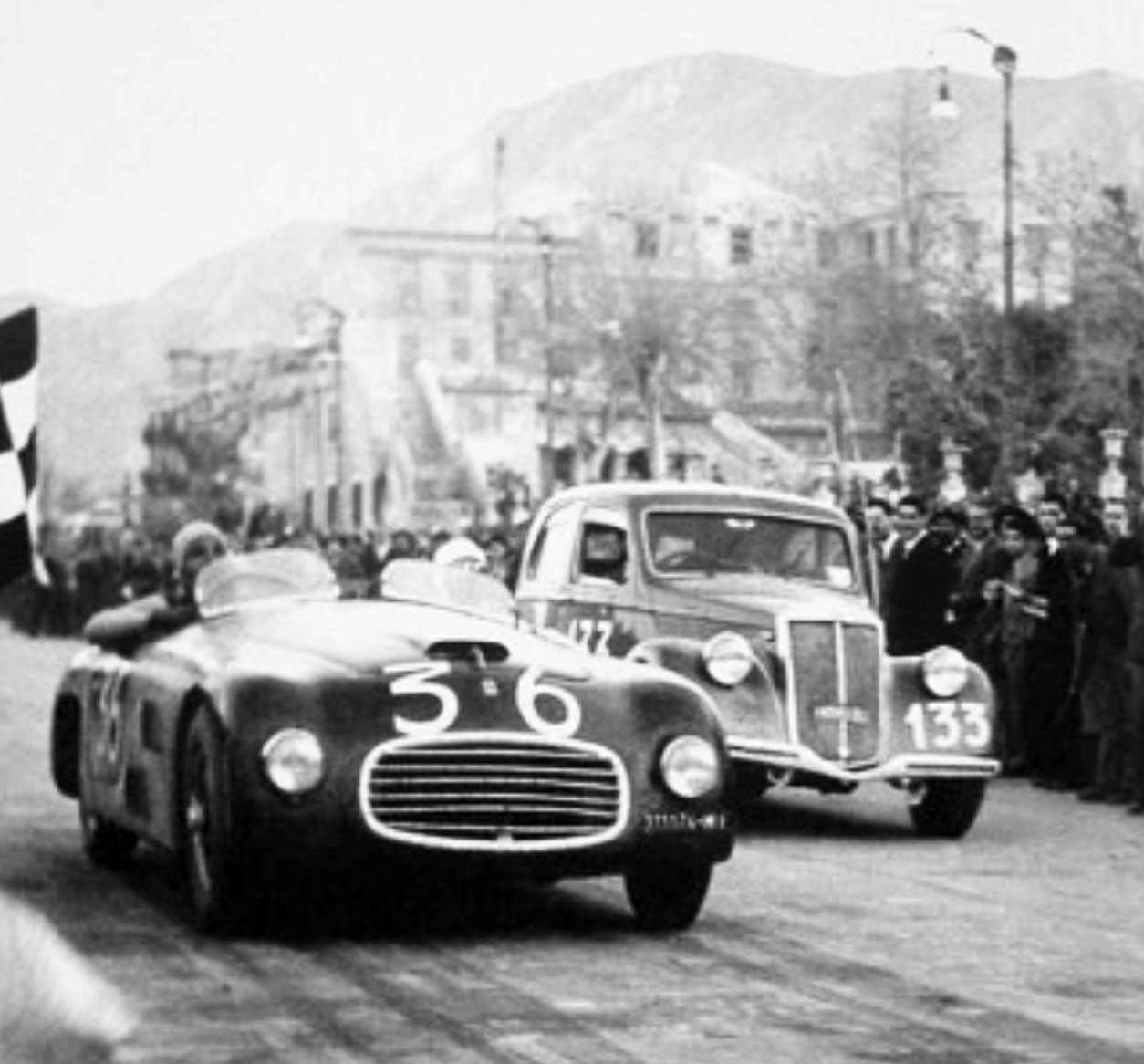
Igor Troubetzkoy and Clemente Biondetti winning Targa Florio on Sicily (April 3, 1948) in a Ferrari 166 S (#001S).

Prince Igor Nikolayevich Troubetzkoy (Russian: Игорь Николаевич Трубецкой; 23 August 1912 – 20 December 2008) was a French aristocrat and athlete (skiing, cycling, car racing) of Russian descent. He was styled His Serene Highness, but did not use the style often.

== Early life and family ==
Prince Igor Nikolayevich Troubetzkoy was born on 23 August 1912 in Paris, France. He was a member of the princely Trubetskoy family. His brother, Youcca Troubetzkoy, was an actor in French films during the 1920s and 1930s.

== Career ==
Being a good skier and athlete (cycling) in younger years, Igor started automobile racing in 1947 in a Simca-Gordini, taking a bronze at the Coupe de l'Agaci (Oct 26, 1947).

With Count Bruno Sterzi he started the Scuderia Inter racing team in 1947 and bought three Ferrari 166 S, among the first cars made by Ferrari:

- Spider Corsa, #006I open 2-seater by Allemano, cycle fenders and lamps (raced by Clemente Biondetti and Tazio Nuvolari in his last Mille Miglia)
- Spider Corsa, #010I (ex-#01C) open 1-seater track car. Igor raced this car in 1948.
- Spider Sport, #001S by Allemano, open 2-seater, road-registered in which Igor won Targa Florio (April 3, 1948) with Clemente Biondetti.

He retired from racing due to an accident at Circuit d'Albi (August 29, 1948). Sterzi had left the Scuderia and it ceased to exist, but the name was used for Ferrari 166 Inter, the company's first Grand Touring car.

== Personal life ==
He was married to American heiress Barbara Hutton in March 1947 and inspired her son from an earlier marriage, Lance Reventlow, to take up racing. After his divorce from Hutton in 1951, Igor took up painting. In 1953, he fathered a son, Arnaud Marie, who in the 1970s started Troubetzkoy Paintings (Paris, New York City) that makes replica paintings.
