= Clemente Biondetti =

Italian racing driver (1898–1955)

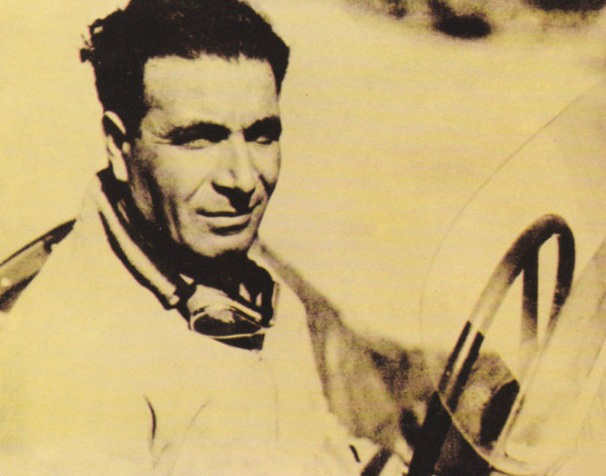
- Biondetti in 1938
- Born: 18 October 1898; Buddusò, Italy
- Died: 24 February 1955 (aged 56); Florence, Italy

Formula One World Championship career
- Nationality: (Italy) Italian
- Active years: 1950
- Team: privateer Ferrari
- Entries: 1
- Championships: 0
- Wins: 0
- Podiums: 0
- Career points: 0
- Pole positions: 0
- Fastest laps: 0
- First entry: 1950 Italian Grand Prix

Clemente Biondetti (18 October 1898 – 24 February 1955) was an Italian auto racing driver. Born into a working-class family, Biondetti raced motorcycles before turning to automobiles where he had greater success.

== Biography ==
Born in Buddusò, Sardinia, into a working-class family, Biondetti began his racing career in motorcycles in 1923 but in 1927 turned to automobiles. He was nicknamed "The Wolf of Tuscany". By 1931 his performance earned him a spot in Grand Prix motor racing with the Maserati factory team.

Biondetti's success racing on circuits was minimal, but he was one of the best in tough endurance events. Driving an Alfa Romeo 8C 2900b, Clemente Biondetti won the 1938 Mille Miglia for sports cars and at the Coppa Ciano finished second in the voiturette class then third in the main event. In 1939, he won the Coppa Acerbo voiturette class and took second place at the Swiss Grand Prix. His racing career came to a halt following the outbreak of World War II in 1940. By the time he was able to resume racing after the war, he was already 49 years old. Nevertheless, he dominated Italian endurance racing, driving to victory in the Mille Miglia for three straight years from 1947 through 1949 and the Targa Florio in 1948 and 1949. He won more Mille Miglias than any other driver in history.

Biondetti participated in one Formula One World Championship event, the 1950 Italian Grand Prix. Driving a self-built Ferrari-Jaguar hybrid car, engine problems forced him out of the race thus he failed to score any championship points. Biondetti loved racing cars and continued to compete in sports car and endurance events, earning a second-place finish in a Ferrari at the 12 Hours of Pescara in 1952 against much younger drivers. After suffering from cancer for a number of years, he was forced to retire in 1954. He succumbed to cancer on 24 February 1955 in Florence. As a result, he became the first Formula One World Championship driver to die of natural causes.

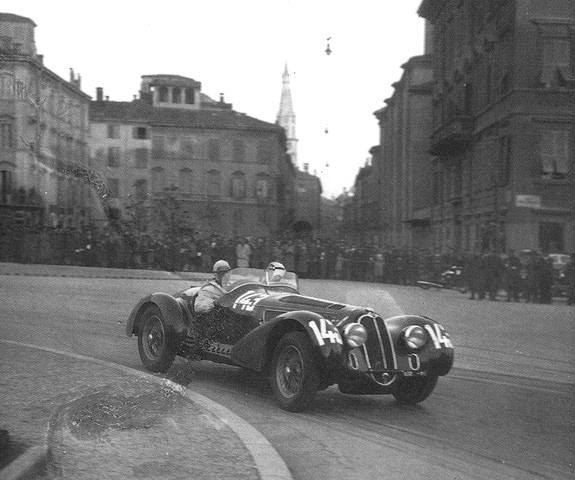
Biondetti and Stefano wins 1938 Mille Miglia.

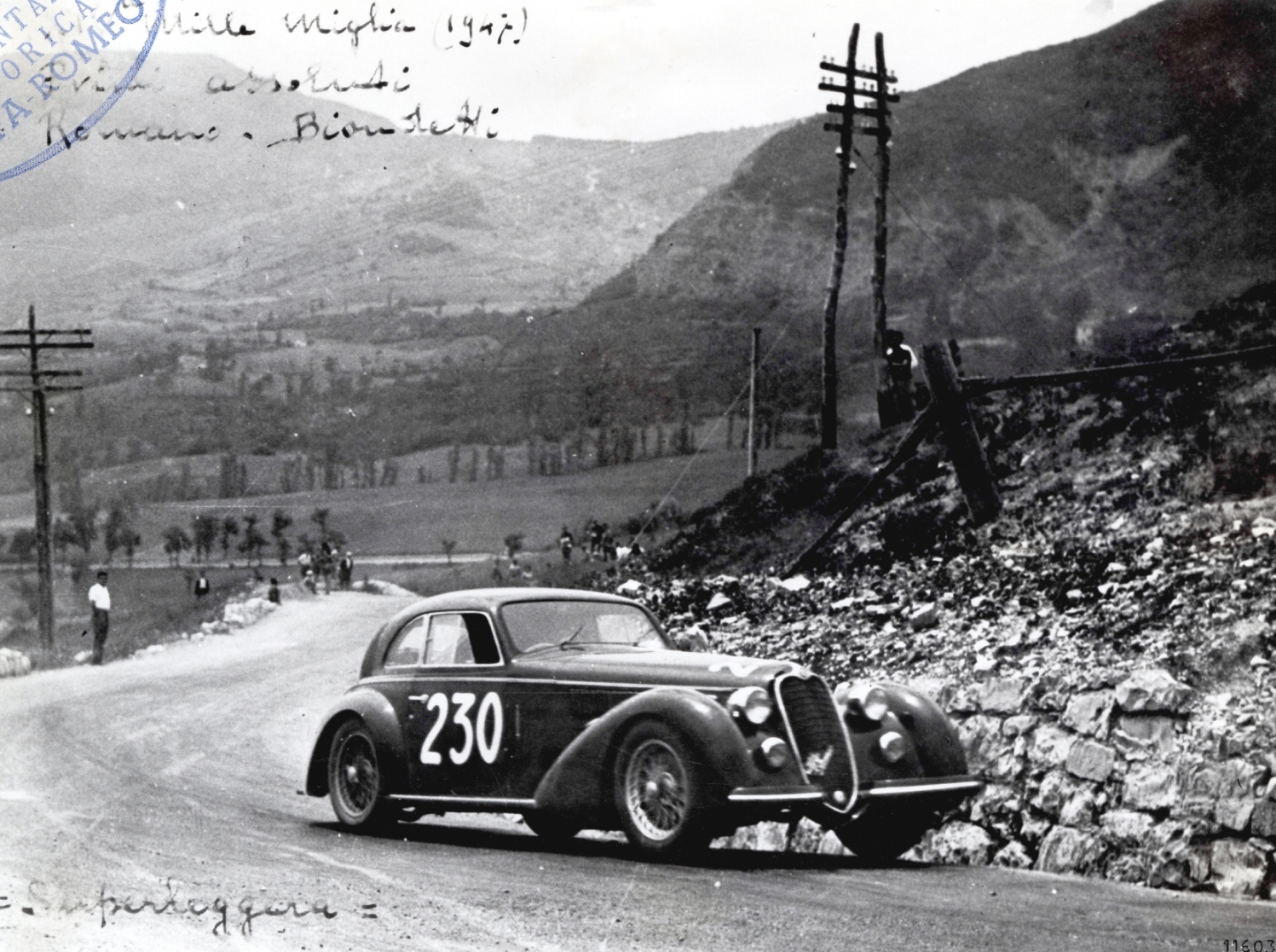
Biondetti wins 1947 Mille Miglia.

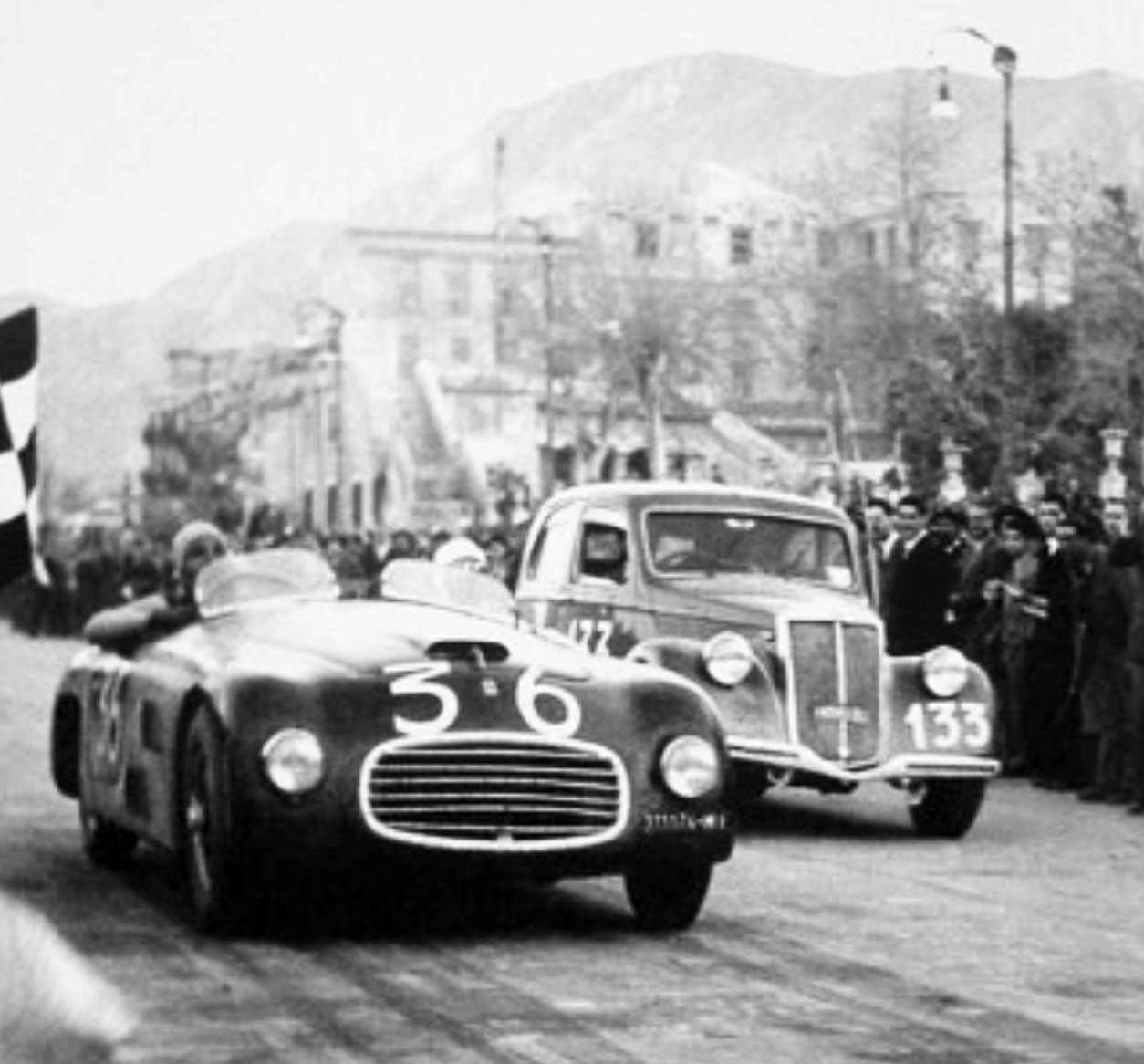
Biondetti and Troubetzkoy wins 1948 Targa Florio in Ferrari 166 S.

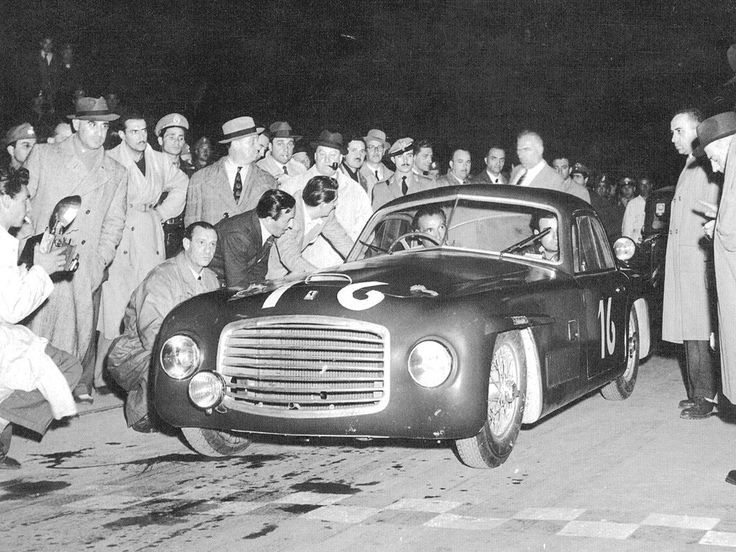
Biondetti and Navone wins 1948 Mille Miglia in Ferrari 166 S.

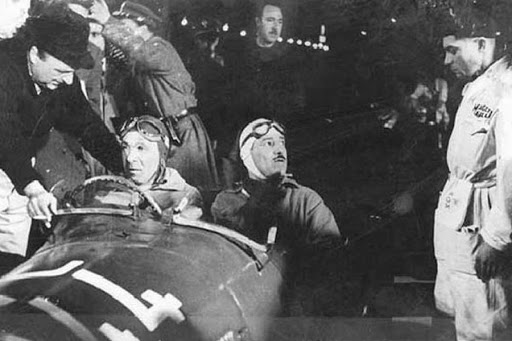
Biondetti and Benedetti wins 1949 Targa Florio in Ferrari 166 SC.

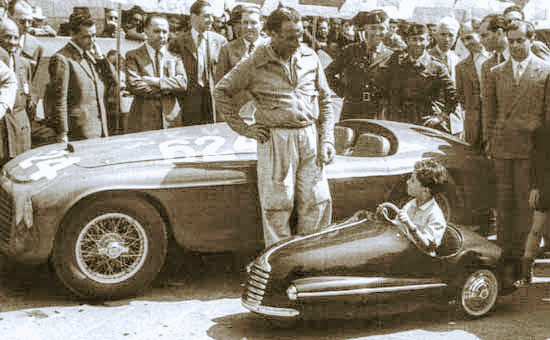
Biondetti wins 1949 Mille Miglia.

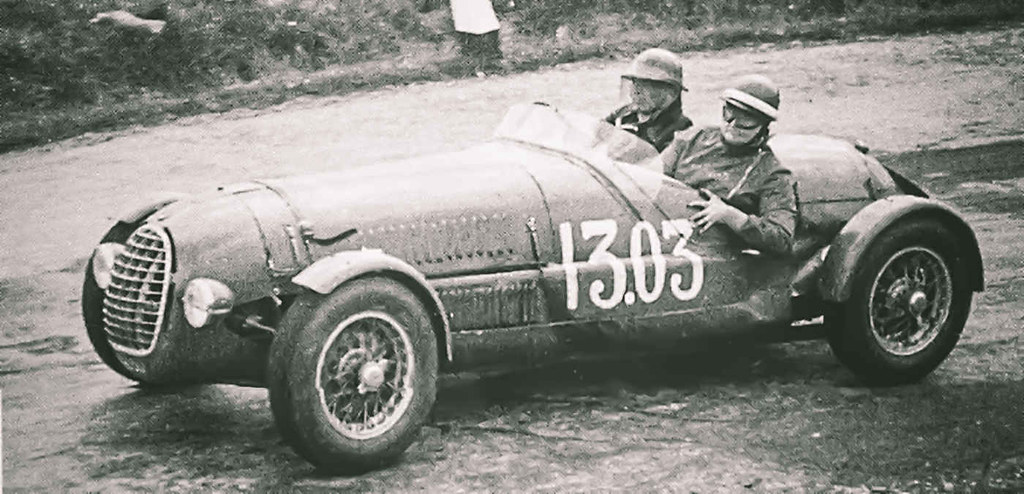
Biondetti Ferrari-Jaguar Special driven to a 4th place in 1951 Coppa della Toscana.

== Major victories ==
- Coppa Acerbo 1939
- Mille Miglia 1938, 1947, 1948, 1949
- Targa Florio 1948, 1949

== Racing record ==
=== Complete European Championship results ===
(key) (Races in bold indicate pole position; races in italics indicate fastest lap)

| Year | Entrant | Chassis | Engine | 1 | 2 | 3 | 4 | 5 | EDC | Pts |
|---|---|---|---|---|---|---|---|---|---|---|
| 1931 | Officine A. Maserati | Maserati 26M | Maserati 2.5 L8s | ITA | FRA; 3 | BEL | | | 12th | 19 |
| 1936 | Scuderia Maremmana | Maserati 6C-34 | Maserati 3.7 L6s | MON | GER | SUI; Ret | ITA; Ret | | 25th | 29 |
| 1937 | Scuderia Maremmana | Maserati 6C-34 | Maserati 3.7 L6s | BEL | GER | MON; Ret | SUI | | 15th | 34 |
| 1937 | Scuderia Ferrari | Alfa Romeo 12C-36 | Alfa Romeo 4.1 V12s | | | | | ITA; Ret | 15th | 34 |
| 1938 | Alfa Corse | Alfa Romeo Tipo 312 | Alfa Romeo 3.0 V12s | FRA | GER; Ret | SUI | | | 13th | 27 |
| 1938 | Alfa Corse | Alfa Romeo Tipo 316 | Alfa Romeo 3.0 V16s | | | | ITA; 4 | | 13th | 27 |
| 1939 | Alfa Corse | Alfa Romeo 158 | Alfa Romeo 1.5 L8s | BEL | FRA | GER | SUI; 9 | | 16th | 28 |

=== Post WWII Grandes Épreuves results ===
(key) (Races in bold indicate pole position; races in italics indicate fastest lap)

| Year | Entrant | Chassis | Engine | 1 | 2 | 3 | 4 | 5 |
|---|---|---|---|---|---|---|---|---|
| 1948 | Scuderia Inter | Ferrari 166 C | Ferrari 166 2.0 V12 | MON | SUI; Ret | FRA | ITA | |
| 1949 | Luigi Platé | Talbot 700 | Talbot 700 1.5 L8s | GBR | BEL | SUI; Ret | FRA | |
| 1949 | A. de Filippis | Maserati 4CLT/48 | Maserati 4CLT 1.5 L4s | | | | | ITA; Ret |

=== Complete Formula One World Championship results ===
(key) (Races in bold indicate pole position; races in italics indicate fastest lap)

| Year | Entrant | Chassis | Engine | 1 | 2 | 3 | 4 | 5 | 6 | 7 | WDC | Pts |
|---|---|---|---|---|---|---|---|---|---|---|---|---|
| 1950 | A. de Filippis | Maserati 4CLT/48 | Maserati 4CLT 1.5 L4s | GBR | MON; DNA | 500 | SUI | BEL | FRA | | NC | 0 |
| 1950 | Clemente Biondetti | Biondetti/Ferrari 166 SC | Jaguar XK 3.4 L6 | | | | | | | ITA; Ret | NC | 0 |

=== Complete 24 Hours of Le Mans results ===
| Year | Team | Co-Drivers | Car | Class | Laps | Pos. | Class Pos. |
|---|---|---|---|---|---|---|---|
| 1938 | (France) Raymond Sommer | (France) Raymond Sommer | Alfa Romeo 8C 2900B Touring | 5.0 | 219 | DNF | DNF |
| 1951 | (United Kingdom) Jaguar Cars Ltd | (United Kingdom) Leslie Johnson | Jaguar XK-120C | S 5.0 | 50 | DNF | DNF |
| 1953 | (Italy) Scuderia Lancia | (Argentina) José Froilán González | Lancia D20 | S 8.0 | 213 | DNF | DNF |

=== Complete Mille Miglia results ===
| Year | Team | Co-Drivers/Navigator | Car | Class | Pos. | Class Pos. |
|---|---|---|---|---|---|---|
| 1936 | | (Italy) Cerasa | Alfa Romeo P3 | +2.0c | 4th | 4th |
| 1937 | (Italy) Scuderia Ferrari | (Italy) Mazzetti | Alfa Romeo 8C 2900A | S+2.0 | DNF | |
| 1938 | (Italy) Alfa Corse | (Italy) Stefani | Alfa Romeo 8C 2900B Spider MM Touring | S3.0s | **1st** | |
| 1940 | | (Italy) Stefani | Alfa Romeo 6C 2500 SS Spider Touring | 3.0 | 4th | 2nd |
| 1947 | | (Italy) Romano | Alfa Romeo 8C 2900B Berlinetta Touring | S3.0 | **1st** | |
| 1948 | (Italy) Scuderia Ferrari | (Italy) Navone | Ferrari 166 S Coupé Allemano | S2.0 | **1st** | |
| 1949 | (Italy) Scuderia Ferrari | (Italy) Salani | Ferrari 166 MM Barchetta Touring | S2.0 | **1st** | |
| 1950 | (Italy) Clemente Biondetti | (Italy) Bronzoni | Jaguar XK120 | S+2.0 | 8th | 5th |
| 1951 | | (Italy) Cortini | Biondetti Ferrari-Jaguar Special | S/GT+2.0 | DNF | |
| 1952 | (Italy) Squadra Guastalla | (Italy) Ercoli | Ferrari 225 S Spyder Vignale | S+2.0 | DNF (Fire) | |
| 1953 | (Italy) Scuderia Lancia | (Italy) Barovero | Lancia D20 Pinin Farina | S+2.0 | 8th | 7th |
| 1954 | (Italy) Clemente Biondetti | | Ferrari 250 MM Pinin Farina | S+2.0 | 4th | 2nd |

=== Complete Targa Florio results ===
| Year | Team | Co-Drivers/Navigator | Car | Class | Pos. | Class Pos. |
|---|---|---|---|---|---|---|
| 1948 | (Italy) Scuderia Inter | (France) Troubetzkoy | Ferrari 166 S Spyder Allemano | S2.0 | **1st** | |
| 1949 | (Italy) Scuderia Inter | (Italy) Benedetti | Ferrari 166 SC | S+1.1 | **1st** | |
| 1950 | (Italy) Clemente Biondetti | (Italy) Bronzoni | Jaguar XK120 | S+2.0 | DNF (Engine) | |
| 1954 | | | Ferrari 250 MM | S+2.0 | 5th | 3rd |
