= Ferrari 166 S =

Ferrari 166 S Ferrari 166 MM
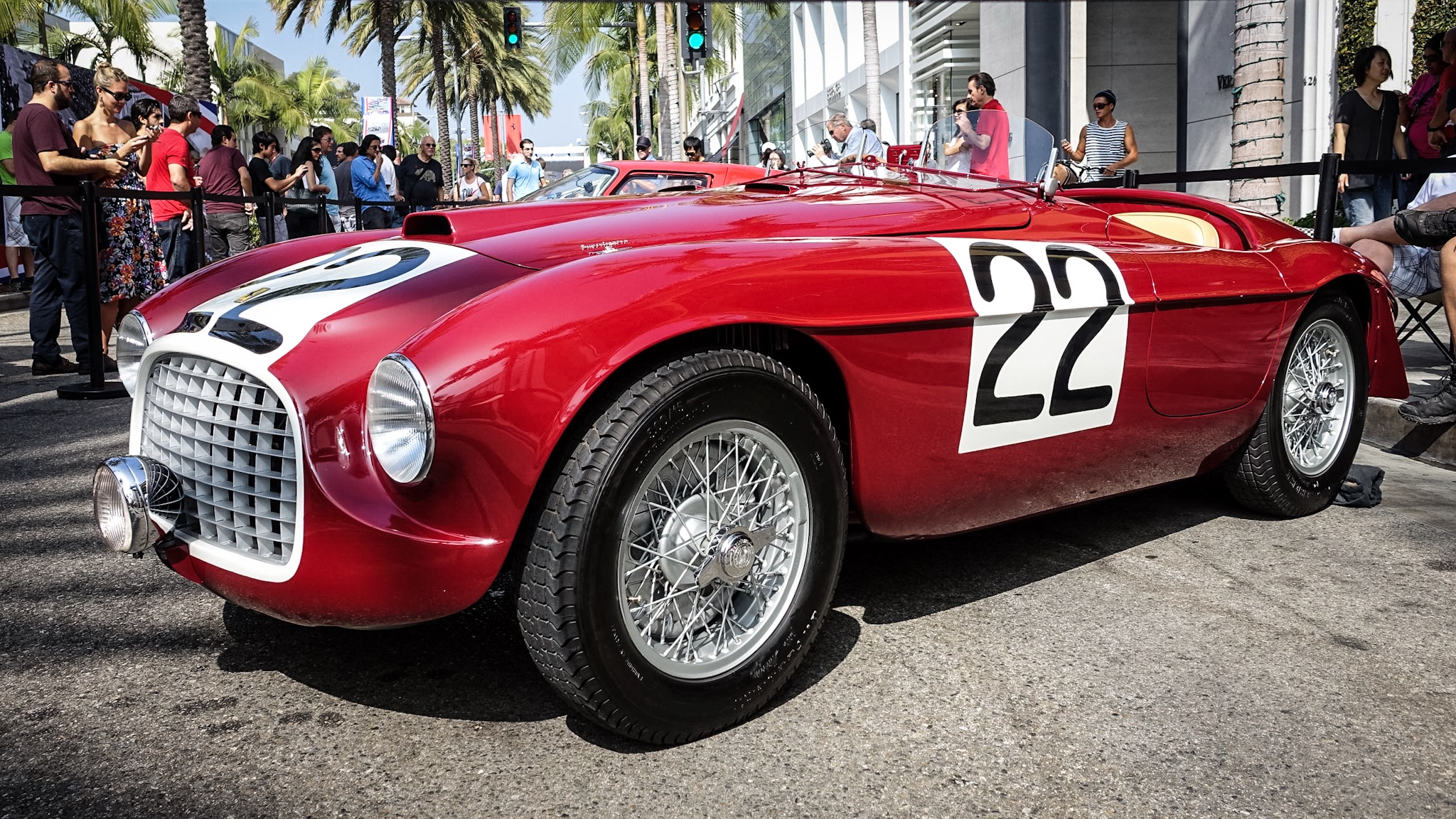
- 1949 Mille Miglia and Le Mans-winning Ferrari 166 MM

Overview
- Manufacturer: Ferrari
- Production: 1948–1953; 3 (Sport); 9 (Spyder Corsa); 47 (MM and MM/53)
- Designer: Federico Formenti at Touring; Allemano

Body and chassis
- Class: Sports car/Race car
- Body style: Berlinetta; Spider
- Layout: FR layout

Powertrain
- Engine: 2.0 L (1995.02 cc) Colombo V12
- Transmission: 5-speed manual

Dimensions
- Wheelbase: 2,420 mm (95 in); 2,200 mm (87 in) (MM)
- Curb weight: 800 kg (1,764 lb) (S, berlinetta); 650 kg (1,433 lb) (MM, spider)

Chronology
- Predecessor: Ferrari 159 S
- Successor: Ferrari 195 S

The Ferrari 166 S is a sports car built by Ferrari between 1948 and 1953, as a evolution of its Colombo V12-powered 125 S racer. It was adapted into a sports car for the street in the form of the 166 Inter.

Only 12 Ferrari 166 S were produced, nine of them with cycle-fenders as the Spyder Corsa. It was soon followed by the updated and highly successful Ferrari 166 MM (Mille Miglia), of which 47 were made from 1948 to 1953. Its early victories in the Targa Florio and Mille Miglia and others in international competition made the manufacturer a serious competitor in the racing industry. Both were later replaced by the 2.3 L 195 S.

== Design ==
The 166 shared its Aurelio Lampredi-designed tube frame and double wishbone/live axle suspension with the 125. Like the 125, the wheelbase was 2420 mm long. Nine 166 Spyder Corsas and three 166 Sports were built. The first two 166 S models were coachbuilt by Carrozzeria Allemano and the last one by Carlo Anderloni at Carrozzeria Touring. Majority of the 166 MM cars were bodied at Touring in a barchetta form.

The 1.5 L Gioacchino Colombo-designed V12 engine of the 125 was changed, however, with single overhead camshafts specified and a larger 2.0 L (1995 cc/121 in³) displacement. This was achieved with both a bore and stroke increase, to 60 by 58.8 mm respectively. Output was 110 PS (81 kW) at 5,600 rpm to 130 PS (96 kW) at 6,500 rpm with three carburetors, giving top speed of 170–215 km/h (106–134 mph). For the 166 MM power output rose to 140 PS (103 kW) at 6,600 rpm and top speed to 220 km/h (137 mph).

Motor Trend Classic named the 166 MM Barchetta as number six in their list of the ten "Greatest Ferraris of all time".

== Racing ==
The Ferrari 166 S won Targa Florio with Clemente Biondetti and Igor Troubetzkoy in 1948. In 1949, Biondetti also won in the 166 SC with Benedetti as co-driver. The 166 S won 1948 Mille Miglia, also driven by Biondetti, this time with Giuseppe Navone. In 1949 Mille Miglia, the Ferrari 166 MM Barchettas scored 1-2 victory with Biondetti/Salani and Bonetto/Carpani respectively. In 1949, the 166 MM also won the 24 Hours of Le Mans in the hands of Luigi Chinetti and Lord Selsdon, and so the 166 was the only car ever to win all three races. Another 166 won the 1949 Spa 24 Hours.

A 166 chassis, this time with the bigger 195 S engine, won the Mille Miglia again in 1950 with drivers Giannino Marzotto and Marco Crosara.

== Surviving examples ==
The oldest Ferrari car with an undisputed pedigree is s/n 002C, a 166 Spider Corsa which was originally a 159 and is currently owned and driven by James Glickenhaus. S/n 0052M, a 1950 166 MM Touring Barchetta was uncovered in a barn and was shown in public for the first time since 1959 in the August 2006 issue of Cavallino magazine. One 166 MM, 1949 s/n 0018M, was bodied by Zagato in 'Panoramica' style, very similar to their one-off Maserati A6 1500, also designed by Vieri Rapi. It is considered as first Ferrari coachbuilt by Zagato. A year later it was rebodied as Zagato Spyder. The original car was recreated in 2007 as part of Zagato's Sanction Lost programme.

== Gallery ==
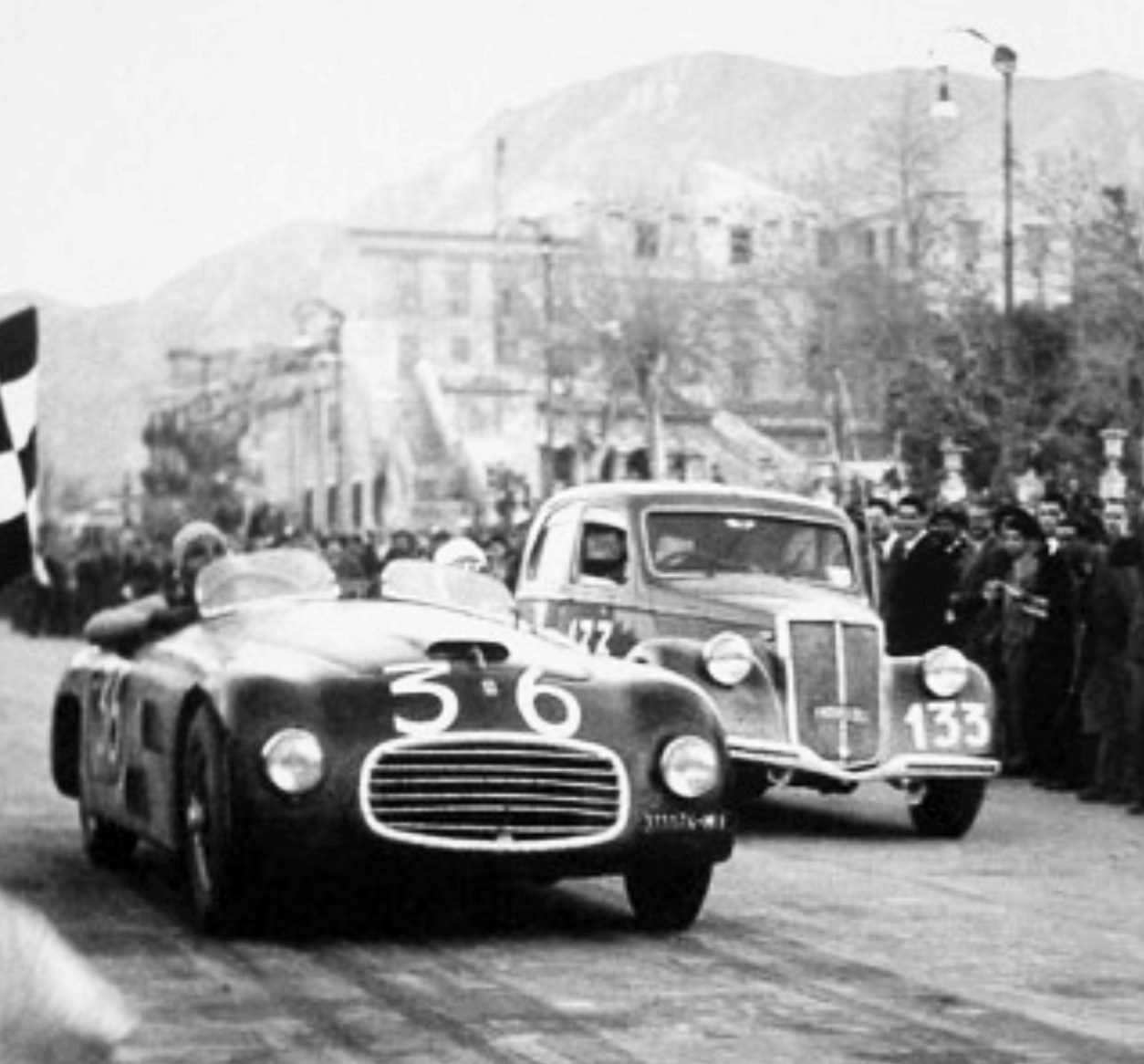
166 S (#001S) by Allemano winning its first race, Targa Florio (April 3, 1948), by Igor Troubetzkoy and Clemente Biondetti

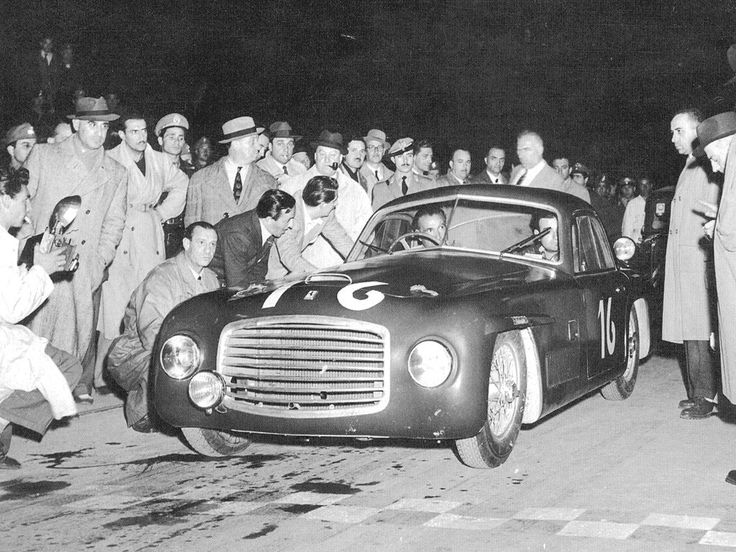
Ferrari 166 S (#003S) by Allemano winning its first race, Mille Miglia (May 2, 1948) by Biondetti and Giuseppe Navone

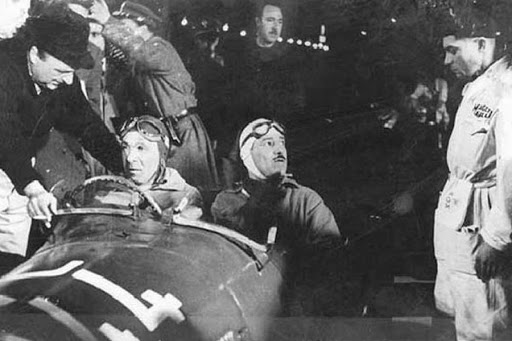
Biondetti at 1949 Targa Florio in a winning 166 Spyder Corsa (#006i)

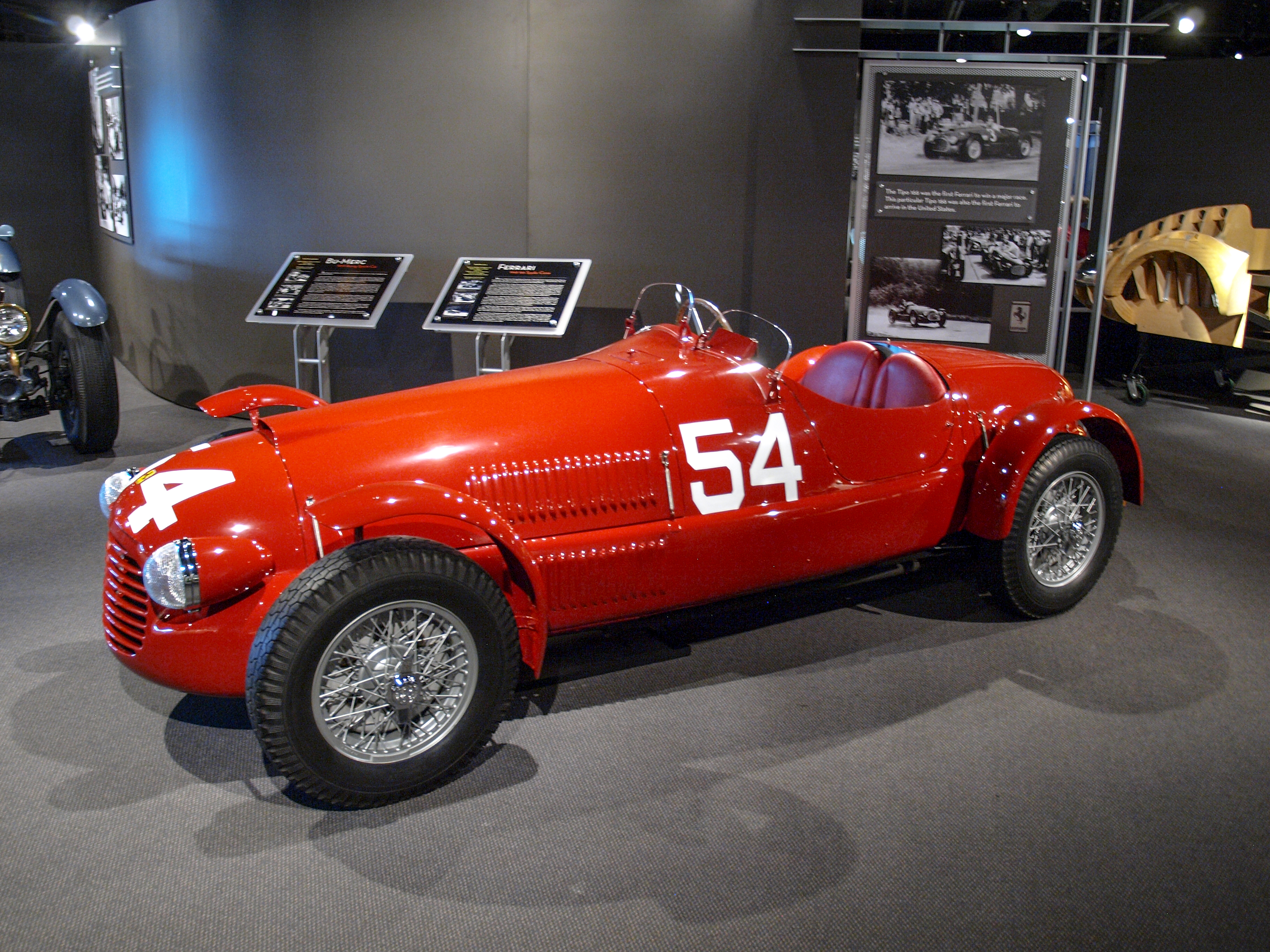
166 Spyder Corsa

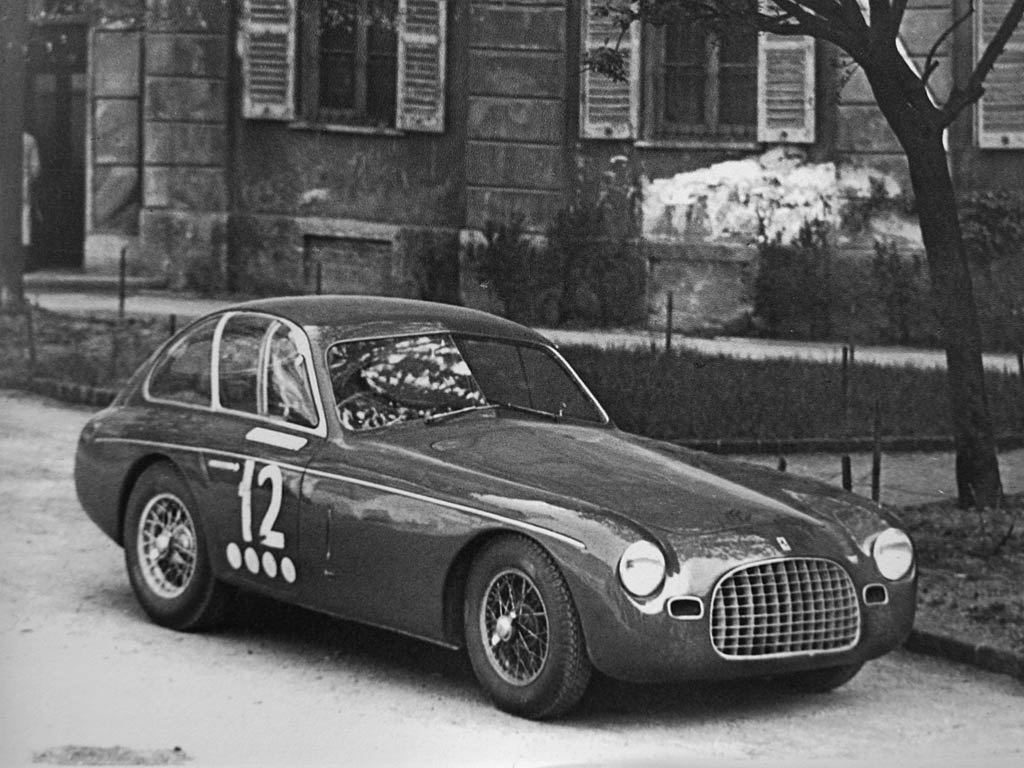
First Ferrari bodied by Zagato, 166 MM Panoramica

== See also ==
- 166 Inter
- Ferrari 166 MM Berlinetta Le Mans
- Ferrari-Abarth 166 MM/53
