= Circuito del Garda =

Racing venue in Italy

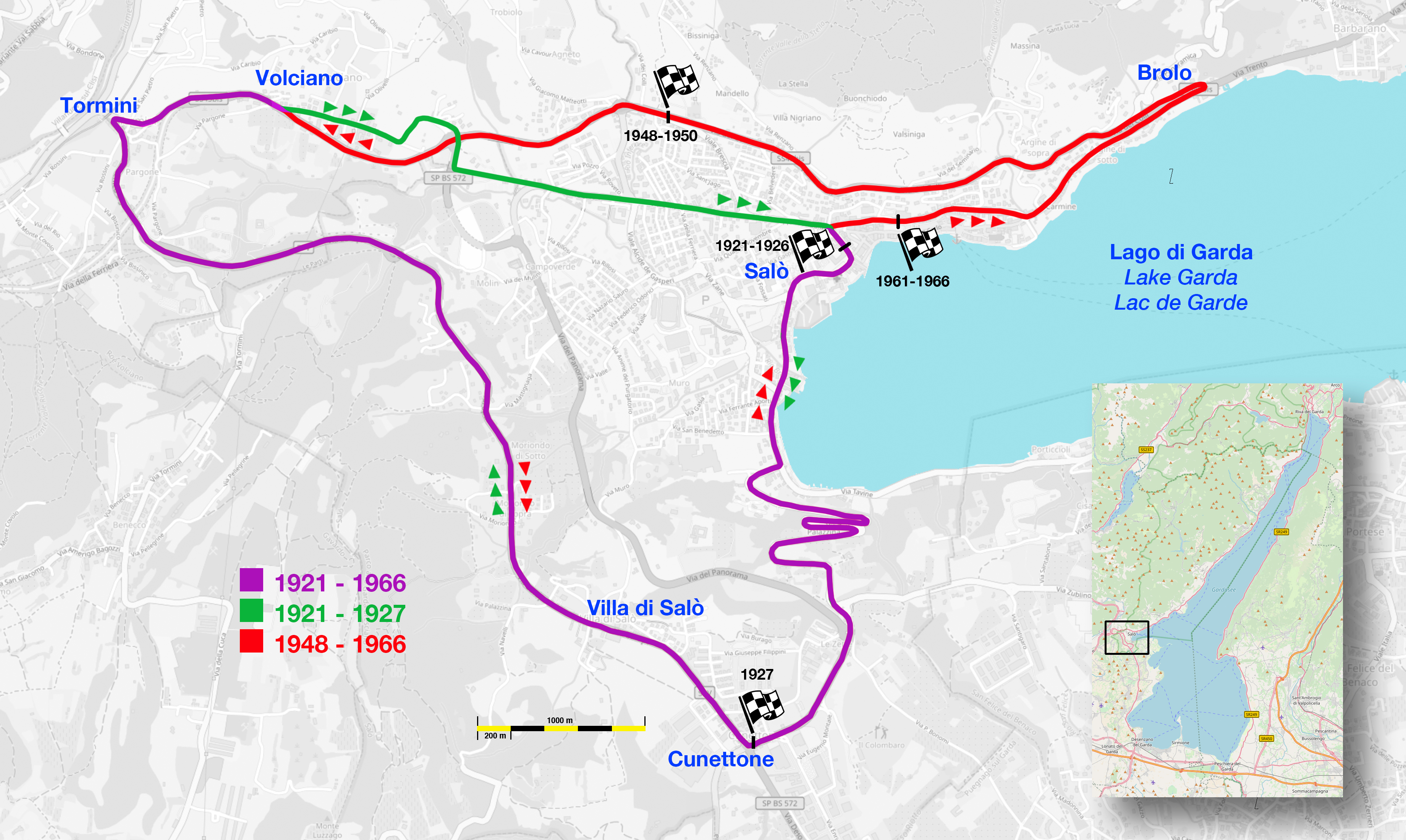
Circuito del Garda

Circuito del Garda is an Italian racing venue in Salò on the banks of Lake Garda, known for hosting fifteen Grand Prix races between 1921 and 1966.

These were arranged in three periods. Between 1921 and 1927 there were victories by Diatto drivers Eugenio Silvani (1921) and Guido Meregalli (1922–24), as well as Bugatti drivers Aymo Maggi (1925–26) and Tazio Nuvolari (1927 in a Bugatti 25). Next, in the period 1948–50 there were victories by Ferrari drivers Giuseppe Farina (1948), Luigi Villoresi and Alberto Ascari. The third period was the final, between 1961 and 1966.
