= Moncler =

Italian luxury fashion house specializing in outerwear

Moncler S.p.A.

- Moncler at P.C. Hooftstraat, Amsterdam
- Type: Società per azioni
- Traded as: BIT: MONC; FTSE MIB component
- Industry: Fashion
- Founded: 1952; 74 years ago in Monestier-de-Clermont, France
- Founder: René Ramillon, André Vincent
- Headquarters: Milan, Italy
- Key people: Remo Ruffini (Executive Chairman), Bartolomeo Rongone (Group CEO)
- Revenue: €3.13 billion (2025)
- Net income: €626.7 million (2025)
- Number of employees: 8,533 (2025)
- Subsidiaries: Stone Island
- Website: www.monclergroup.com, www.moncler.com

Moncler S.p.A. is an Italian luxury fashion brand specialized in ready-to-wear outerwear headquartered in Milan, Italy. Its core branding includes the cockerel, "M" monogram, felt appliqué badge, crossed skis and cartoon duck mascot.

Founded in the Alpine town of Monestier-de-Clermont, France, a ski resort near Grenoble, by René Ramillon, a French fashion designer, and André Vincent. Italian entrepreneur Remo Ruffini bought the company in 2003 and moved it to Milan, re-launching Moncler as a global purveyor of luxury goods.

Since 2013 Moncler has been listed on the Milan Stock Exchange. The house's collaborations with emerging designers and €1.15 billion-acquisition of Stone Island in 2020, has led to its increased presence in streetwear fashion.

== History ==
=== French origins: 1952–1992 ===
Founded in 1952 by René Ramillon and André Vincent, the name is an abbreviation of Monestier-de-Clermont, a village in the mountains near Grenoble, France.

In the beginning, Moncler produced padded sleeping bags, a single model of lined hooded cape, and tents with a telescopic structure and external covering. The first Moncler down jackets were made in 1954 for the company’s own workers, who wore them over their work overalls at the small mountain factory. The first to note them and realize their potential was French mountaineer Lionel Terray. The result saw the specialist range "Moncler pour Lionel Terray".

In 1954, Moncler quilted jackets were chosen to equip the Italian expedition to K2, which culminated with the conquest of the earth's second-highest summit by Achille Compagnoni and Lino Lacedelli. Moncler also accompanied the French expedition which reached the summit of Makalu in 1955 and was the official supplier for expeditions in Alaska organised by Lionel Terray in 1964. During the Grenoble Winter Olympics in 1968, Moncler became the official supplier of the French national downhill skiing team; on this occasion, the Moncler logo was changed, replacing the previous Monte Eguit symbol with a cartoon duck named MonDuck.

In 1972, the French national team adopted a new version of the down jacket: no longer the "double" model, but a single, more practical and lightweight garment tailored to the requirements of competitive sports. Initially named "Huascaran" and later "Nepal," the model featured leather shoulder reinforcements designed to carry skis without damaging the fabric. The concurrent rise of mass winter tourism had a positive impact on sales. During the 1980s, the down jacket—with its quilted construction and glossy finish, also available in bright colors—began to spread in urban areas and became an iconic garment associated with a specific italian youth subculture of the era. Fashion designer Chantal Thomass collaborated with the company until 1989, reinterpreting the aesthetic of the brand.

=== Italian development: since 1992 ===
In 1992, Moncler became an Italian brand through its acquisition by Pepper Industries, which later sold it to Finpart. In 2003, the brand was acquired by entrepreneur Remo Ruffini, who at the time also served as the company’s creative director. Under his leadership, Moncler underwent a profound transformation and was repositioned as a luxury brand.

In 2006, the Moncler Gamme Rouge line was launched. Initially designed by Alessandra Facchinetti until 2008, the line was subsequently led by Giambattista Valli until 2018. In 2007, the company shifted its distribution strategy by opening its first monobrand boutique in Paris, followed by stores in Milan (2008) and New York (2009).

In 2008, the Carlyle Group acquired a 48% stake in the company, while Ruffini retained 38%. In 2009, Moncler introduced Moncler Gamme Bleu, a menswear collection designed by Thom Browne until 2018. The following year, Moncler launched the Moncler Grenoble line in New York, a technical collection dedicated to skiing and après-ski wear.

Eurazeo, a French shareholder, invested in the Moncler group in 2011, in order to take 45% of the shares and 50% of the voting rights before selling the company for €1.4 billion in March 2019. Remo Ruffini remained the second-largest shareholder, with his stake reduced from 38% to 32%, while the Carlyle Group decreased its shareholding from 48% to 17.7%.

An IPO of Moncler on the Milan Stock Exchange took place on 16 December 2013, with an initial value of €10.20 per share. The shares were 27 times oversubscribed and rose 47% on the first day, resulting in a market capitalization of more than €4 billion.

In 2015, Ruffini regained his position as the largest shareholder of Moncler with a 32% stake, while Eurazeo reduced its holdings to 15.5%. A new shareholding structure was established in July 2016: two new partners — the Singapore sovereign wealth fund Temasek and Spanish businessman Julián Díaz González (known as Torres), chairman of Dufry — acquired a combined 24.4% stake in Ruffini Partecipazioni, the holding company that controls Moncler. Ruffini retained a 75.6% majority in the new entity, while Clubsette, the investment vehicle of Tamburi Investment Partners, exited the structure.

In February 2018 Moncler launched the Moncler Genius project, a new creative and business model where well-known designers create distinct collections interpreting Moncler's identity that are released on a monthly basis.

In March 2019, the U.S. investment fund BlackRock acquired a stake of 5.026% in Moncler's share capital. Ruffini remained the main shareholder with a 19.30% stake, followed by BlackRock, while the Eurazeo fund had fully exited its position. That same year, Moncler was included for the first time in the Dow Jones Sustainability Indices (DJSI) World and Europe.

=== Moncler Group ===
In December 2020, Moncler purchased Italian luxury sportswear brand Stone Island for €1.15 billion. In 2020, Moncler launched the "Born to Protect" sustainability plan which features renewable energy, animal welfare, recycling and charitable giving standards. In December 2021 Moncler became the official formalwear partner of Inter Milan.

In January 2026, Moncler announced the appointment of Bartolomeo Rongone as CEO and Remo Ruffini as Executive Chairman, effective April 1, 2026.

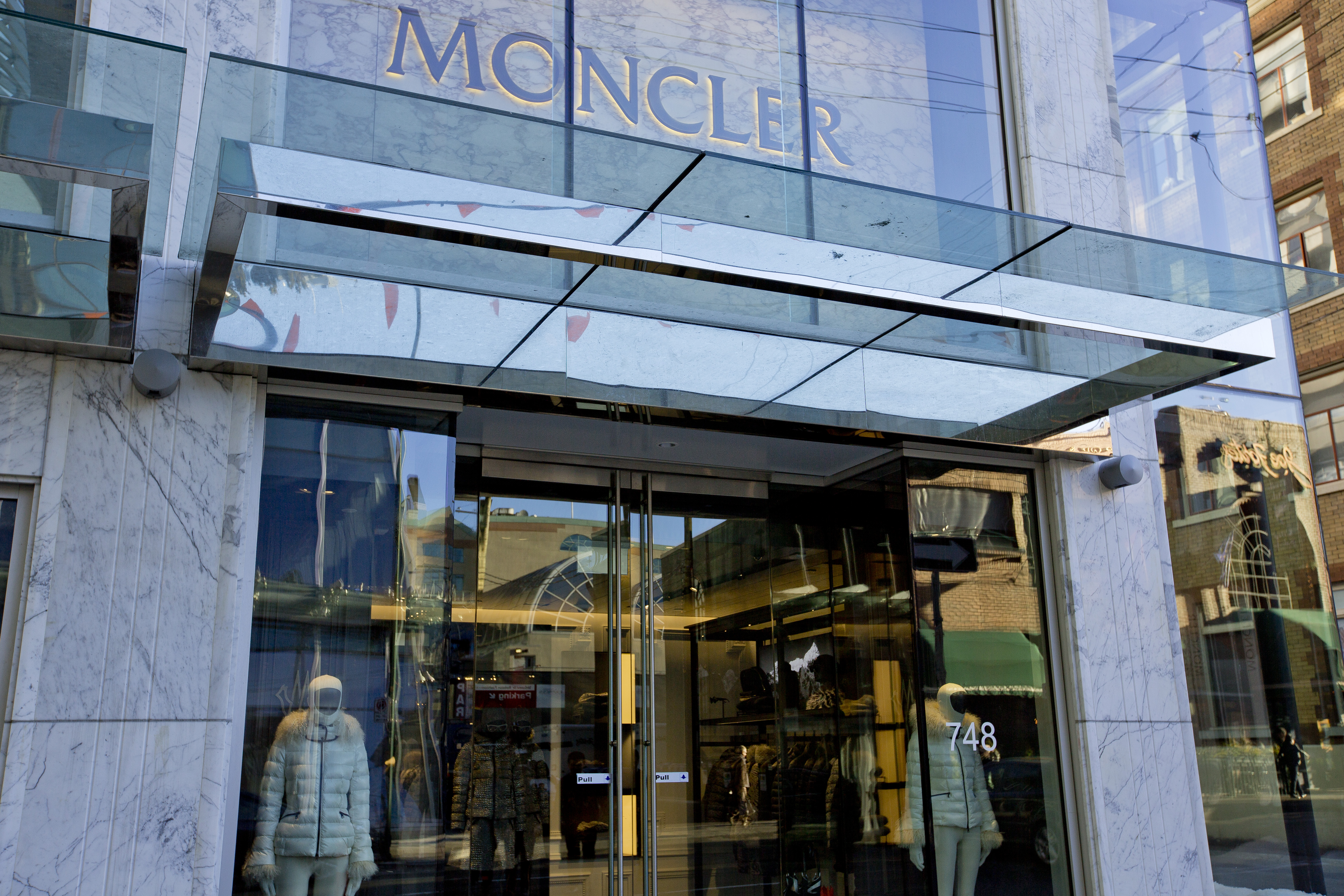
A Moncler boutique in Vancouver, Canada in January 2016.

== Collections ==
Moncler offers a wide range of down jackets to the public, generally positioned in the luxury segment, with a market expansion also into the summer season. The brand is present on the market with three collections:

- Moncler Collection: the main line, featuring outerwear and accessories for women, men, and children.
- Moncler Grenoble (since 2010): a technical collection offering both ski apparel and après-ski clothing with an urban approach.
- Moncler Genius (2018): a series of collections created by various designers, each interpreting Moncler’s identity.

== Collaborations ==
The following photographers have collaborated with Moncler for institutional campaigns:

- Bruce Weber (2009–2014),
- Annie Leibovitz (2014–2018)
- Steven Meisel (Gamme Rouge-related campaigns from 2009 to 2014)
- Liu Bolin (Spring-Summer 2017 and Fall-Winter 2017–2018)
- Craig McDean (Fall-Winter season 2018–2019)
- Tim Walker (2019)
- Poldo Dog Couture (2019)
- "Warmer Together" (2025) campaign featuring Robert De Niro and Al Pacino.

== Major shareholders ==
As of 24 April 2025

Shareholder	Stake (% of ordinary shares)
Double R S.r.l.	16.9%
Morgan Stanley	8.6%
Capital Research and Management Company	5.0%
BlackRock Inc.	5.0%
Venezio Investments Pte. Ltd.	4.5%
Treasury Shares	1.2%
Other Shareholders	58.8%

== Brand integrity ==
To deal with counterfeiting, the company instituted an online code verification system to authenticate purchased products.

== See also ==
- Fashion in Italy, France, and après-ski culture
- Stone Island, Arc'teryx, and Canada Goose
- Moët Hennessy Louis Vuitton (LVMH), Kering, and Richemont
