= Norwegian Wool =

Luxury outerwear company in New York

- Company type: Private
- Industry: Fashion
- Founded: 2014; 12 years ago
- Founder: Michael Berkowitz
- Headquarters: 554 5th Ave, 6th Floor, New York City, United States
- Owner: Michael Berkowitz

Norwegian Wool is a luxury outerwear company based in New York.

== History ==
Norwegian Wool was launched in 2014 by Michael Berkowitz as a men's outerwear brand. All of the coats are waterproof, and the winter coats are down-lined with a cashmere or wool exterior. In 2020, the brand expanded into women's outerwear. The main manufacturing facility is located in Tuscany, just outside of Florence, Italy. Norwegian Wool products are distributed in the US and Canada.

== Origins ==
Berkowitz left his job as a physical commodities trader to start the company after looking for a particular type of coat and not being able to find one that he wanted on the market. Starting as just a hobby, he soon quit his job at the hedge fund to sell coats full time. Corporate headquarters are located in Midtown Manhattan.
