= Norwegian Rain =

Norwegian outerwear brand

- Company type: Private company
- Industry: Fashion, outerwear
- Founded: 2008
- Founders: Alexander Torgnes Helle, Michael Tetteh Nartey (T-Michael)
- Headquarters: Bergen, Norway
- Products: Waterproof outerwear, raincoats
- Number of employees: 7 (2024)
- Website: norwegianrain.com

Norwegian Rain is a Norwegian outerwear brand founded by Alexander Torgnes Helle and Michael Tetteh Nartey (known as T-Michael). The brand began as a design project in 2007 and was incorporated in 2008 as Norwegian Rain AS. Headquartered in Bergen, Norway, the company specializes in design-led waterproof outerwear, particularly raincoats.

== History ==
Norwegian Rain was established in Bergen in 2007 as a collaborative design project between Alexander Torgnes Helle and Michael Tetteh Nartey (T-Michael). The company was formally incorporated in 2008 as Norwegian Rain AS.

The brand developed with a focus on combining technical waterproof performance with tailored design aesthetics. Bergen's climate and rainfall were cited as central inspirations for the company's product development.

== Products ==
Norwegian Rain produces waterproof outerwear, with an emphasis on raincoats that combine functional weather protection with structured tailoring. The company states that sustainability and fabric innovation are part of its design philosophy.

== Retail and distribution ==
The company operates through company-run retail formats, including flagship stores in Tokyo, Paris, Oslo and Bergen and smaller "compact" stores in Tokyo, Kyoto, New York, The Hague, Berlin and Kristiansand.

== Recognition ==
Norwegian Rain has received recognition within the Norwegian fashion and design industry. In 2024, the company was awarded the Oslo Runway Tribute Award.

In 2024, founders Alexander Torgnes Helle and Michael Tetteh Nartey were awarded the Jacob Prize (Jacob-prisen) by DOGA (Design and Architecture Norway) for their work in fashion and design.
