= Remo Ruffini (businessman) =

Italian businessman (born 1961)

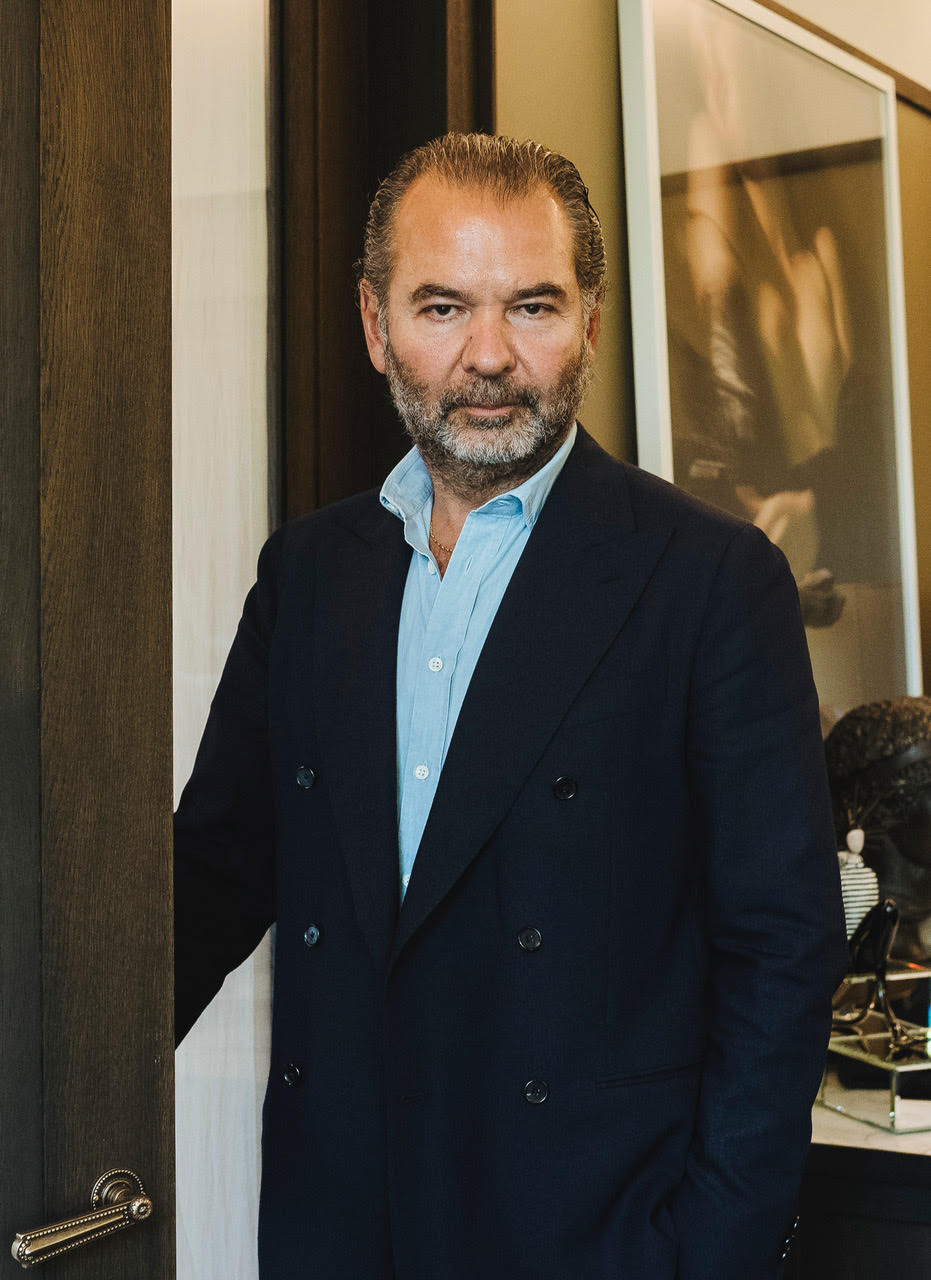
- Born: 27 August 1961 (age 64); Como, Italy
- Occupation: Business executive
- Known for: Executive Chairman and 15.8% owner of Moncler
- Spouse: Married
- Children: 2

Remo Ruffini (born 27 August 1961) is an Italian billionaire businessman, the chairman and CEO of the fashion company Moncler, and controls Double R Srl.

== Early life ==
Ruffini was born on 27 August 1961 in Como, Italy. He is the son of Gianfranco Ruffini who, in the 1970s, was owner of a clothing company in the US called Gianfranco Ruffini Ltd. His mother, Enrica, also owned a clothing company.

== Career ==
Ruffini started his career in the US, working for his father's eponymous company.

When he was 23, he returned to Italy and founded a company, New England, which he sold sixteen years later to Stefanel Group. That same year, he started working as a creative consultant for the holding company which owned Moncler.

In 2003, Ruffini took over Moncler, which was almost bankrupt at the time, and transformed the company by reinventing the brand.

In 2006 and 2009, respectively, Ruffini launched the new collections Moncler Gamme Rouge and Moncler Gamme Blue, which debuted on the runways of Paris and Milan. Both lines were discontinued to make way for the Moncler Genius project, introduced in 2018.

In 2010, Ruffini launched Moncler Grenoble in New York, a technical collection designed both for skiing and après-ski moments, reinterpreting past styles with a contemporary twist.

In December 2013, Ruffini took the company public by listing it on Milan's stock exchange. Within the first afternoon, the share price rose 47%. It was one of Italy's most successful IPOs at the time and he subsequently earned a place on the Forbes World's Billionaires list in 2014.

In 2018, Ruffini conceived the Moncler Genius project, where well-known designers create collections interpreting Moncler's identity that are released on a monthly basis.

Since 2018, Ruffini has served as a board member of Camera Nazionale della Moda Italiana.

In 2019, Moncler became a signatory of the Fashion Pact, an agreement among leading fashion and textile companies to reduce the environmental impact of their activities. Ruffini served as a member of its steering committee from 2019 to 2023.

On December 7, 2020, Moncler announced the acquisition of Stone Island for €1.15 billion, and Carlo Rivetti, the brand’s president, became a shareholder in Ruffini Partecipazioni, now known as Double R.

In July 2023, Remo Ruffini was awarded an honorary degree in "Arts in Fashion and Entrepreneurship" by the University for the Creative Arts in London.

In January 2026, Moncler announced that, effective April 1, 2026, Remo Ruffini would transition to the role of Executive Chairman, while Bartolomeo Rongone would take over as Chief Executive Officer.

== Personal life ==
Ruffini is married, with two sons, and lives in Como.

He owns a 180-ft yacht called "Atlante" and launched in 2015.

== Awards ==
Entrepreneur of the Year 2017 for Italy. In 2019, he won the Business Leader award at the British Fashion Awards and in 2024, he won the Trailblazer Award.

== Honours ==

Knight of Labour (Cavaliere del lavoro) - Order of Merit for Labour
