= Massimo Osti =

Italian fashion designer

- Born: 17 June 1944; Bologna, Italy
- Died: 6 June 2005 (aged 60); Bologna, Italy
- Labels: C.P. Company; Stone Island; ST-95; Left Hand

Massimo Osti (1944–2005) was an Italian garment engineer and fashion designer, most famous as the founder of the apparel brands Stone Island and C.P. Company. Osti's products were a mix of his own innovations and design ideas he got from studying military clothing, work-wear, and sportswear.

== Early years ==
Massimo Osti was born in Baricella, Bologna, on June 17, 1944, to Marino Osti and Gabriella Tonti. The youngest of three children, his father was killed by allied bombing of Bologna three months after his birth.

He became a graphic designer and worked in the advertising business. His career in the fashion industry began in the early 1970s, when he designed a T-shirt collection featuring placed prints. He was the first to use new techniques like the four-color process and silkscreen which are used for producing T-shirt. Following the success of this first T-shirt collection, he accepted the offer to design a complete Men's collection and became an equity partner in the company he would name 'Chester Perry' (later renamed the 'C.P. Company').

== 1980s ==
During this period, Osti laid the foundations for a creative philosophy entirely based on experimentation. The first innovation he would be responsible for in the clothing industry was garment dyeing, a process that completely revolutionized the field. It was based upon the concept of different materials in finished garments reacting differently to the same dye bath. Osti discovered that garment dyeing creates interesting tone-on-tone effects. This particular dyeing technique became typical for Osti's C.P. Company. In 1981, he launched "Boneville", a new brand alongside the existing C.P. Company and C.P. Company Baby collections.

Ongoing research on finishing techniques and materials led to yet another clothing line in 1982: Stone Island. The first collection was made entirely from a revolutionary new fabric that inspired from the tarps used by truck drivers. The 'used' look of this highly resistant, two-tone, reversible fabric was obtained through stone washing. This new collection was so successful that it sold out at every location within 10 days. In 1984, Osti relinquished 50% of his shares of C.P. Company to Carlo Rivetti, owner of GFT, but stayed on as president. He and his team devoted themselves to product development and communication strategies for the company. In 1985, he became the editor of C.P. Magazine, an extra-large format catalog/magazine that was sold at newspaper stands. It featured photographs of every garment in the C.P. Company collections and visualized the C.P. lifestyle perfectly. A circulation of 40,000 copies per collection proved that this unusual advertising tool was indeed effective. It started a trend that would later be followed by many other companies in the industry.

1987 was an important year in Osti's career. He invented and presented Rubber Flax and Rubber Wool – linen and wool with a thin, rubber coating. The rubber made the materials waterproof, improved their resistance and added a totally new look and feel to the garments. In the same year Osti experimented with brushed combed wool for the first time. Today all mills use this procedure for processing woolen textiles, the same process Osti invented in 1987.

The year also saw the birth of the color-changing Ice Jacket. In collaboration with ITS, Osti employed state-of-the-art technological research to create this new fabric which changed color by temperature variations. That same year, his constant commitment to experimentation earned Massimo Osti an invitation to represent the Italian clothing industry at an event commemorating the 750th anniversary of Berlin's founding, the 150th anniversary of textile manufacturing and his own 15th year in the business. For the occasion, an exhibit was held inside the Reichstag building in Berlin.

In 1988, Massimo Osti's designs developed a new means of communication with the public through the C.P. Company sponsorship of the Mille Miglia race. The company also showed its support of the Rainforest Foundation, the foundation spearheaded by Sting and Raoni, chief of the Kayapo tribe in Amazonia, whose purpose was to raise worldwide awareness of deforestation in the Amazon Rainforest.

== 1990s ==
1991 marked the opening of a C.P. Company store in New York's historical Flatiron Building, plus the launch of yet another iconic garment within the Stone Island line: the Reflective Jacket. This jacket was made from an innovative material, which was the fruit of technological research conducted in Japan. The material combined waterproof fabric with a very thin layer of glass microspheres, which reflected even the weakest light sources with astonishing effectiveness.

In 1993, a partnership with Allegri gave rise to Left Hand. This new brand was characterized by another exclusive material, a non-woven fabric made from pressed polyester and nylon fibers which, like felt, could be used with raw edge stitching. The Left Hand brand was revived in 2021 courtesy of Christopher Raeburn & Left Hand Studio. Also in 1993 Osti also relinquished the fully 100% of the shares of C.P. Company to his former partner Carlo Rivetti. The following year, Osti founded Massimo Osti Production, a company that would reap the benefits of the experience and successes accrued from 20 years' worth of formal and technical innovations. In 1995, the ST 95 line was launched and in 1996, Osti began a collaboration with Superga, which consisted in designing a collection of image-defining garments.

Just two years later in 1998, a new company was founded to produce and distribute the OM Project brand, the collaboration with the Frattini Group. This new line of clothing would also be characterized by the use of innovative fabrics:

- Electric-j – a highly resistant material made of polyester and copper fibers
- Cool Cotton – whose natural look is derived from its cotton component while its other component
- Cool max – a hollow fiber that absorbs bodily moisture and wicks it outwards
- Mag Defender – a canvas made of polyester and carbon fibers whose highly resistant weave shields its wearer from magnetic fields
- Steel – an "urban armor" featuring a nylon canvas which is woven with twisted cotton and stainless steel, making it highly resistant to cuts and tears.

In 1999, Massimo Osti began the collaboration with Dockers Europe to design a new line of technical pants called Equipment for Legs. Of the technical materials used in this collection, a special blend of Kevlar stood out in particular; its increased softness and functionality made it appropriate to its application in garment production.

== 2000–present ==
Among Osti's last projects was the ICD line. Created in 2000 thanks to a collaboration with Levi's, it offered a vast array of high performance technical outerwear. This collection was then supplemented by the ICD+ line which, thanks to an agreement with Philips, featured outwear garments which came equipped with a cell phone, mp3 player, and accompanying headphones and microphone which were all wired to the garment itself. It was the world's first commercial example of wearable technology.

Massimo Osti died in 2005 and his legacy lives on today through the Massimo Osti Archive, a textile archive which includes 5,000 garments and over 50,000 fabric samples from approximately 300 textile mills and garment finishing companies from around the world.

== Product innovations ==
=== Four-process printing on fabric (1970) ===
A Bologna-based company commissioned Massimo Osti to design printed T-shirts, something he had never done before. At the age of 25, Osti was in close contact with the social and artistic movements of the time and profoundly aware of the changes taking place in society. At the time of his first forays into the world of fashion, Osti's background in advertising led him to use his graphics know-how as a starting point for tackling his first challenges. "For these T-shirts I used processes for printing on paper to get the finished result, techniques like silkscreen, placed prints, four-process printing, photocopy, etc. It was the first time anything like that was done in Italy. I remember that I had to silkscreen the first T-shirts myself before convincing the technician to do them"

=== Garment dyeing (1979) ===
"I discovered that two different materials absorbed and reacted differently to the dye when dyed simultaneously, thereby creating interesting 'tone-on-tone' effects." This is the basis of garment dyeing, a process that revolutionized the entire industry at the time, both because of the unusual look it produced and because of the significant decrease in costs it represented.

Main characteristics: each garment is dyed, instead of the materials they were made of. Interesting 'tone-on-tone' effects, and simplification of dyeing process.

=== Brushed wool (1987) ===
Osti took this special process, which was originally used on cotton, and experimented with it on wool until he refined the procedure through research and adapted it specifically to this noble fiber, revolutionizing the industry.

=== Rubber flax and rubber wool (1987) ===
These materials, created by Osti, became very popular in the textile industry. They took noble and traditional fabrics like linen and wool and granted them a new look and texture, allowing them to drape and fall differently. The special rubber coating not only enhanced their natural characteristics but also granted increased functionality, such as resistance to water and allows them to remain adaptable to patterns.

Main characteristics: classic materials looked renewed and responded in a new way to wear; also they became more weatherproof.

=== Ice jacket (1987) ===
A jacket made of a revolutionary material that changes color with temperature variations due to its special chemical composition. The "Ice Jacket" is also highly waterproof and windproof. Made of innovative Japanese fabric, later Italian textile research lab was commissioned to work on thermosensitive fabric, next season garments made of darker, not-that-bright colors were produced. Later Ice camo was developed.

Main characteristics: jacket changes color by temperature variation, e.g., yellow-green, White to blue. Waxy smooth coating.

Key-item: First ICE Jacket 1987

=== Micro (1992) ===
This fabric was first presented in the LEFT HAND collection and is made of pressed microfiber and nylon fibers. The pressing is a traditional technique, originally used to make paper. This process grants the fabric an unmistakable "deerskin" hand and excellent breath ability.

Main characteristics: natural deerskin look, but warmer feel.

=== Thermojoint (1993) ===
This material was also used in the LEFT HAND collection. Its main characteristics are total resistance to water and wear and up to 80% protection from nuclear radiation.

=== Technowool (1995) ===
Used for the first time in the F/W 1996 collection by "Massimo Osti Production," this combination of wool and nylon jersey is wear-resistant and preserves the breathability, naturalness and durability of wool.

== Collections ==
- Chester Perry (1971–77)
- C.P. Baby (1978–93)
- C.P. Company (1978–94)
- Boneville (1981–93)
- Stone Island (1982–95)
- C.P. Collection (1987–91)
- Left Hand (1993–99)
- Valdemarca (1994–95)
- Production (1995–98)
- St 95 (1996–98)
- Superga (1997–98)
- Equip. For Legs (1999–2000)
- Om Project (1999)
- Icd/Icd+ (2000)
- Mo Double Use (2003–05)
- Alterego (2004–05)
- Ma.strum (2008 Archive inspired)
