= Mille Miglia =

Italian endurance road race

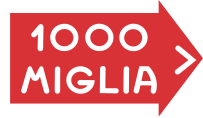
- Venue: Italy (Brescia–Rome–Brescia)
- First race: 26–27 March 1927
- Last race: 11–12 May 1957
- Distance: 1,000 miles (approximately)
- Laps: One
- Most wins (driver): (Italy) Clemente Biondetti
- Most wins (manufacturer): (Italy) Alfa Romeo

The Mille Miglia (Italian pronunciation: [ˈmille ˈmiʎʎa], Thousand Miles) was an open-road, motorsport endurance race established in 1927 by the young Counts Francesco Mazzotti and Aymo Maggi. It took place in Italy 24 times from 1927 to 1957 (13 times before World War II, and 11 times from 1947).

Like the older Targa Florio and later the Carrera Panamericana in Mexico, the MM made grand tourers like Alfa Romeo, BMW, Ferrari, Maserati, Mercedes-Benz, and Porsche famous. The race brought out an estimated 5 million spectators.

From 1953 until 1957, the Mille Miglia was also a round of the World Sports Car Championship.

In 1977, the "Mille Miglia" was reborn as a regularity race for classic and vintage cars. Participation is limited to cars, produced no later than 1957, which had attended (or were registered to) the original race. The route (Brescia–Rome round trip) is similar to that of the original race, maintaining the point of departure/arrival in Viale Venezia in Brescia.

== Car numbering ==
Unlike modern day rallying, where cars are released with larger professional-class cars going before slower cars, in the Mille Miglia the smaller, slower, lower displacement cars started first. This made organisation simpler, as marshals did not have to be on duty for as long of a period, and it minimised the period that roads had to be closed. From 1949, cars were assigned numbers according to their start time. For example, the 1955 Moss/Jenkinson car, #722, left Brescia at 07:22 (see below), while the first cars had started at 21:00 the previous day. In the early days of the race, even winners needed 16 hours or more, so most competitors had to start before midnight and arrive after dusk, if at all.

== History ==
=== Before World War II ===
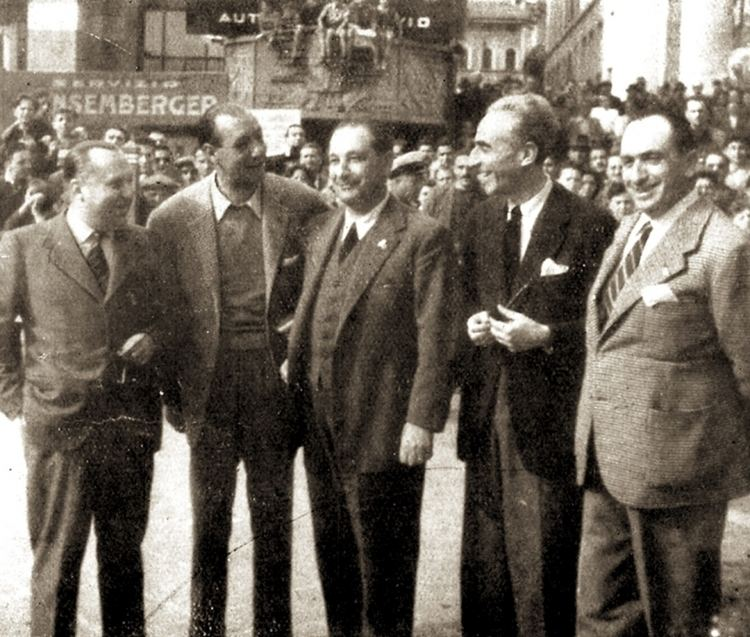
Some of the founders posing together in Brescia, here pictured in the 1940s. From left to right: Giulio Binda, Aymo Maggi, Filippo Tassara, Giovanni Canestrini and Renzo Castagneto.

The Mille Miglia race was established by the young Counts Aymo Maggi and Franco Mazzotti, sports manager Renzo Castagneto, and motoring journalist Giovanni Canestrini, apparently in response to the Italian Grand Prix being moved from their home town of Brescia to Monza. Together with a group of wealthy associates, they chose a race from Brescia to Rome and back, a figure-eight shaped course of roughly 1,500 km—or a thousand Roman miles. Later races followed twelve other routes of varying total lengths.

The first race started on 26 March 1927, with seventy-seven (77) starters—all Italian—of which fifty-one (51) reached the finishing post at Brescia by the end of the race. The first Mille Miglia covered 1,618 km, corresponding to just over 1,005 American or British miles. Entry was strictly restricted to unmodified production cars, and the entrance fee was set at a nominal 1 lira. The winner, Giuseppe Morandi, completed the course in just under 21 hours 5 minutes, averaging nearly 78 km/h (48 mph) in his 2-litre OM-produced car; Brescia-based Officine Meccaniche (OM) swept the top three places.

Tazio Nuvolari won the 1930 Mille Miglia in an Alfa Romeo 6C. Having started after his teammate and rival Achille Varzi, Nuvolari was leading the race, but was still behind Varzi, the holder of provisional second position, on the road. In the dim half-light of early dawn, Nuvolari tailed Varzi with his headlights off, thereby not being visible in the latter's rear-view mirrors. He then overtook Varzi on the straight roads approaching the finish at Brescia, pulling alongside and flicking his headlights on.

The event was usually dominated by local Italian drivers and marques, but three races were won by foreign cars. The first one was in 1931, when German driver Rudolf Caracciola, famous in Grand Prix racing, and riding mechanic Wilhelm Sebastian won with their big supercharged Mercedes-Benz SSKL, averaging for the first time more than 100 km/h (63 mph) in a Mille Miglia. Caracciola had received little support from the factory due to the economic crisis at that time. He did not have enough mechanics to man all necessary service points. After performing a pit stop, they had to hurry across Italy, cutting the triangle-shaped course short in order to arrive in time before the race car.

The race was briefly stopped by Italian leader Benito Mussolini after an accident in 1938 killed a number of spectators. This race saw eleven spectator fatalities; a Lancia Aprilla being driven by Angelo Mignanego and Dr. Luigi Bruzzo, just before they entered Bologna, went off the road and crashed into a whole group of spectators lining the road to watch the race. Ten people were killed, seven of whom were children, and 26 were injured; both competitors survived. Later in the race, another accident in Ferrara injured six people, and another took the life of a twelve-year-old girl just outside Rovigo. These accidents caused such an uproar in Italian society that the decision making of the race’s future went to the top of the Italian fascist government: Mussolini himself. The race was not run in 1939, instead "Litoranea Libica 1939" from Tobruk to Tripoli took place in Libya (then an Italian colony), which was won by Mussolini's personal chauffeur Ercole Boratto. When Mille Miglia resumed in April 1940, shortly before Italy entered World War II, it was dubbed the "Grand Prix of Brescia", and held on a 100 km (62 mi) short triangular course in the plains of northern Italy between Brescia, Cremona and Mantova that was lapped nine times.

This event saw the debut of the first Enzo Ferrari-owned marque AAC (Auto Avio Costruzioni) with the Tipo 815. Despite being populated mainly by Italian car makers, it was the aerodynamically-improved BMW 328, driven by Germans Huschke von Hanstein/Walter Bäumer, that won the high-speed race with an all-time high average of 166 km/h (103 mph), even though the 1940 event was run on a much shorter and localised 100 km (62.5 mi) circuit.

=== After World War II ===
After the war, with the tragic accidents of 1938 having largely been forgotten due to the horrors of war, three of the organizers (minus Franco Mazzotti, who had been killed in the war) tried to revive the race, ultimately succeeding in receiving permission to run it in 1947. Despite post-war rationing, Italian government gave them enough gasoline to run the race, and Pirelli also offered four free tires for every registered car, resulting in an explosion of registrations. However, many entrants only registered to take advantage of the opportunity to receive a full tank of gas and new tires.

The participants of the first post-war run were once again all Italians, as British and French teams and drivers were unable to make the trip to Italy due to post-war currency shortages and in the United States, sports car racing had yet to become popular. German teams were also excluded for political reasons. Even in the 1948 race, Donald Healey and his son Geoffrey, who finished ninth in a Healey Westland roadster, were still the only non-Italian participants.

The Italians continued to dominate their race after the war, now again on a single big lap through Italy. Mercedes made another good effort in 1952 with the underpowered Mercedes-Benz 300 SL Gullwing, scoring second, with the German crew Karl Kling/Hans Klenk that later in the year would win the Carrera Panamericana. Caracciola, in a comeback attempt, was fourth.

Few other non-Italians managed podium finishes in the 1950s, among them Juan Manuel Fangio, Peter Collins, and Wolfgang von Trips.

==== Stirling Moss at the Mille Miglia ====
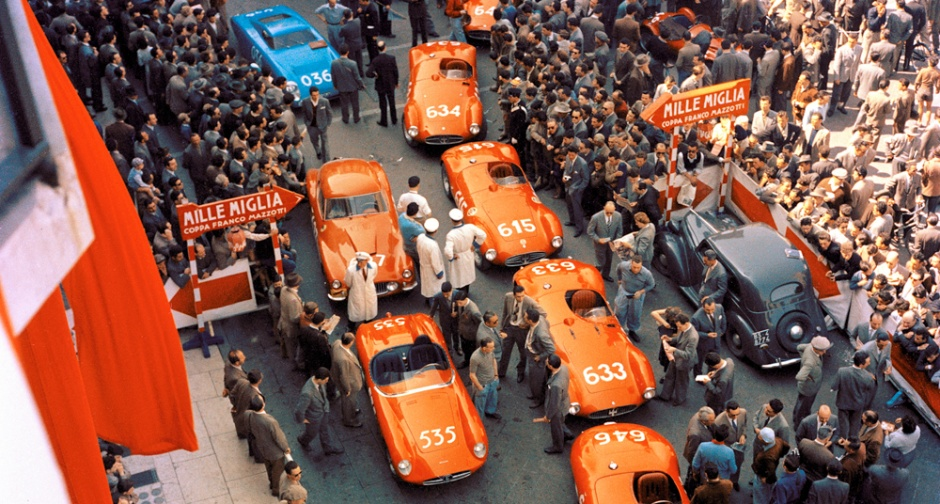
Cars in Brescia before departure at 1955 Mille Miglia.

In 1955, Mercedes made another attempt at winning the Mille Miglia; this time, with careful preparation and a more powerful car, the Mercedes-Benz 300 SLR, which was based on the Formula One car (Mercedes-Benz W196), entirely different from their sports cars carrying the 300 SL name.

Both young German Hans Herrmann, who had remarkable previous efforts with Porsche, and Briton Stirling Moss relied on the support of navigators. Meanwhile, Juan Manuel Fangio (car #658) preferred to drive alone as usual, as he considered open road races dangerous after his co-pilot and friend was killed during a race across South America. Karl Kling also drove alone, in the fourth Mercedes, #701.

Similar to his teammates, Moss and his navigator, motor race journalist Denis Jenkinson, ran a total of six reconnaissance laps beforehand, enabling "Jenks" to make course notes (pace notes) on a scroll of paper 18 ft (540 cm) long, which he read from and gave directions to Moss during the race by a coded system of 15 hand signals. Although this undoubtedly helped them, Moss's innate ability and the 300 SLR's exceptional build quality were clearly the predominant factors. Moss was competing against drivers with a large amount of local knowledge of the route, so the reconnaissance laps were considered an equaliser, rather than an advantage.

Car #704 with Hans Herrmann and Hermann Eger was said to be fastest in the early stages. Herrmann had already had a remarkable race in 1954, when the gate on a railway level crossing was lowered in the last moment before the fast train to Rome passed. Driving a very low Porsche 550 Spyder, Herrmann decided it was too late for a brake attempt; knocked on the back of the helmet of his navigator Herbert Linge to make him duck; and they barely passed below the gates and before the train, to the surprise of the spectators. Herrmann was less lucky in 1955, having to abandon the race after a brake failure on the Futa Pass between Florence and Bologna, while Kling crashed just outside Rome.

After 10 hours, 7 minutes and 48 seconds, Moss/Jenkinson arrived in Brescia in their Mercedes-Benz 300 SLR with the now-famous #722, setting the event record at an average of 157.650 km/h (97.96 mph), which was fastest ever on this 1,597 km (992 mi) variant of the course, not to be beaten in the remaining two years. Fangio arrived a few minutes later in the #658 car, but having started 24 minutes earlier, it actually took him about 30 minutes longer, having engine problems at Pescara, through Rome. By the time Fangio reached Florence, a fuel injection pipe had broken, and he was running on seven cylinders. This race was unusual in that it did not rain at any part of the route; it almost always rained at least once somewhere along all the routes used throughout the race’s history. The extended good weather helped Moss and Jenkinson to set their all-time record.

=== The end ===
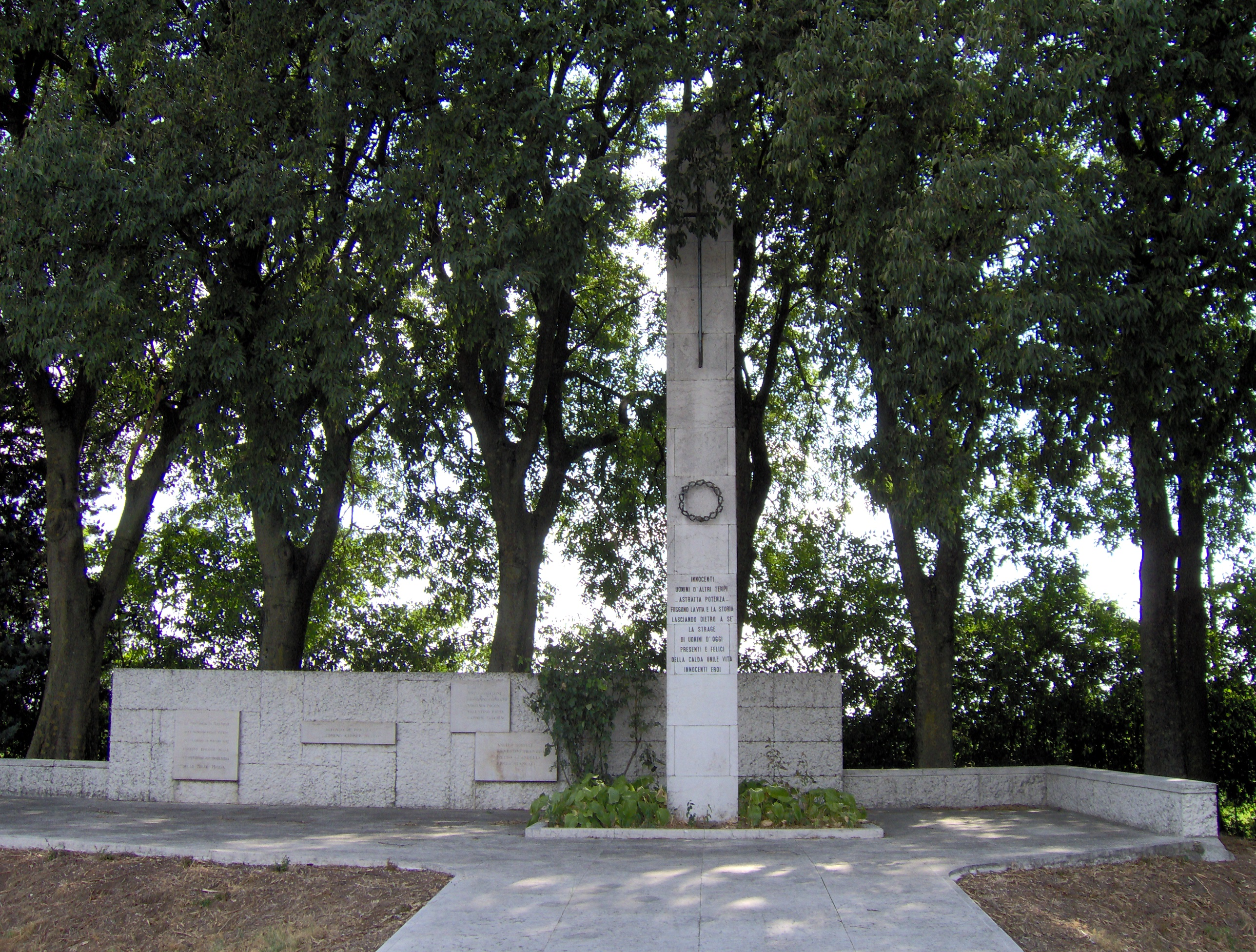
Memorial in Guidizzolo for the nine victims of the fatal crash during the 1957 Mille Miglia.

The race was known for its danger, not only to drivers, but also to spectators. Over its 30-year history, a total of 56 people died. The deaths involved 24 drivers/co-drivers and 32 spectators. Most of these fatal accidents occurred on the fastest parts of the route, and almost always involved spectator fatalities. The most notorious part was the very fast first 200 miles of the circuit between Brescia and Ravenna, where more than half the fatalities during the 1950s happened. With the exception of 1927, 1931–1934 and 1936–1937, there was at least one fatal accident every year, and of the 56 total known fatalities during this race, 35 of them occurred between 1948 and 1957—an average of nearly four per race.

Racing the Mille Miglia ended after two fatal crashes involving multiple people occurred during the 1957 race. The first crash involved the factory-entered 4.0-litre Ferrari 335 S. Eleven people were killed at the village of Guidizzolo: Spanish driver Alfonso de Portago, American co-driver/navigator Edmund Nelson, and nine spectators. Five of the spectators killed were children who were standing along the race course. Portago was called in as a last-minute replacement, and was already unsettled by a race he felt was too dangerous. The crash was caused by a worn tire striking the sharp edge of a cat's eye in the road. The second crash took the life of Dutch driver Joseph Göttgens at Florence, driving a Triumph TR3 in heavy rain.

From 1958 to 1961, the Mille Miglia resumed as a rally-like event, limited to legal speeds with a few special stages that were driven at racing speed. After 1961, this once-prestigious race was permanently discontinued.

=== Circuit variants ===
The original route from 1927 to 1930 was run anti-clockwise, and headed down to Rome via Piadena, Parma, Modena, Bologna, Florence, Siena and Viterbo, then it headed north up a mountainous route through Perugia and Gubbio, then would join the Adriatic sea route at Porto Recanati, then through Pesaro, Rimini, Forli, Bologna, Ferrara, Padova, and Treviso. This variant used to use a route via the Dolomite town of Feltre; then headed south towards Vicenza, Verona; and then finally, towards Brescia. The first part of the circuit was changed in 1931, bypassing the Piadena route and going directly south towards Cremona, and then going east and rejoining the existing route at Parma. This route was used until 1933.

The next route, used from 1934 to 1936, saw Feltre and the Dolomites section bypassed, and a route that ran near Venice was added, but the rest of the route was the same. From 1937 to 1938, the route was substantially modified. Although the top half remained more or less the same, the bottom half was rerouted at Florence to run west towards Lucca and Pisa, and then ran along the Tyrrhenian West Coast down through Livorno, Grosseto and Vetralla before reaching Rome. The circuit then went up and cut through the mountainous range, bypassing Perugia right up to Pesaro, and joining the existing route. This was the last of the pre-WWII Mille Miglia circuits that ran through Bologna twice. The 1940 event was called the "Grand Prix of Brescia", and was run on a very fast 100 km (62 mi) course in northern Italy, that went from Brescia, went west at the village of Le Grazie, and then went north from Cremona back to Brescia.

In 1947, the race was run clockwise for the first time, and the circuit route was modified. This was the longest of all the Mille Miglia routes, at 1,132 mi (1,822 km). Treviso and Venice were bypassed, and the route from the 1937 variant remained the same; but from Piacenza, the route went further west towards Alessandra, and then went north and east from Turin to Novara, Milan, Bergamo, and finally ending at Brescia.

In 1949, the race was reverted to being run anti-clockwise, and was also rerouted. This was perhaps the fastest variant of the Mille Miglia circuit route- Bologna, Modena, Florence, and the Futa and Raticosa Passes were all bypassed as this variant ran largely along the Italian coasts; also bypassed was the whole northwestern section, which included Turin and Milan, with a new route going through Cremona, and rejoining at Piacenza, and shortened the route down to its intended length at 1,000 mi (1,600 km). At Parma, the circuit ran south through another route through the Apennine mountains towards La Spezia and Massa, before rejoining the 1947 variant at Pisa. The circuit was then rerouted to go through the mountain towns of Rieti and L'Aquila, and then went further east towards Pescara, where it went along the Adriatic coast before rejoining the 1947 circuit at Pesaro. The circuit then cut past Forli, and went through Ravenna, before rejoining the previous route at Ferrara.

The 1950 variant saw the race being switched back to being run clockwise permanently. The circuit remained largely the same up until Pisa; the route that went east to Florence that was first introduced in 1937 was re-introduced, and then part of the original route up through the Futa and Raticosa Passes to Bologna, then going west towards Modena and Piacenza was also re-introduced.

For the 1951 event, the direct route between Ravenna and Rimini was bypassed, and the circuit was diverted from Ravenna to Forli, and back to Rimini again. However, more significantly, the Tyhrennian coast section first introduced in 1937 was eliminated, and part of the original route that ran from Rome to Florence via Viterbo and Siena was re-introduced. The route was not changed until 1954, when a new section was introduced to pay tribute to Tazio Nuvolari, which diverted from Cremona and ran through his hometown of Mantua, which was the final iteration of the circuit used for the original race.

== Winners ==
Year	Drivers	Car	Picture of winners & cars
1927	(Italy) Ferdinando Minoia (Italy) Giuseppe Morandi	OM 665 S	
1928	(Italy) Giuseppe Campari (Italy) Giulio Ramponi	Alfa Romeo 6C 1500 Super Sport Spider Zagato	
1929	(Italy) Giuseppe Campari (Italy) Giulio Ramponi	Alfa Romeo 6C 1750 Super Sport Spider Zagato	
1930	(Italy) Tazio Nuvolari (Italy) Battista Guidotti	Alfa Romeo 6C 1750 Gran Sport Spider Zagato	
1931	(Germany) Rudolf Caracciola (Germany) Wilhelm Sebastian	Mercedes-Benz SSKL	
1932	(Italy) Baconin Borzacchini (Italy) Amedeo Bignami	Alfa Romeo 8C 2300 Spider Touring	
1933	(Italy) Tazio Nuvolari (Italy) Decimo Compagnoni	Alfa Romeo 8C 2300 Spider Zagato	
1934	(Italy) Achille Varzi (Italy) Amedeo Bignami	Alfa Romeo 8C 2600 Monza Spider Brianza	
1935	(Italy) Carlo Maria Pintacuda (Italy) Alessandro Della Stufa	Alfa Romeo Tipo B	
1936	(Italy) Antonio Brivio (Italy) Carlo Ongaro	Alfa Romeo 8C 2900 A	
1937	(Italy) Carlo Maria Pintacuda (Italy) Paride Mambelli	Alfa Romeo 8C 2900 A	
1938	(Italy) Clemente Biondetti (Italy) Aldo Stefani	Alfa Romeo 8C 2900 B Spider MM Touring	
1939	No race held		
1940	(Germany) Huschke von Hanstein (Germany) Walter Bäumer	BMW 328 Berlinetta Touring	
1941–46	No races held		
1947	(Italy) Clemente Biondetti (Italy) Emilio Romano	Alfa Romeo 8C 2900 B Berlinetta Touring	
1948	(Italy) Clemente Biondetti (Italy) Giuseppe Navone	Ferrari 166 S Coupé Allemano	
1949	(Italy) Clemente Biondetti (Italy) Ettore Salani	Ferrari 166 MM Barchetta Touring	
1950	(Italy) Giannino Marzotto (Italy) Marco Crosara	Ferrari 195 S Berlinetta Touring	
1951	(Italy) Luigi Villoresi (Italy) Pasquale Cassani	Ferrari 340 America Berlinetta Vignale	
1952	(Italy) Giovanni Bracco (Italy) Alfonso Rolfo	Ferrari 250 S Berlinetta Vignale	
1953	(Italy) Giannino Marzotto (Italy) Marco Crosara	Ferrari 340 MM Spyder Vignale	
1954	(Italy) Alberto Ascari	Lancia D24 Spider	
1955	(United Kingdom) Stirling Moss (United Kingdom) Denis Jenkinson	Mercedes-Benz 300 SLR	
1956	(Italy) Eugenio Castellotti	Ferrari 290 MM Spyder Scaglietti	
1957	(Italy) Piero Taruffi	Ferrari 315 S	

== Mille Miglia Storica ==
Mille Miglia Storica
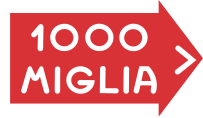
- Venue: Italy (Brescia–Rome–Brescia)
- First race: 17–19 June 1977
- Last race: 9–13 June 2026
- Distance: 1,000 miles (approximately)
- Laps: One
- Most wins (driver): (Italy) Giuliano Canè (10)
- Most wins (team): (Italy) Giuliano Canè / Lucia Galliani (9)
- Most wins (manufacturer): (Italy) Alfa Romeo (13)

Since 1977, the race was revived as the Mille Miglia Storica, a parade for pre-1957 cars that takes several days, which also spawned the 2007 documentary film Mille Miglia – The Spirit of a Legend.

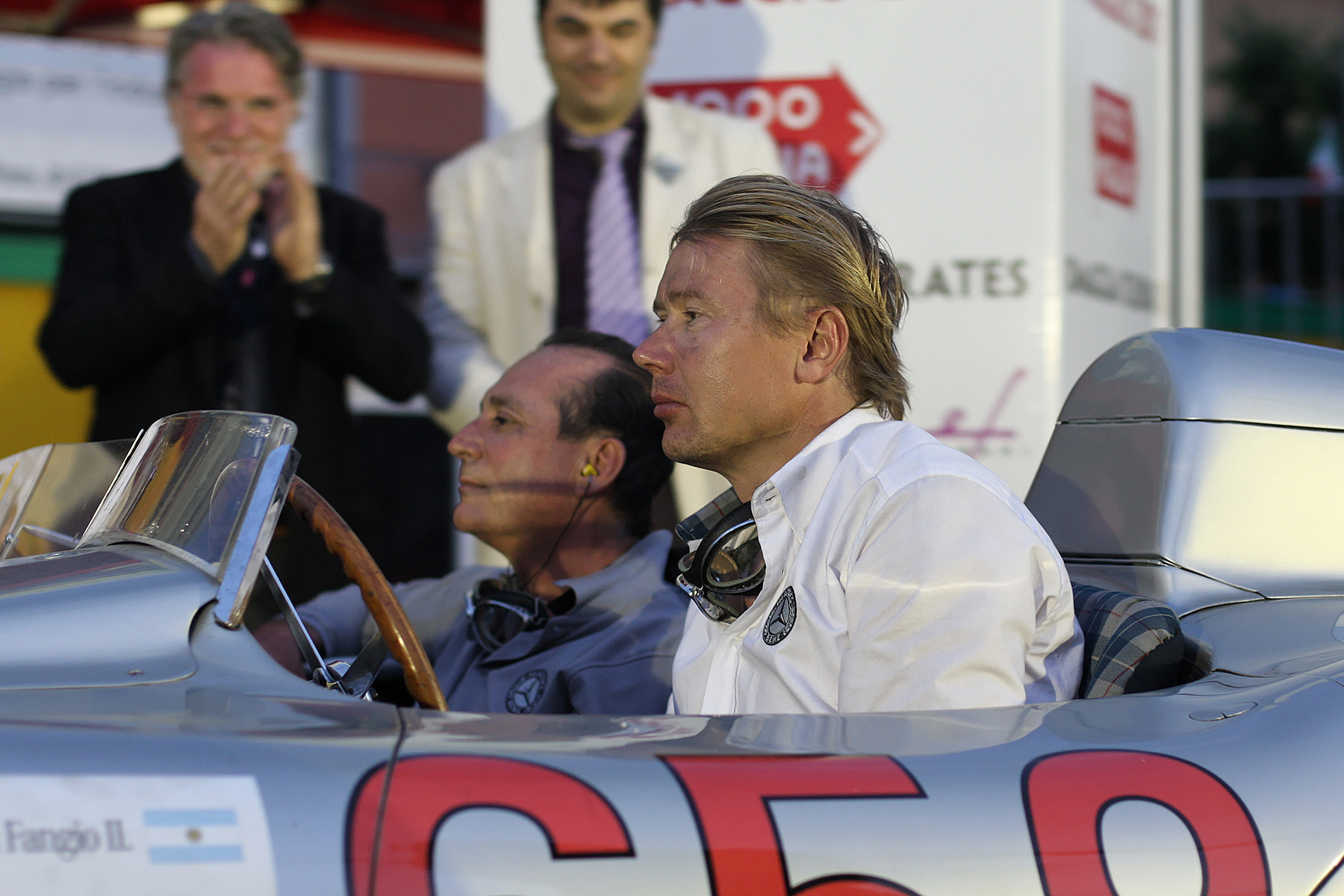
Mika Häkkinen and Juan Manuel Fangio II at 2011 Mille Miglia

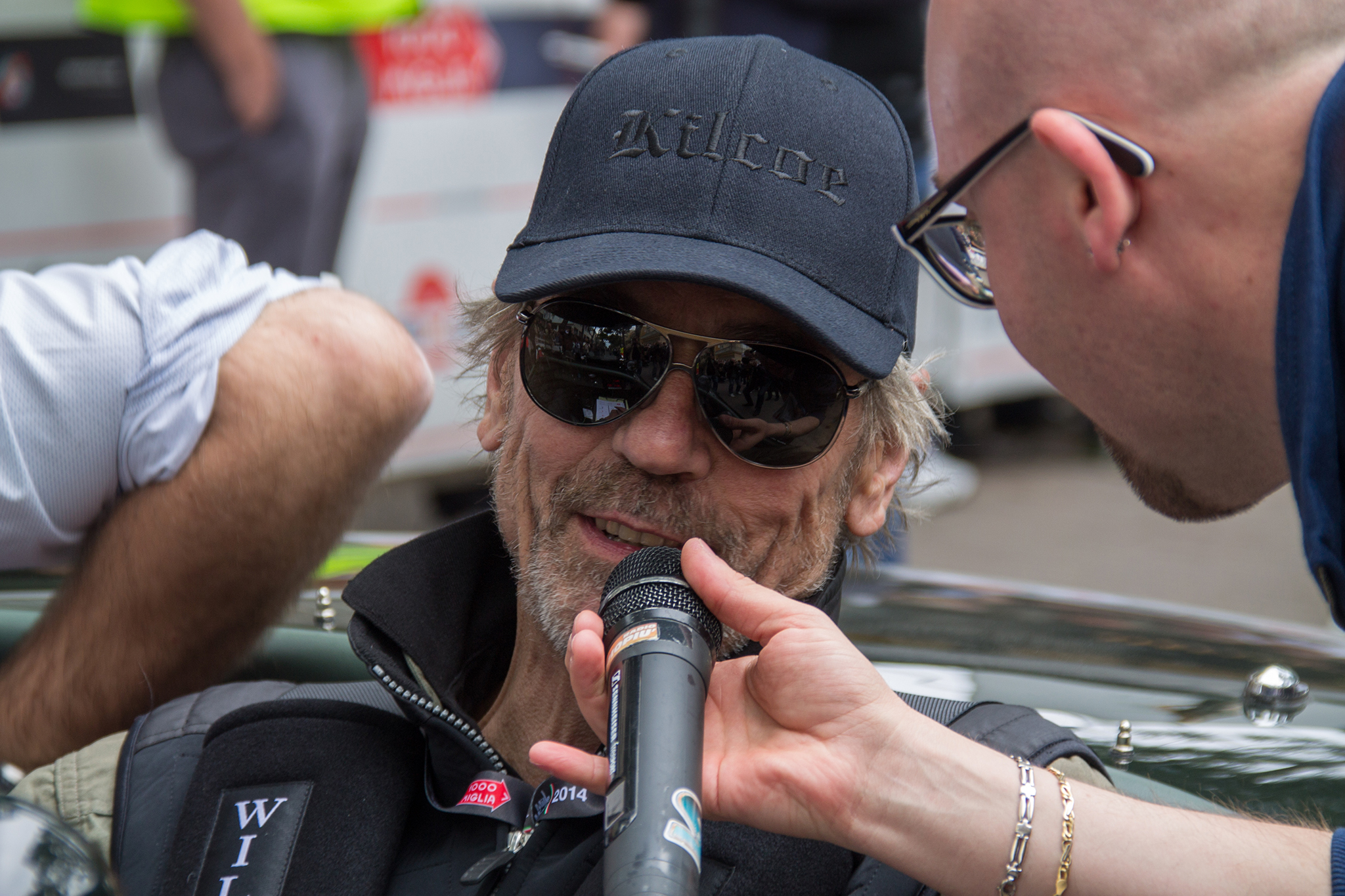
Jeremy Irons at 2014 Mille Miglia

=== Mille Miglia Storica winners ===
Year	Driver	Co-driver	Car	Manufacturer
1977	(Germany) Hepp	(Germany) Bauer	Alfa Romeo RL Super Sport – 1927	(Italy) Alfa Romeo
1982	(Italy) Bacchi	(Italy) Montanari	O.S.C.A MT 4 – 1956	(Italy) O.S.C.A
1984	(Italy) Palazzani	(Italy) Campana	Stanguellini 1100 S – 1947	(Italy) Stanguellini
1986	(Germany) Schildbach	(Germany) Netzer	Mercedes-Benz SSK – 1929	(Germany) Mercedes-Benz
1987	(Italy) Nannini	(Italy) Marin	Maserati 200 SI – 1957	(Italy) Maserati
1988	(Italy) Rollino	(Italy) Gaslini	Fiat 1100 S MM – 1948	(Italy) Fiat
1989	(Italy) Valseriati	(Italy) Favero	Mercedes-Benz 300 SL – 1955	(Germany) Mercedes-Benz
1990	(Italy) Agnelli	(Italy) Cavallari	Cisitalia 202 SC – 1950	(Italy) Cisitalia
1991	(Italy) Panizza	(Italy) Pisanelli	Renault 750 Sport – 1954	(France) Renault
1992	(Italy) Giuliano Canè	(Italy) Lucia Galliani	BMW 507 – 1957	(Germany) BMW
1993	(Italy) Vesco	(Italy) Bocelli	Cisitalia 202 SC – 1948	(Italy) Cisitalia
1994	(Italy) Giuliano Canè	(Italy) Lucia Galliani	Lancia Aurelia B 20 – 1957	(Italy) Lancia
1995	(Italy) Ferrari	(Italy) Salza	Abarth 750 Zagato – 1957	(Italy) Fiat
1996	(Italy) Giuliano Canè	(Italy) Lucia Galliani	BMW 328 MM – 1937	(Germany) BMW
1997	(Italy) Valseriati	(Italy) Sabbadini	Mercedes-Benz 300 SL – 1952	(Germany) Mercedes-Benz
1998	(Italy) Giuliano Canè	(Italy) Lucia Galliani	BMW 328 MM – 1937	(Germany) BMW
1999	(Italy) Giuliano Canè	(Italy) Auteri	Ferrari 340 MM – 1953	(Italy) Ferrari
2000	(Italy) Giuliano Canè	(Italy) Lucia Galliani	BMW 328 MM – 1937	(Germany) BMW
2001	(Italy) Sisti	(Italy) Bernini	Healey Silverstone – 1950	(United Kingdom) Healey
2002	(Italy) Giuliano Canè	(Italy) Lucia Galliani	BMW 328 Touring – 1940	(Germany) BMW
2003	(Argentina) Sielecki	(Argentina) Hervas	Bugatti T 23 Brescia – 1923	(France) Bugatti
2004	(Italy) Giuliano Canè	(Italy) Lucia Galliani	BMW 328 MM Coupé – 1939	(Germany) BMW
2005	(Italy) Viaro	(Italy) De Marco	Alfa Romeo 6C 1500 S – 1928	(Italy) Alfa Romeo
2006	(Italy) Giuliano Canè	(Italy) Lucia Galliani	BMW 328 MM Coupé – 1939	(Germany) BMW
2007	(Italy) Viaro	(Italy) Bergamaschi	Alfa Romeo 6C 1500 Super Sport – 1928	(Italy) Alfa Romeo
2008	(Italy) Luciano Viaro	(Italy) Antonio Viaro	Alfa Romeo 6C 1500 Super Sport – 1928	(Italy) Alfa Romeo
2009	(Italy) Ferrari	(Italy) Ferrari	Bugatti Type 37 – 1927	(France) Bugatti
2010	(Italy) Giuliano Canè	(Italy) Lucia Galliani	BMW 328 MM Coupé – 1939	(Germany) BMW
2011	(Italy) Giordano Mozzi	(Italy) Stefania Biacca	Aston Martin Le Mans – 1933	(United Kingdom) Aston Martin
2012	(Argentina) Scalise Claudio	(Argentina) Claramunt Daniel	Alfa Romeo 6C 1500 Gran Sport "Testa Fissa" – 1933	(Italy) Alfa Romeo
2013	(Argentina) Juan Tonconogy	(Argentina) Guillermo Berisso	Bugatti T40 – 1927	(France) Bugatti
2014	(Italy) Giordano Mozzi	(Italy) Stefania Biacca	Lancia Lambda tipo 221 spider Ca.Sa.Ro – 1928	(Italy) Lancia
2015	(Argentina) Juan Tonconogy	(Argentina) Guillermo Berisso	Bugatti T40 – 1927	(France) Bugatti
2016	(Italy) Andrea Vesco	(Italy) Andrea Guerini	Alfa Romeo 6C 1750 Gran Sport Spider Zagato – 1931	(Italy) Alfa Romeo
2017	(Italy) Andrea Vesco	(Italy) Andrea Guerini	Alfa Romeo 6C 1750 Gran Sport Spider Zagato – 1931	(Italy) Alfa Romeo
2018	(Argentina) Juan Tonconogy	(Argentina) Barbara Ruffini	Alfa Romeo 6C 1500 Gran Sport "Testa Fissa" Spider Zagato – 1933	(Italy) Alfa Romeo
2019	(Italy) Giovanni Moceri	(Italy) Daniele Bonetti	Alfa Romeo 6C 1500 Super Sport Spider Stabilimenti Farina – 1928	(Italy) Alfa Romeo
2020	(Italy) Andrea Vesco	(Italy) Roberto Vesco	Alfa Romeo 6C 1750 Gran Sport Spider Zagato – 1929	(Italy) Alfa Romeo
2021	(Italy) Andrea Vesco	(Italy) Fabio Salvinelli	Alfa Romeo 6C 1750 Gran Sport Spider Zagato – 1929	(Italy) Alfa Romeo
2022	(Italy) Andrea Vesco	(Italy) Fabio Salvinelli	Alfa Romeo 6C 1750 Gran Sport Spider Zagato – 1929	(Italy) Alfa Romeo
2023	(Italy) Andrea Vesco	(Italy) Fabio Salvinelli	Alfa Romeo 6C 1750 Gran Sport Spider Zagato – 1929	(Italy) Alfa Romeo
2024	(Italy) Andrea Vesco	(Italy) Fabio Salvinelli	Alfa Romeo 6C 1750 Gran Sport Spider Zagato – 1929	(Italy) Alfa Romeo
2025	(Italy) Andrea Vesco	(Italy) Fabio Salvinelli	Alfa Romeo 6C 1750 Gran Sport Spider Zagato – 1929	(Italy) Alfa Romeo
2026	(Argentina) Juan Tonconogy	(Argentina) Margarita Tonconogy	Alfa Romeo 6C 1750 Gran Sport Spider Zagato – 1931	(Italy) Alfa Romeo

=== Gallery ===
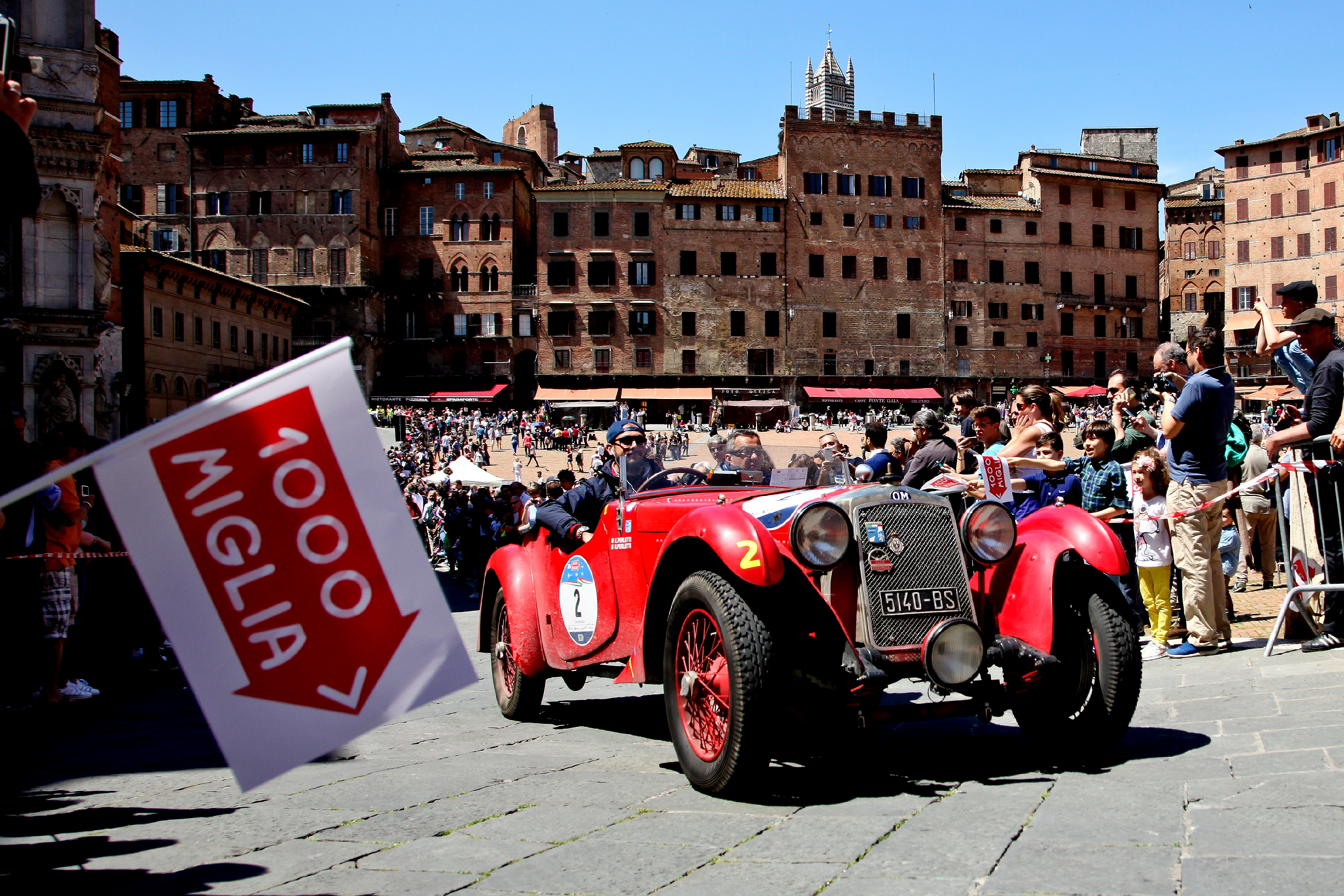
Passage through Siena

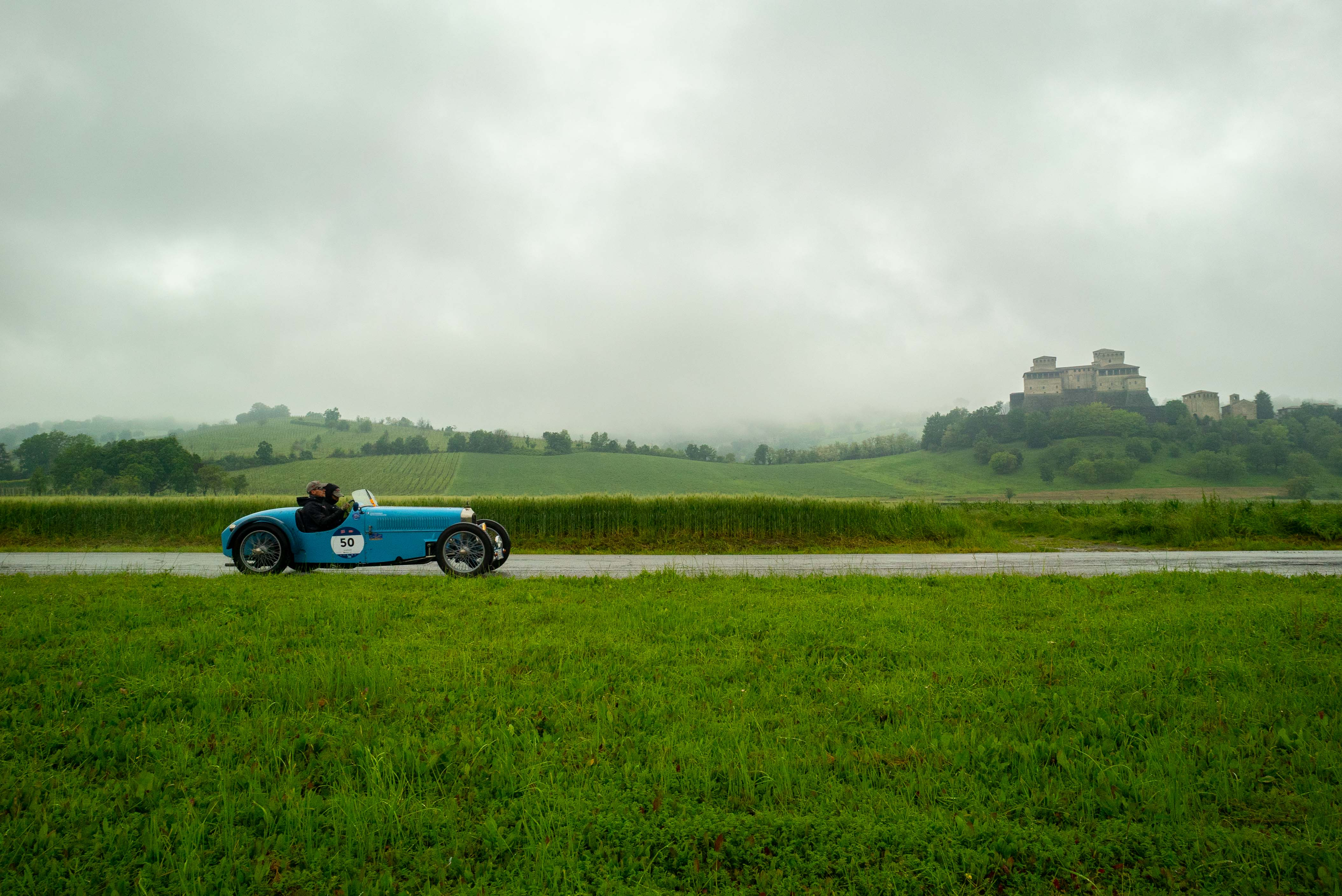
Passage through Emilia-Romagna region

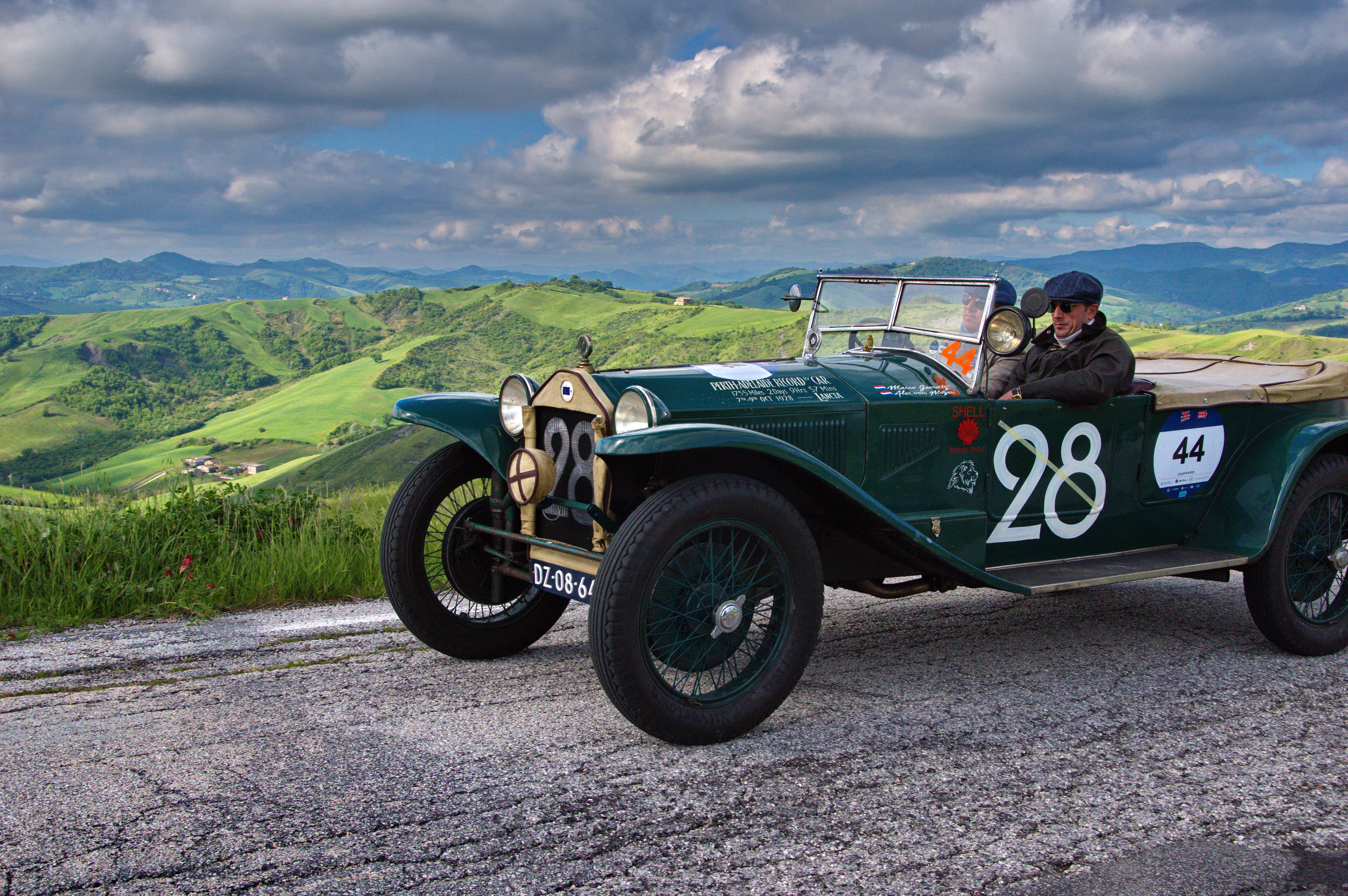
Lancia Lambda at the 2019 edition

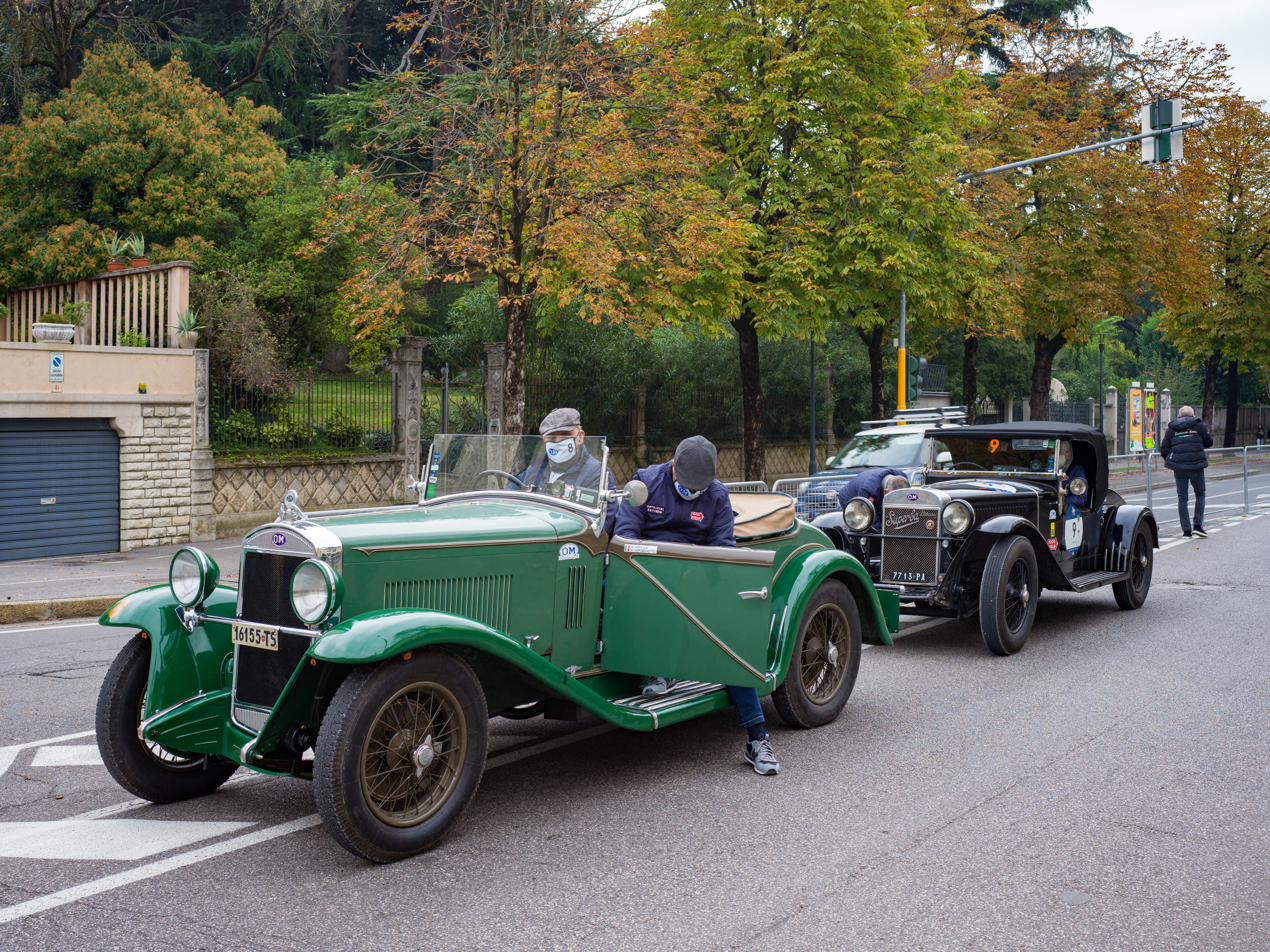
The 2020 edition of Mille Miglia Storica was postponed until autumn due to COVID-19 pandemic

== Mille Miglia Museum ==
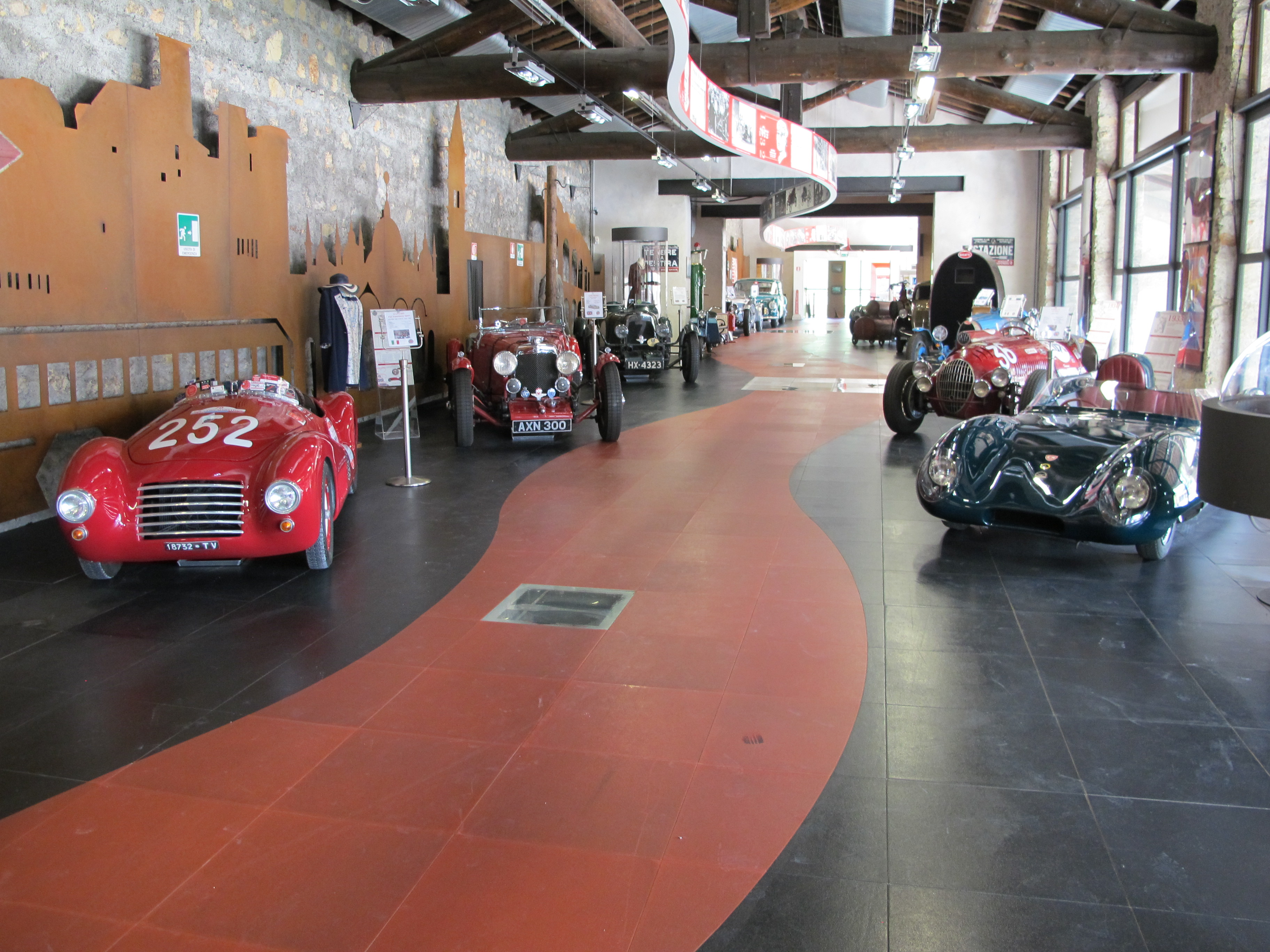
The Mille Miglia Museum in Brescia

Since November 2004, the former Monastery of Sant'Eufemia in Brescia houses the Mille Miglia Museum, which illustrates the history of this car race with films, memorabilia, dresses, posters, and a number of classic cars that are periodically replaced by other in case of participation in events.

== Name usage ==
Owner of the trademark logo of Mille Miglia is the Automobile Club Brescia.

Mille Miglia was also the name of Alitalia's frequent flyer program.

Mille Miglia is also the name of a jacket, named after the race, inspired by the 1920s racewear and designed by Massimo Osti for his CP Company clothing label. The garment features goggles built into the hood and originally had a small circular window in the sleeve enabling the wearer to see their watch. The jackets have been produced for a long period and are still popular with British football casuals.

As a sponsor and timekeeper of the Storica event, the event has lent its name and its trademark logo to Chopard for a series of sports watches. For promotions, Chopard uses photographs from the event by photographer Giacomo Bretzel.

Mille Miglia Red is the name for a colour used by Chevrolet on its Corvette models. The colour was offered between 1972 and 1975.

In 1982 the Mille Miglia endurance race was revived as a road rally event.

"Mille Miglia" is also the title of a song from Lucio Dalla's album Automobili (1976). The song describes anecdotes about the 1947 edition of the race.

Kaneko released two arcade games based on the race in 1994 (1000 Miglia: Great 1000 Miles Rally) and 1995 (Mille Miglia 2: Great 1000 Miles Rally). SCi Games released a PlayStation game simply named Mille Miglia and endorsed by Stirling Moss in 2000 in PAL regions.

In 2008, Alfa Romeo created a limited-edition version of its Tipo 939 Spider called the "Mille Miglia". Only 11 cars were built—eight left-hand drive and three right-hand drive—with each numbered car corresponding to one of the marque's Mille Miglia victories. Each car carried a small metal plate with details of the race.

== In media ==
The film Ferrari (2023), directed by Michael Mann and written by Troy Kennedy Martin, follows the personal and professional struggles of Enzo Ferrari, the Italian founder of the car manufacturer Ferrari, during the summer of 1957 as Scuderia Ferrari prepares to compete in the 1957 Mille Miglia. Adam Driver portrays the titular subject, and Penélope Cruz, Shailene Woodley, Sarah Gadon, Gabriel Leone, Jack O'Connell, and Patrick Dempsey co-star.

== See also ==
- List of major automobile races in Italy
- California Mille, an annual historic and classic car tour run on public roads in California
