= Goggle jacket =

Hooded windproof type jacket

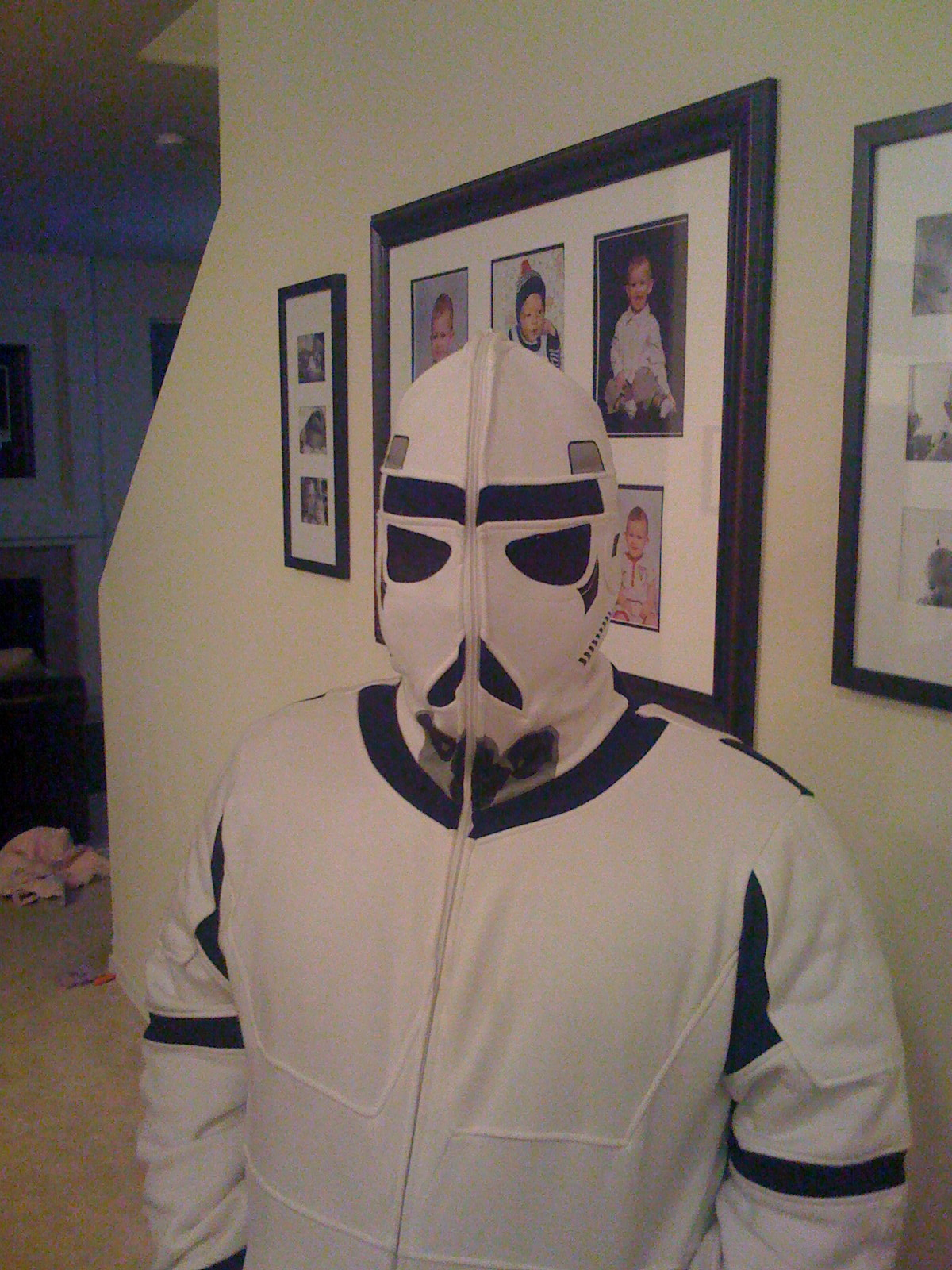
Hoodie that zips all the way to the top of the hood to look like a Stormtrooper, with the black patches over the eyes and mouth being mesh

Goggle jackets are a hooded windproof type jacket released in 1988 made by C.P. Company for the sponsoring of Mille Miglia and open car endurance race and became popular across Europe and in Britain. They zip up to cover the head and face completely, except for two built-in goggles, sometimes covered with transparent mesh or various lenses and sometimes including a mesh mouth area for ease of breathing.

Some people wear them to protect their faces against cold and driven rain, some for concealment.

== Criticism ==
Police have claimed goggle jackets could be used by gangs and criminals to conceal their identity. A Northumbria Police spokesman said the jackets were totally legal. "A hat, scarf and glasses combination could obscure someone's identity so there are no legal powers to stop anyone wearing these jackets." he added. One web site calls them "burqas for the boys".

== See also ==
- Anorak
- Hoodie
