= California Mille =

Annual car tour in California, US

The California Mille logo.

The California Mille is an annual historic and classic car tour run on public roads in California.

It is inspired by the Mille Miglia, a former Italian open-road endurance race covering some 1500 km (or roughly 1000 miles) from Brescia-to-Rome-to-Brescia and ran twenty-four times from 1927 to 1957. The event was founded by Martin Swig and Ken Shaff in 1991. Collectible car insurance company Hagerty became the organizer in 2020.

== Eligibility ==
The California Mille is open to cars that either ran or would have been eligible to run in the original event; hence participants cars must be designs from 1957 or earlier. The California Mille field is limited to 65 cars and applicants are screened for their car's historical significance and general condition; not all applicants are accepted. Fields generally include vintage Alfa Romeos, Ferraris, Mercedes-Benz and Porsches. Often pre-war examples are well represented in the fields as well as the more common post-war models.

== Course ==
Each year's event covers no less than 1000 miles over four days. Though the route changes each year, it invariably starts at the Fairmont Hotel in San Francisco and consists of back roads through some California's most scenic areas, including Highway 1 along Northern California's coast, Napa and Sonoma valleys, and the Sierra Nevadas. Each day is punctuated by several stops for meals and refreshments, arrangements having been made at significant wineries and restaurants, while overnight accommodation is generally at some of California's best hotels.

A California Highway Patrol escort accompanies the group to facilitate traffic control and communications.

== Social context ==
The event was founded in 1991 by automotive enthusiast Martin Swig and friends, it is supported by an informal group called the "Amici americani della Mille Miglia" ("American friends of the Mille Miglia" in Italian). The event attracts a number of corporate sponsors which have included Daimler-Chrysler, Jaguar and Il Fornaio restaurants. The corporate sponsorship ensures that the California Mille remains one of the more exclusive and high quality events of its type. It does this by underwriting a substantial entourage of mechanical support and press that follows the event route. The event's proceeds benefit causes such as the 11-99 Foundation, a benefit fund for California Highway Patrol officers and their families.

Participants range from run-of-the-mill enthusiasts, though wealthy people by most standards, (Note: The entry fee is $4,000 plus) to captains of the automotive industry and motor sport figures, including Bob Lutz. The event has attracted participants from throughout the world, including South America, Australia, Japan, and Europe.
