= Paninaro =

Italian subculture of designer clothing

Paninaro (Italian: [paniˈnaːro]) was a social phenomenon in northern Italy during the 1980s that was characterized by an obsession with designer clothing and adherence to a lifestyle based on luxury consumption.

It began in the Milanese metropolitan area, later spreading throughout continental Italy. The phenomenon led to the creation of magazines, films and television programs. Italian designer brands associated with Paninaro such as Stone Island, C.P. Company, Armani, and Fila were adopted by members of the football casual subculture in the United Kingdom.

== History ==
In the early 1980s the areas of Milan were frequented by groups of young people with their own rules and styles, such as metalheads or goths. Within this context, a group was established, which consisted predominantly of youngsters, who met at the local area of Piazza San Babila. This group defined its own vocabulary and created a trend based on the ostentation of very expensive designer garments. At the same time the fashion industry, having identified the new style, began to provide conforming garments and accessories at affordable prices. This phenomenon evolved initially in the sandwich bars and fast food restaurants of the center of Milan, then having spread throughout Italy, also spread abroad. The meeting places, sandwich shops and fast food restaurants, where quick meals could be eaten, therefore also determined their name.

The term derives, more specifically, from a bar in Milan, the Al panino bar, the usual haunt of the first group of paninari, a group of boys who had coded their own jargon and their own clothing, based fundamentally on certain items of clothing and accessories of famous Italian or foreign brands. The phenomenon was born in the early eighties as an expression of the wave of reflux and disengagement that followed the turbulent and politicized previous decade. It rejected every form of social commitment and focused on enjoying life without too many worries, conforming to the models of American-style consumer capitalism as disseminated through television commercials and Hollywood movies. The new values that were affirmed are: "to function, to show that you are worthy, have a perfect body and image, be fashionable, make a career." Curiously, however, the paninari did not wear the typical clothing of American yuppies, the young in career, but typical clothing of the American working class such as Timberland boots, Levi's jeans, checkered shirts, boots and belts typical of woodcutters, but all strictly branded and very expensive.

The female counterpart of the paninaro was called a sfitinzia or squinzia which, according to the dictionaries, can be defined as a girl with a smirk, not very intelligent, flirtatious, often in fashion but according to the original meaning of 1986, written by Lina Sotis, who is a communist columnist, the squinzia is "The most widespread female category of the moment. They all had an imprinting, the television show of the second evening shows, clothes, tones of voice, lengths, courtships and stiletto heels: in the squinzia everything, except the brain, is exaggerated. The squinzia is the one that would like to catch more and pecks less, it is the eternal turkey and never taken."

The phenomenon quickly spread throughout Italy thanks to commercial television that exploited the phenomenon by amplifying the message and spreading the style. Its fame increased further due to a character played by the actor Enzo Braschi. He provided a stereotyped version of the paninaro in a successful TV show, Drive In, which helped spread the fashion by codifying in turn some stylistic features to which many young people from all over Italy tried to conform. The success is such that even magazines dedicated to the phenomenon and addressed to the paninari like Il Paninaro, with a circulation that reached 100,000 monthly copies, followed by Wild Boys, inspired by the homonymous song of Duran Duran and sung by Braschi in his parody, Zippo Panino, Il Cucador as well as the female versions like Preppy and Sfitty.

The beginnings of the phenomenon were observed in Milan in a historical period of settlement of the Italian currency and of important signs of economic recovery, followed by relative well-being and greater availability of consumer goods. With the expansion of fashion, the formation of groups was natural, each with its own meeting point as a bar and a relative territory in the neighborhood; even very large groups, whose attendance could reach hundreds of people. On Saturday afternoons and evenings they were the meeting place for mass gatherings with subsequent transfer to one of the clubs that lent themselves well to exploit this phenomenon. Some of these groups, the most important ones, had very popular local leaders, usually with nicknames. The places of frequentation had a period of ephemeral life or changed name and company name in a short time, based on the trend and taste of the visitors.

A characteristic feature of the paninari was the food consumed in some fast-food restaurant chains, which began to spread throughout Italy in those years. In Rome, for example, the opening of the first McDonald's restaurant in 1986 in Piazza di Spagna was a memorable event for the paninari of the Italian capital. In Milan, by contrast, most of the various panini companies met in normal bars scattered throughout the city, and the dozens of Burghy's fast-food restaurants (with the exception of Piazza San Babila and Corso Re Vittorio Emanuele II), Wendy's and King Burger (not to be confused with Burger King which arrived in Italy only in 1999), the two so-called "second choices", were little frequented by the members of this youth subculture.

In a short time the paninari become a phenomenon of custom by acquiring a discreet reputation on a national level, above all thanks to the publication of some comics dedicated to the paninari and the character played by Enzo Braschi in Drive In. In 1986 the Pet Shop Boys, following a visit to the center of Milan, recorded the single "Paninaro", which allowed the fashion to cross national borders. The protagonists of the video clip, shot in Milan, were some young men perfectly dressed according to the dictates of fashion.

The phenomenon initially did not have political connotations because social commitment was not in the interests of the groups that conformed to paninari aesthetics. Instead, there was a sort of class consciousness that led them to refuse contacts with other young people from different social backgrounds: the paninari, at least in the original Milanese core which had the premises in the Piazza San Babila area, were the sons of the bourgeoisie medium-high class and therefore had monetary freedom that allowed the purchase of particularly expensive clothing.

Subsequently, a political conscience of conservative inspiration began to arise, which led to conflicts with groups of different political identities. However, the phenomenon was brief and had effectively ended by the end of the decade; replaced by other subcultures that took note of the end of the period characterized by optimism and carefreeness. Fashion was exhausted in Milan at the end of the decade and in the rest of Italy shortly thereafter, replaced by other subcultures that reflected the end of a decade consumed under the banner of hedonism and superficiality.

In general it can be said that paninari fashion has been linked to the very young middle and high school students. At least, in Milan the paninari were almost totally absent from the universities. The header on the main headboard, Paninaro, initially I veri galli (lit. 'The real roosters'), accompanied the time of leaving the scene with Pochi, duri, giusti (lit. 'Few, hard, right'). As with any past fashion, especially in Milan, revival evenings are held at discos, whose customers are now adult veterans, encouraged to dress in the fashions of the time.

== See also ==
- Raggare
- Fashion in Italy and France
- Italian economic miracle
- Casuals
