= C.P. Company =

Italian apparel brand

- Founded: 1971
- Founder: Massimo Osti
- Website: www.cpcompany.com

C.P. Company is an Italian apparel brand founded in 1971 by designer Massimo Osti. Initially called Chester Perry by the suggestion of his fashion entrepreneur friend Corrado Zannoni, its name was changed in 1978 following a lawsuit by Chester Barrie and Fred Perry, for the use of their first name and surname.

C.P. Company clothing design often conducts research and design into military uniforms and work suits. It became known for its functional, military-inspired outerwear and the use of innovative fabrics, processing techniques and design. Its "Mille Miglia jacket" (also known as "Goggle jacket", 1988), features two clear lenses on the hood—the "goggle"—and one on the wrist, for the wristwatch. Since 1975 C.P. Company has produced over 40,000 garments. Today, the brand has generated a large following within English 'football hooligan' subculture. C.P. Company continues to deliver modern field jackets, soft shell goggle jackets, lens sleeve sweatshirts, and more.

== Ownership ==
In 1984, Osti sold his company shares to GFT (Gruppo Finanziario Tessile), but stayed on as the brand's stylist until 1994. In 1993 the brand was acquired by Carlo Rivetti. Rivetti changed the name of the company from C.P. Company to Sportswear Company. In 2010 it was sold to Enzo Fusco's FGF Industry S.P.A. In 2015, the company's intellectual property was bought by Hong Kong apparel group Tristate Holdings Limited (SEHK: 458).

== History ==
C.P. Company was founded in 1971 in Bologna, Italy, by designer Massimo Osti (1944–2005). The brand was originally called Chester Perry but following joint legal action by the British menswear brands Chester Barrie and Fred Perry, the name was changed to C.P. Company in 1978. Initially the company produced t-shirts screen-printed with graphic designs developed by Osti, but by 1973 the brand started to produce other garments including jackets, trousers, and shirts. In 1984 Osti sold the company to GFT (Gruppo Finanziario Tessile) but stayed working with the company as a designer until 1994. In 1993 the company was bought by Carlo Rivetti (b. 1956) and became part of a larger group called Sportswear Company S.p.A. Massimo Osti resigned as creative director in 1994, and Romeo Gigli (b. 1949) was employed as the brand’s creative director, designing menswear, and launching a womenswear line. In 1997, Moreno Ferrari (b. 1952) succeeded Gigli as creative director. In 2001 Alessandro Pungetti was announced as the company's new creative director, where he remained in this role until 2009 when Wallace Faulds (b. 1979) was appointed by Carlo Rivetti as the new head of design. C.P. Company was sold by Rivetti to FGF Industry SpA in 2010. Alessandro Pungetti was reappointed as joint creative director alongside Paul Harvey in 2012. In 2015 FGF Industry SpA sold the company to Tristate Holdings Limited. In 2019, Lorenzo Osti, the son of Massimo Osti, was appointed president of C.P. Company. The brand opened a flagship store in Milan in 2019, followed by new retail locations in Amsterdam in September 2020, Riccione in June 2021, and London in 2022.

== Garment Dyeing and textile innovation ==
An important element of C.P. Company's design aesthetic is the use of complex dye processes to generate a range of finishes to garments across their product line. In 1974 C.P. Company started developing whole garment dyeing (Tinto in capo) as a technique of removing the stiffness from new fabrics and giving a worn appearance to final garments including T-shirts, trousers, jackets, and knitwear. C.P. Company established a technologically advanced dyeing laboratory in Ravarino, Italy to develop processes for whole garment dyeing, as there were no existing industrial processes for this treatment at the time. This resulted in the development of a number of new techniques, which were subsequently adopted by other fashion brands. The brand also developed new methods for dyeing garments that are constructed from different fibres, such as cotton and nylon, by applying multiple dyes in a single process, which results in an extensive range of finishes including a dual-colour appearance. This method enabled the company to purchase large quantities of a single raw material at a lower price, which could then be used over multiple seasons while appearing completely different due to the dyeing processes used. In addition to garment dyeing (Tinto in capo) C.P. Company were instrumental in the development of several other fabrics and treatments including 50 Fili, Velvet Wool, Rubber Wool and Rubber Flax. More recently the brand has utilised a variety of other cutting-edge materials including Dynafil TS-70, Dyneema, Chrome, Taylon L, NyBer, P.Ri.S.M, Polartec Alpha, Micro-M, and M.T.t.n.

== Garment-based research ==
C. P. Company’s design process was initially informed by Osti’s substantial garment archive, which was used to research archetypal military, industrial, or utilitarian garments and reinterpret details of their design to inform new design outcomes. By 1996 the archive contained over 35,000 garments. This approach to design was exemplified by the launch in 1991 of the Continuative Garments range from C.P. Company, which saw variations of the same garments being reissued each season, with the use of innovative fabrication and dyeing techniques used to transform these garments. It enabled the brand to perfect and refine a series of core garments, including the Mille Miglia jacket which was based on the Swiss Alpenflage M70 military jacket and features multiple pockets. The Mille Miglia jacket also featured two plastic lenses in the hood which were inspired by research that Osti undertook on protective hoods and anti-gas masks produced during the Second World War. The first Mille Miglia jackets were produced by C.P. Company in 1988 and were initially given away to the organisers and competitors of the Mille Miglia (1000 Miles) endurance race, which the brand sponsored in 1998 and 1989. In 2009, the company invited designer Aitor Throup to design the 20th anniversary version of the Mille Miglia jacket, which was subsequently shortlisted by The Design Museum, London for the Designs of the Year Award 2010.

== Urban Protection range ==
Following his appointment at creative director Moreno Ferrari developed the Urban Protection range which was launched in 1997 and was produced each season until 2001. It built on the brand’s approach to continuative garments, but while these had previously been constructed in predominantly natural fibres such as linen, cotton, leather, and wool, the Urban Protection range used an industrial nylon, Dynafil TS-70, in nearly all of the collection’s outerwear. In addition, several garments in the range featured built-in technology, including torches, headphones, personal alarms, and pollution detectors, and were given evocative names such as Metropolis, Atlas, Life, LED, R.E.M., Move, and Rest. Ferrari's approach to the Urban Protection range has been widely interpreted as being influenced by the concept of the non-place, which was first explored by Marc Auge in his 1995 book Non-Places: Introduction to an Anthropology of Supermodernity. Curator Andrew Bolton noted that the garments' functionality aligned with the transitional spaces of the airport, highway, and subway. While Ferrari described these non-places as, '...anonymous spaces which annul our soul; a soul which we all pretend to forget about, but which can suddenly re-emerge to remind us who we are and what we really need.' Ferrari later designed the Transformables range for Spring Summer 2000 that included several inflatable or transforming garments constructed from blue-tinted transparent polyurethane, reinforced by a carbon coating. The garments included a coat that turned into a mattress, a jacket that inflated into a chair, and a coat that turned into a kite. In 2006, the Transformables Parka/Air Mattress was exhibited at the Museum of Modern Art in New York and is now held in their permanent collection. The Urban Protection range was relaunched in 2020, with a reworking of the Metropolis jacket in Dyneema, which is marketed as the world’s strongest fibre

== Collaborations ==
As part of the celebrations around the brand’s 50th anniversary in 2021, C.P. Company produced a series of collaborations with several other brands, including Patta, adidas Spezial, Barbour, Clarks Originals, and Emporio Armani. In 2024 the collabaration pluriannuel con Manchester city pour son équipement d'avant match .

In 2023 a collaborative capsule collection with British streetwear brand Palace was produced, based on reinterpretations of classic garments from C.P. Company’s own archive. The brand has also collaborated with a number of musicians, including Kano, Sergio Pizzorno of Kasabian, Liam Gallagher, and the band Gorillaz, to create capsule collections. While notable musicians who have worn the brand include Noel Gallagher, Liam Gallagher, Bez from the Happy Mondays, and Damon Albarn who wore the Aitor Throup-designed Mille Miglia on the cover of his 2014 album Everyday Robots.

== Subcultural influence ==
The casual subculture that emerged during the late 1970s on the football terraces in the United Kingdom was notable for its adoption Italian brands that were difficult to find in the United Kingdom at the time. By the mid-1980s, C.P. Company began to be worn by casuals in the United Kingdom, along with other Italian brands such as Stone Island, Fila, Tacchini, Emporio Armani, Ellesse, Benetton, and Fiorucci. Particular jackets, such as the Mille Miglia goggle jacket and later the Metropolis, became iconic within the casual subculture due to C.P. Company's emphasis on distinctive outerwear. The integrated goggles in the Mille Miglia jacket also made it easy for wearers to conceal their identity from CCTV cameras and police surveillance officers. By the late 1990s and early 2000s the brands Mille Miglia jacket which had been issued each season as part of the company’s Continuative Garments range had come to symbolise the casual subculture, with illustrations of football casuals wearing the jacket appearing on numerous t-shirts manufactured by other brands, such as 80s Casuals and Casual Connoisseurs, highlighting the jacket's iconic status within the subculture. The jacket was also featured on the cover of Phil Thornton’s 2003 book Casuals: Football, Fighting and Fashion: The Story of a Terrace Cult. In 2022, The Art of the Terraces exhibition at the Walker Gallery, Liverpool which examined the connection between casual culture and art, featured a number of artworks featuring the jacket by artists including as Peter O'Toole, Jens Wagner, Jamie Pike, and Paul Curtis. Between 1985 and 1993 C.P. Company published its own biannual magazine in Italian, English, and Japanese, which features the new seasons collections, with each issue selling 50,000 copies. In 2022, C.P. Company introduced a new magazine called Arcipelago which is published biannually.
