= Monestier-de-Clermont =

- Commune
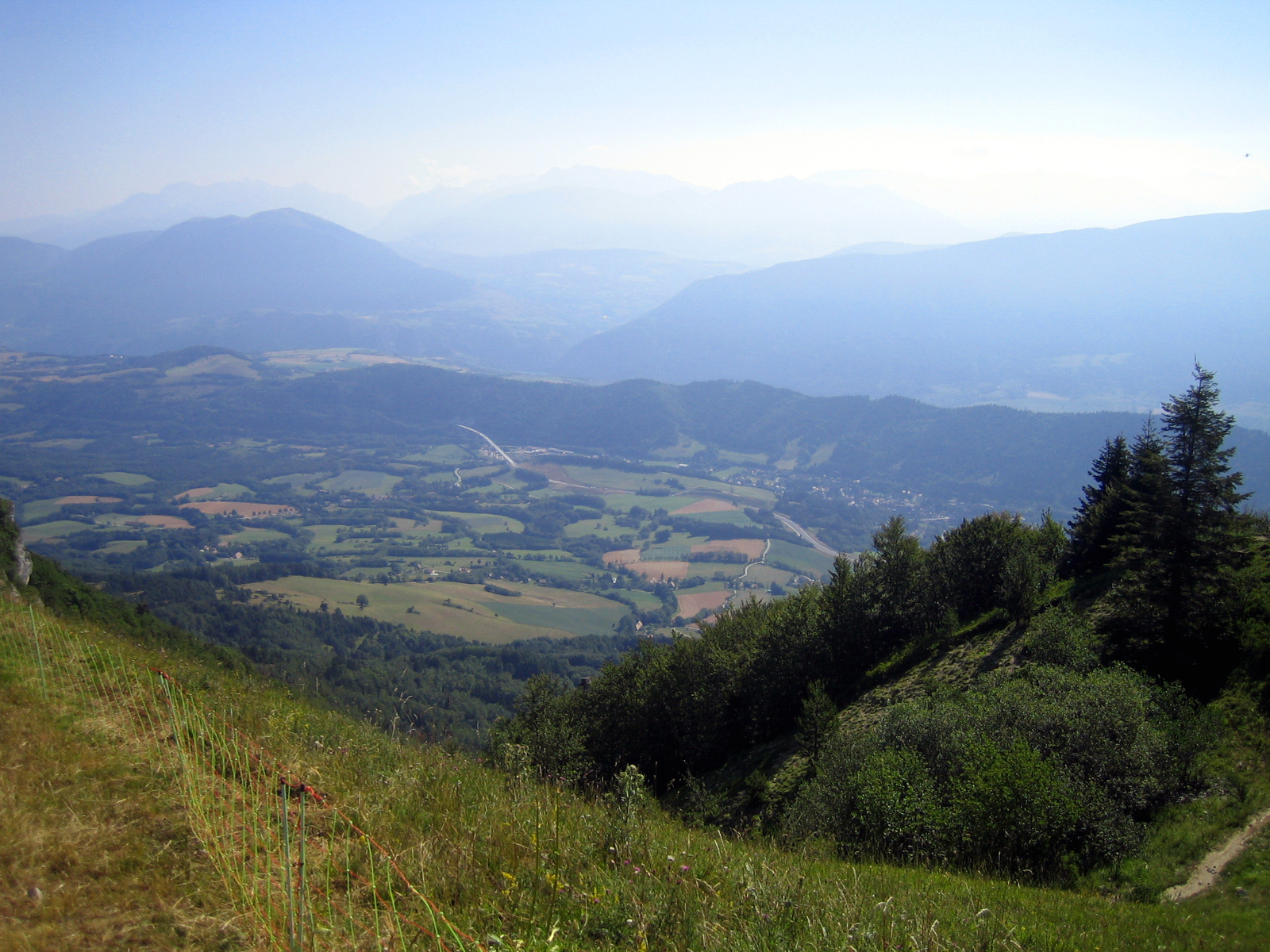
- A general view of Monestier-de-Clermont

- Coat of arms
- Location of Monestier-de-Clermont
- Location within France Location within Auvergne-Rhône-Alpes
- Coordinates: 44°55′04″N 5°38′10″E
- Country: France
- Region: Auvergne-Rhône-Alpes
- Department: Isère
- Arrondissement: Grenoble
- Canton: Matheysine-Trièves

Government
  - Mayor (2020–2026): Éric Furmanczak
- Area^{1}: 5 km^{2} (1.9 sq mi)
- Elevation: 832 m (2,730 ft)
- Highest elevation: 1,070 m (3,510 ft)
- Lowest elevation: 679 m (2,228 ft)
- Population (2023): 1,478
  - Density: 300/km^{2} (770/sq mi)
- Time zone: UTC+01:00 (CET)
  - Summer (DST): UTC+02:00 (CEST)
- INSEE/Postal code: 38242 /38650
- ^{1} French Land Register data, which excludes lakes, ponds, glaciers > 1 km^{2} (0.386 sq mi or 247 acres) and river estuaries.

Monestier-de-Clermont (French pronunciation: [mɔnɛstje də klɛʁmɔ̃]) is a commune in the Isère department in southeastern France.

== Population ==
Historical population
Year	Pop.	±% p.a.
1968	787	—
1975	726	−1.15%
1982	736	+0.20%
1990	905	+2.62%
1999	921	+0.19%
2007	1,130	+2.59%
2012	1,355	+3.70%
2017	1,427	+1.04%
2023	1,478	+0.59%
Source: INSEE

== See also ==
- Communes of the Isère department
