= Stone Island =

Italian men's apparel brand

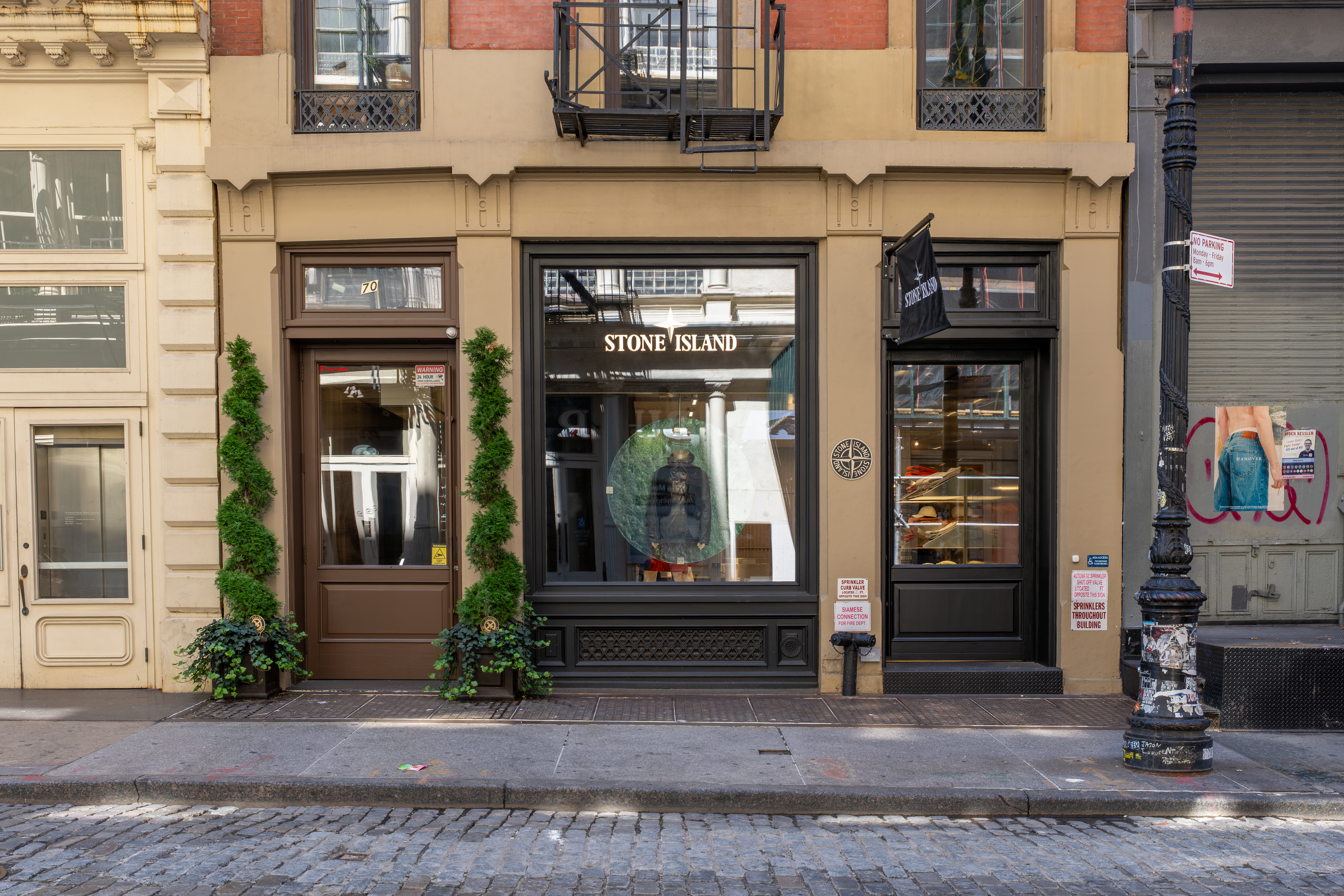
- Store in SoHo, Manhattan
- Type: Società per azioni
- Industry: Textile
- Founded: 1982; 44 years ago in Ravarino, Italy
- Founder: Massimo Osti
- Headquarters: Milano, Italy
- Key people: Robert Triefus (President and CEO)
- Revenue: €411.2 million (2025)
- Parent: Moncler
- Website: Stone Island

Stone Island is an Italian sportswear brand headquartered in Ravarino, Emilia-Romagna. Its brand is a nautical star and compass printed or overlaid on a button-on cloth badge with green, yellow, and black detailing.

The brand combines influences from sportswear and nautical apparel with details inspired by military uniforms, and is characterized by a functional aesthetic and the use of innovative textiles, including reflective fabrics, dyeing recipes, and fabric treatments.

It is a staple of youth subculture including Italian Paninari, English football casuals, British, American, and Canadian hip hop culture. In the sports world, the brand was initially associated with football supporters, but, over time, it was endorsed by athletes and sports celebrities, including Éric Cantona, David Beckham, Pep Guardiola, and Paolo Maldini, contributing to Stone Island’s broader mainstream recognition.

It was acquired by the Italian fashion house Moncler in 2020 for €1.15 billion.

== History ==
Designer Massimo Osti founded Stone Island in 1982, in Ravarino, Italy.

The origins of the brand are closely tied to textile experimentation: Osti was studying a truck tarpaulin fabric, a rigid double-sided material coated on both sides with differently colored pigmented resins and subsequently subjected to an intensive enzyme “stone wash” treatment. The result was a durable fabric with a worn, faded appearance, which was used to create an initial collection of seven outerwear pieces, each produced in six two-tone variations. The fabric was named Tela Stella.

The name Stone Island is derived from pre-modernist writer Joseph Conrad's novels wherein the words "stone" and "island" appear most frequently. According to founder Massimo Osti, his novels' exploration of "boats and sea" moved him to create a brand with "[a] new sensibility oriented to science instead of fashion". The brand developed around a design approach centred on functionality, material research, and garment performance rather than seasonal fashion trends.

The focus on functionality led Massimo Osti to draw inspiration from military uniforms, technical gear, and workwear, elements that helped define the brand’s industrial aesthetic from its earliest years.

=== Rivetti’s era ===
In 1983, Massimo Osti decided to focus exclusively on the creative direction of the company. That same year, the Gruppo Finanziario Tessile (GFT) of Turin acquired a stake in Stone Island, also through the involvement of Carlo Rivetti, who at the time was active in the family business. Initially, Osti sold 50% of Stone Island to GFT (Gruppo Finanziario Tessile) in 1983, before selling the remaining half to GFT in 1991. GFT sold Stone Island in 1993 to Italian businessman Carlo Rivetti, who combined the label with C.P. Company Sportswear Company SpA. Osti left Stone Island at the end of 1995.

Looking for a new creative director, Rivetti identified the English designer Paul Harvey in 1996. Harvey continued the company’s experimental approach by collaborating with manufacturers of technical materials, including DuPont, active in the military and medical sectors. During his tenure at the company, Harvey also designed the women’s line Serie 100.

In 2008, Rivetti entrusted the brand's creative direction to an international team, marking the beginning of a more collaborative phase for the company. Among the figures who joined during this period was designer Errolson Hugh, who became responsible for the Shadow Project, the brand's experimental sub-line focused on technical innovation.

Stone Island rapidly became popular during the 1990s in Europe and Japan, and during the 2010s, in the U.S. and Canada.

In the early months of 2010, Sportswear Company sold C.P. Company to FGF Industry, led by Enzo Fusco. In 2011, Stone Island, following the separation from C.P. Company, recorded a 4% increase in turnover, reaching €51 million in revenue.

In 2017, Singaporean sovereign wealth fund Temasek Holdings bought out a 30% stake in Stone Island valued at €345 million.

=== Acquisition by Moncler ===
On 7 December 2020, Moncler S.p.A. announced the acquisition of Stone Island for €1.15 billion, a transaction completed on 31 March 2021, when the brand officially became part of the Moncler Group.The Rivetti family became shareholders in the controlling holding company.

In 2023, Robert Triefus was appointed Chief Executive Officer of Stone Island, and in the following year he also became Chairman of the company.

== Brand ==
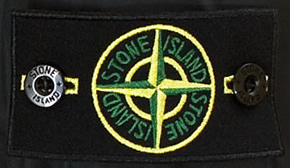
Stone Island's yellow-green Compass Badge, 2013

The logo references a compass, affixed with a nautical star. It is recognizable by the use of a cloth badge that features the compass design on the left side of a garment.

Stone Island focuses on technical apparel research, development, and manufacturing. It is known for its approach to fabrication through a range of dyeing techniques and surface treatments. These include the use of Raso Gommato in 1983, thermosensitive fabric in 1987, rubber wool in 1987, and reflective fabric in 1991. Originally, the patches were green edged, but from around the year 2000 onwards they became black edged.

The brand became popular during the 1980s and 1990s in Europe during the football casual scene and during the 2010s, in the U.S. and Canada.

== Collections ==
Stone Island offers several collections characterised by functional design and experimentation with materials and textile treatments.

In addition to its main collection and the Junior line (ages 2–14), the brand presents four recurring sub-collections:

- Stone Island Ghost, consisting of monochromatic garments;
- Stone Island Marina, which reinterprets the brand’s nautical theme by drawing on its historical archive;
- Stone Island Stellina, characterised by a minimalist and functional design;
- Stone Island Denim Research, produced in denim fabric.

== Collaborations ==
Over the years, Stone Island has collaborated with several design companies such as Adidas, New Balance, Supreme, Nike (NikeLab), Porter, Persol and in 2024 with Dior.

== Campaigns ==
From 2008 onwards, and for over fifteen years, Stone Island adopted a distinctive visual approach in its advertising campaigns, characterised by isolated garments and models presented in close-up on neutral backgrounds.

Since 2024, under the creative direction of Ferdinando Verderi, the brand has introduced a new visual framework as part of the project Community as a Form of Research, featuring portraits photographed by David Sims against a light background. The subjects are drawn from outside the fashion industry, including athletes, actors, musicians, and creatives representing the brand’s global community.
