= Casual (subculture) =

Subsection of association football culture

The casual subculture is a subset of football culture that is characterised by the wearing of expensive designer clothing and hooliganism. The subculture emerged in the United Kingdom during the late 1970s, as a significant number of young men attending football matches began wearing clothing produced by designer sportswear brands, including Burberry, Fred Perry, Sergio Tacchini, Lacoste, Fila, Lyle & Scott, and Ellesse. In the 1980s, casuals also began to wear other Italian brands including Diadora, Stone Island and C.P. Company. Some participants dislike the term 'casuals', preferring the term ‘dresser’, with regional variations including Perry boys, trendies, and scallies.

== History ==
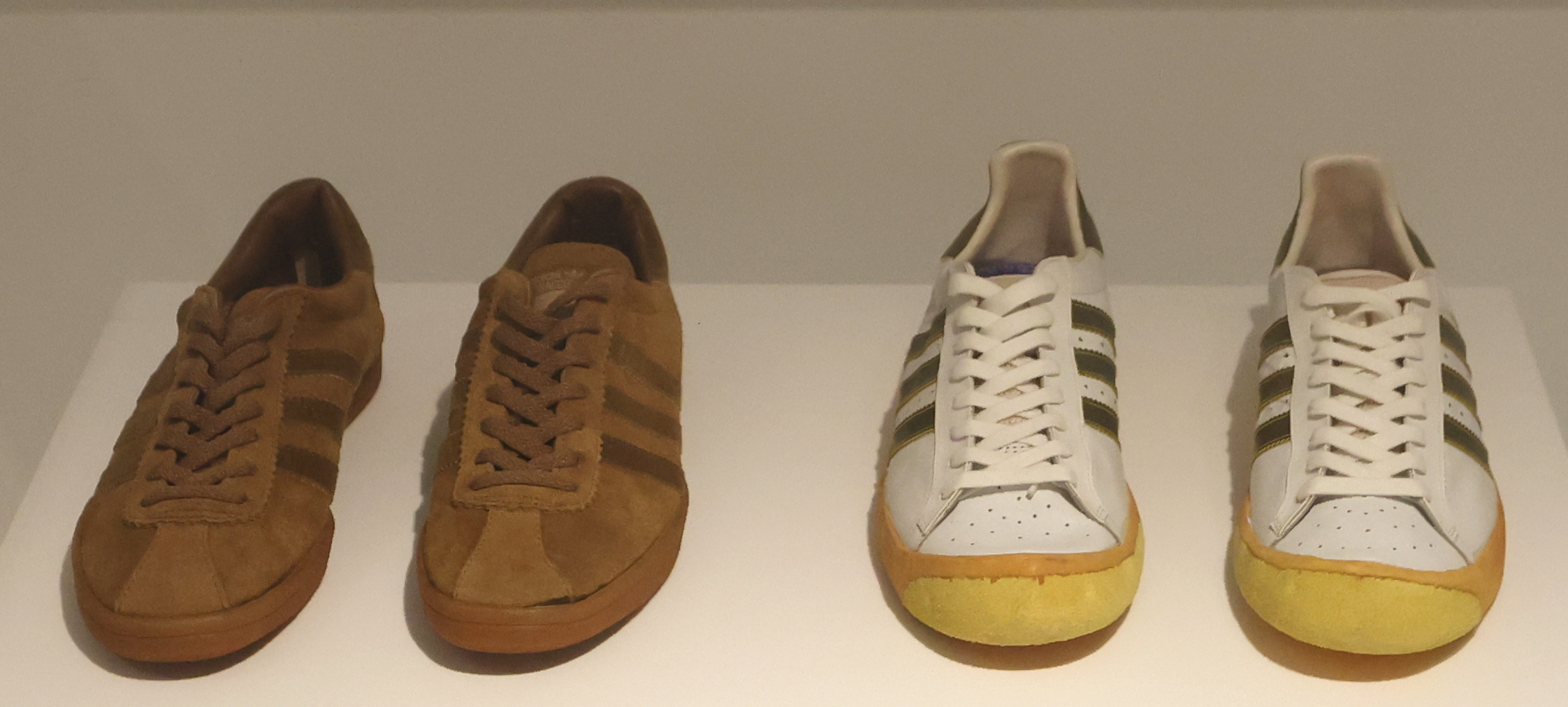
Examples of the types of Adidas trainers worn by members of the subculture

The designer clothing and fashion aspect of the casual subculture began in the mid-to-late 1970s. One documented precursor, according to Colin Blaney, was a subculture known as Perry Boys, which originated in the mid-1970s as a precursor to the casuals. The Perry Boys subculture consisted of Manchester United football hooligans (known as the Red Army) styling their hair into a flick and wearing sportswear, Fred Perry shirts, Adidas trainers and Dunlop Green Flash trainers. Many Mods wore Perry clothing and sportswear, and subsequently became Perry Boys from the mid-seventies onwards.

However, the original and early precursor was the notable trend of Liverpool youths starting to dress differently from other football fans at the time in Peter Storm jackets, straight-leg jeans and Adidas trainers. Liverpool F.C. fans were also the first British football fans to wear continental European fashions, which they picked up while following their teams at matches in Europe during their successful campaigns in the UEFA Cup and European Cup in the 1970s and 1980s.

== In popular culture ==
Casuals have been portrayed in films and television programmes such as I.D., The Firm, The Football Factory, and Green Street. The documentary Casuals: The Story of the Legendary Terrace Fashion, featuring Pat Nevin, Peter Hooton and Gary Bushell amongst others, is about the fashion that started in the late 1970s and into the 1980s.

== See also ==
- Chav
- Lad culture
- List of hooligan firms
- List of subcultures
- Prole drift
- Yobbo
- Ultras
- Paninaro
