= List of outerwear =

Clothing worn over street dress for warmth and protection

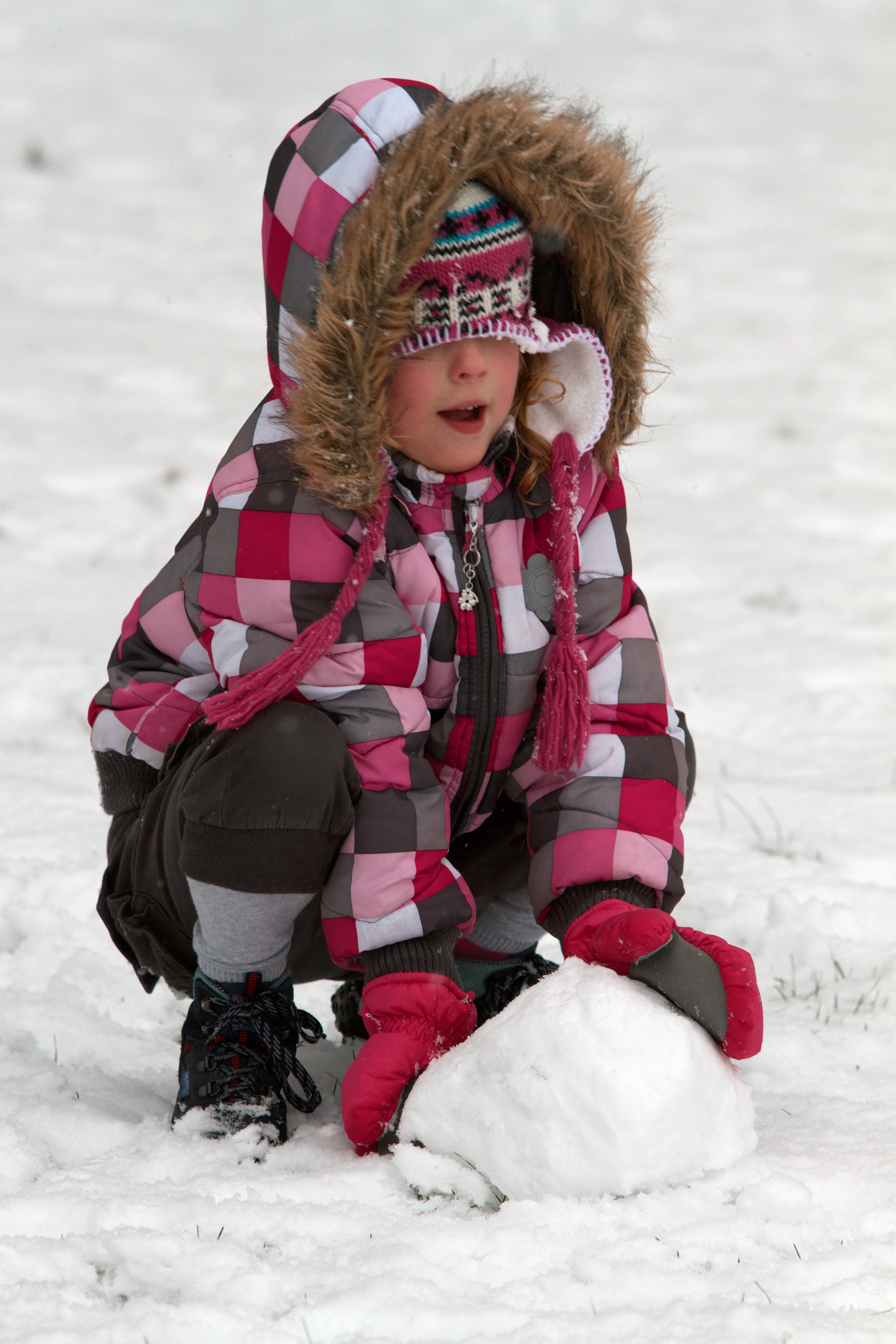
Outdoor wear for snowy weather

Outerwear is clothing and accessories worn outdoors, or clothing designed to be worn as protective layers outside other garments, as opposed to underwear. It can be worn for formal or casual occasions, or as warm clothing during winter.

== List of outerwear ==
- Academic gown
- Anorak
- Apron
- Blazer
- Cagoule
- Cape
- Cloak
- Coat
- Duffle coat
- Duster
- Frock coat
- Gilet
- Goggle jacket
- Greatcoat
- Hat
- Hoodie
- Jacket
- Leather jacket
- Matchcoat
- Mess jacket
- Mino (straw cape)
- Opera coat
- Overcoat
- Pea coat
- Poncho
- Pants
- Raincoat
- Rain pants
- Redingote
- Robe
- Shawl
- Shirt
- Shrug
- Ski suit
- Sleeved blanket
- Sport coat
- Sunglasses
- Sweater
- Sweatshirt
- Top coat
- Touque
- Trench coat
- Windbreaker

== See also ==
- Fashion accessory, including outerwear items such as hats, gloves, and scarves
- Winter clothing
