= Ferrari 125 =

Ferrari used their 1.5 L Colombo 125 V12 engine in three models:

- 1947 Ferrari 125 C
- 1947 Ferrari 125 S
- 1948–1950 Ferrari 125 F1
