= Bruno Gavazzoli =

Italian racing driver

Bruno "Madero" Gavazzoli is a former Italian racing driver. He entered 25 races (22 started) between 1954 and 1960 in an O.S.C.A., a Maserati and two types of Ferraris. He scored one victory.

== Complete results ==
Year	Date	Race	Car	Teammate	Result
1954	May 2	Mille Miglia	Osca MT4	Bruno Franzoni	DNF
1954	July 4	Gran Premio Pietro Cidonio at the Circuito di Collemaggio	Osca MT4	-	DNF
1954	October 31	6 Hours of Castelfusano	Osca MT4	-	-
1955	March 19	Coppa Felice Bonetto	Osca MT4	-	3rd
1955	May 1	Mille Miglia	Osca MT4	Bruno Franzoni	80th
1955	May 8	Circuito di Gorizia	Osca MT4	-	DNF
1955	June 5	Mugello Grand Prix	Osca MT4	-	DNS
1955	June 26	Caserta Grand Prix	Osca MT4	-	6th
1955	October 16	XXXIX° Targa Florio	Maserati A6GCS	Gastone Crepaldi	19th
1956	April 29	Mille Miglia	Ferrari 500 Mondial	Gastone Crepaldi	DNS
1956	June 10	Opatija	Ferrari	-	5th
1956	June 24	IV° Supercortemaggiore Grand Prix	Ferrari 500 Mondial	Gerino Gerini; Silvio Rossi	DNF
1957	April 14	Giro di Sicilia	Ferrari 250 GT	Franco Cortese	-
1957	May 12	Mille Miglia	Ferrari 250 GT	-	DNF
1957	July 13	12 Hours of Reims	Ferrari 250 GT	Gino Munaron	3rd
1957	September 8	Coppa Inter-Europa	Ferrari 250 GT	-	-
1957	September 15-September 21	Tour de France Automobile (Nice-Le Mans-Vichy-Reims)	Ferrari 250 GT	Gino Munaron	DNS
1957	September 29	Pontedecimo-Giovi (hill climb)	Ferrari 250 GT	-	5th
1957	October 6	Trieste-Opicina hillclimb	Ferrari 250 GT TdF	-	5th
1958	April 7	3 Hours of Pau	Ferrari 250 GT	Gino Munaron	3rd
1958	June 8	Castell'Arquato-Vernasca (hill climb)	Ferrari 250 GT	-	-
1958	June 15	Varese-Campo di Fiori (hill climb)	Ferrari 250 GT	-	DNF
1958	November	IV° Venezuelan Grand Prix / Palmarejo-Caracas	Ferrari 250 GT	Gino Munaron	3rd
1958	-	Coppa Weiss-Marchall	Ferrari 250 GT	-	1st
1960	January 31	1000 Kilometers of Buenos Aires	Ferrari 250 GT	Nino Todaro; Gino Munaron	9th
