= Ferrari 159 S =

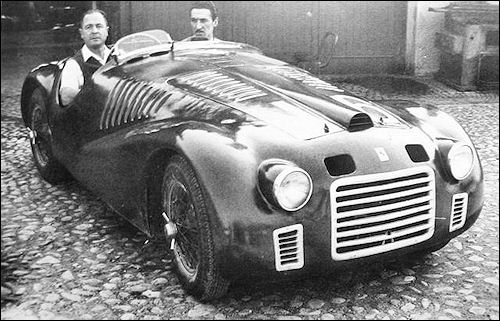
- One of the originals in 1947.

Overview
- Manufacturer: Ferrari
- Production: 1947; 2 produced
- Designer: Gioacchino Colombo

Body and chassis
- Class: Sports car
- Layout: FR layout

Powertrain
- Engine: 1.9 L (1902.84 cc) Colombo V12
- Transmission: 5-speed manual

Dimensions
- Wheelbase: 2,420 mm (95.3 in)
- Curb weight: 750 kg (1,653 lb)

Chronology
- Predecessor: Ferrari 125 S
- Successor: Ferrari 166 S

The Ferrari 159 S (1947) was the second Ferrari vehicle, succeeding the Ferrari 125 S that had won six of 14 races earlier in 1947. Only two 159 S were built, one of these rebuilt as a Ferrari 166 Spyder Corsa, and as of 2012, the oldest remaining Ferrari.

== Technical ==
The 159 S was essentially a Ferrari 125 S with a larger engine (larger bore) and very minor cosmetic differences.

The engine was a 1.9-litre (1903 cc/116 in³) 60° V12 with a bore/stroke of 59 x 58 mm, producing 125 bhp (92 kW) at 6,500 rpm with a compression ratio of 8.5:1. It was a single overhead camshaft design with 2 valves per cylinder and three Weber 32DCF carburettors. It had a five-speed manual transmissions and retained the Fiat tradition of mounting the engine in-block with the gearbox. It had a steel tube-frame chassis, independent wishbone suspension with transverse leaf springs in front and a live axle in the rear and hydraulic shock absorbers all round. Drum brakes were specified front and rear.

== Racing ==
The 159 S debuted for Scuderia Ferrari on August 15, 1947, at the Circuito di Pescara with the company's driver, Franco Cortese, coming in second. Although it led overall for a time, the class-winning 159 S eventually fell behind the Stanguellini of Vincenzo Auricchio. Like the 125, the 159 S was unable to beat Maserati's 6CS 1500 for much of the rest of the 1947 season. However, at the 1947 Turin Grand Prix on October 12, the car was able to shine, with French driver Raymond Sommer claiming overall victory in the single 159 S entered.

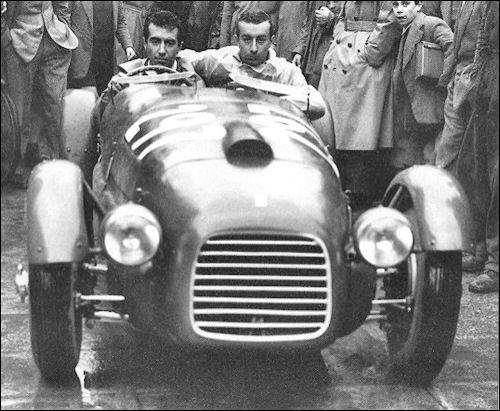
Gabriele and Soava Besana in the 159 S

It was sold to the Besana brothers of Milan, and converted into a 166 Spyder Corsa for the 1948 racing season.

Since an auction in 2004 the car has been owned and raced by Ferrari collector and restorer James Glickenhaus.
