= Franco Cortese =

Italian racing driver

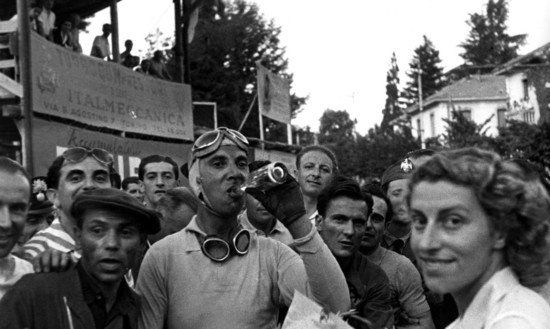
Cortese celebrates a victory in Varese on 29 June 1947

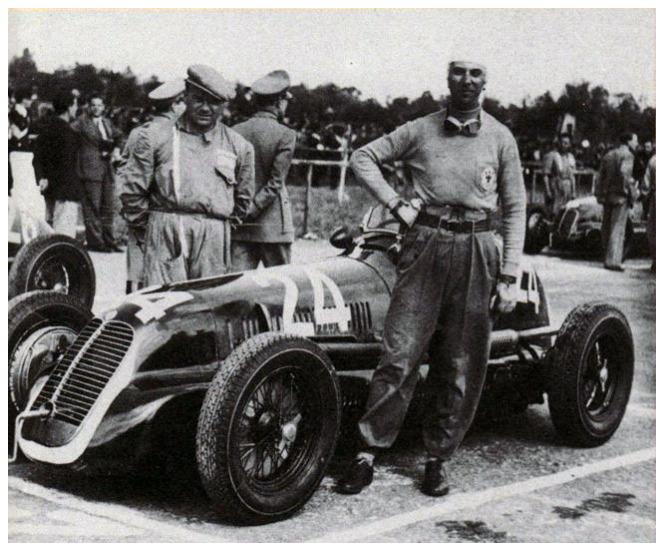
Cortese with Maserati 4CL at Targa Florio on 23 May 1940

Franco Cortese (10 February 1903 in Oggebbio, Piedmont – 13 November 1986 in Milan) was an Italian racing driver. He entered 156 races between 1927 and 1958, of which one was a Formula 1 Grand Prix and three were Formula 2 Grands Prix. Cortese holds the record of most finishes in a Mille Miglia race: fourteen.

Besides having entered many races in an Alfa Romeo, Cortese became most famous for his affiliation with Ferrari between 1947 and 1949, driving the first race car built by Ferrari in 1947, the Ferrari 125 S, which brought victories at four races in 1947. In 1950, he co-founded the Formula One team Scuderia Ambrosiana with Giovanni Lurani, Luigi Villoresi and Eugenio Minetti.

== Complete results ==
| No. | Year | Date | Race | Entrant | Car | Teammate(s) | Result |
|---|---|---|---|---|---|---|---|
| 1 | 1927 | 27 March | Mille Miglia | - | Itala 61 | M.Baroncini | 8th |
| 2 | 1928 | 1 April | Mille Miglia | - | Itala 61 | Cucchia | DNF |
| 3 | 1928 | 26 August | Coppa Ciano | - | Itala | - | 3rd |
| 4 | 1929 | 14 April | Mille Miglia | - | Alfa Romeo 6C 1750 SS | Angelo Guatta | 9th |
| 5 | 1930 | 13 April | Mille Miglia | - | Alfa Romeo 6C 1750GS | Pietro Ghersi | 4th |
| 6 | 1930 | 6 July | 24 Hours of Spa | - | Alfa Romeo 6C 1750GS | Boris Ivanowski | 2nd |
| 7 | 1931 | 12 April | Mille Miglia | - | Alfa Romeo 6C 1750GT | G. Balestrieri | 12th |
| 8 | 1932 | 8 May | XXIII° Targa Florio | Franco Cortese | Alfa Romeo 6C 1750 | none | DNS |
| 9 | 1932 | 10 April | Mille Miglia | - | Alfa Romeo 6C 1750 GTC | Attilio Marinoni | DNF |
| 10 | 1932 | 19 June | 1932 24 Hours of Le Mans | Automobili Alfa Romeo | Alfa Romeo 8C 2300 LM | Giovanni Battista Guidotti | 2nd |
| 11 | 1933 | 9 April | Mille Miglia | - | Alfa Romeo 8C 2300 Monza | Carlo Castelbarco | 2nd |
| 12 | 1933 | 18 June | 1933 24 Hours of Le Mans | Capt. G.E.T. Eyston | Alfa Romeo 8C 2300 Mille Miglia | Louis Chiron; Tazio Nuvolari | DNF |
| 13 | 1933 | 30 July | VII° Coppa Ciano | Franco Cortese | Alfa Romeo 8C 2300 Monza | none | 7th |
| 14 | 1934 | 13–14 August | Targa Abruzzo | - | Alfa Romeo 6C 2300A | Francesco Severi | 1st |
| 15 | 1935 | 14 April | Mille Miglia | Scuderia Ferrari | Alfa Romeo 6C 2300 Pescara | Francesco Severi | 8th |
| 16 | 1935 | 11–12 August | Targa Abruzzo | - | Alfa Romeo 6C 2300A | Francesco Severi | 1st |
| 17 | 1936 | 5 April | Mille Miglia | - | Alfa Romeo 8C 2300 | Giuseppe Salvi der Pero | DNF |
| 18 | 1936 | 10 May | X° Gran Premio di Tripoli | Franco Cortese | Alfa Romeo Tipo B a.k.a. Alfa Romeo P3 (Monoposto) | none | DNF |
| 19 | 1937 | 4 April | Mille Miglia | - | Alfa Romeo 6C 2300 Pescara | Angelo Guatta | 6th |
| 20 | 1937 | 18 April | II° Gran Premio del Valentino | Scuderia Ambrosiana | Maserati 6CM | none | DNF |
| 21 | 1937 | 25 April | III° Coppa Principessa di Piemonte | Officine Alfieri Maserati | Maserati 6CM | none | DNF |
| 22 | 1937 | 9 May | XI° Gran Premio di Tripoli | Scuderia Ambrosiana | Maserati 6CM | none | 16th |
| 23 | 1937 | 16 May | Tunis Grand Prix | - | Alfa Romeo 6C 2300 Pescara | - | 7th |
| 24 | 1937 | 30 May | VI Internationales AVUS Rennen | - | Maserati 6CM | - | DNF |
| 25 | 1937 | 6 June | 3 Hours of Marseille | Franco Cortese | Alfa Romeo 6C 2300 Pescara | none | - |
| 26 | 1937 | 13 June | Gran Premio di Firenze | Scuderia Maremmana | Maserati 6CM | Francesco Severi; Ferdinando Barbieri | 4th |
| 27 | 1937 | 13 June | XI ADAC Eifelrennen | Scuderia Maremmana | Maserati 6CM | Francesco Severi | 3rd |
| 28 | 1937 | 20 June | II° Circuito di Milano | Scuderia Maremmana | Maserati 6CM | Francesco Severi | 3rd |
| 29 | 1937 | 18 July | Susa-Moncenisio (hillclimb) | - | Alfa Romeo 6C 2300B | - | - |
| 30 | 1937 | 25 July | X Großer Preis von Deutschland | Scuderia Maremmana | Maserati 6CM | Francesco Severi; Renato Balestrero | DNF |
| 31 | 1937 | 13 August | Targa Abruzzo | - | Alfa Romeo 6C 2300B | - | 1st |
| 32 | 1937 | 15 August | XIII° Coppa Acerbo | - | Maserati 6CM | - | 3rd |
| 33 | 1937 | 22 August | IV Grand Prix de Berne | Scuderia Ambrosiana | Maserati 6CM | none | 4th |
| 34 | 1937 | 19 September | III° Coppa Ciano | - | Maserati 6CM | - | DNF |
| 35 | 1937 | 26 September | Circuit of Campione d'Italia | Scuderia Torino | Maserati | none | DNS |
| 36 | 1937 | - | XII° Gran Premio di Tripoli | Scuderia Ambrosiana | Maserati 6CM | Luigi Villoresi | 2nd |
| 37 | 1938 | 3 April | Mille Miglia | - | Alfa Romeo 6C 2300B MM | C. Fumagalli | 9th |
| 38 | 1938 | 24 April | Coppa dei Colli Torinesi (hillclimb) | - | Alfa Romeo 6C 2300B | - | - |
| 39 | 1938 | 15 May | XII° Gran Premio di Tripoli | Scuderia Ambrosiana | Maserati 6CM | Giovanni Lurani; Luigi Villoresi; Manuel de Teffé; Ferdinando Righetti | DNF |
| 40 | 1938 | 22 May | XXIX° Targa Florio | Scuderia Ambrosiana | Maserati 6CM | Manuel de Teffé; Ferdinando Righetti; Luigi Villoresi | DNS |
| 41 | 1938 | 29 May | Parma-Poggio di Berceto | - | Alfa Romeo 6C 2300B | - | - |
| 42 | 1938 | 19 June | Coppa Ascoli | - | Alfa Romeo 6C 2300B | - | 2nd |
| 43 | 1938 | 3 July | Trofeo Val d'Intelvi (hillclimb) | - | Alfa Romeo 6C 2300B | - | 1st |
| 44 | 1938 | 10 July | Pontedecimo-Giovi (hillclimb) | - | Alfa Romeo 6C 2300B | - | - |
| 45 | 1938 | 17 July | Circuito Varese | Officine Alfieri Maserati | Maserati 6CM | Aldo Marazza; Giovanni Rocco | 1st |
| 46 | 1938 | 24 July | XI Großer Preis von Deutschland | Scuderia Ambrosiana | Maserati 6CM | none | 9th |
| 47 | 1938 | 7 August | Coppa Ciano | Scuderia Ambrosiana | Maserati 6CM | none | 4th |
| 48 | 1938 | 15 August | Targa Abruzzo | - | Alfa Romeo 6C 2300B | Pietro Ghersi | 1st |
| 49 | 1938 | 3 September | Tourist Trophy | - | Alfa Romeo | - | DNS |
| 50 | 1938 | 4 September | IV° Coppa Ciano | Scuderia Ambrosiana | Maserati 6CM | Luigi Villoresi | 2nd |
| 51 | 1938 | 11 September | Gran Premio di Milano | Officine Alfieri Maserati | Maserati 6CM | Aldo Marazza; Luigi Villoresi; Paul Pietsch | 4th |
| 52 | 1938 | 18 September | Circuito di Modena | Officine Alfieri Maserati | Maserati 6CM | none | 1st |
| 53 | 1939 | 2 January | V South African Grand Prix | Officine Alfieri Maserati | Maserati 6CM | Luigi Villoresi; Piero Taruffi | 2nd |
| 54 | 1939 | 14 January | III Grosvenor Grand Prix | Officine Alfieri Maserati | Maserati 6CM | Luigi Villoresi; Piero Taruffi | 1st |
| 55 | 1939 | 7 May | XIII° Gran Premio di Tripoli | Officine Alfieri Maserati | Maserati 6CM | Carlo Felice Trossi; Luigi Villoresi | DNF |
| 56 | 1939 | 14 May | XXX° Targa Florio | Officine Alfieri Maserati | Maserati 6CM | Luigi Villoresi | DNF |
| 57 | 1939 | 28 May | V° Coppa Principessa di Piemonte | Officine Alfieri Maserati | Maserati 4CL | Giovanni Rocco; Luigi Villoresi; Luigi Belucci; Carlo Felice Trossi | 3rd |
| 58 | 1939 | 11 June | Circuito dell'Impero | Scuderia Ambrosiana | Alfa Romeo | none | 3rd |
| 59 | 1939 | 9 July | I Circuito del Carnaro | Officine Alfieri Maserati | Maserati 4CL | Luigi Villoresi; Giovanni Rocco | 2nd |
| 60 | 1939 | 30 July | XIX Coppa Ciano | Officine Alfieri Maserati | Maserati 4CL | Luigi Villoresi; Giovanni Rocco; Carlo Felice Trossi | 2nd |
| 61 | 1939 | 13 August | XV° Coppa Acerbo | Officine Alfieri Maserati | Maserati 4CL | Luigi Villoresi; Giovanni Rocco; Carlo Felice Trossi | 2nd |
| 62 | 1940 | 28 April | Mille Miglia | - | BMW 328 | Giovanni Lurani | DNF |
| 63 | 1940 | 12 May | XIV° Gran Premio di Tripoli | Officine Alfieri Maserati | Maserati 4CL | Luigi Villoresi | 5th |
| 64 | 1940 | 23 May | XXXI° Targa Florio | Officine Alfieri Maserati | Maserati 4CL | Luigi Villoresi | 2nd |
| 65 | 1946 | 23 June | Circuito di Campione d'Italia | - | - | - | - |
| 66 | 1946 | 30 June | Modena (handicap) | Scuderia Ambrosiana | Lancia Astura | none | 1st |
| 67 | 1946 | 30 June | Modena (S+1.5) | Scuderia Ambrosiana | Lancia Astura | none | 1st |
| 68 | 1946 | 4 August | Circuito di Luino | - | Lancia Astura | - | 1st |
| 69 | 1947 | 11 May | Piacenza | Scuderia Ferrari | Ferrari 125 Spyder | none | DNF |
| 70 | 1947 | 25 May | Rome Grand Prix | Scuderia Ferrari | Ferrari 125 Spyder | none | 1st |
| 71 | 1947 | 1 June | Vercelli | Scuderia Ferrari | Ferrari 125 Spyder | none | 1st |
| 72 | 1947 | 15 June | Vigevano | Scuderia Ferrari | Ferrari 125 Spyder Corsa | Adelmo Marchetti | DNF |
| 73 | 1947 | 29 June | Varese | Scuderia Ferrari | Ferrari 125 Spyder Corsa | none | 1st |
| 74 | 1947 | 13 July | Parma | Scuderia Ferrari | Ferrari 125 Spyder | none | 2nd |
| 75 | 1947 | 20 July | Florence | Scuderia Ferrari | Ferrari 125 Spyder Corsa | none | DNF |
| 76 | 1947 | 15 August | Circuito di Pescara | Scuderia Ferrari | Ferrari 159 Spyder | none | 2nd |
| 77 | 1947 | 24 August | Livorno | - | Ferrari 125 Spyder | - | DNS |
| 78 | 1947 | 28 September | Modena | Scuderia Ferrari | Ferrari 159 C | none | DNF |
| 79 | 1947 | - | Sehab Almaz Bey Trophy | - | Cisitalia D46 | - | 1st |
| 80 | 1948 | 4 April | Targa Florio | - | Ferrari 125 S | Ferdinando Righetti | DNF |
| 81 | 1948 | 2 May | Mille Miglia | Scuderia Ferrari | Ferrari 166 S | Adelmo Marchetti | DNF |
| 82 | 1948 | 11 July | 24 Hours of Spa | Scuderia Ambrosiana | Fiat 1100 S | Diego Capelli | DNF |
| 83 | 1948 | 1 August | Aosta-Gran San Bernando | - | Ferrari 166 SC | - | 5th |
| 84 | 1948 | 15 August | Circuito di Pescara | Scuderia Ferrari | Ferrari 166 S | none | 5th |
| 85 | 1949 | 20 March | Targa Florio | Scuderia Ferrari | Ferrari 166 MM | none | DNF |
| 86 | 1949 | 24 April | Mille Miglia | Gabriele Besana | Ferrari 166 SC | Gabriele Besana | DNF |
| 87 | 1949 | 2 June | X Formula 2 Gran Premio di Roma | Scuderia Ferrari | Ferrari 166 SC | Luigi Villoresi; Piero Taruffi | 3rd |
| 88 | 1949 | 31 July | Coppa della Toscana | - | Bristol | Giovanni Lurani | 8th |
| 89 | 1949 | - | II Formula 2 Gran Premio dell'Autodromo di Monza | - | Ferrari 166 F2 | - | 5th |
| 90 | 1950 | 2 April | Targa Florio | Conte Giovanni Lurani | Frazer Nash Le Mans Replica | Carlo Facetti | 19th |
| 91 | 1950 | 23 April | Mille Miglia | Conte Giovanni Lurani | Frazer Nash Le Mans Replica | Z. Teravazzi | 6th |
| 92 | 1950 | 4 June | Coppa della Toscana | - | Abarth 1100 | Luigi Maggio | 10th |
| 93 | 1950 | 11 June | 3 Hours of Rome | - | Cisitalia | - | 3rd |
| 94 | 1950 | 9 July | IV Formula 1 Gran Premio di Bari | Franco Cortese | Ferrari 166 S | none | 5th |
| 95 | 1950 | 8 October | Modena | - | Stanugellini S1100 | - | 5th |
| 96 | 1951 | 1 April | Giro di Sicilia | Conte Giovanni Lurani | Frazer Nash Le Mans Replica | L. Tagni | 4th |
| 97 | 1951 | 1 April | Mille Miglia | Conte Giovanni Lurani | Frazer Nash Le Mans Replica | L. Tagni | 9th |
| 98 | 1951 | 13 May | IV Formula 2 Gran Premio dell'Autodromo di Monza | Scuderia Ambrosiana | Ferrari 166 F2 | none | DNF |
| 99 | 1951 | 3 June | Eifelrennen Nürburgring | - | Frazer Nash | - | DNS |
| 100 | 1951 | 5 August | Schauinsland (hillclimb) | Scuderia Ambrosiana | Frazer Nash | none | 5th |
| 101 | 1951 | 19 August | Pergusa Grand Prix | - | Frazer Nash Le Mans Replica | - | 1st |
| 102 | 1951 | 9 September | Targa Florio | Scuderia Ambrosiana | Frazer Nash Le Mans Replica | none | 1st |
| 103 | 1952 | 9 March | Giro di Sicilia | - | Alfa Romeo 1900 | Giulio Sala | 9th |
| 104 | 1952 | 4 May | Mille Miglia | - | Alfa Romeo 1900 Sprint | A. de Giuseppe | DNF |
| 105 | 1952 | 15 June | 1952 24 Hours of Le Mans | Alfa Romeo | Alfa Romeo 6C 3000 CM | Juan Manuel Fangio; Froilan Gonzalez | DNS |
| 106 | 1952 | 22 June | Circuito di Caserta | - | Frazer Nash | - | 2nd |
| 107 | 1952 | 29 June | Targa Florio | Conte Giovanni Lurani | Frazer Nash Le Mans Replica | none | DNF |
| 108 | 1953 | 12 April | Giro di Sicilia | - | Alfa Romeo 1900 TI | - | DNF |
| 109 | 1953 | 26 April | Mille Miglia | - | Fiat 8V | P. Feroldi | 14th |
| 110 | 1953 | 26 April | Mille Miglia | Mario Tadini | Jaguar C-Type | Mario Tadini; Pietro Cagnana | DNS |
| 111 | 1953 | 14 May | Targa Florio | Automobiles Frazer Nash | Frazer Nash Le Mans Replica | none | DNF |
| 112 | 1953 | 26 July | 10 Hours of Messina | - | Ferrari 250 MM | Bruno Sterzi | 8th |
| 113 | 1953 | 9 August | Circuito di Senigallia | - | Ferrari 166 MM/53 | - | 1st |
| 114 | 1953 | 15 August | 12 Hours of Pescara | Enrico Sterzi | Ferrari 166 MM/53 | Enrico Sterzi | 3rd |
| 115 | 1953 | 23 August | Trullo d'Oro | - | Ferrari | - | 2nd |
| 116 | 1953 | 9 September | I Gran Premio Supercortemaggiore | - | Ferrari 166 MM/53 | - | DNF |
| 117 | 1954 | 4 April | Giro di Sicilia | - | Ferrari 500 Mondial | - | DNF |
| 118 | 1954 | 11 April | Coppa della Toscana | - | Ferrari | E. Perucchini | 19th |
| 119 | 1954 | 2 May | Mille Miglia | - | Ferrari 500 Mondial | E. Perucchini | 14th |
| 120 | 1954 | 16 May | VII Gran Premio di Napoli | - | Ferrari | - | DNF |
| 121 | 1954 | 22 May | 3 Hours of Bari | - | Ferrari 500 Mondial | - | 3rd |
| 122 | 1954 | 30 May | Targa Florio | - | Ferrari 166 MM/53 | - | DNF |
| 123 | 1954 | 13 June | Circuito di Caserta | - | Ferrari 166 MM/53 | - | 3rd |
| 124 | 1954 | 20 June | Gran Premio d'Imola | - | Ferrari 166 MM/53 | - | 8th |
| 125 | 1954 | 4 July | Cidonio Grand Prix a.k.a. Circuito di Collemaggio in L'Aquila | - | Ferrari 166 MM/53 | - | 2nd |
| 126 | 1954 | 25 July | 10 Hours of Messina | - | Ferrari 166 MM/53 | Giulio Musitelli | 6th |
| 127 | 1954 | 8 August | Circuito di Senigallia | - | Ferrari | - | 5th |
| 128 | 1955 | 1 May | Mille Miglia | - | Fiat 8V | Achille Stazzi; R. Pasqualino | 46th |
| 129 | 1955 | 29 May | Supercortemaggiore | - | Ferrari 500 Mondial | Luigi Piotti | 5th |
| 130 | 1955 | 27 August | Oulton Park International | Franco Cortese | Ferrari 500 Mondial | none | DNF |
| 131 | 1955 | 16 October | Targa Florio | - | Ferrari 500 Mondial | Antonio Pucci | DNF |
| 132 | 1956 | 29 April | Mille Miglia | - | Fiat 8V | - | 97th |
| 133 | 1956 | 10 June | Opatija | Franco Cortese | Ferrari 500 TR | none | 1st |
| 134 | 1956 | 10 June | Targa Florio | - | - | - | - |
| 135 | 1956 | 17 June | Circuito di Caserta | Franco Cortese | Ferrari 500 TR | none | 1st |
| 136 | 1956 | 24 June | IV Gran Premio Supercortemaggiore | Franco Cortese | Ferrari 500 TR | Enzo Pinzero | 11th |
| 137 | 1956 | 15 July | Circuito di Reggio Calabria (Handicap) | Franco Cortese | Ferrari 500 TR | none | DNS |
| 138 | 1956 | 15 July | Circuito di Reggio Calabria (S2.0) | Franco Cortese | Ferrari 500 TR | none | 2nd |
| 139 | 1956 | 22 July | Bari Grand Prix | Franco Cortese | Ferrari 500 TR | none | 6th |
| 140 | 1956 | 29 July | Giro delle Calabria | Franco Cortese | Ferrari 500 TR | none | 7th |
| 141 | 1956 | 18 August | Pescara Grand Prix | Franco Cortese | Ferrari 500 TR | none | 4th |
| 142 | 1956 | 26 August | 5 Hours of Messina | Franco Cortese | Ferrari 500 TR | none | 4th |
| 143 | 1956 | 30 September | Circuito di Sassari | Franco Cortese | Ferrari 500 TR | none | 1st |
| 144 | 1956 | 21 October | Rome Grand Prix | Franco Cortese | Ferrari 500 TR | none | 6th |
| 145 | 1956 | 4 November | II Gran Premio Internacional de Venezuela | Franco Cortese | Ferrari 500 TR | none | 11th |
| 146 | 1957 | 14 April | Giro di Sicilia | Wolfgang Seidel | Ferrari 250 GT | Bruno Gavazzoli | - |
| 147 | 1957 | 9 June | Monsanto | - | Ferrari 500 TR | - | 9th |
| 148 | 1957 | 11 August | Sverige Grand Prix | Adrian Conan Doyle | Ferrari 500 TRC | Adrian Conan Doyle | DNS |
| 149 | 1957 | 1 December | Esso Vallelunga | - | Ferrari 500 TR | - | 15th |
| 150 | 1958 | 13 April | Coppa Shell Monza | Franco Cortese | Ferrari 500 TR | none | 5th |
| 151 | 1958 | 27 April | XI Gran Premio di Napoli | - | Ferrari 500 TR | - | 6th |
| 152 | 1958 | 11 May | Targa Florio | - | Ferrari 500 TRC | Gaetano Starrabba | 7th |
| 153 | 1958 | 15 May | Aspern | Franco Cortese | Ferrari 500 TRC | none | 2nd |
| 154 | 1958 | 6 July | Circuito di Sassari | - | Ferrari 500 TR | - | 4th |
| 155 | 1958 | 20 July | 10 Hours of Messina | - | Ferrari 500 TRC | Gaetano Starrabba | - |
| 156 | 1958 | 5 October | Innsbruck | Franco Cortese | Ferrari | none | 7th |
