= Angelo Guatta =

Italian racing driver

Angelo Guatta (August 5, 1907 – October 9, 1993, New Jersey) was an Italian racing driver. Besides racing the 1932 24 Hours of Le Mans and the Circuito del Sud in 1930, Guatta entered the Mille Miglia seven times between 1928 and 1938. In all his races he used an Alfa Romeo 6C or 8C.

== Complete results ==
Year	Date	Race	Car	Teammate	Result
1928	April 1	Mille Miglia	Alfa Romeo 6C 1500 Sport	"A.Bornigia"	5th
1929	April 14	Mille Miglia	Alfa Romeo 6C 1750 SS	Franco Cortese	9th
1930	April 13	Mille Miglia	Alfa Romeo 6C 1500 SS	"F. Pirola"	13th
1930	September 28	Circuito del Sud	Alfa Romeo	Guido d'Ippolito	3rd
1931	April 12	Mille Miglia	Alfa Romeo 6C 1750 GT	Carlo Gazzabini	8th
1932	June 19	1932 24 Hours of Le Mans	Alfa Romeo 8C 2300 LM	Attilio Marinoni; Prince Djordjadze; Goffredo Zehender	DNF
1935	April 14	Mille Miglia	Alfa Romeo 8C 2300 Monza	Hans Ruesch	4th
1937	April 4	Mille Miglia	Alfa Romeo 2300B Pescara	Franco Cortese	6th
1938	April 3	Mille Miglia	Alfa Romeo 2300B Mille Miglia	Giovanni Battaglia	DNF
