= Giovanni Battaglia =

Italian racing driver

Giovanni "Gianni" Battaglia (August 9, 1893 – March 28, 1949), born in Luino, was an Italian racing driver. He drove 12 races between 1931 and 1938, all in an Alfa Romeo, including five times the Mille Miglia.

== Complete results ==
Year	Date	Race	Car	Teammate(s)	Result
1931	October 4	Coppa della Consuma	Alfa Romeo 6C 1750 Gran Sport	-	4th
1932	April 10	Mille Miglia	Alfa Romeo 6C 1750 Gran Sport	Ferruccio Bianchi	15th
1932	August 15	Targa Abruzzo	Alfa Romeo 6C 1750 Gran Sport	-	3rd
1933	April 9	Mille Miglia	Alfa Romeo 8C 2300	Ferruccio Bianchi	4th
1933	May 7	Tripoli Grand Prix	Alfa Romeo 8C 2300 Monza	none	4th
1934	April 8	Mille Miglia	Alfa Romeo 8C 2300 Monza	Ferruccio Bianchi	4th
1934	May 6	Tripoli Grand Prix	Alfa Romeo 8C 2300 Monza	none	DNF
1935	April 14	Mille Miglia	Alfa Romeo 8C 2300 Monza	Giuseppe Tuffanelli	3rd
1936	May 10	1936 Tripoli Grand Prix	Alfa Romeo P3/Tipo B	-	10th
1936	September 6	II Coppa Edda Ciano	Alfa Romeo 8C 2300 Monza	-	3rd
1936	September 21	V Circuito di Modena	Alfa Romeo P3/Tipo B	-	6th
1938	April 3	Mille Miglia	Alfa Romeo 6C 2300 B Mille Miglia	Angelo Guatta	DNF
