= Ferruccio Bianchi =

Italian racing driver

Ferruccio Bianchi was an Italian racing driver, whose career consisted of three Mille Miglia entries.

== Results ==
Year	Date	Race	Car	Teammate	Result (Time)
1932	10 April	Mille Miglia	Alfa Romeo 6C 1750 Gran Sport	Giovanni Battaglia	15th (18:00:45.0)
1933	9 April	Mille Miglia	Alfa Romeo 8C 2300 Monza	Giovanni Battaglia	4th (16:19:40.4)
1934	8 April	Mille Miglia	Alfa Romeo 8C 2600	Giovanni Battaglia	4th (15:29:34.0)
