= Ferrari 125 C =

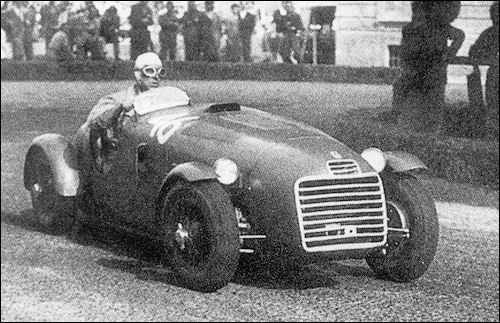
Entry # 46 at Circuito Vigevano on 15 June 1947 was Franco Cortese driving the 1947 Ferrari 125 S s / n 02C to a 3rd place overall.

The Ferrari 125 C is an open-wheel single-seater racing car, designed, developed, and produced by Ferrari in 1947 as a single example. It competed primarily in Formula Libre contests and events.

== History ==
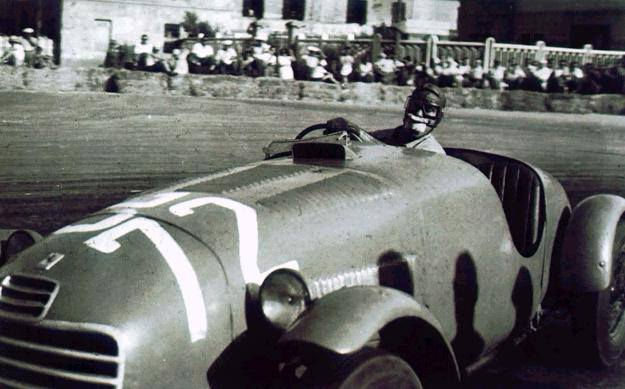
Tazio Nuvolari in the Ferrari 125 C

The model originated from the 125 S, which was built by Ferrari in two examples in the same year of production as the "125 C". Compared to the ancestor car, the engine and gearbox were slightly modified. The most important changes, however, were made to the bodywork. The latter was in fact built in such a way as to have the possibility of removing the mudguards and the lights, with the relative electrical system, which made the model suitable for participating in competitions in the single-seater category. During the races, it was also possible to place a cover that covered the passenger seat. The model was equipped with a light and resistant frame.

The numerical abbreviation in the model name was linked to the characteristics of the engine; more precisely, it referred to the unit displacement, ie that relating to a single cylinder, which was approximately 125 cm³. The letter C instead meant Race or Competition.

== Competitions ==
The two most important victories of the model, both achieved in 1947, were at the Rome Grand Prix with Franco Cortese at the helm, and at the Arcangeli Cup with Tazio Nuvolari.

== Technical design ==
The engine was a front and longitudinal 60° V12. The bore and stroke were 55 mm and 52.5 mm respectively, which brought the total displacement to 1496.77 cm³. The compression ratio was 9.5:1. The maximum power produced by the engine was 118 hp at 6800 rpm.

The distribution consisted of a single overhead camshaft that controlled two valves per cylinder. The fuel system was supplied by three Weber brand carburetors and model 30 DCF. The ignition was single and the related system included two magnets. The lubrication was wet-sump, while the clutch was a single plate.

The front suspensions were independent, with cross wishbones and leaf springs mounted in the same way, while the rear ones consisted of a rigid bridge, longitudinal semi-elliptical leaf springs, and stabilizer bar. Both had mounted hydraulic shock absorbers. The brakes were drum brakes, while the transmission consisted of a five-speed gearbox plus reverse. The steering was a worm screw and toothed sector.

The chassis was tubular in steel, while the body was a two-seater spider with uncovered wheels.

The maximum speed achieved by the model was 210 km/h (130 mph).
