= Giovanni Lurani =

Italian automobile engineer and racecar driver

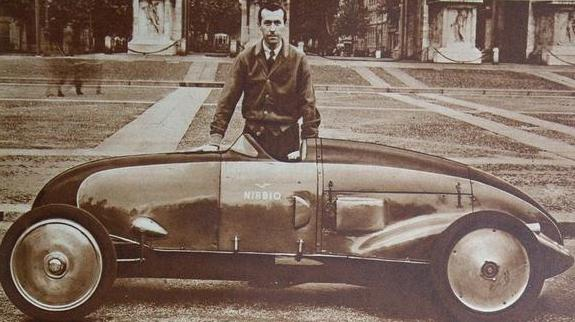
Lurani with "Nibbio 1" in 1935

Giovanni “Johnny” Lurani Cernuschi, VIII Count of Calvenzano (December 19, 1905 – January 17, 1995) was an Italian automobile engineer, racing car driver and journalist.

Lurani studied engineering at the Politecnico di Milano and raced cars such as Salmson, Derby, Alfa Romeo and Maserati, participating eleven times in the Mille Miglia. He took class wins in the event three times: 1933 in an MG K3, 1948 in a Healey and 1952 in a Porsche.

After partaking in the second Italo-Abyssinian War from 1935 to 1936, Lurani founded the racing team Scuderia Ambrosiana in 1937 along with Luigi Villoresi and Franco Cortese (1937). Sustaining a bad hip injury in a Maserati 4CM at Crystal Palace, Lurani ended his single-seater career in 1938 but continued racing sportscars until 1953.

After World War II Lurani became more involved in administration and politics, working with the FIA, where he initiated GT in 1949 and Formula Junior in 1959 and was one of the principal organizers of FIA-sanctioned events at Monza, including the Italian Grand Prix there.

He also designed record breaking cars based on Moto Guzzi engines. In 1935 the Nibbio 1 was the first 500cc car to exceed 100 mph. The 350cc Moto Guzzi powered Nibbio 2 broke long-distance records at Monza in 1956. He was president of the FIM (Fédération Internationale de Motocyclisme) Sporting Commission for several years.

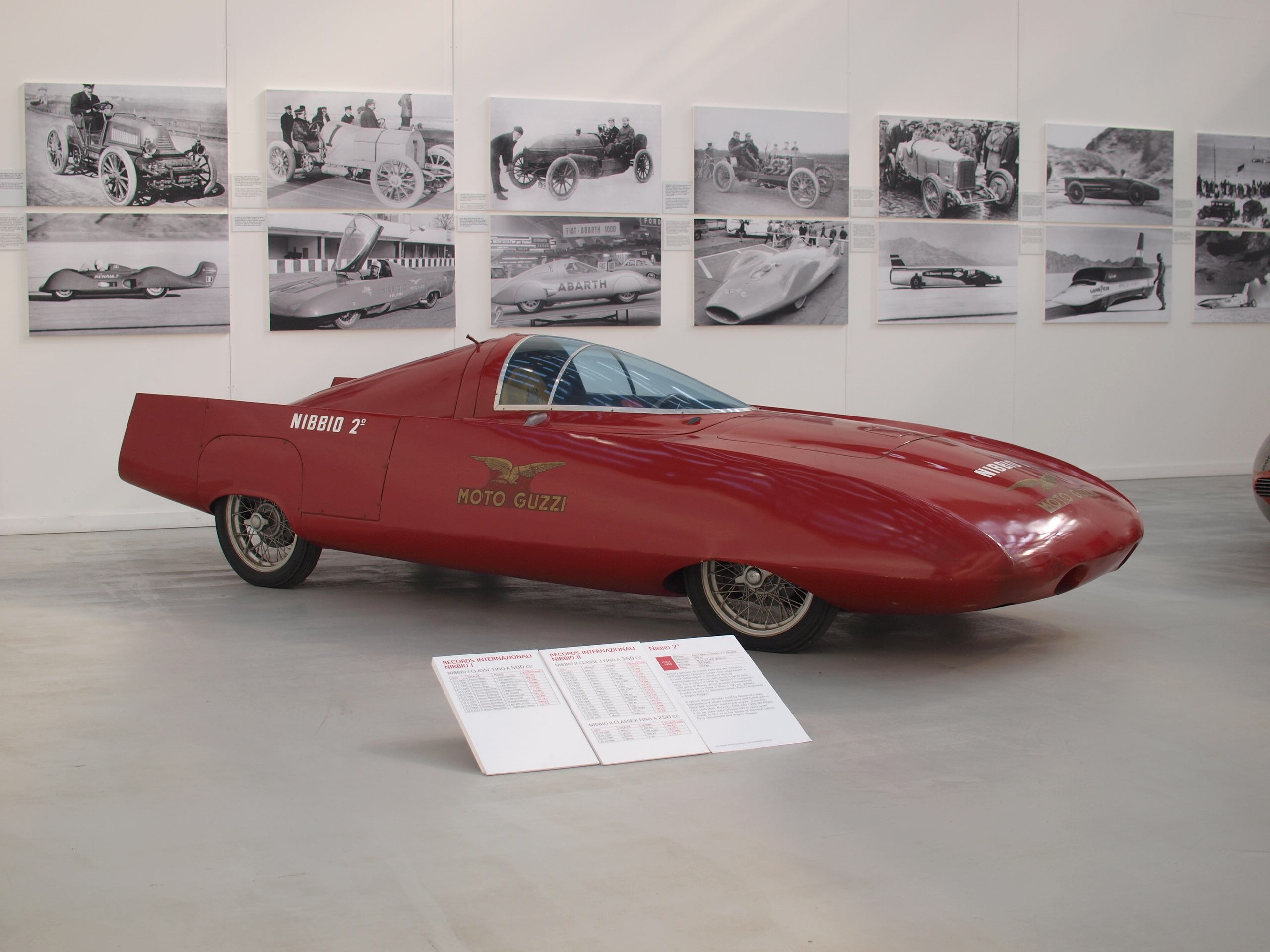
Moto Guzzi Nibbio 2 in the Museo Nazionale Dell'Automobile, Turin

In 1971 he won the prestigious Premio Bancarella Sport literary prize for his book Storia delle Macchine da Corsa (History of Race Cars)

== Publications ==
- Auto Italiana, which he founded and edited
- Nuvolari (Cassell & Company Ltd., 1959). With Luigi Marinatto.
- La storia delle macchine da corsa (1970). Translation History of the racing car: Man and machine (1972)
- La storia della Mille Miglia 1927-57 (1979).
- Alfa Romeo: Catalogo ragionato (1982). With Paolo Altieri.
- Racing around the world 1920-35.
- NUVOLARI. Legendary Champion of International Auto Racing. (1959) Sports Car Press

== Racing record ==
=== Complete European Championship results ===
(key) (Races in bold indicate pole position) (Races in italics indicate fastest lap)

Year	Entrant	Chassis	Engine	1	2	3	EDC	Pts
1931	F. Pirola	Alfa Romeo 6C-1500	Alfa Romeo 1.5 L6	ITA; 6	FRA	BEL	13th	20

=== 24 Hours of Le Mans results ===
Year	Team	Co-Drivers	Car	Class	Laps	Pos.	Class Pos.
1951	(Italy) Scuderia Ambrosiana	(Italy) Giovanni Bracco	Lancia Aurelia B20 GT	S 2.0	235	12th	**1st**
1953	(France) Ets Fiat Dagrada	(France) Norbert Jean Mahé	Fiat 8V	S 2.0	8	DNF	DNF
