= OSCA MT4 =

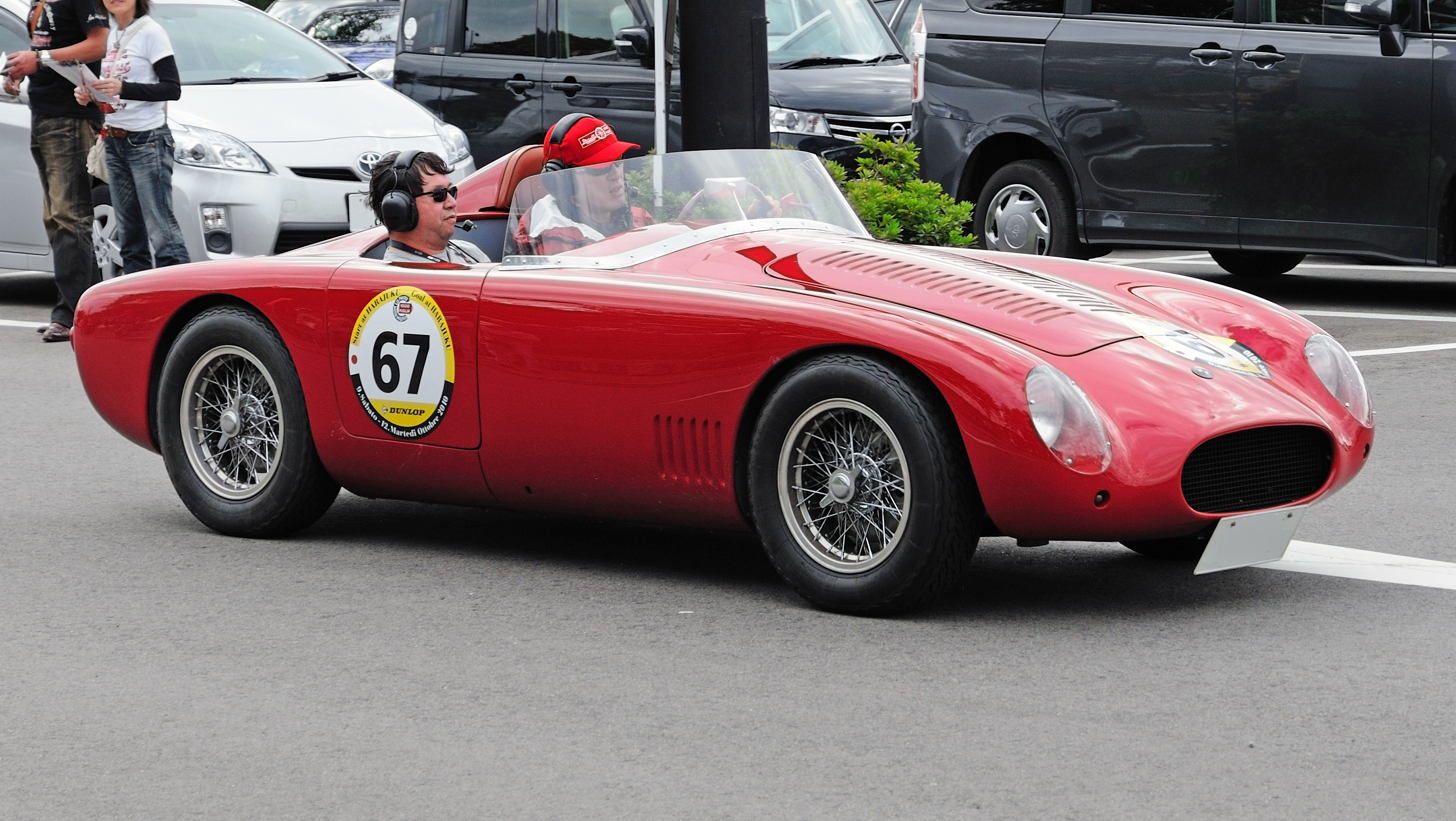
- 1955 OSCA MT4

Overview
- Manufacturer: O.S.C.A.
- Also called: OSCA 1500 TN
- Production: 1948–1956 (72-79 produced)
- Assembly: Bologna, Italy

Body and chassis
- Layout: FR layout

Powertrain
- Engine: 1089 cc Fiat OHV I4; 1092 cc MT4 SOHC I4; 1092 cc MT4-2AD DOHC I4; 1342 cc MT4 SOHC I4; 1342 cc MT4-2AD DOHC I4; 1453 cc MT4-2AD DOHC I4; 1492 cc 1500TN DOHC I4
- Transmission: 4-speed manual

Dimensions
- Wheelbase: 2,200 mm (86.6 in)
- Kerb weight: approximately 600 kg (1,300 lb)

Chronology
- Successor: OSCA FS 372

The OSCA MT4, also spelled the O.S.C.A. MT4 or Osca MT4, is an Italian sports car prototype, designed, developed, and made by Officine Specializzata Costruzioni Automobili, between 1948 and 1956, but was raced and used in active competition until 1966.

Due to the variety of engines of different displacement sizes and the comparatively large number of chassis built (thanks to strong sales), the OSCA MT4 had an unusually long service life for a competition car. Between 1948 and 1966, it notched 92 wins, 109 class wins, 9 pole positions, and 194 podiums - an impressive record for a small manufacturer without the means of sustaining a factory competition effort.

== The foundation of OSCA ==
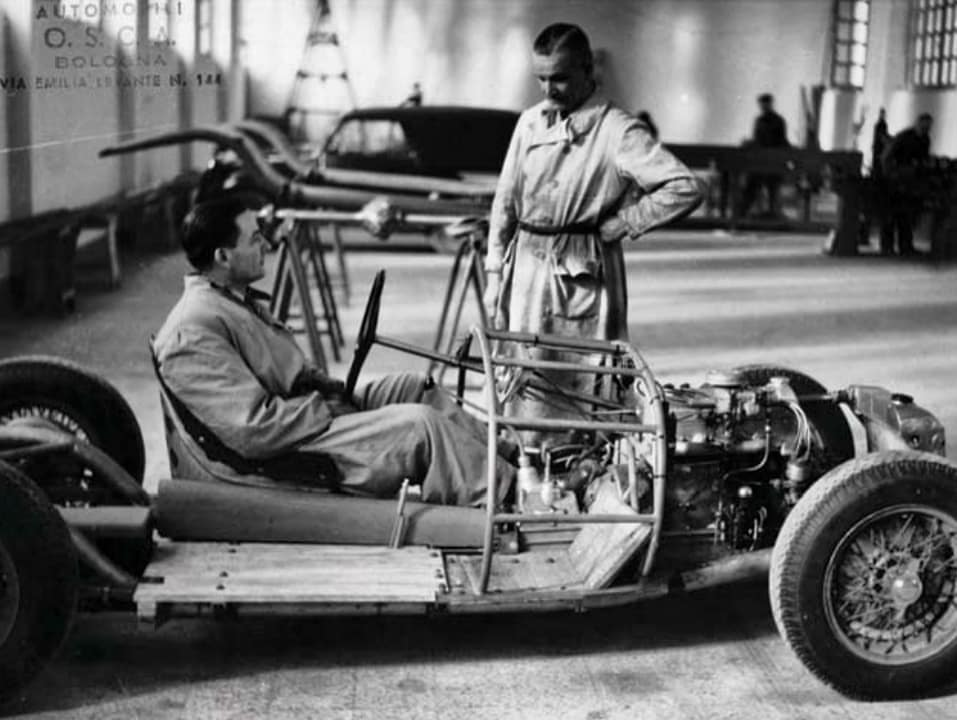
Ernesto (seated) and Bindo Maserati in an early MT4 chassis in April 1948.

In 1937, five years after Alfieri's death, Ettore and Ernesto Maserati were forced to sell Maserati after financial turmoil. However, the contract with the new Maserati owner Adolfo Orsi meant that the brothers had to remain with their former company for a ten-year term. In 1947 they were finally free to go their own way; Officine Specializzata Costruzioni Automobili Fratelli Maserati was founded and the first vehicle type, the MT4, was built. In its original form, the chassis and engine were based on the Maserati Tipo 4CL single-seater racing car, first built in 1939. Development of the MT4 began immediately, using plans and parts from the Maserati 4CL. In all, OSCA built 77 chassis between 1949 and 1956 (some sources state 72, some 78).

== Design ==
OSCA's first automobile was the MT4, for Maserati Tipo 4 cilindri. The initial cars used a Fiat 1100 block and the engine developed 55 hp (40 kW). OSCA soon developed a new 1,092 cc engine, which produced 72 PS (53 kW; 71 hp) at 6,000 rpm, had a in-house designed aluminium block and alloy head. Some sources state that 9 cars were built with 1.1-liter engines. Originally a single-cam design, in 1950 this was changed to a twin-cam unit, indicated by using the name MT4-2AD, with "2AD" signifying 2 Alberi di Distribuzione (twin camshafts). The 2AD was originally available as an 1100 or a 1350. The bore and stroke changed over the years and to allow competing in various classes, meaning that the displacement of the engines increased from 1092 cc via 1342 cc and then 1453 cc until finally reaching 1492 cc. The four-speed quick-shift gearbox was also an in-house design. The bodywork on early models was a two-seater roadster with or without cycle fenders, lights, and the various other accoutrements required to make it street legal. OSCA only supplied the chassis; the bodies were manufactured by Italian bodywork companies (or in some cases, by the buyers themselves) to the requirements of the individual buyers. Modifications and changes to keep cars competitive or due to changes in taste means that few preserved cars look much like each other.

While the original barchetta design was factory built, coachworkers such as Morelli, Moho, Vignale, and Pietro Frua soon supplanted the in-house design. In addition to the barchettas, a few examples were built with berlinetta bodies by Frua and Vignale. A Vignale-bodied MT4 Berlinetta won in the 1,100 cc class at the 1953 24 Hours of Le Mans.

== Changes ==
In 1949 the engine was enlarged to 1,342 cc, with power increasing to 80–90 hp (59–66 kW) at 5,500 rpm depending on the tune specified. In 1950, the new DOHC (MT4-2AD) raised power to a maximum of 100 hp (74 kW) at 6,300 rpm for the 1350 engine, and in 1953 the engine was enlarged to 1,453 cc to compete in the 1500 cc class, producing 110 hp (81 kW) at 6,200 rpm. In 1954, this was bored out to a square 78 mm × 78 mm (3.07 in × 3.07 in) for 1,491 cc and fitted with twin sparkplugs. This "proper" 1500 engine produced 120 hp (88 kW) at 6,300 rpm and was aimed directly at the Porsche 550. The bore and stroke of the 1500 engine are the same as those of the Maserati 4CL, also developed by the Maserati brothers.

In a period road test, Road & Track got a MT4-2AD 1500 (chassis number 1148) to reach 120 mph (193 km/h) in spite of having been fitted with the lowest gearing, while doing the 0–60 mph (0–97 km/h) sprint in 7.0 seconds. The listed price was $10,000, enough to buy three V8-engined Ford Thunderbirds with a good margin, but on the other Road & Track stated that the OSCA had outperformed every lower-priced car ever tested by them. The reviewers also remarked on the rarity of an Italian-made car matching the manufacturer's claimed top speed, acceleration, and weight figures. The trunk on this example did meet the requirements for competition but mainly housed a spare tire and a 20-US-gallon (76 L) fuel tank. By this time, about half of OSCA's production was earmarked for the United States, with another ten percent being exported elsewhere.

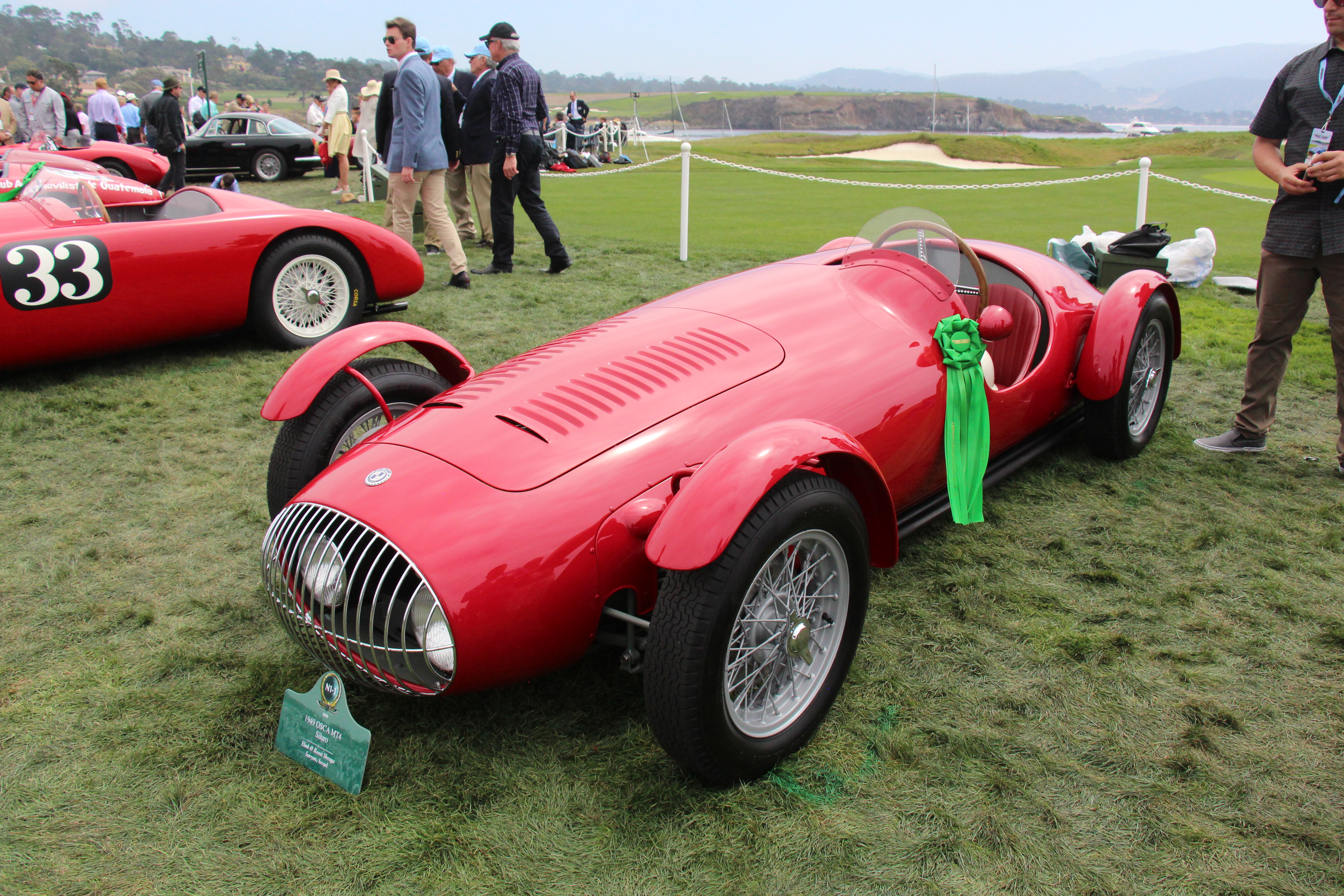
1949 OSCA MT4 'Siluro'

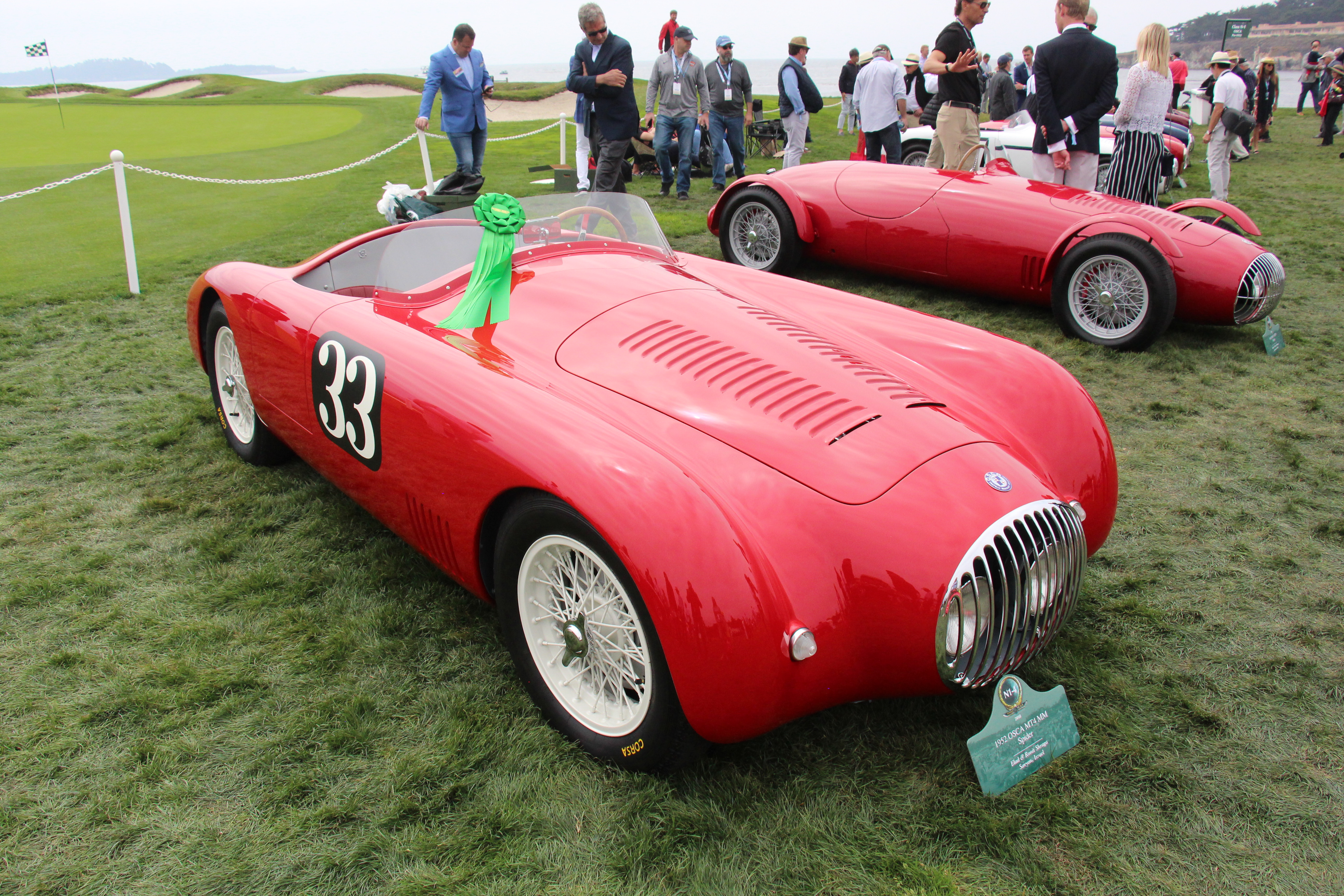
1952 OSCA MT4 MM Spider

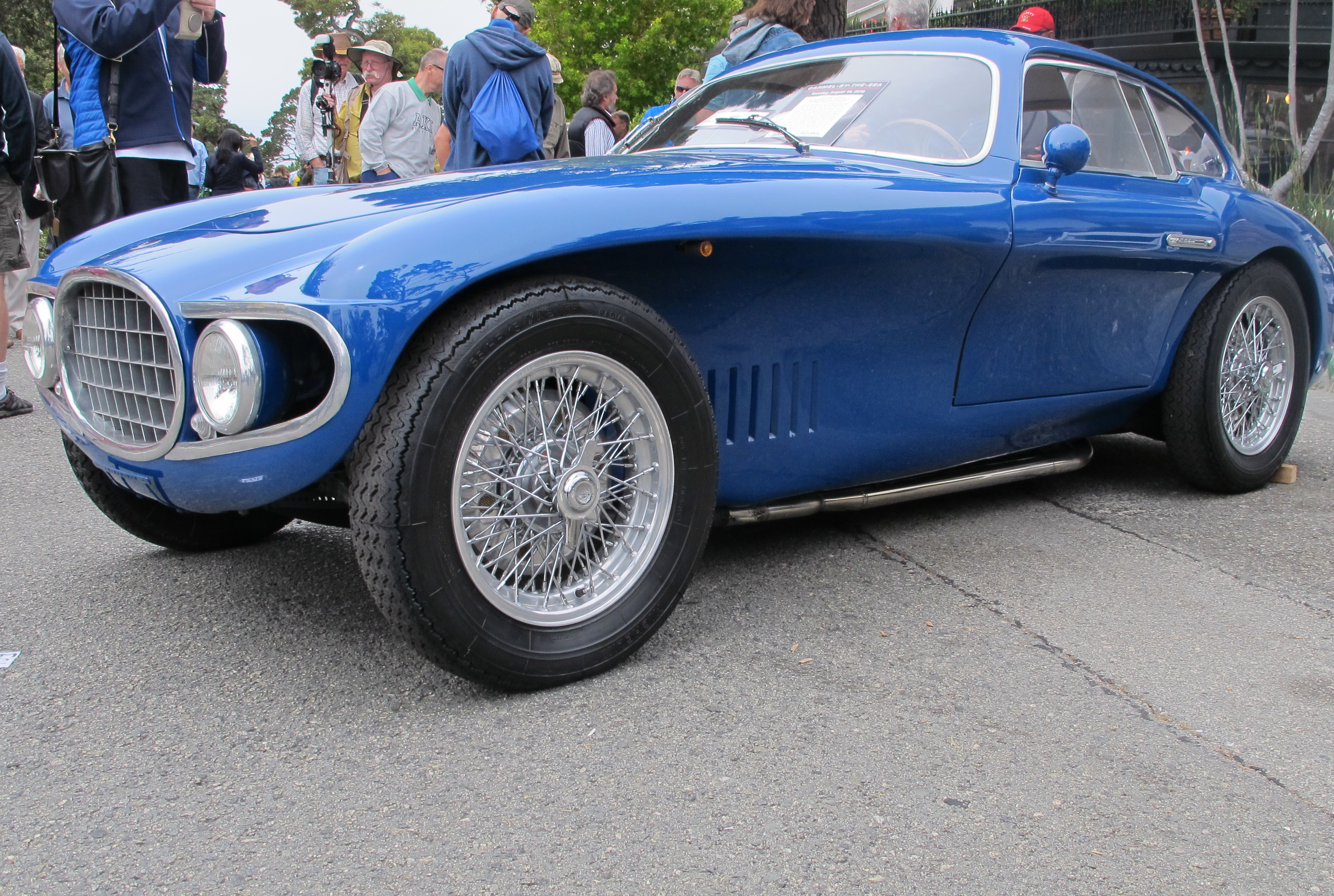
Le Mans class winner MT4 Vignale Berlinetta

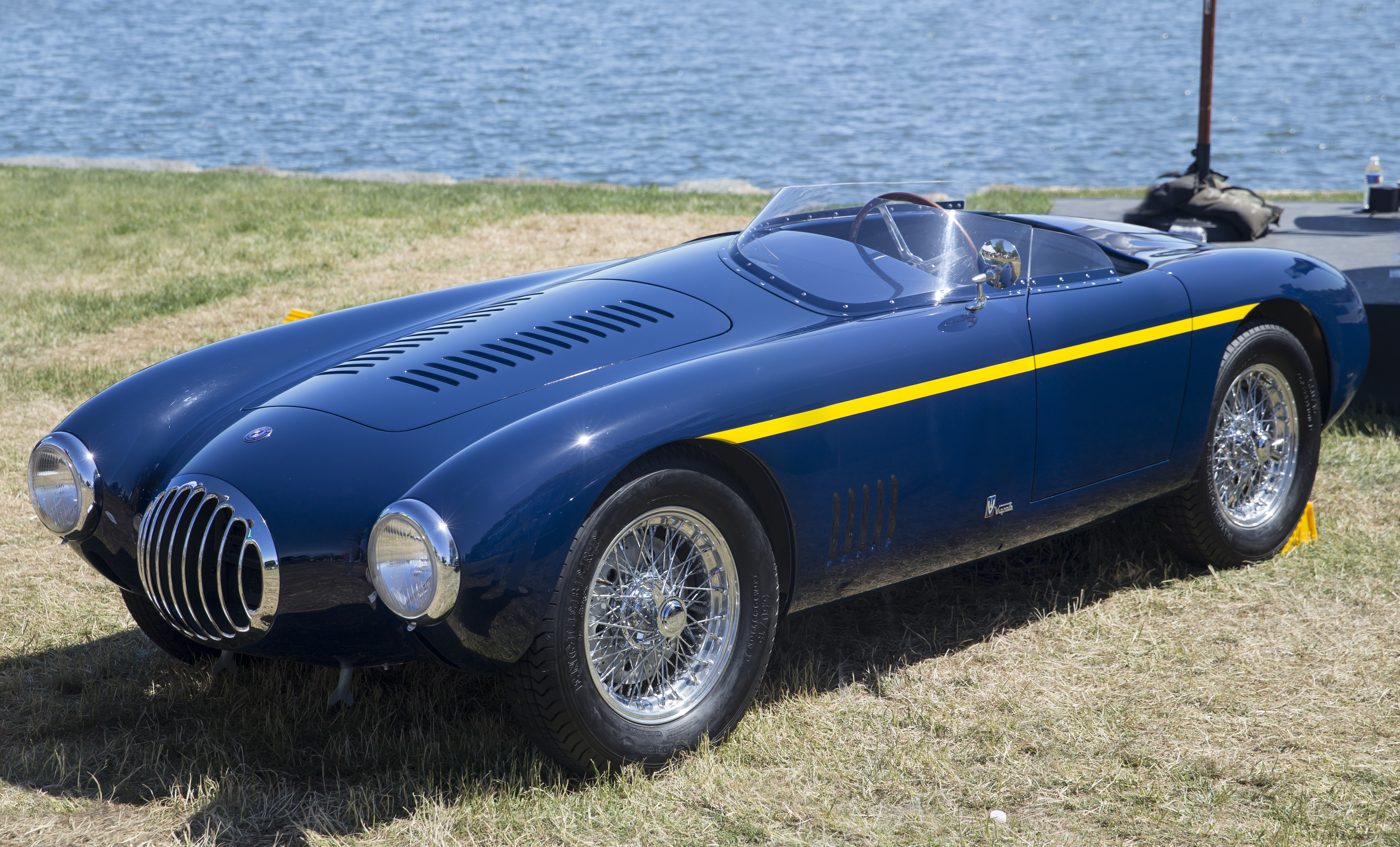
1954 OSCA MT4 1450 Spider by Vignale (fitted with a 1500 engine)

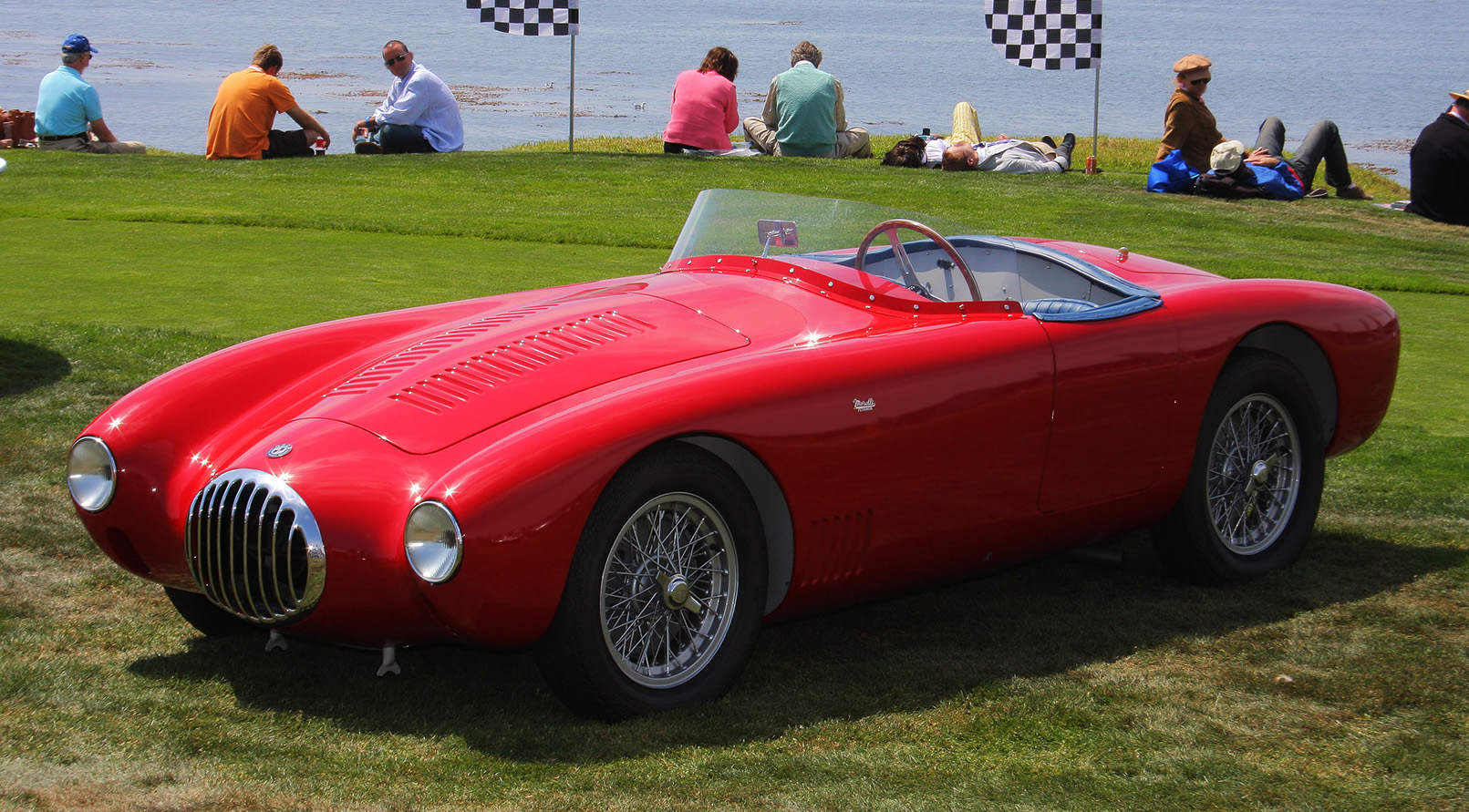
OSCA MT4 Morelli Spider 1955

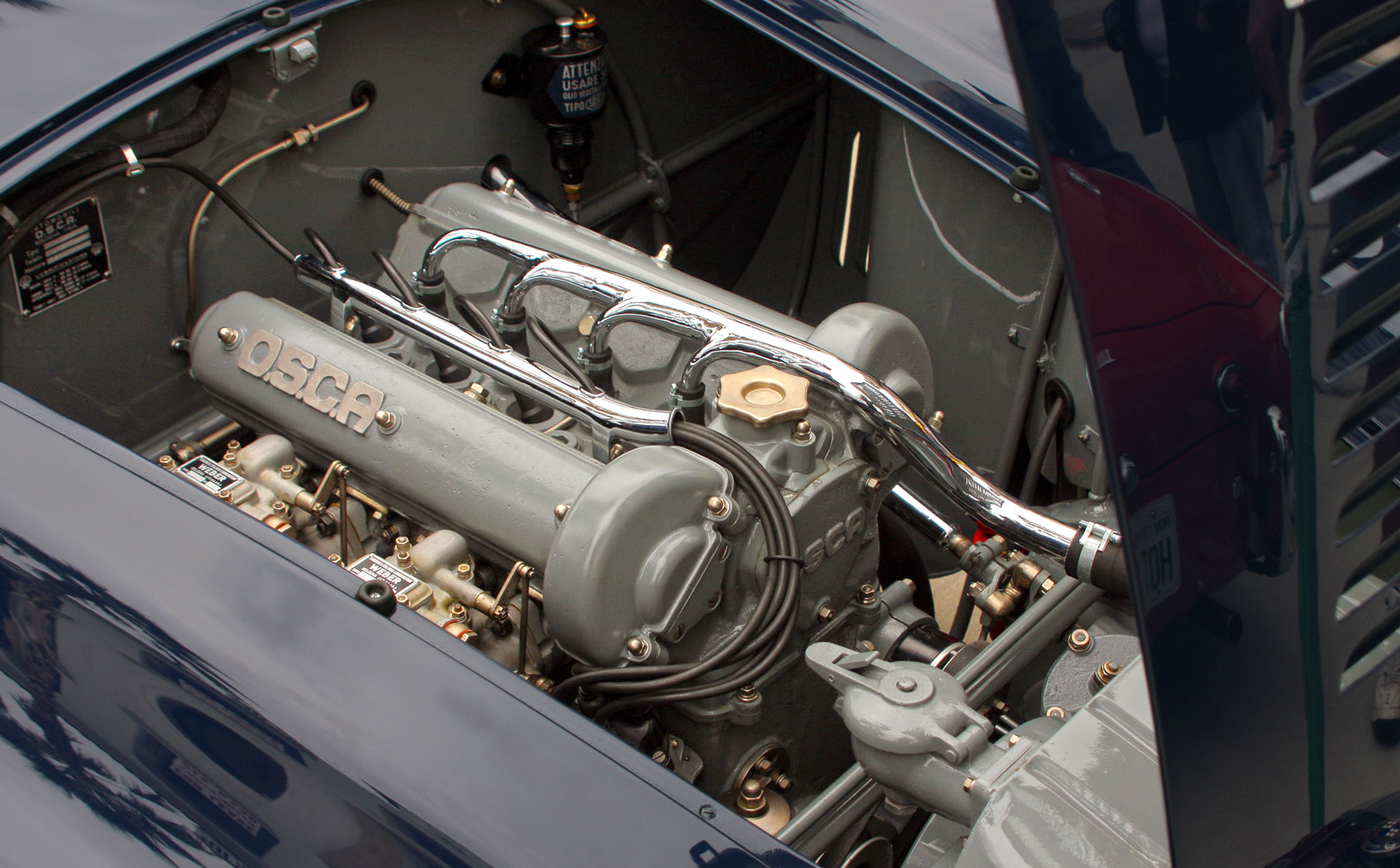
The OSCA twin cam engine

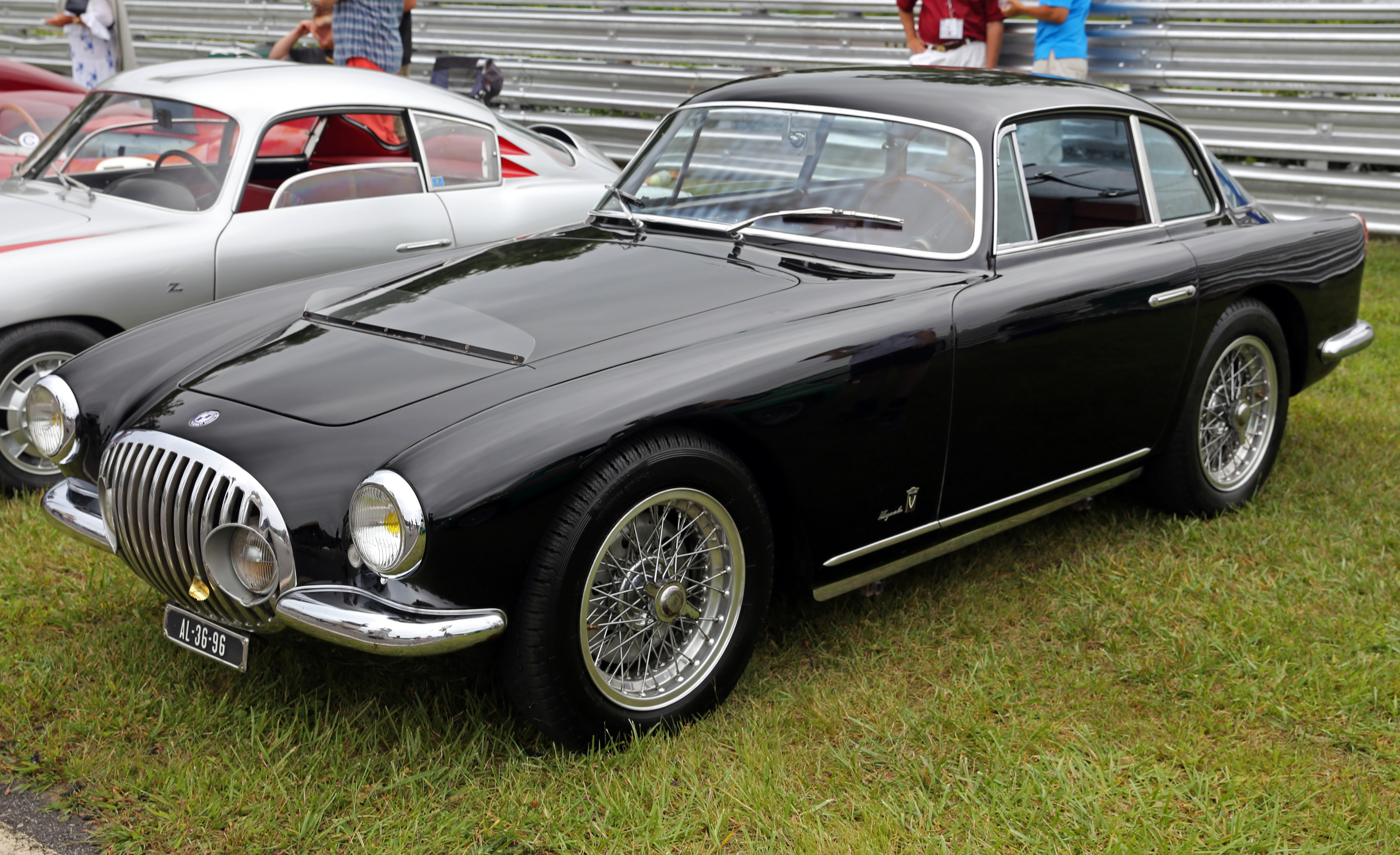
1955 MT4 1500 Coupé by Vignale, one of a handful of MT4 berlinettas

=== 1500 TN ===
The final iteration was the 1500 TN (for Tipo Nuovo, "new model") engine, tuned to 125 hp (92 kW). The first such engine was installed in the Simpson Special; a record-breaking streamliner on an MT4 chassis which beat numerous land speed records at the Bonneville Salt Flats in 1955. In competition, however, the TN engine was too powerful for the MT4 chassis and the Maserati brothers quickly developed a new, more rigid design also called the 1500 TN. The MT4 design, however, was finally reaching the end of its development. The fragile 1500 TN, while fast, rarely finished and only three cars were built in 1955. Three more, called S 1500 TN were finished for the 1957 season and had another five horsepower.

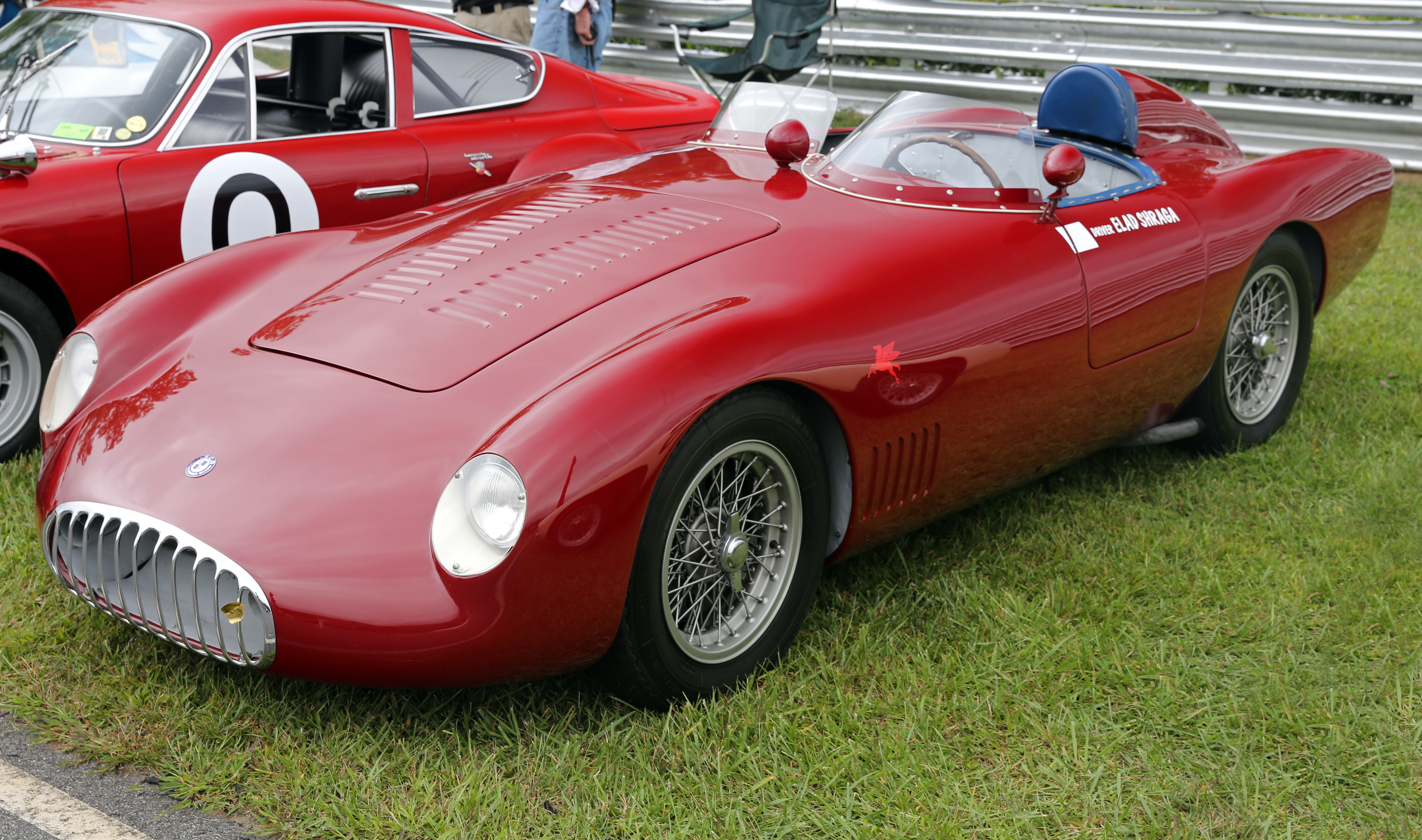
1955 OSCA 1500 TN (chassis 1169)

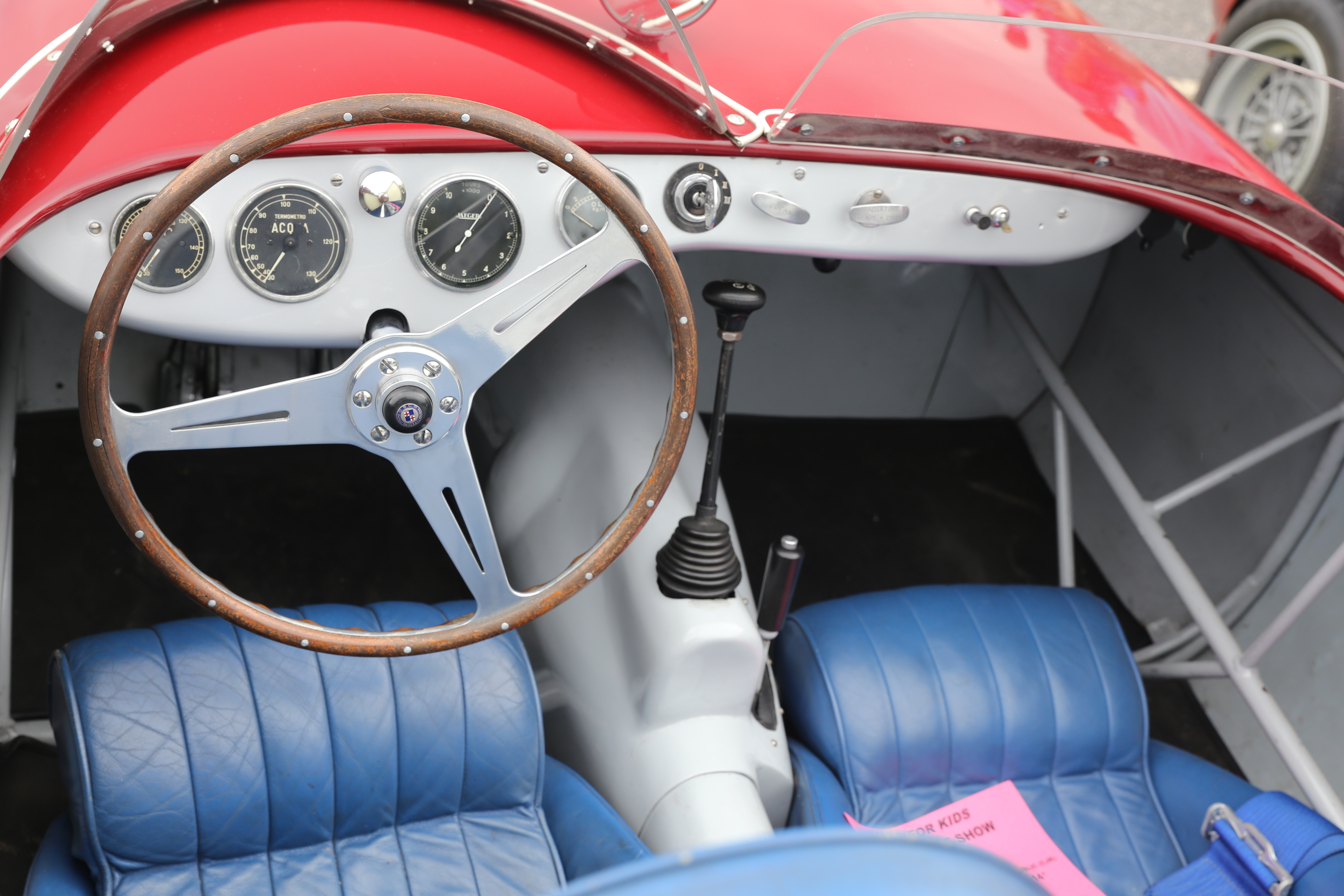
1500 TN interior

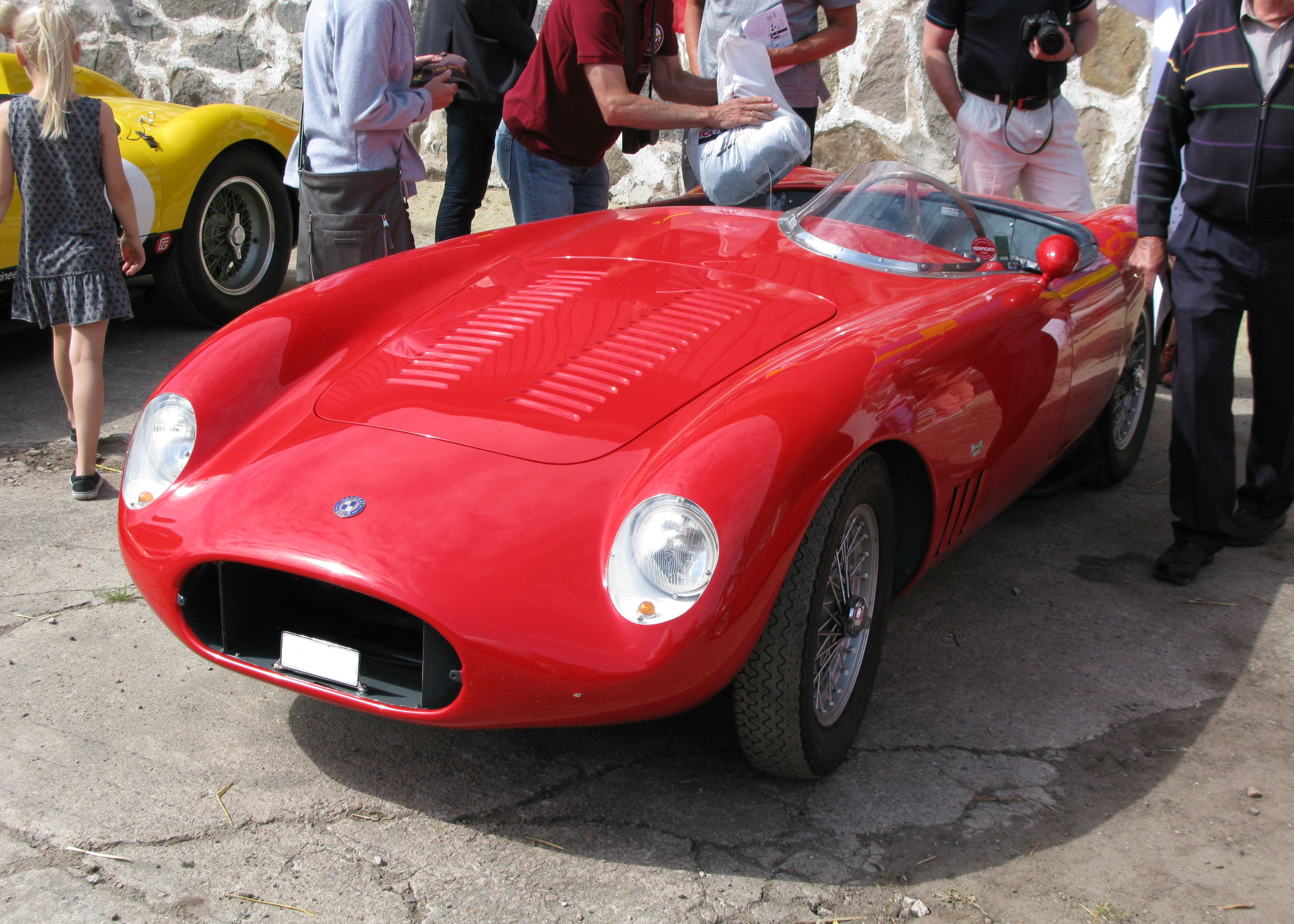
1955 OSCA 1500 TN (chassis 1163)

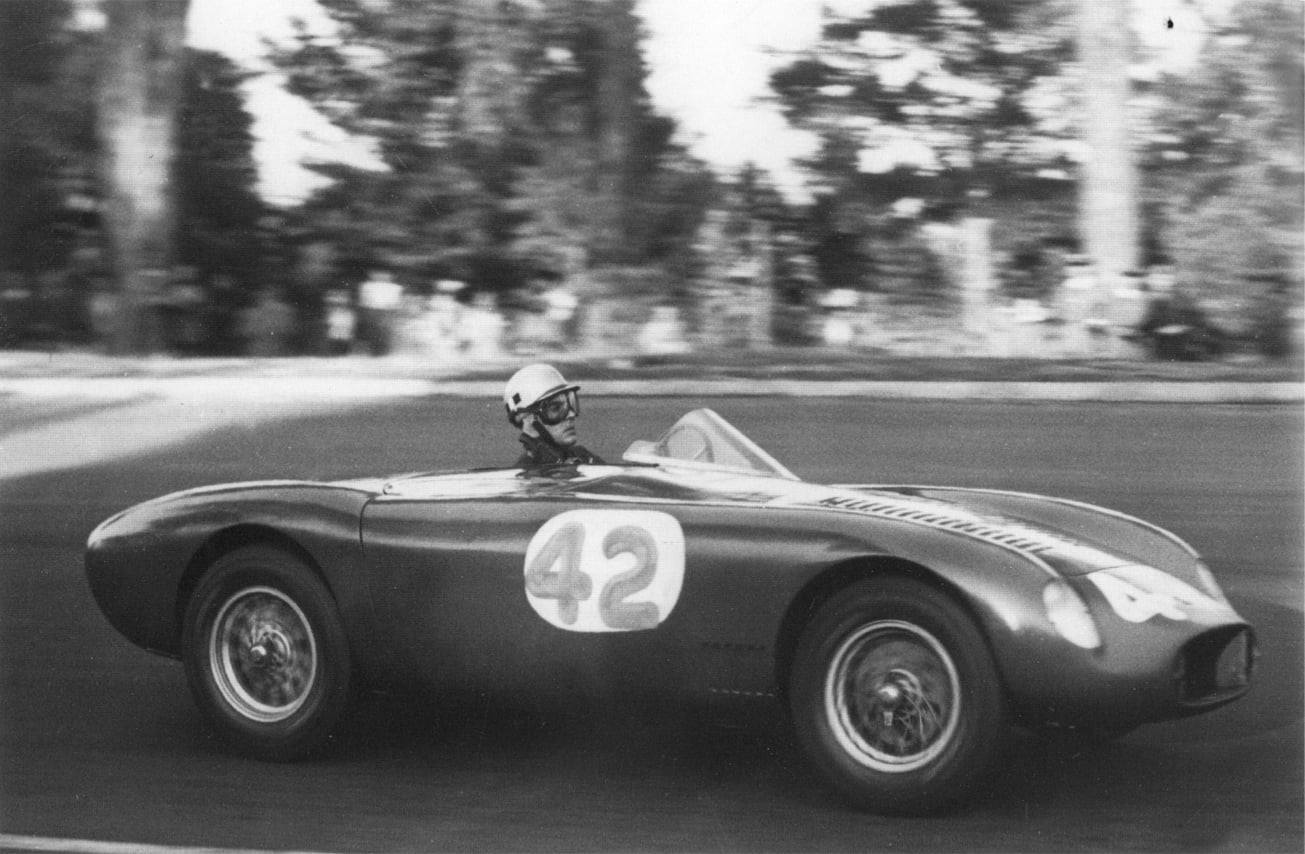
Luigi Musso driving chassis 1163 to a class victory (S1.5) at Rome 1956

The OSCA MT4 is best known for the 1954 12 Hours of Sebring, where it won outright against much more powerful cars with drivers Stirling Moss and Bill Lloyd as part of the Briggs Cunningham Team. In the April 6, 1992 issue of AutoWeek, Cunningham stated that, of all the automobiles he built, owned, and raced, the OSCA was his favorite racecar.

== FS 372 ==
After the MT4, the all new tipo 372 DS engine with desmodromic valves (hence "DS"; 372 represents the individual displacement of each cylinder) was developed for the 1957 Formula 2 season. F2 racing cars are called OSCA F2/S while the sports version, which succeeded the MT4/TN, was called the FS 372. Five FS 372 were built from 1957 until 1959; all were bodied by Morelli. The new engine produces 135 hp (99 kW) in sports racing (FS) trim; the new design meant that unlike on earlier OSCAs, the exhaust exited on the right hand side of the car. One of these belonged to Sir Stirling Moss, who raced his car in historic races across the globe until his retirement in 2011. Derivatives of this engine went on to be used in coupé and convertible models of regular Fiats from 1959 to 1966.

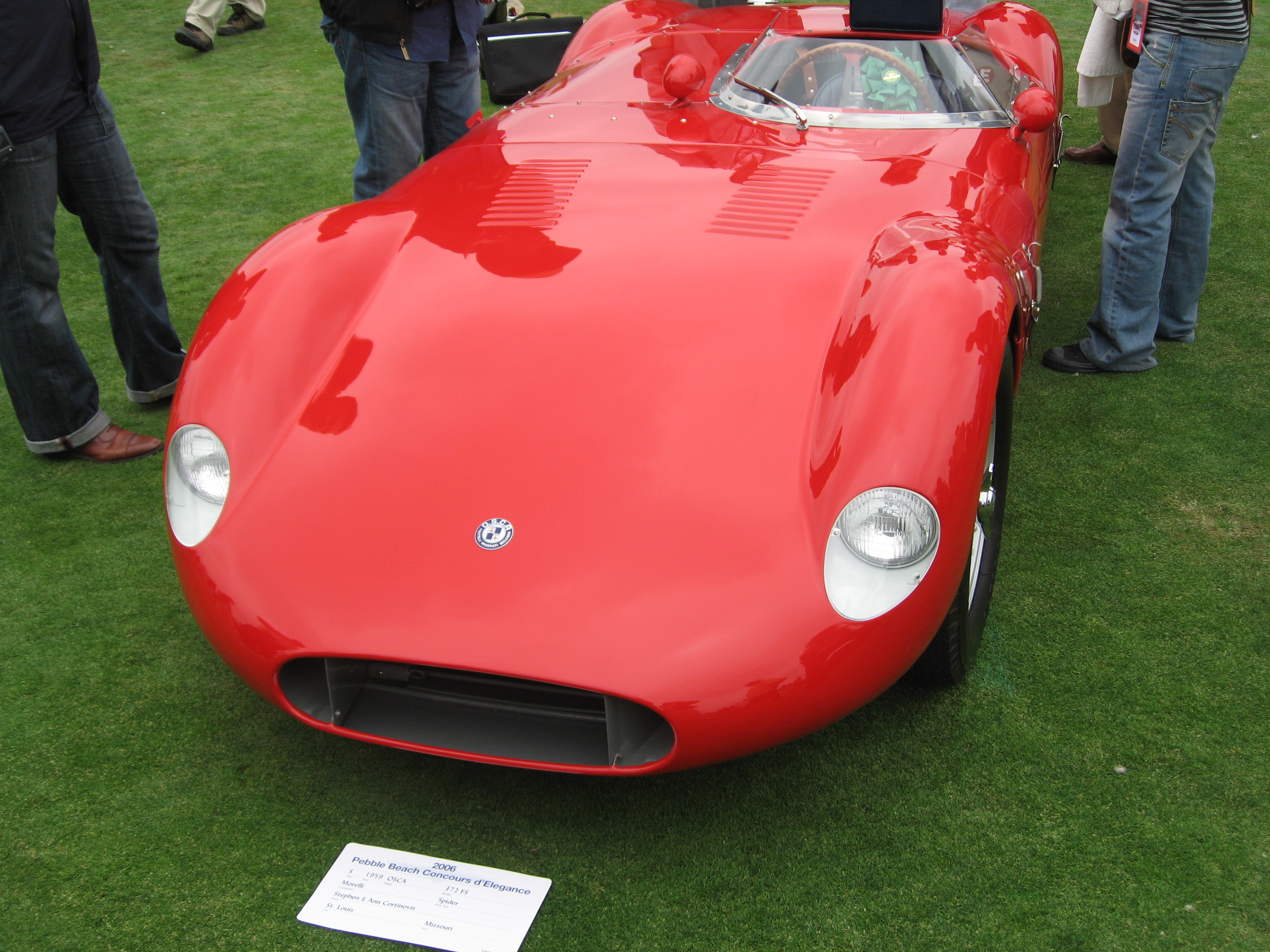
1959 OSCA FS 372 (#1196)

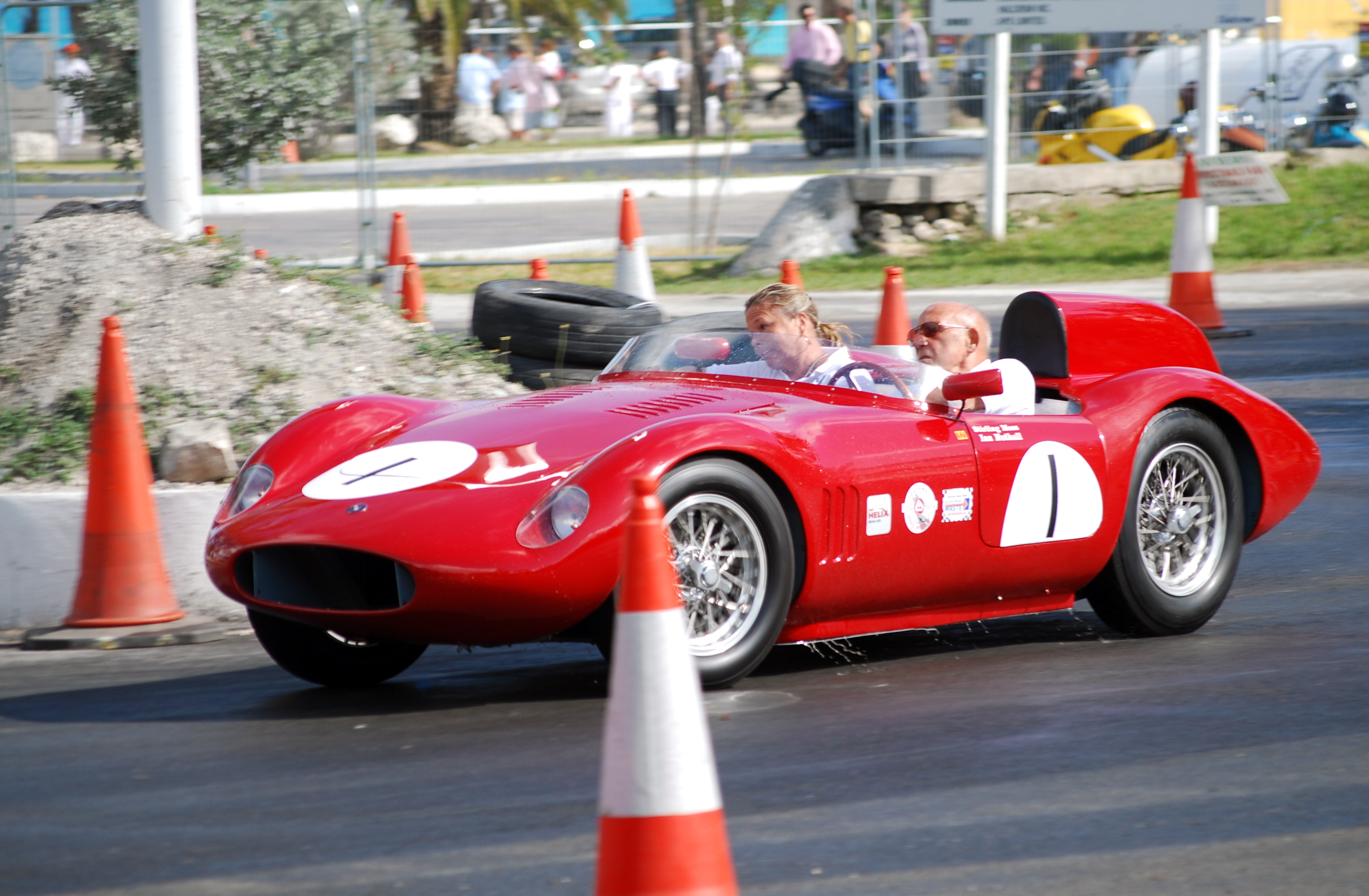
Moss in his FS 372 (#1191) in the Bahamas

== Racing history ==
The starts and racing successes of the MT4 are extensive and go beyond the usual framework of sports car models: 449 entries, 939 race starts, 81 overall, and 98 class victories.

The first use of an MT4 was in 1948 in the Coppa Acerbo sports car race at Pescara. Driving chassis 1101 was Franco Cornacchia, who failed to finish the race. The MT4's first success came later that year, at the Grand Prix of Naples, where it was driven to a win by Luigi Villoresi. In 1949, Giulio Cabianca won a sports car race in Ferrara and three weeks later a race in Tigullio. The Giro delle Calabria was won by Dorino Serafini and Alberico Cacciari ahead of Luigi Fagioli, who also drove an MT4.

From 1950 onwards, the MT4 established itself as a fast racing car that was not prone to defects and was hard to beat in the racing classes with displacements of less than 2 liters. At the Mille Miglia in 1951, Luigi Fagioli won the class for sports cars with displacements of up to 1.1 liters. In the overall standings, he finished eighth, just under an hour behind the winner Villoresi in the Ferrari 340 America Berlinetta Vignale. Cabianca repeated the class win in 1952. In the same year, the model was driven for the first time in the 24 Hours of Le Mans. Mario Damonte and a French racing driver using the pseudonym Martial drove a Vignale-bodied 1.3-liter MT4. Their race ended after 19 hours of driving due to a damaged clutch.

With the start of the sports car world championship in 1953, MT4s were also used there. After countless successes at national races in Europe and the United States, 1954 saw the greatest international success for an MT4. At the 12 Hours of Sebring, Stirling Moss and Bill Lloyd won the general classification for Briggs Cunningham's team. To date, it is the only overall victory for a sports car with a displacement of less than 1.5 liters in this long-distance race.

The light and maneuverable racing cars were often on a par with the high-capacity cars, especially on narrow and winding courses. This was evident, for example, at the 1956 Mille Miglia, where Cabianca and Umberto Maglioli fought for the lead in the early stages of the race with the Ferrari and Maserati works drivers. Gianfranco Stanga celebrated the last race victory with an MT4 at the Campagnana Vallelunga in 1961, ahead of an OSCA S1000 and a number of Etceterini. The last known use outside of historical races was in 1966 in the sports car world championship. Giuseppe Rossi finished 38th overall and won the class for prototypes with a displacement of up to 2 liters at the Mugello 500 km race.
