= Ferrari 125 S =

1.5 litre racing car built in 1947 by Ferrari

- Franco Cortese driving the Ferrari 125S s/n 01C at Circuito di Piacenza on 11 May 1947

Overview
- Manufacturer: Ferrari
- Production: 1947; 2 produced
- Designer: Gioacchino Colombo

Body and chassis
- Class: Sports car
- Layout: FR layout

Powertrain
- Engine: 1.5 L (1496.77 cc) Colombo V12
- Transmission: 5-speed manual

Dimensions
- Wheelbase: 2,420 mm (95.3 in)
- Curb weight: 650 kg (1,433 lb) (dry)

Chronology
- Predecessor: Auto Avio Costruzioni 815
- Successor: Ferrari 159 S

The Ferrari 125 S (commonly 125 or 125 Sport) is a 1.5 litre sports car built in 1947 by automaker Ferrari in Modena, Italy. It was the company's first vehicle, of which only two were made.

Although preceded by Enzo Ferrari's Auto Avio Costruzioni 815 of 1940, the 125 S was the first vehicle to bear the Ferrari name when it debuted on 11 May 1947 at the Piacenza racing circuit. Like the 815, but unlike its inline-8 predecessor, partly developed from Fiat engine components, the 125 S featured a Ferrari designed and built engine; the Colombo V12 (the "125"), a trait it shared with most Ferrari cars of the following decades. The 125 S was replaced by the 159 S later in 1947.

== Overview ==
=== Chassis ===
The 125 S used a steel tube-frame chassis and had a double wishbone suspension with transverse leaf springs in front with a live axle in the rear. Hydraulic power drum brakes were specified front and rear.

=== Engine ===
The 1.5 litre V12 engine

The 125 S was powered by Gioacchino Colombo's 1.5 L (1497 cc/91 in³) 60° V12 with a bore/stroke of 55 x 52.5 mm . This engine produced 118 bhp (87 kW) at 6,800 rpm with a compression ratio of 9.5:1. It was a single overhead camshaft design with 2 valves per cylinder and three double-choke Weber 30DCF carburettors.

=== Transmission ===
Dashboard of s/n 01C

A five-speed transmission was used in the 125 S as it was better able to exploit the power curves of the high revving V-12 better than a traditional four-speed gearbox.

== Examples ==
One of the two Ferrari 125 S examples is located in the "Vault", which is the lowest level of the Petersen Automotive Museum in California. Ref 4.

=== Chassis 010I ===
The freshly restored s/n 010i when presented at Pebble Beach Concours in 2006

Recently, the chassis with serial number 010I was used in the restoration of a 125 S. It is rumoured that 010I is actually s/n 01C. The story goes that 01C was re-stamped as 010I, and sold to a customer as a new car. Upon taking receipt of the car, the new owner immediately exclaimed, muletto!, which means "Test mule" in Italian, as he could clearly see that his supposedly new car was in fact a used, well-raced car. Ferrari made a new invoice for the car, including a considerable rebate given the car's second-hand nature.

Still in 166 Spyder Corsa configuration, the car was recently sold to Symbolic Motors. Close inspection of the chassis and its serial number led to the discovery of an old stamping that could possibly read 01C. It had been covered by an aluminum plate which bore the serial number 010I. Subsequently, the car was sold to its current owner, who refitted the chassis with a body similar to the factory's 125 S replica, which was built by Michelotto in 1987. The alleged 01C made its public debut at the Pebble Beach Concours d'Elegance, and was entered as a "Ferrari 125 S". The car continues to be the subject of much debate among Ferrari historians and enthusiasts; recent developments indicate that the restamped serial number was in fact a correction and not an alteration.

== Racing ==
The 125 S debuted at the Circuito di Piacenza, driven by Franco Cortese, but was unable to finish the race, despite a favorable showing against the strong Maserati 6CS 1500s.

Two weeks later, the 125 S claimed Ferrari's first victory at the Grand Prix of Rome on the Terme di Caracalla Circuit, where it was also driven by Cortese. The car had spun a bearing in practice, and was repaired in the shop of Tino Martinoli, who later came to America with the Ferrari Indy car team.

The 125 S won six of its fourteen races in 1947, though drivers Clemente Biondetti and Giuseppe Navone were unable to win the 1947 Mille Miglia in it.
