= Franco Comotti =

Italian racing driver (1906–1963)

- Born: Gianfranco Comotti; 24 July 1906 Brescia, Lombardy, Italy
- Died: 10 May 1963 (aged 56) Bergamo, Lombardy, Italy

Formula One World Championship career
- Nationality: (Italy) Italian
- Active years: 1950, 1952
- Team(s): Maserati, Ferrari
- Entries: 2
- Championships: 0
- Wins: 0
- Podiums: 0
- Career points: 0
- Pole positions: 0
- Fastest laps: 0
- First entry: 1950 Italian Grand Prix
- Last entry: 1952 French Grand Prix

24 Hours of Le Mans career
- Years: 1938
- Teams: Ecurie Bleue
- Best finish: DNF (1938)
- Class wins: 0

Gianfranco Comotti (24 July 1906 – 10 May 1963) was an Italian racing driver. He participated in two World Championship Formula One Grands Prix, debuting on 3 September 1950. He scored no championship points. He also participated in numerous non-Championship Formula One races.

== Racing career ==
A native of Bergamo, he first appeared at the 1928 Italian Grand Prix in one of Scuderia Materassi’s Talbots. After this race Comotti disappeared from the racing scene, later withdrawing his entry into the 1929 Indianapolis 500. He returned in 1931, winning the cyclecar race at the Circuito di Alessandria in a Salmson. He then brought an Alfa Romeo Monza sports car to Scuderia Ferrari in Modena for servicing and became an official driver for the team in 1932. In 1934 Comotti won the Grand Prix du Comminges for Ferrari. Later that year he finished third at the 1934 Italian Grand Prix together with Carlo Felice Trossi. Comotti continued to drive for Ferrari until the end of 1935.

In 1937, Comotti moved to France and joined the Talbot team as a test driver. He tested cars for clients and was a reserve driver for the racing team. That year he won the RAC Tourist Trophy at Donington Park. Comotti left the team at the end of the season and joined Laurie and Lucy Schell's Ecurie Bleue racing for 1938, driving a Delahaye. That year he made his first Grand Prix start at Germany, and also made his only start at Le Mans. But he retired early in both races.

After the war, Comotti became a test driver of the new Talbot-Lago T26C. He also made some Grand Prix start with that car in 1948. In 1950 Comotti became a test driver for Scuderia Milano and also made his first World Championship Formula One Grands Prix at the Italian Grand Prix. He made his second and last World Championship Grand Prix start at the 1952 French Grand Prix, driving a Ferrari for Scuderia Marzotto.

Comotti was one of nine founders of the Club international des anciens pilotes de Grand Prix F1 (1962).

== Personal life ==
Comotti was born in Brescia, but grew up in Bergamo. He worked in the oil business for his entire life. In 1932, he married Anna Maria Peduzzi (1912–79), who was one of the best female drivers of Italy. Her career lasted even longer than her husband’s.

After his retirement from racing, Comotti worked for BP in North Africa.

== Racing record ==
=== Complete 24 Hours of Le Mans results ===
| Year | Team | Co-Drivers | Car | Class | Laps | Pos. | Class Pos. |
|---|---|---|---|---|---|---|---|
| 1938 | (France) Ecurie Bleue | (France) Albert Divo | Delahaye 145 | 5.0 | 7 | DNF | DNF |

=== Complete European Championship results ===
(key)

| Year | Entrant | Chassis | Engine | 1 | 2 | 3 | 4 | EDC | Pts |
|---|---|---|---|---|---|---|---|---|---|
| 1938 | Ecurie Bleue | Delahaye 145 | Delahaye 4.5 V12 | FRA | GER; Ret | SUI | ITA | 31st | 31 |

=== Post WWII Grandes Épreuves results ===
(key)

| Year | Entrant | Chassis | Engine | 1 | 2 | 3 | 4 |
|---|---|---|---|---|---|---|---|
| 1947 | Edmond Mouche | Talbot Spéciale | Talbot 4.0 L6 | SUI | BEL | ITA | FRA; 6 |
| 1948 | Gianfranco Comotti | Talbot-Lago T26C | Talbot 23CV 4.5 L6 | MON | SUI; Ret | FRA; 4 | ITA; 7 |

=== Complete Formula One World Championship results ===
(key)

| Year | Entrant | Chassis | Engine | 1 | 2 | 3 | 4 | 5 | 6 | 7 | 8 | WDC | Pts |
|---|---|---|---|---|---|---|---|---|---|---|---|---|---|
| 1950 | Scuderia Achille Varzi | Maserati 4CLT/48 | Maserati 4CLT 1.5 L4s | GBR | MON | 500 | SUI | BEL | FRA; DNA | | | NC | 0 |
| 1950 | Scuderia Milano | Maserati 4CLT/50 | Milano 1.5 L4s | | | | | | | ITA; Ret | | NC | 0 |
| 1952 | Scuderia Marzotto | Ferrari 166 | Ferrari 166 2.0 V12 | SUI | 500 | BEL | FRA; 12 | GBR | GER | NED | ITA | NC | 0 |
