= Ferrari 125 F1 =

Ferrari's first Formula One car

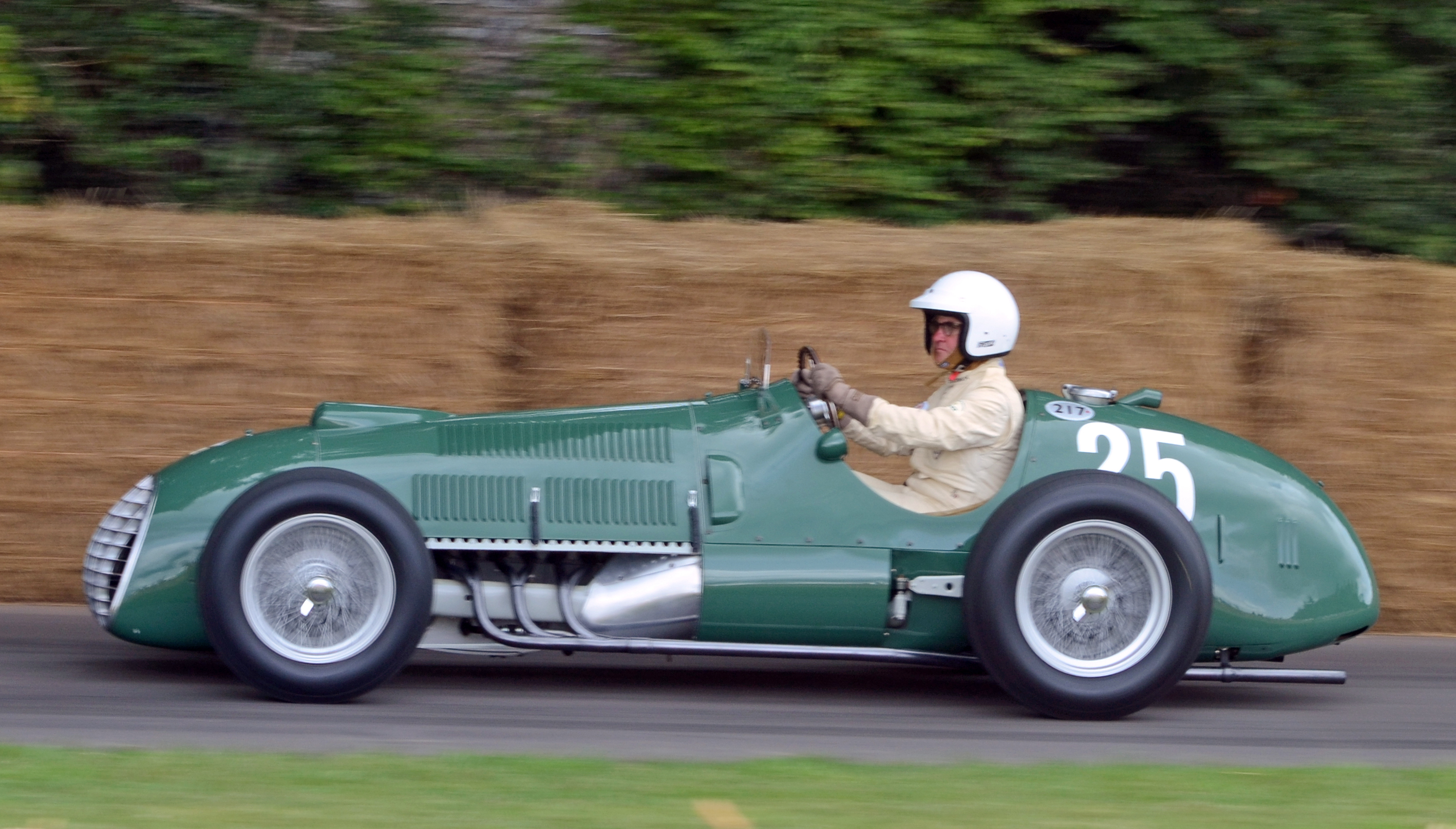
- Category: Formula One car
- Constructor: Ferrari
- Designers: Enzo Ferrari, Gioacchino Colombo, Valerio Colotti
- Production: 1948–1950
- Successor: 375 F1/166 F2

Technical specifications
- Suspension (front): double wishbone suspension with a transverse leaf spring
- Suspension (rear): torsion bar, upgraded to a de Dion tube for 1950
- Length: 3,685 mm (145.1 in)
- Width: 1,400 mm (55.1 in)
- Height: 1,025 mm (40.4 in)
- Wheelbase: 2,160 mm (85.0 in); 2,320 mm (91.3 in)
- Engine: Ferrari Colombo 1,497 cc (91.4 cu in) V12 supercharged
- Weight: 710 kg (1,565.3 lb)
- Tyres: Dunlop; Pirelli

Competition history
- Notable entrants: Scuderia Ferrari
- Debut: 1948 Italian Grand Prix
Wins	Podiums
2	9

The 125 F1 is Ferrari's first Formula One car. It shared its name with the 125 S sports racer which preceded it by a year, but was developed at the same time by Enzo Ferrari, Valerio Colotti and designer Gioacchino Colombo. Initially the racer was called 125 GPC for Gran Premio Città or Grand Prix Compressore before the Formula One era.

== Mechanical details ==
The 125 F1 used a supercharged 1.5-litre V12 engine and sported a steel tube-frame chassis with longitudinal and cross members. It had a double wishbone suspension with a transverse leaf spring in front and a torsion bar in the rear which was upgraded to a de Dion tube for 1950. Worm and sector steering and four-wheel drum brakes were the norm for the time. The 2,160 mm (85 in) wheelbase was uprated to 2,320 mm (91 in) in the 1949 redesign. The chassis and transmission design was by Valerio Colotti.

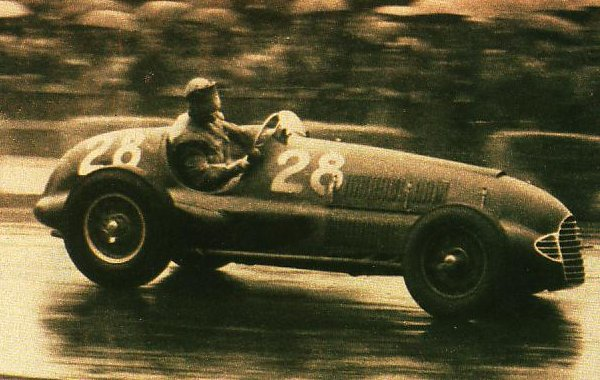
Ferrari 125 GPitaliaTO 1948 Sommer

The 125 F1 was powered by Colombo's 1.5-litre (1497 cc/91 in^{3}) V12. The engine's name, and the car powered by it, the 125 S sports racer, were derived from the tiny 124.73 cc (7.6 cu in) 55 mm (2.17 in) by 52.5 mm (2.07 in) cylinders. It had a single overhead camshaft on each bank of cylinders with a 60° angle between the two banks. The engine had two valves per cylinder fed through one Weber 40DOC3 or 50WCF carburettor. With just a 6.5:1 compression ratio, the supercharged engine still produced 230 PS (169 kW; 227 hp) at 7000 rpm. However, the Roots-type single-stage supercharger was incapable of producing the high-end power required to compete with the strong eight-cylinder Alfa Romeo 158 and four-cylinder Maserati 4CLT. Strong driving and a nimble chassis, however, allowed the company to place third in its first outing, at the Italian Grand Prix on 5 September 1948 and the company persevered in racing.

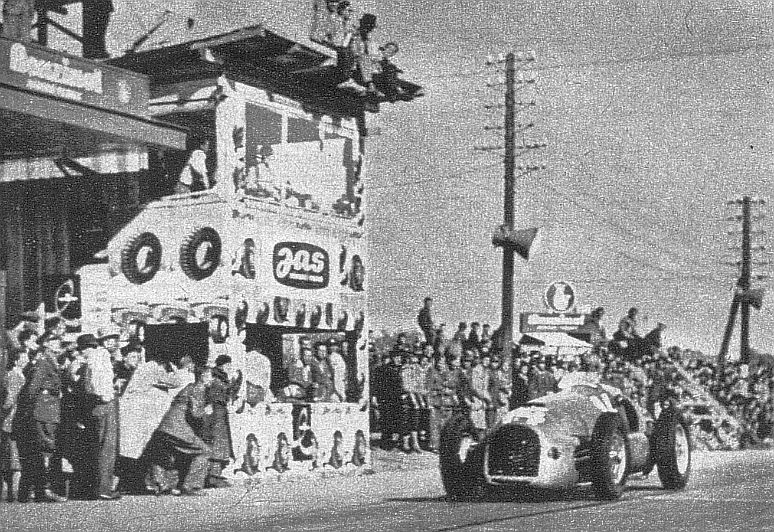
Peter Whitehead, Ferrari 125, winner Grand Prix Czechoslovakia (Brno 1949)

For 1949, the engine was further modified with dual overhead camshafts (though still two valves per cylinder) and a two-stage supercharger. This combination gave the car better top-end performance and the resulting 260–280 PS (191–206 kW; 256–276 hp) gave it five Grand Prix wins. Development continued the following year, but the problematic superchargers were dropped in favor of larger displacement and Lampredi's 275 engine superseded the original Colombo engine.

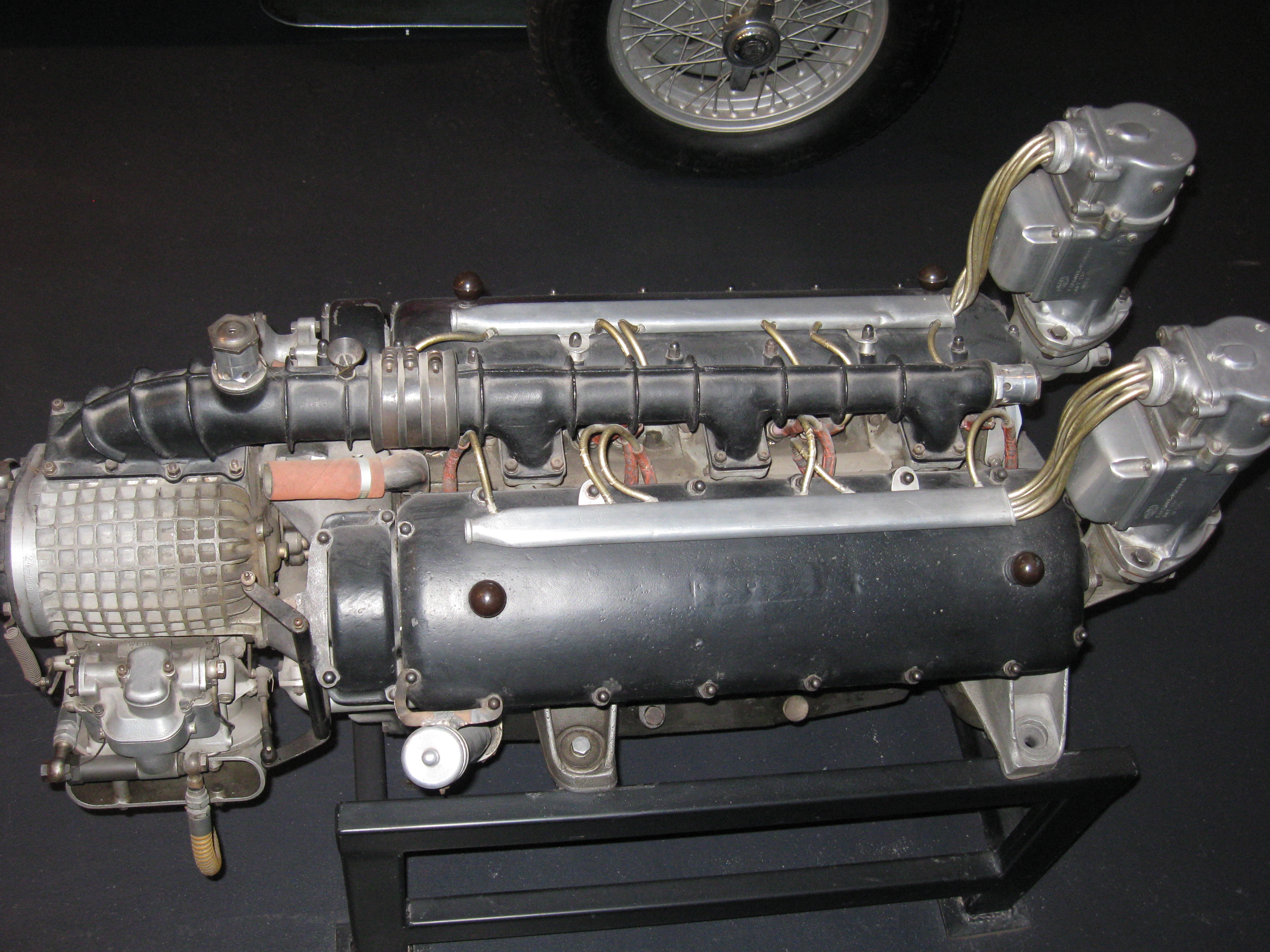
Ferrari 125 F1 V12 supercharged

The original chassis have been lost (used for Ferrari 275 F1), but an exact replica with the original Colombo engine currently resides in Museo Ferrari in Maranello alongside newer Ferrari F1 machines.

== Technical data ==
Technical data	125 GP	125 F1	166 F2
Engine:	Front mounted 60° 12 cylinder V engine
displacement:	1497 cm^{3}		1995 cm^{3}
Bore x stroke:	55 x 52.5 mm		60 x 58.8 mm
Compression:	6.5:1	7.0:1	11.0:1
Max power at rpm:	230 hp at 7 000 rpm	280 hp at 7 500 rpm	155 hp at 7 000 rpm
Valve control:	One overhead camshaft per cylinder row	Dual Overhead Camshafts per cylinder bank	One overhead camshaft per cylinder row
Carburetor:	1 Weber 40 DO3C	1 Weber 50 WCF	3 Weber 32 DCF
Upload:	Roots compressor	Double; Roots compressors	-
Gearbox:	5-speed manual
Suspension front:	Double cross links, transverse leaf spring
Suspension rear:	Pendulum axle, transverse leaf spring	De Dion axle, transverse leaf spring	Pendulum axle, longitudinal torsion bars
Brakes:	Hydraulic drum brakes
Chassis and body:	Oval tubular frame with aluminum body
Wheelbase:	216 cm
Dry weight:	710 kg		710 kg
Dry speed:	260 km/h		235 km/h

== Racing ==
The 125 F1 debuted at the Italian Grand Prix on 5 September 1948. Three cars were fielded, with drivers Prince Bira of Siam, Nino Farina, and Raymond Sommer, who placed third in the race.

Victories
Date	Location	Driver
24 October 1948	Circuito del Garda, Salò	Giuseppe Farina
3 July 1949	Swiss Grand Prix, Bremgarten	Alberto Ascari
31 July 1949	Zandvoort Grand Prix	Luigi Villoresi
20 August 1949	Daily Express Trophy, Silverstone	Alberto Ascari
11 September 1949	Italian Grand Prix, Monza	Alberto Ascari
25 September 1949	Czechoslovakian Grand Prix, Brno	Peter Whitehead
13 July 1950	Jersey Road Race	Peter Whitehead
12 August 1950	Ulster Trophy, Dundrod	Peter Whitehead
1 October 1950	Interstate Race, Interlagos	Francisco Landi
27 January 1951	São Paulo Grand Prix	Francisco Landi
20 May 1951	Governador Noguera Garcez Race, Interlagos	Francisco Landi
28 June 1951	Bõa Vista Grand Prix, Rio de Janeiro	Francisco Landi

== Complete Formula One World Championship results ==
(key) (results in bold indicate pole position, results in italics indicate fastest lap)

Year	Engine	Tyres	Drivers	1	2	3	4	5	6	7	8
1950	Ferrari 125 F1 1.5 V12	D		GBR	MON	500	SUI	BEL	FRA	ITA	
1950	Ferrari 125 F1 1.5 V12	D	(United Kingdom) Peter Whitehead		DNS				3	7	
1950	Ferrari 125 F1 1.5 V12	P	(Italy) Luigi Villoresi		Ret		Ret	6	DNS		
1950	Ferrari 125 F1 1.5 V12	P	(Italy) Alberto Ascari		2		Ret				
1950	Ferrari 125 F1 1.5 V12	P	(France) Raymond Sommer		4						
1951	Ferrari 125 F1 1.5 V12	D		SUI	500	BEL	FRA	GBR	GER	ITA	ESP
1951	Ferrari 125 F1 1.5 V12	D	(United Kingdom) Peter Whitehead	Ret			Ret				
1951	Ferrari 125 F1 1.5 V12	P	(United Kingdom) Peter Whitehead							Ret	
1952	Ferrari 166 F2 2.0 V12	D		SUI	500	BEL	FRA	GBR	GER	NED	ITA
1952	Ferrari 166 F2 2.0 V12	D	(United Kingdom) Peter Whitehead					10			DNQ

=== Post-WWII Grandes Épreuves results ===
(key) (Races in bold indicate pole position) (Races in italics indicate fastest lap)

Year	Entrant	Engine	Drivers	1	2	3	4	5
1948	Scuderia Ferrari	Ferrari 125 F1 1.5 V12		MON	SUI	FRA	ITA	GBR
1948	Scuderia Ferrari	Ferrari 125 F1 1.5 V12	(France) Raymond Sommer				3	DNA
1948	Scuderia Ferrari	Ferrari 125 F1 1.5 V12	(Thailand) B. Bira				NC	
1948	Scuderia Ferrari	Ferrari 125 F1 1.5 V12	(Italy) Giuseppe Farina				Ret	DNA
1949	Scuderia Ferrari	Ferrari 125 F1 1.5 V12		GBR	BEL	SUI	FRA	ITA
1949	Scuderia Ferrari	Ferrari 125 F1 1.5 V12	(Italy) Alberto Ascari		3	1	WD	**1**
1949	Scuderia Ferrari	Ferrari 125 F1 1.5 V12	(Italy) Luigi Villoresi		**2**	2	**Ret**	Ret
1949	Scuderia Ferrari	Ferrari 125 F1 1.5 V12	(Italy) Felice Bonetto					Ret
1949	Scuderia Ferrari	Ferrari 125 F1 1.5 V12	(France) Raymond Sommer					5
1949	Scuderia Ferrari	Ferrari 125 F1 1.5 V12	(United Kingdom) Dudley Folland	8*				
1949	Scuderia Ferrari	Ferrari 125 F1 1.5 V12	(United Kingdom) Peter Whitehead	8*		9		
1949	private	Ferrari 125 F1 1.5 V12	(United Kingdom) Peter Whitehead		4		3	Ret

* Indicates shared drive with Dorino Serafini
