= Philippe Étancelin =

French racing driver (1896–1981)

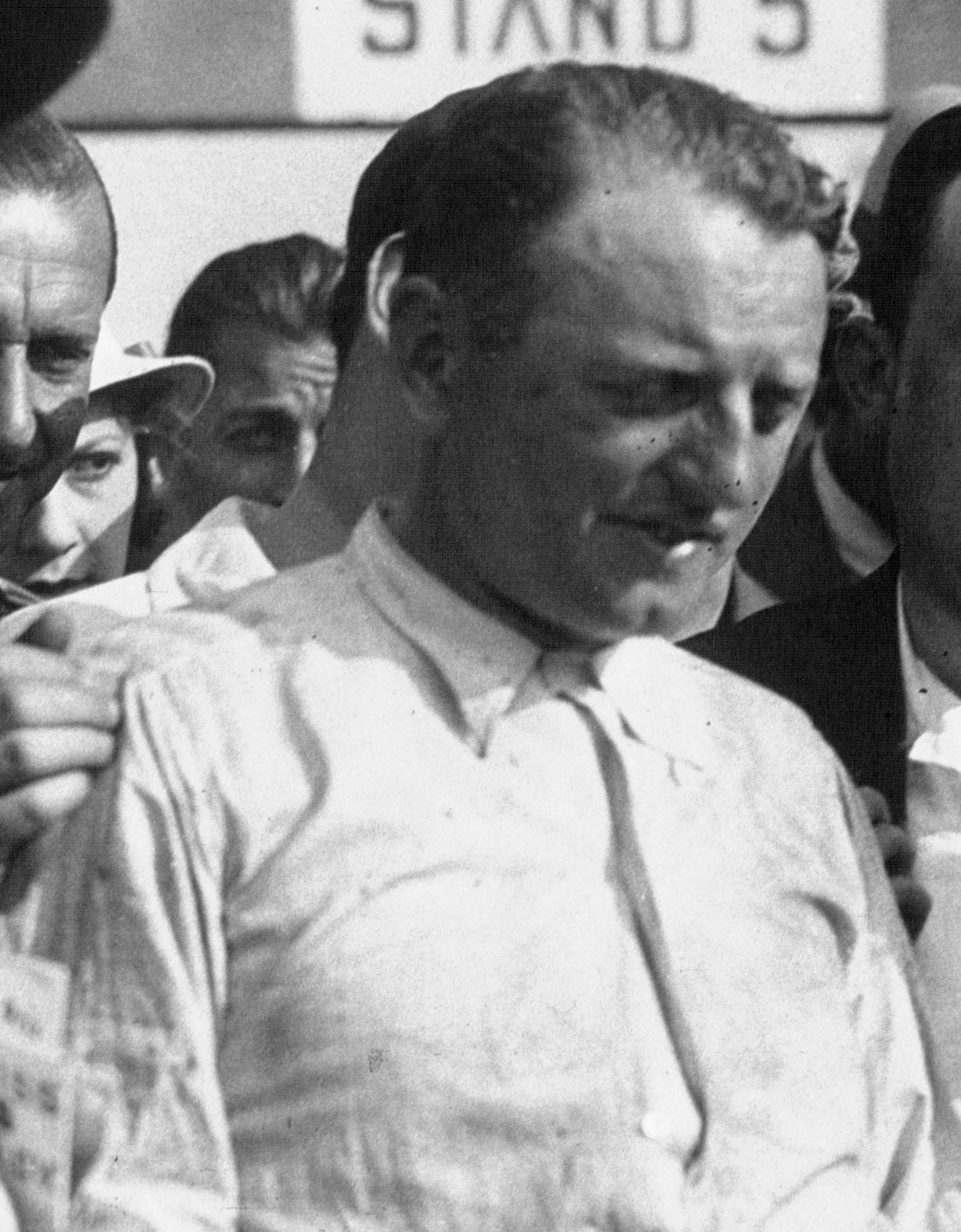
- Étancelin at the 1933 Grand Prix de la Marne
- Born: Philippe Jean Armand Étancelin; 28 December 1896 Rouen, Seine-Inférieure, France
- Died: 13 October 1981 (aged 84) Neuilly-sur-Seine, Hauts-de-Seine, France

Championship titles
- Major victories 24 Hours of Le Mans (1934)

Formula One World Championship career
- Nationality: (France) French
- Active years: 1950–1952
- Team(s): Talbot-Lago (works and non-works), Maserati (non-works)
- Entries: 12
- Championships: 0
- Wins: 0
- Podiums: 0
- Career points: 3
- Pole positions: 0
- Fastest laps: 0
- First entry: 1950 British Grand Prix
- Last entry: 1952 French Grand Prix

Champ Car career
- 1 race run over 1 year
- Best finish: 23rd (tie) (1936)
- First race: 1936 Vanderbilt Cup (Westbury)
Wins	Podiums	Poles
0	0	0

24 Hours of Le Mans career
- Years: 1934, 1938
- Teams: Chinetti
- Best finish: 1st (1934)
- Class wins: 1 (1934)

Philippe Jean Armand Étancelin (French pronunciation: [fi.lip ʒɑ̃ aʁ.mɑ̃ e.tɑ̃.slɛ̃]; 28 December 1896 – 13 October 1981) was a French racing driver, and a winner of the 1934 24 Hours of Le Mans. He competed primarily on the Grand Prix circuit, and was an early Formula One driver.

== Biography ==
Born in Rouen, Seine-Inférieure, in Normandy, Étancelin worked as a merchant in the winter and raced cars during the summer.

Étancelin's wife, Suzanne, served as his crew chief. Their three children were placed in a school in Rouen while the couple traveled to races around the world. Suzanne communicated with Étancelin through French sign language as he raced around the speedway. Suzanne told a reporter Étancelin bought a racing car to celebrate the birth of their second child, Jeanne Alice. He did not intend to race the car but merely use it for pleasure driving around the countryside. The couple once drove it up to a speed of 125 mph (201 km/h). After two years of recreational motoring, Étancelin decided to enter a race.

Étancelin began racing a privateer Bugatti in 1926, entering local events and hillclimbs. His first victory was the Grand Prix de la Marne at Reims in 1927, the same year he recorded a third at the Coppa Florio in Saint-Brieuc. He repeated his victory at Reims in 1929, ahead of Zenelli and friend Marcel Lehoux, making a Bugatti sweep of the podium. Étancelin took a victory at the Grand Prix de la Baule and the Antibes Prix de Conseil General.

Nicknamed "Phi Phi", Étancelin also earned Bugatti a win at the 1930 Algerian Grand Prix, followed home by Lehoux. At the Formula Libre French Grand Prix, he defeated Henry Birkin's Bentley, and won the Grenoble Circuit de Dauphine, with a third at Lyons.

Étancelin began the 1931 season in a Bugatti, placing behind Czaykowski at the Casablanca Grand Prix at Anfa. He won the Circuit d'Esterel Plage at Saint-Raphaël. For major events, run to Formula Libre rules to a 10-hour duration, he shared with Lehoux. They dropped out of both the Italian and French Grands Prix. After Étancelin switched to Alfa later in the year, he came fourth in the Marne Grand Prix and won the four-hour Dieppe Grand Prix, ahead of Czaykowski's Bugatti and Earl Howe's Delage. He added wins at Grenoble and the Comminges Grand Prix at St. Gaudens.

While Étancelin was a top privateer, he was consistently beaten by works teams in 1932, earning only one win, the Picardy Grand Prix at Peronne.

In 1933, Étancelin's Alfa narrowly lost the 19th annual French Grand Prix (organized by the French Automobile Club at the Montlhery Autodrome near Paris) following a "furious" contest with Giuseppe Campari's Maserati, losing the lead on the final lap of the 500 km (310 mi) event. Nevertheless, Étancelin won a second consecutive Picardy Grand Prix, over a "formidable" Raymond Sommer, and placed second to an equally formidable Tazio Nuvolari at the Nîmes Grand Prix, with a win over Jean-Pierre Wimille at the Marne Grand Prix.

The new 750 kilogram formula brought the conquering Silver Arrows of Mercedes and Auto Union. Étancelin switched to a Maserati 8CM, earning second places at Casablanca, Montreux, and Nice, with a win at Dieppe. He shared an Alfa with Luigi Chinetti to win Le Mans.

Étancelin's 1935 season was no better, with only a third at Tunis. He gave Rudolf Caracciola's Mercedes a tough fight at Monaco in the little 3.7 litre Maserati, but suffered brake fade and came fourth. Driving a Maserati for the Subalpina team, he also had a spectacular accident at the Swiss Grand Prix in Bern, with his car upturned and in flames, but he did not suffer injuries.

Entering one of the new 4.4 liter Maseratis in 1936, he was outmatched by the German entrants, suffering retirements in nearly every contest. He won only the Pau Grand Prix, and that was "against modest opposition". He negotiated the 100 laps in 3 hours 21 minutes 22 seconds. In October, Étancelin qualified sixth for the Vanderbilt Cup, which was run over 300 mi (480 km) near Westbury, New York, after a 20 mi (32 km) qualifier at Roosevelt Raceway in Long Island. He finished the AAA-sanctioned race in ninth.

Étancelin stayed out of racing in 1937, returning in 1938 solely to share a new Talbot with Chinetti at LeMans, but did not score a win. For 1939, he put his Talbot third at Pau, following Hermann Lang and Manfred von Brauchitsch home. He also scored a fourth place at the French Grand Prix.

Étancelin would enter the first motor race held in France postwar, failing to finish at the Bois de Boulogne in an Alfa. He was not able to obtain one of the scarce new racers until 1948, when he purchased a 4½ litre Talbot, and put it second at the Albi Grand Prix, behind Luigi Villoresi in the Maserati.

Étancelin's 1949 season saw second places at the Marseilles Grand Prix (to Fangio), the European Grand Prix at Monza (to Alberto Ascari), and Czechoslovakian Grand Prix at Brno (to Peter Whitehead in a Ferrari). In addition, he won the Paris Grand Prix at Montlhéry.

Étancelin participated in twelve World Championship Formula One Grands Prix, debuting on 13 May 1950. He scored a total of three championship points. His fifth place in the 1950 Italian Grand Prix made him the oldest driver ever to score championship points, a record set in the first World Championship season which still stands more than 75 years later.

In 1953, Étancelin ran third at the Rouen Grand Prix and at the 12 Hours of Casablanca, and decided to retire. The government of France awarded him the Legion of Honour in recognition of his contribution to the sport of automobile racing that spanned four decades.

Étancelin retained an interest in racing, making occasional appearances in historic racing through 1974.

Étancelin died at Neuilly-sur-Seine in 1981.

== Motorsports career results ==
=== Notable career wins ===
- Algerian Grand Prix 1930
- Grand Prix de la Baule 1929
- Grand Prix du Comminges 1929, 1931
- Dauphiné Circuit 1930, 1931
- French Grand Prix 1930
- Grand Prix de Dieppe 1931
- Grand Prix de la Marne 1929, 1933
- Pau Grand Prix 1930, 1936
- Grand Prix de Picardie 1932, 1933
- Grand Prix de Reims 1927, 1929
- Circuit d'Esterel Plage 1931
- 24 hours of Le Mans 1934

=== European Championship results ===
(key) (Races in bold indicate pole position) (Races in italics indicate fastest lap)

Year	Entrant	Chassis	Engine	1	2	3	4	5	6	7	EDC	Pts
1931	M. Lehoux	Bugatti T51	Bugatti 2.3 L8	ITA; Ret	FRA; Ret	BEL					24th	21
1932	M. Lehoux	Alfa Romeo Monza	Alfa Romeo 2.3 L8	ITA	FRA; Ret	GER					16th	21
1935	Scuderia Subalpina	Maserati 6C-34	Maserati 3.7 L6	MON; 4	FRA	BEL		SUI; Ret			13th	46
1935	Scuderia Subalpina	Maserati 6C-34	Maserati 3.3 L6				GER; Ret				13th	46
1935	Scuderia Subalpina	Maserati V8RI	Maserati 4.8 V8						ITA; Ret	ESP	13th	46
1936	P. Etancelin	Maserati V8RI	Maserati 4.8 V8	MON; Ret	GER	SUI; Ret	ITA				18th	28
1938	Talbot Darracq	Talbot T150C	Talbot 4.5 L6	FRA; Ret	GER	SUI	ITA				24th	29
1939	Automobiles Talbot-Darracq	Talbot MD	Talbot 4.5 L6	BEL	FRA; 4	GER	SUI				16th	28

=== Post-WWII Grandes Épreuves results ===
(key) (Races in bold indicate pole position; races in italics indicate fastest lap)

Year	Entrant	Chassis	Engine	1	2	3	4	5
1948	Philippe Étancelin	Talbot-Lago T26C	Talbot 23CV 4.5 L6	MON	SUI	FRA; Ret	ITA; 8	
1949	Philippe Étancelin	Talbot-Lago T26C	Talbot 23CV 4.5 L6	GBR; 5		SUI; 4	FRA; Ret	ITA; 2
1949	Automobiles Talbot-Darracq	Talbot-Lago T26C	Talbot 23CV 4.5 L6		BEL; Ret			

=== FIA World Drivers' Championship results ===
(key)

Year	Entrant	Chassis	Engine	1	2	3	4	5	6	7	8	WDC	Pts
1950	Philippe Étancelin	Talbot-Lago T26C	Talbot 23CV 4.5 L6	GBR; 8	MON; Ret	500	SUI; Ret			ITA; 5		18th	3
1950	Automobiles Talbot-Darracq	Talbot-Lago T26C-DA	Talbot 23CV 4.5 L6					BEL; Ret				18th	3
1950	Philippe Étancelin	Talbot-Lago T26C-DA	Talbot 23CV 4.5 L6						FRA; 5^{†}			18th	3
1951	Philippe Étancelin	Talbot-Lago T26C-DA	Talbot 23CV 4.5 L6	SUI; 10	500	BEL; Ret	FRA; Ret	GBR	GER; Ret	ITA	ESP; 8	NC	0
1952	Escuderia Bandeirantes	Maserati A6GCM	Maserati A6 2.0 L6	SUI	500	BEL	FRA; 8	GBR	GER	NED	ITA	NC	0

^{†} Indicates shared drive with Eugène Chaboud

=== 24 Hours of Le Mans results ===
Year	Team	Co-Drivers	Car	Class	Laps	Pos.	Class Pos.
1934	(Italy) Luigi Chinetti	(Italy) Luigi Chinetti	Alfa Romeo 8C 2300	3.0	213	**1st**	**1st**
1938	(Italy) Luigi Chinetti	(Italy) Luigi Chinetti	Talbot T26	5.0	66	DNF	DNF

Sporting positions
Preceded by Raymond Sommer; Tazio Nuvolari	Winner of the 24 Hours of Le Mans; 1934; With: Luigi Chinetti	Succeeded by Johnny Hindmarsh; Luis Fontés
