= Carlo Felice Trossi =

Italian racing driver (1908–1949)

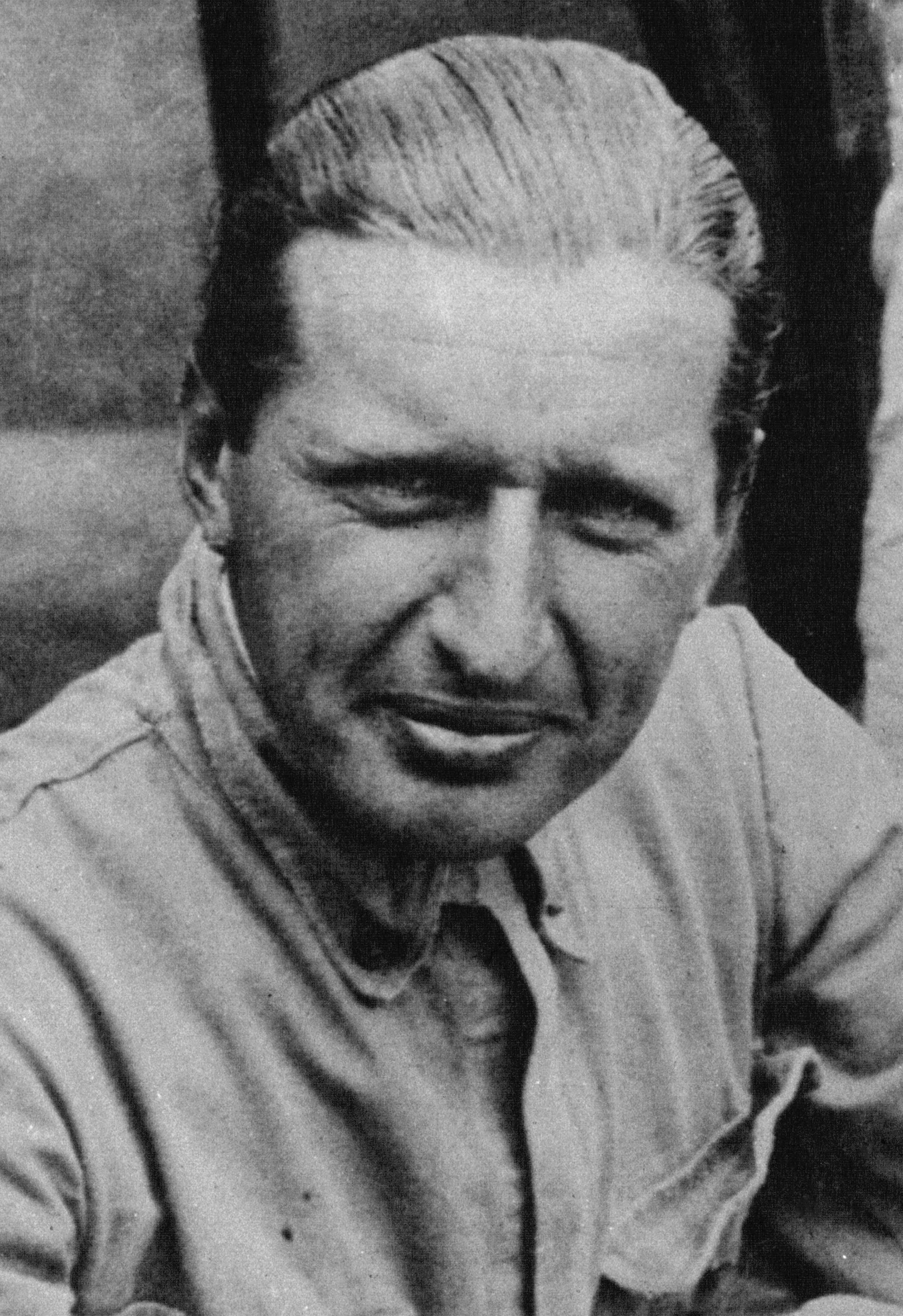
- Trossi in 1934
- Born: Carlo Felice Trossi; 27 April 1908 Gaglianico, Piedmont, Italy
- Died: 9 May 1949 (aged 41) Milan, Lombardy, Italy

Count Carlo Felice Trossi di Pian Villar (27 April 1908 – 9 May 1949) was an Italian racing driver and auto constructor.

== Racing career ==
During Trossi's career, he raced for three different teams: Mercedes-Benz, Alfa Romeo and, briefly, Maserati. He won the 1947 Italian Grand Prix and the 1948 Swiss Grand Prix. He relieved playboy-driver Frederick McEvoy for 51 laps of the 75-lap 1936 Vanderbilt Cup; while the Australian started and finished the race, Trossi earned more points than him under the mileage-based AAA points system.

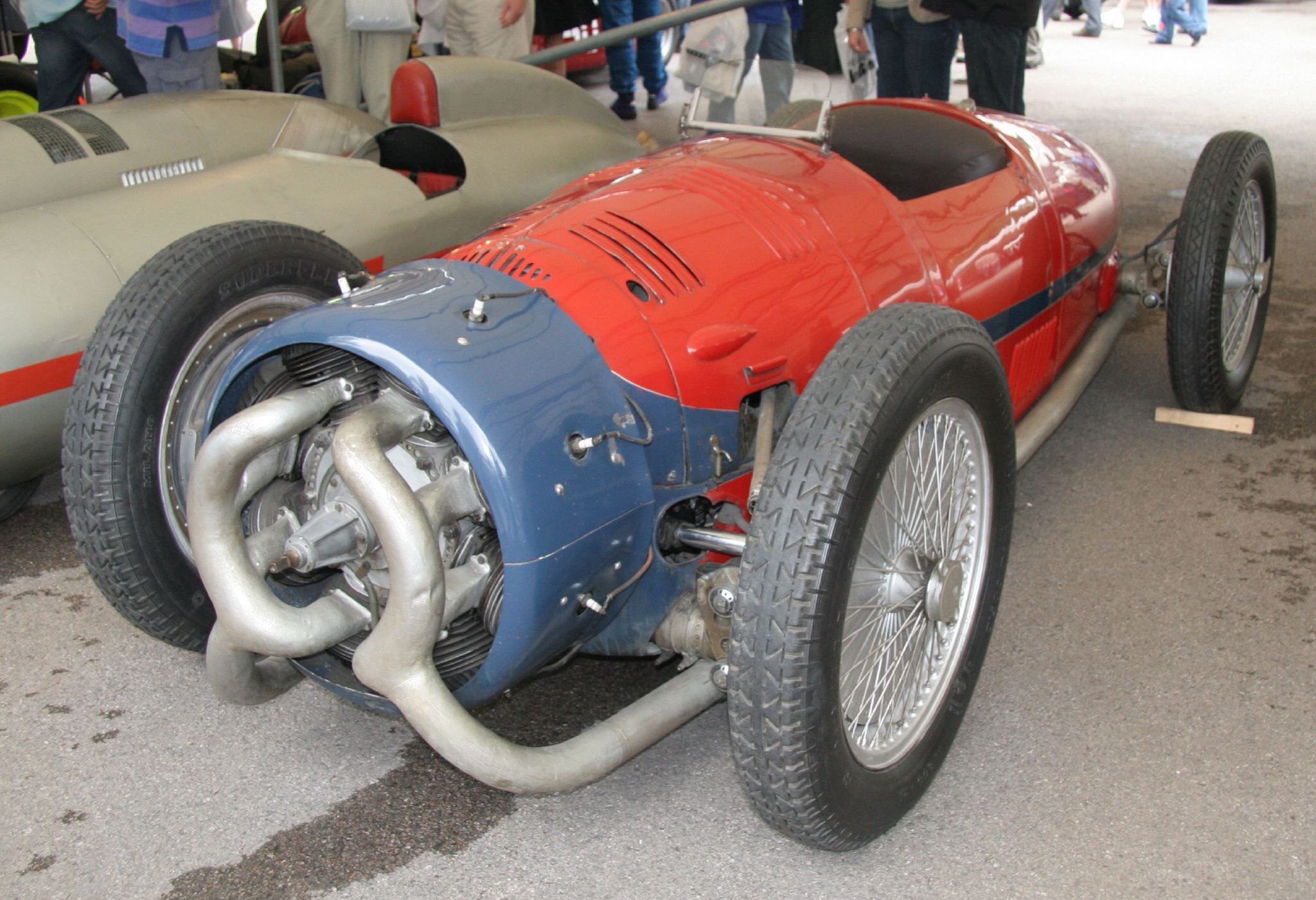
The 1935 Trossi-Monaco, often on display at the Museo Nazionale dell'Automobile

Trossi backed one of the most unusual Grand Prix cars, the Trossi-Monaco of 1935. It featured a 16-cylinder, two-stroke cycle, two-row radial, air-cooled engine and an aircraft-like body designed by Augusto Monaco. The car was a spectacular failure and never raced in a Grand Prix event.

Trossi had many hobbies: racing boats and airplanes in addition to cars. He was also the president of the Scuderia Ferrari in 1932.

Enzo Ferrari said of Trossi: "He was a great racer but never wanted to make the effort to reach a dominant position and I remember him with emotion since he was one of the first to believe in my scuderia of which he was a part".

== Personal life ==
Trossi was born in Gaglianico, Italy. He died of a brain tumor in Milan at 41 years of age.

== Motorsports career results ==
=== European Championship results ===
(key) (Races in bold indicate pole position; races in italics indicate fastest lap)

Year	Entrant	Chassis	Engine	1	2	3	4	5	6	7	EDC	Pts
1935	Scuderia Ferrari	Alfa Romeo Tipo B/P3	Alfa Romeo 3.2 L8s	MON; Ret^{1}	FRA	BEL	GER	SUI	ITA	ESP	—^{1}	
1936	Scuderia Torino	Maserati V8RI	Maserati 4.8 V8s	MON; Ret			ITA; 7				7th	23
1936	Scuderia Torino	Maserati 4C 2500	Maserati 2.5 L4s		GER; 8	SUI					7th	23
1937	Scuderia Ferrari	Alfa Romeo 12C-36	Alfa Romeo 4.1 V12s	BEL; Ret	GER	MON	SUI	ITA; 8			17th	35
1938	Officine A. Maserati	Maserati 8CTF	Maserati 3.0 L8s	FRA	GER	SUI	ITA; DSQ				36th	32

Notes

- **^1** – As a co-driver Trossi was ineligible for championship points

=== Post-WWII Grandes Épreuves results ===
(key) (Races in bold indicate pole position; races in italics indicate fastest lap)

Year	Entrant	Chassis	Engine	1	2	3	4
1947	Alfa Corse	Alfa Romeo 158	Alfa Romeo 158 1.5 L8s	SUI; 3	BEL; 3	ITA; 1	FRA
1948	Alfa Corse	Alfa Romeo 158	Alfa Romeo 158 1.5 L8s	MON	SUI; 1	FRA	ITA; Ret

Sporting achievements
Preceded by Rudolf Caracciola	European Hill Climb Champion (for Racing Cars); 1933	Succeeded by Xavier Perrot (1972)
