= CTA-Arsenal =

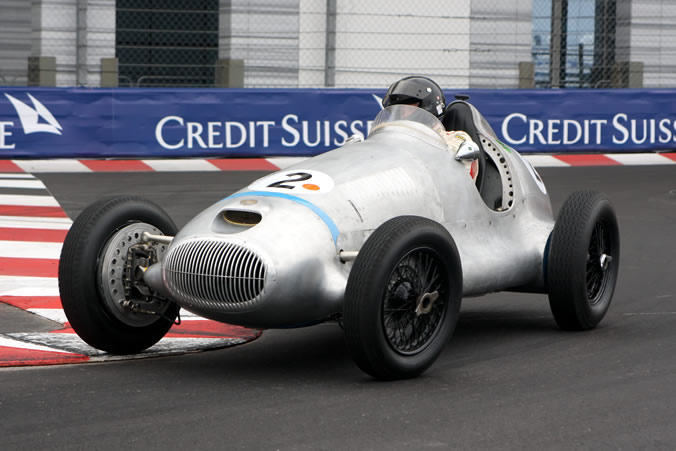
CTA-Arsenal at the 2010 Monaco Grand Prix for historical cars

The CTA-Arsenal is a French racing car which was developed by the Centre for the study of car and cycle technology then abbreviated as CTA but today renamed as the UTAC and constructed by Arsenal at Châtillon. Two cars were eventually built. The car was intended as the French "national single seat racing car" to compete against Alfa Romeo but the project was abandoned because the car proved incapable of finishing the races in which it was scheduled to appear.

== Origins ==
In 1945 Raymond Sommer, who had won the Le Mans 24 Hour Race in 1932 and 1933, informed the engineers at the CTA about his project to construct a racing car that could represent France in motor races. He persuaded Marcel Paul, the industry minister, to release government funds in order that the CTA might work on the project.

Albert Lory, who had built his reputation with Delage in the 1920s, was placed in charge of the project team, but he only took responsibility for the engine, being highly critical of the chassis and suspension design which he, along with independent commentators, regarded as the car's weak spot.

In 1947 the car was entered for the French Grand Prix, and the race, run that year at Lyon, was postponed till 21 September to enable it to compete. Unfortunately the transmission broke on the start line, and the record shows that it was placed last after completing zero laps. Nevertheless, the next year the CTA-Arsenal team returned to the fray, now with two cars built. It was scheduled to feature in the French Grand Prix, run at Rheims in July 1948, but had to withdraw at the last minute. The race was won by an Alfa Romeo.

The car made its second and final race appearance in 1949 before the project was abandoned and the project team leader, Albert Lory, joined Renault as the director responsible for research.

== Technical ==
Lory designed a high performance 1 482 cc V8 engine incorporating four overhead camshafts and two Roots compressors. This unit initially provided 215 hp at 6,000 rpm. By 1948 the engine had been modified to produce a maximum of 275 hp at 8,000 rpm. However, it was matched to a transmission system that one commentator described as "delicate".

The chassis employed independent suspension with longitudinal torsion bars at the front and lateral torsion bars at the rear, with wheels mounted on "silent blocks" that permitted vertical movement. The road holding provided by this combination was reported to be catastrophic. Stopping power came from hydraulically controlled drum brakes and the car sat on Rudge-Whitworth spoked wheels.

== See also ==
UTAC (French)
