= Toulo de Graffenried =

Swiss racing driver (1914–2007)

Emmanuel de Graffenried
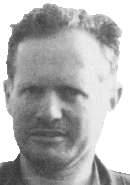
- Born: 18 May 1914; Paris, France
- Died: 22 January 2007 (aged 92); Lonay, Vaud, Switzerland

Formula One World Championship career
- Nationality: (Switzerland) Swiss
- Active years: 1950–1954, 1956
- Team(s): Maserati, Alfa Romeo
- Entries: 23 (22 starts)
- Championships: 0
- Wins: 0
- Podiums: 0
- Career points: 9
- Pole positions: 0
- Fastest laps: 0
- First entry: 1950 British Grand Prix
- Last entry: 1956 Italian Grand Prix

Baron Emmanuel Leo Ludwig 'Toulo' de Graffenried (18 May 1914, Paris, France – 22 January 2007, Lonay, Switzerland) was a Swiss motor racing driver. He participated in 23 World Championship Grands Prix, debuting on 13 May 1950, and scored a total of nine championship points. He also participated in numerous non-Championship Formula One races.

== Career ==
De Graffenried was born in Paris, the son of Swiss Baron Leo de Graffenried and his American wife Irma Stern. He began his racing career in 1936, driving his own Maserati voiturette. Some of his most memorable results came at his home track: the challenging, cobbled, street circuit at Bremgarten near Bern. He won the 1949 British Grand Prix, a year before the FIA World Championship began. In that inaugural year, de Graffenried contested four of the season's seven races, with mixed results. He continued to drive in occasional races over the next six years, with his best finish being fourth place at the 1953 Belgian Grand Prix.

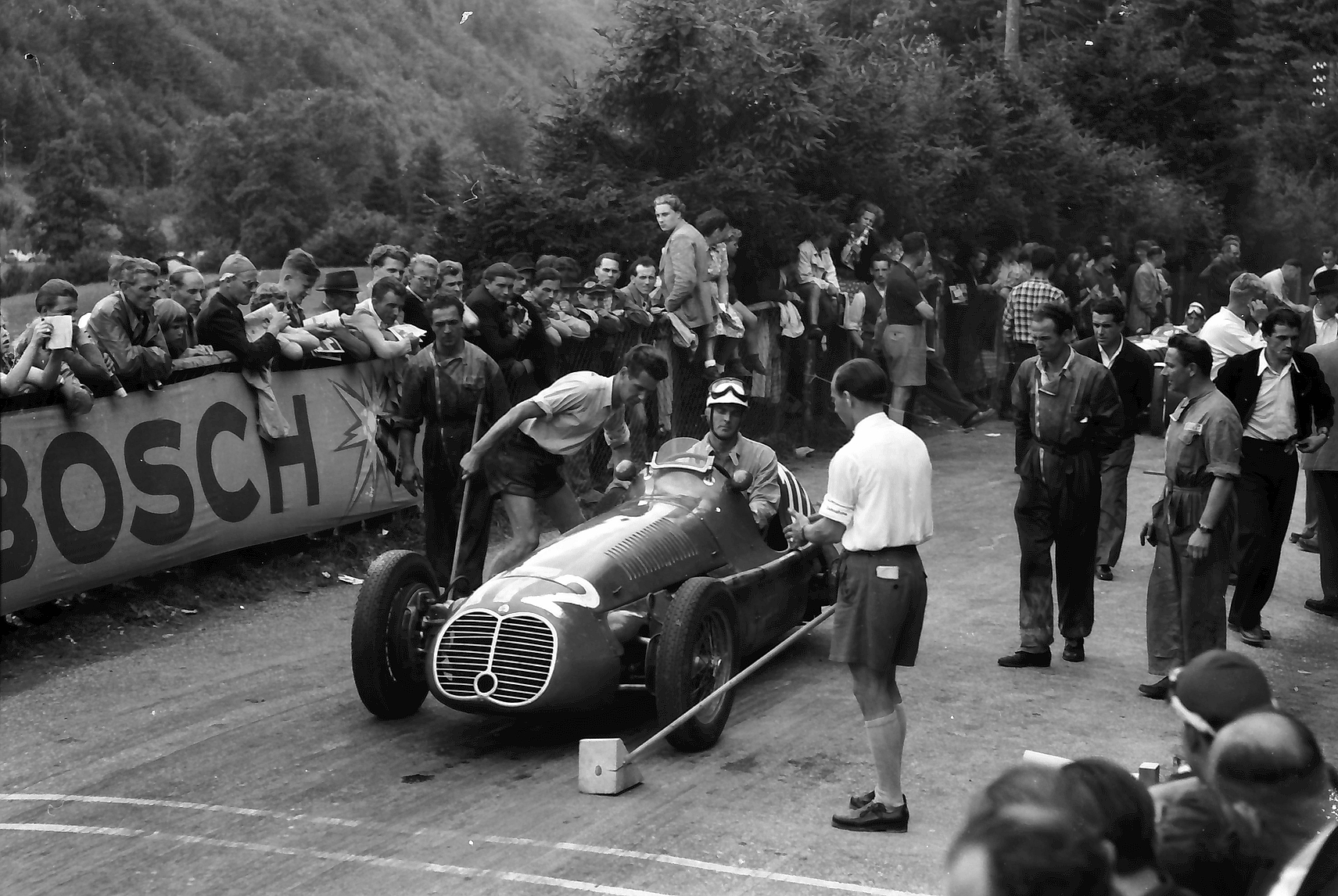
De Graffenried in a Maserati 4CLT at the 1951 Schauinsland hillclimb

Following his retirement from racing, de Graffenried managed his car dealership in Lausanne, featuring Alfa Romeo, Rolls-Royce and Ferrari automobiles. He also acted as stunt double for Kirk Douglas during the filming of The Racers. Later, he became a common figure at Formula One events during the 1970s and 1980s, as the corporate ambassador for Phillip Morris' Marlboro cigarette brand.

In recognition of his win at the first British Grand Prix, de Graffenried made his last appearance at the wheel of a racing car during the 1998 celebrations of Silverstone's 50th anniversary at age 84.

De Graffenried was the last surviving driver to have competed in the first World Championship Formula One Grand Prix.

== Racing record ==
=== Complete European Championship results ===
(key) (Races in bold indicate pole position; races in italics indicate fastest lap)

Year	Entrant	Chassis	Engine	1	2	3	4	EDC	Pts
1938	Baron de Graffenried	Maserati 6C-34	Maserati 3.0 L6	FRA	GER; Ret			31st	31
1938	Ecurie Du Puy de Graffenried	Maserati 6C-34	Maserati 3.0 L6			SUI; DNS	ITA	31st	31
1939	Baron de Graffenried	Maserati 6C-34	Maserati 3.0 L6	BEL	FRA	GER	SUI; Ret	25th	29

=== Post WWII Grandes Épreuves results ===
(key) (Races in bold indicate pole position; races in italics indicate fastest lap)

Year	Entrant	Chassis	Engine	1	2	3	4	5
1947	Emmanuel de Graffenried	Maserati 4CL	Maserati 4CL 1.5 L4s	SUI; 9	BEL; Ret	ITA; Ret		
1947	Enrico Platé	Maserati 4CL	Maserati 4CL 1.5 L4s				FRA; Ret	
1948	Enrico Platé	Maserati 4CL	Maserati 4CL 1.5 L4s	MON; 3	SUI; Ret	FRA; Ret	ITA; 9	
1949	Emmanuel de Graffenried	Maserati 4CLT/48	Maserati 4CLT 1.5 L4s	GBR; 1	BEL	SUI; 7	FRA	
1949	Enrico Platé	Maserati 4CLT/48	Maserati 4CLT 1.5 L4s					ITA; 4

=== Complete Formula One World Championship results ===
(key) (Races in bold indicate pole position; races in italics indicate fastest lap)

Year	Entrant	Chassis	Engine	1	2	3	4	5	6	7	8	9	WDC	Pts
1950	Enrico Platé	Maserati 4CLT/48	Maserati 4CLT 1.5 L4s	GBR; Ret	MON; Ret	500	SUI; 6	BEL	FRA	ITA; 6			NC	0
1951	SA Alfa Romeo	Alfa Romeo 159	Alfa Romeo 158 1.5 L8s	SUI; 5	500	BEL				ITA; Ret	ESP; 6		16th	2
1951	Enrico Platé	Maserati 4CLT/48	Maserati 4CLT 1.5 L4s				FRA; Ret	GBR	GER; Ret				16th	2
1952	Enrico Platé	Maserati 4CLT/48	Platé 2.0 L4	SUI; 6	500	BEL	FRA; Ret	GBR; 19	GER	NED	ITA; DNQ		NC	0
1953	Enrico Platé	Maserati A6GCM	Maserati A6 2.0 L6	ARG	500	NED; 5							8th	7
1953	Emmanuel de Graffenried	Maserati A6GCM	Maserati A6 2.0 L6				BEL; 4	FRA; 7	GBR; Ret	GER; 5	SUI; Ret	ITA; Ret	8th	7
1954	Emmanuel de Graffenried	Maserati A6GCM	Maserati A6 2.0 L6	ARG; 8	500	BEL	FRA	GBR	GER	SUI	ITA	ESP; Ret	NC	0
1956	Scuderia Centro Sud	Maserati 250F	Maserati 250F1 2.5 L6	ARG	MON	500	BEL	FRA	GBR	GER	ITA; 7		NC	0
