= Raymond Sommer =

French racing driver (1906–1950)

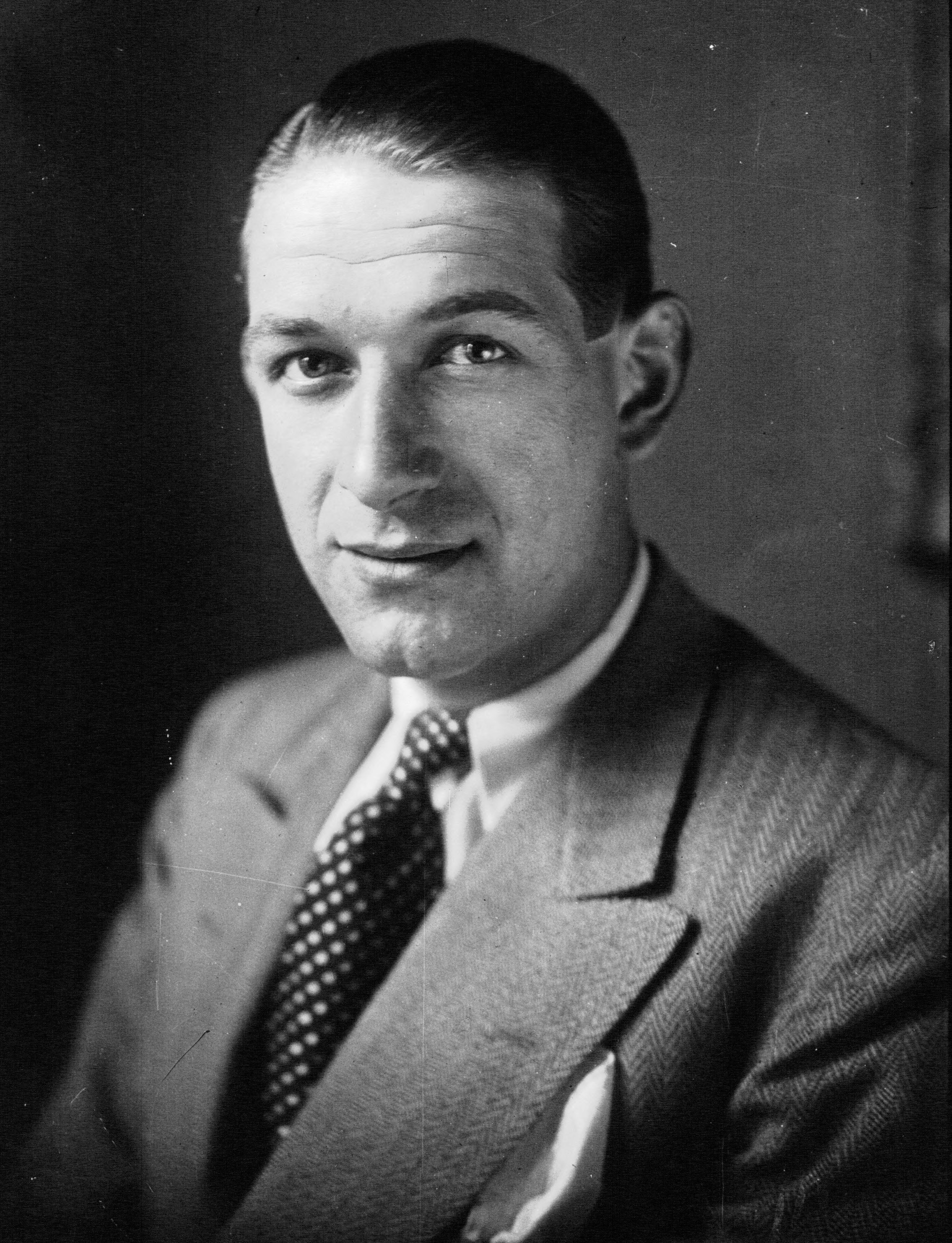
- Sommer in 1932
- Born: Pierre Raymond Sommer; 31 August 1906 Mouzon, Ardennes, France
- Died: 10 September 1950 (aged 44) Cadours, Haute-Garonne, France

Championship titles
- Major victories 24 Hours of Le Mans (1932, 1933)

Formula One World Championship career
- Nationality: (France) French
- Active years: 1950
- Team(s): Ferrari, Talbot-Lago (works and non-works)
- Entries: 5
- Championships: 0
- Wins: 0
- Podiums: 0
- Career points: 3
- Pole positions: 0
- Fastest laps: 0
- First entry: 1950 Monaco Grand Prix
- Last entry: 1950 Italian Grand Prix

Champ Car career
- 1 race run over 1 year
- Best finish: 10th (1936)
- First race: 1936 Vanderbilt Cup (Westbury)
Wins	Podiums	Poles
0	0	0

24 Hours of Le Mans career
- Years: 1931–1935, 1937–1939, 1950
- Teams: de Costier, privateer, Chinetti
- Best finish: 1st (1932, 1933)
- Class wins: 2 (1932, 1933)

Pierre Raymond Sommer (31 August 1906 – 10 September 1950) was a French racing driver. He raced both before and after WWII with some success, particularly in endurance racing. He won the 24 Hours of Le Mans endurance race in both 1932 and 1933, and although he did not reach the finishing line in any subsequent appearance at the Le Mans, he did lead each event until 1938. Sommer was also competitive at the highest level in Grand Prix motor racing, but did not win a race. He won the French Grand Prix in 1936, but the event that year was run as a sports car race.

After European racing resumed in the late 1940s, Sommer again won a number of sports car and minor Grand Prix events, and finished in fourth place in the 1950 Monaco Grand Prix, the second round of the newly-instituted Formula One World Drivers' Championship. He was killed toward the end of 1950, when his car overturned during a race at the Circuit de Cadours.

== Biography ==
Sommer was born in Mouzon in France, to a wealthy Sedan carpet-making family. His father, Roger Sommer, broke the Wright Brothers' record for the longest flight in 1909. It was not until 1931 that Raymond started to display daredevil tendencies of his own, entering motor races in a privateer Chrysler Imperial. The following year, he won the 24 Hours of Le Mans race, despite having to drive over 20 hours solo after his teammate, Luigi Chinetti, retired ill. During the 1930s, Sommer was to dominate the French endurance classic, winning again in 1933 driving an Alfa Romeo alongside Tazio Nuvolari. He also led every race until 1938, only to suffer a mechanical failure, once when 12 laps in the lead. Sommer traveled to Long Island, New York, to compete in the 1936 Vanderbilt Cup where he finished fourth behind the winner, Nuvolari.

Although a regular top-ten finisher in Grands Épreuves Sommer never won a race. At the time, the German manufacturers Mercedes-Benz and Auto Union were the dominant force in Grand Prix racing, together with the French Bugatti team. Sommer turned to sports cars once more, and in 1936 he won the French Grand Prix with Jean-Pierre Wimille, and the Spa 24 Hours endurance race with co-driver Francesco Severi. More wins came his way including at the "Marseilles Three Hours" at Miramas, the Grand Prix de Tunisie and La Turbie hill climb competition in 1938 and 1939 with Alfa Romeo 308 until the outbreak of World War II, where he played an active part in the French Resistance movement.

Following the war, Sommer claimed victory in the 1946 René Le Bègue Cup race at Saint-Cloud. At the 1947 Turin Grand Prix in Valentino Park he won the first ever Grand Prix for Enzo Ferrari as an independent constructor. The following season, Sommer switched from the Ferrari team, again for a privately owned car, this time a Talbot-Lago. In 1950, the Formula One World Championship began and Sommer drove in two Grand Prix races for Ferrari and three in a privately entered Talbot-Lago, retiring in all but one.

In July 1950, Sommer won the Aix les Bains Circuit du Lac Grand Prix with a Ferrari 166.

On 10 September 1950, Sommer entered the Grand Prix of the Haute-Garonne near Cadours, France in the British Racing Motors 1100cc Cooper. Sommer led the race on lap nine when he was overtaking a slower car that was two laps down. Witnesses stated that the car had a rear wheel start to come apart from its hub. Sommer looked at the wheel, where he lost control of his Cooper and begin to roll over. He barrel rolled twice and landed in a ditch near the track, where it catapulted into a tree. While alive after the accident, Sommer died a few minutes after with first responders present. He was found to have a fractured skull.

== Motorsports career results ==
=== Notable career wins ===
- French Grand Prix 1936
- Grand Prix de Marseilles 1932, 1937, 1946
- Grand Prix de Tunisie 1937
- Grand Prix de L'U.M.F. 1935
- Gran Premio del Valentino 1947
- Madrid Grand Prix 1949
- Spa 24 Hours 1936
- Turin Grand Prix 1947
- 24 Hours of Le Mans 1932, 1933

=== European Championship results ===
(key) (Races in bold indicate pole position) (Races in italics indicate fastest lap)

Year	Entrant	Chassis	Engine	1	2	3	4	5	6	7	EDC	Pts
1935	R. Sommer	Alfa Romeo Tipo B/P3	Alfa Romeo 2.9 L8	MON; 6		BEL; Ret	GER				7th	39
1935	Scuderia Subalpina	Maserati 6C-34	Maserati 3.7 L8		FRA; 6						7th	39
1935	R. Sommer	Alfa Romeo Tipo B/P3	Alfa Romeo 3.2 L8					SUI; 9	ITA	ESP; 7	7th	39
1936	R. Sommer	Alfa Romeo Tipo B/P3	Alfa Romeo 3.2 L8	MON; 7	GER; 9	SUI; Ret	ITA				5th	21
1937	Scuderia Ferrari	Alfa Romeo 12C-36	Alfa Romeo 4.1 V12	**BEL**; 5			SUI; 8	ITA			6th	27
1937	R. Sommer	Alfa Romeo 8C-35	Alfa Romeo 3.8 L8		GER; Ret	MON; 7					6th	27
1939	R. Sommer	Alfa Romeo Tipo 308	Alfa Romeo 3.0 L8	BEL; 4	FRA; 5	GER; Ret	SUI				9th	23

=== Post-WWII Grandes Épreuves results ===
(key) (Races in bold indicate pole position; races in italics indicate fastest lap)

Year	Entrant	Chassis	Engine	1	2	3	4	5
1947	Scuderia Milano	Maserati 4CL	Maserati 4CL 1.5 L4s	SUI; 4				
1947	Raymond Sommer	Maserati 4CM	Maserati 4CL 1.5 L4s		BEL; Ret			
1947	Raymond Sommer	Maserati 4CL	Maserati 4CL 1.5 L4s			ITA; Ret		
1947	Raymond Sommer	CTA-Arsenal	CTA-Arsenal 1.5 V8s				FRA; Ret	
1948	Equipe Gordini	Simca Gordini T15	Simca-Gordini 15C 1.5 L4s	MON; Ret	SUI; Ret			
1948	Centre d'Etudes T.A.	Maserati 4CM	Maserati 4CL 1.5 L4s			FRA; Ret		
1948	Scuderia Ferrari	Ferrari 125	Ferrari 125 F1 1.5 V12s				ITA; 3	
1949	Raymond Sommer	Talbot-Lago T26C	Talbot 23CV 4.5 L6	GBR	BEL	SUI; 3	FRA; 5	
1949	Scuderia Ferrari	Ferrari 125	Ferrari 125 F1 1.5 V12s					ITA; 5

=== FIA World Drivers' Championship results ===
(key) (Races in bold indicate pole position) (Races in italics indicate fastest lap)

Year	Entrant	Chassis	Engine	1	2	3	4	5	6	7	WDC	Pts
1950	Scuderia Ferrari	Ferrari 125	Ferrari 125 1.5 V12s	GBR	MON; 4	500					16th	3
1950	Scuderia Ferrari	Ferrari 166 F2	Ferrari 166 2.0 V12				SUI; Ret				16th	3
1950	Raymond Sommer	Talbot-Lago T26C	Talbot 23CV 4.5 L6					BEL; Ret		ITA; Ret	16th	3
1950	Automobiles Talbot-Darracq SA	Talbot-Lago T26C-GS	Talbot 23CV 4.5 L6						FRA; Ret		16th	3

=== Formula One non-championship results ===
(key) (Races in bold indicate pole position)(Races in italics indicate fastest lap)

Year	Entrant	Chassis	Engine	1	2	3	4	5	6	7	8	9	10	11	12	13	14	15	16	17
1950	Scuderia Ferrari	Ferrari 125	Ferrari 125 1.5 V12s	PAU; 4	RIC	SRM; Ret														
1950	Raymond Sommer	Talbot-Lago T26C	Talbot 23CV 4.5 L6				PAR; Ret	EMP	BAR	JER	ALB; Ret		NAT; Ret	NOT	ULS	PES	STT			
1950	Automobiles Talbot-Darracq SA	Talbot-Lago T26C-DA	Talbot 23CV 4.5 L6									**NED**; Ret								
1950	BRM Ltd	BRM P15	BRM P15 1.5 V16s															INT; Ret	GOO	PEN

=== 24 Hours of Le Mans results ===
Year	Team	Co-Drivers	Car	Class	Laps	Pos.	Class Pos.
1931	(France) H. de Costier (private entrant)	(France) Jean Delemer	Chrysler 80	5.0	14	DNF (Radiator)	
1932	(France) Raymond Sommer	(Italy) Luigi Chinetti	Alfa Romeo 8C 2300LM	3.0	218	**1st**	**1st**
1933	(France) Raymond Sommer	(Italy) Tazio Nuvolari	Alfa Romeo 8C 2300MM	3.0	233	**1st**	**1st**
1934	(France) Raymond Sommer	(France) Dr. Pierre Félix	Alfa Romeo 8C 2300	3.0	14	DNF	
1935	(France) Raymond Sommer	(France) Raymond de Saugé Desttrez	Alfa Romeo 8C 2300	3.0	69	DNF	
1937	(France) Raymond Sommer	(Italy) Giovanni Battista Guidotti	Alfa Romeo 8C 2900A Spider	5.0	11	DNF	
1938	(France) Raymond Sommer	(Italy) Clemente Biondetti	Alfa Romeo 8C 2900B Touring	5.0	219	DNF	
1939	(France) Raymond Sommer	(Thailand) Prince Bira	Alfa Romeo 6C 2500SS	3.0	173	DNF (Engine)	
1950	(United States) Luigi Chinetti	(Italy) Dorino Serafini	Ferrari 195S Coupé	S 3.0	82	DNF (Electrics)	

Sporting positions
Preceded by Earl Howe; Tim Birkin	Winner of the 24 Hours of Le Mans; 1932; With: Luigi Chinetti	Succeeded by Raymond Sommer; Tazio Nuvolari
Preceded by Raymond Sommer; Luigi Chinetti	Winner of the 24 Hours of Le Mans; 1933; With: Tazio Nuvolari	Succeeded by Luigi Chinetti; Philippe Étancelin
