= 1948 Italian Grand Prix =

Race details
- Date: 5 September 1948
- Official name: XVIII Gran Premio d'Italia
- Location: Valentino Park, Turin, Italy
- Course length: 4.801 km (2.983 miles)
- Distance: 75 laps, 360.080 km (223.744 miles)

Pole position
Driver	(France) Jean-Pierre Wimille	Alfa Romeo
- Time: 2:16.6

Fastest lap
Driver	(France) Jean-Pierre Wimille	Alfa Romeo
- Time: 2:22.4

Podium
First	(France) Jean-Pierre Wimille	Alfa Romeo
Second	(Italy) Luigi Villoresi	Maserati
Third	(France) Raymond Sommer	Ferrari

The 1948 Italian Grand Prix was a Grand Prix motor race held at Valentino Park in Turin, Italy on 5 September 1948. It was won by French driver Jean-Pierre Wimille in an Alfa Romeo 158.

== Classification ==
Pos	Driver	Constructor	Laps	Time/Retired	Grid
1	(France) Jean-Pierre Wimille	Alfa Romeo 158	75	3:10:42.4	1
2	(Italy) Luigi Villoresi	Maserati 4CLT/48	74	+ 1 lap	3
3	(France) Raymond Sommer	Ferrari 125	73	+ 2 laps	4
4	(Italy) Alberto Ascari	Maserati 4CLT/48	72	+ 3 laps	7
5	(United Kingdom) Reg Parnell	Maserati 4CLT/48	72	+ 3 laps	9
6	(France) Louis Rosier	Talbot-Lago T26C	70	+ 5 laps	14
7	(Italy) Franco Comotti	Talbot-Lago T26C	70	+ 5 laps	10
8	(France) Philippe Étancelin	Talbot-Lago T26C	69	+ 6 laps	16
9	(Switzerland) Emmanuel de Graffenried	Maserati 4CL	67	+ 8 laps	11
10	(France) Eugène Chaboud	Delahaye 135 S	67	+ 8 laps	20
11	(United Kingdom) Leslie Brooke	Maserati 4CLT/48	67	+ 8 laps	18
NC	(Thailand) B. Bira	Ferrari 125	66	+ 9 laps	15
Ret	(Italy) Carlo Felice Trossi (Italy) Consalvo Sanesi	Alfa Romeo 158	53	Supercharger	2
Ret	(Italy) Giuseppe Farina	Ferrari 125	51	Accident	6
Ret	(Italy) Consalvo Sanesi	Alfa Romeo 158	42	Accident	5
Ret	(Italy) Piero Taruffi	Maserati 4CL	41	Valve	13
Ret	(Monaco) Louis Chiron	Talbot-Lago T26	41	Cylinder head gasket	8
Ret	(France) Yves Giraud-Cabantous	Simca-Gordini T15	40	Engine	19
Ret	(Italy) Franco Cortese	Maserati 4CL	12	Engine	12
Ret	(France) Robert Manzon	Simca-Gordini T15	9	Engine	17
DNQ	(France) Charles Pozzi	Talbot-Lago T26SS		Did not qualify	
DNQ	(Italy) Nello Pagani	Maserati 4CL		Did not qualify	
DNQ	(Spain) Juan Jover	Maserati 4CL		Did not qualify	
DNQ	(Italy) Mario Lietti	Talbot-Darracq 700		Did not qualify	
DNQ	(Italy) Dioscoride Lanza	Maserati 4CL		Did not qualify	
DNQ	(Switzerland) Richard Ramseyer	Maserati 4CM		Did not qualify	
DNQ	(Spain) Paco Godia	Maserati 4CL		Did not qualify	
DNQ	(Italy) Lamberto Grolla	Stanguellini		Did not qualify	
DNP	(United States) John Gordon Bennett	ERA B-Type		Not present	

Grand Prix Race
Previous race: 1948 French Grand Prix	1948 Grand Prix season Grandes Épreuves	Next race: 1948 British Grand Prix
Previous race: 1947 Italian Grand Prix	Italian Grand Prix	Next race: 1949 Italian Grand Prix
