= 1949 French Grand Prix =

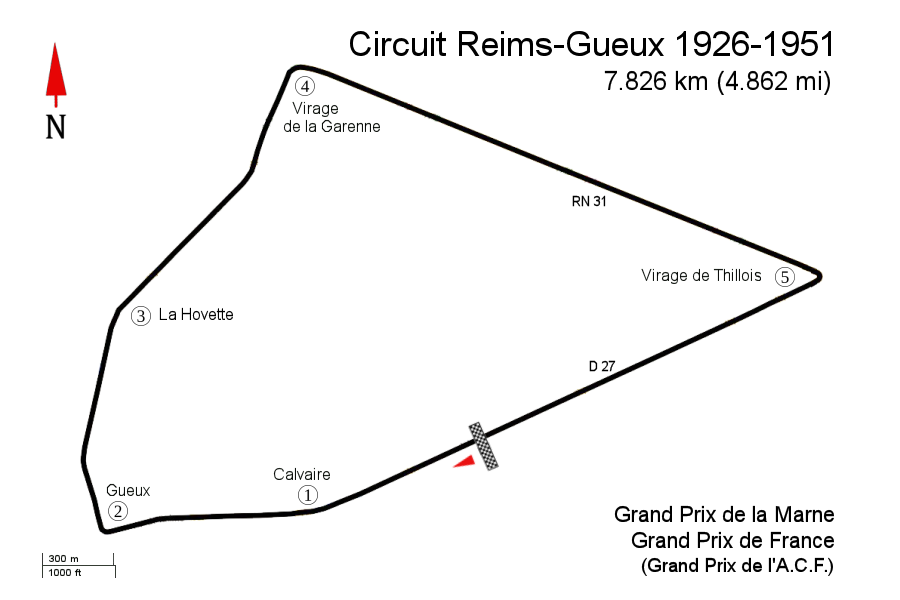

Race details
- Date: 17 July 1949
- Official name: VI Grand Prix de France
- Location: Reims
- Course: Reims-Gueux
- Course length: 7.815 km (4.856 miles)
- Distance: 64 laps, 500.160 km (310.785 miles)

Pole position
Driver	(Italy) Luigi Villoresi	Ferrari
- Time: 2:42.0

Fastest lap
Driver	(United Kingdom) Peter Whitehead	Ferrari
- Time: 2:46.2

Podium
First	(Monaco) Louis Chiron	Talbot-Lago-Talbot
Second	(Thailand) B. Bira	Maserati
Third	(United Kingdom) Peter Whitehead	Ferrari

The 1949 French Grand Prix was a Grand Prix motor race held at Reims on 17 July 1949. The race was won by Louis Chiron, who was driving a Talbot-Lago T26C.

== Entries ==
No	Driver	Entrant	Constructor	Chassis	Engine
2	(France) Raymond Sommer	Private	Talbot-Lago	Talbot-Lago T26C	Talbot L6
4	(France) Philippe Étancelin	Private	Talbot-Lago	Talbot-Lago T26C	Talbot L6
6	(Monaco) Louis Chiron	SFACS Ecurie France	Talbot-Lago	Talbot-Lago T26C	Talbot L6
8	(France) Yves Giraud-Cabantous	Private	Talbot-Lago	Talbot-Lago T26C	Talbot L6
10	(France) Louis Rosier	Private	Talbot-Lago	Talbot-Lago T26C	Talbot L6
12	(France) Pierre Levegh	Private	Talbot-Lago	Talbot-Lago T26C	Talbot L6
14	(France) Georges Grignard	Private	Talbot-Lago	Talbot-Lago T26C	Talbot L6
16	(France) Eugène Chaboud	Ecurie Lutetia	Delahaye	Delahaye 135	Delahaye V12
18	(United Kingdom) George Abecassis	HW Motors	Alta	Alta GP	Alta L4
20	(Italy) Luigi Villoresi	Scuderia Ferrari	Ferrari	Ferrari 125	Ferrari V12
22	(Italy) Alberto Ascari	Scuderia Ferrari	Ferrari	Ferrari 125	Ferrari V12
24	(United Kingdom) Peter Whitehead	Private	Ferrari	Ferrari 125	Ferrari V12s
26	(Italy) Luigi Fagioli	Luigi Platé	Talbot-Lago	Talbot-Lago 700	Talbot L6
28	(Italy) Giuseppe Farina	Automobiles Talbot-Darracq SA	Talbot-Lago	Talbot-Lago T26C	Talbot L6
30	(Thailand) B. Bira	Scuderia Enrico Platé	Maserati	Maserati 4CLT/48	Maserati L4s
32	(Switzerland) Emmanuel de Graffenried	Scuderia Enrico Platé	Maserati	Maserati 4CLT/48	Maserati L4s
34	(Argentina) Juan Manuel Fangio	Squadra Argentina	Maserati	Maserati 4CLT/48	Maserati L4
36	(Argentina) Benedicto Campos	Squadra Argentina	Maserati	Maserati 4CLT/48	Maserati L4
38	(United Kingdom) Reg Parnell	Scuderia Ambrosiana	Maserati	Maserati 4CLT/48	Maserati L4
40	(United Kingdom) David Murray	Private	Maserati	Maserati 4CL	Maserati L4

== Classification ==
=== Race ===
Pos	No	Driver	Constructor	Laps	Time/Retired	Grid
1	6	(Monaco) Louis Chiron	Talbot-Lago-Talbot	64	3:06:33.7	
2	30	(Thailand) B. Bira	Maserati	64	+ 17.6	
3	24	(United Kingdom) Peter Whitehead	Ferrari	64	+ 48.5	
4	10	(France) Louis Rosier	Talbot-Lago-Talbot	64	+ 56.7	3
5	2	(France) Raymond Sommer	Talbot-Lago-Talbot	61	+ 3 Laps	4
6	16	(France) Eugène Chaboud	Delahaye	58	+ 6 Laps	
NC	14	(France) Georges Grignard	Talbot-Lago-Talbot	48	Not classified	
Ret	12	(France) Pierre Levegh	Talbot-Lago-Talbot	39	Mechanical	
Ret	36	(Argentina) Benedicto Campos	Maserati	32	Valve	7
Ret	8	(France) Yves Giraud-Cabantous	Talbot-Lago-Talbot	30	Engine	
Ret	4	(France) Philippe Étancelin	Talbot-Lago-Talbot	26	Engine	5
Ret	34	(Argentina) Juan Manuel Fangio	Maserati	24	Throttle	2
Ret	38	(United Kingdom) Reg Parnell	Maserati	21	Engine	
Ret	18	(United Kingdom) George Abecassis	Alta	17	Gearbox	
Ret	40	(United Kingdom) David Murray	Maserati	13	Engine	
Ret	28	(Italy) Giuseppe Farina	Talbot-Lago-Talbot	11	Gearbox	6
Ret	20	(Italy) Luigi Villoresi	Ferrari	4	Brakes	1
WD	22	(Italy) Alberto Ascari	Ferrari			
WD	26	(Italy) Luigi Fagioli	Talbot-Lago-Talbot			
WD	32	(Switzerland) Emmanuel de Graffenried	Maserati			

Grand Prix Race
Previous race: 1949 Swiss Grand Prix	1949 Grand Prix season Grandes Épreuves	Next race: 1949 Italian Grand Prix
Previous race: 1948 French Grand Prix	French Grand Prix	Next race: 1950 French Grand Prix
