= 1949 Swiss Grand Prix =

Race details
- Date: 3 July 1949
- Official name: IX Grand Prix de Suisse
- Location: Circuit Bremgarten, Bern
- Course: Permanent racing facility
- Course length: 7,280 km (4.523 miles)
- Distance: 40 laps, 291,200 km (180.951 miles)

Pole position
Driver	(Italy) Giuseppe Farina	Maserati
- Time: 2:50.4

Fastest lap
Driver	(Italy) Giuseppe Farina	Maserati
- Time: 2:52.2

Podium
First	(Italy) Alberto Ascari	Ferrari
Second	(Italy) Luigi Villoresi	Ferrari
Third	(France) Raymond Sommer	Talbot-Lago-Talbot

The 1949 Swiss Grand Prix was a Grand Prix motor race which was held at Bremgarten on 3 July 1949. The race was won by Alberto Ascari driving a Ferrari 125. Ascari's team mate Luigi Villoresi was second and Raymond Sommer was third in a Talbot-Lago T26C. Giuseppe Farina set pole and fastest lap in his Maserati 4CLT/48 but retired with mechanical problems.

== Entries ==
No	Driver	Entrant	Constructor	Chassis	Engine
2	(Belgium) Johnny Claes	Ecurie Belge	Talbot-Lago	Talbot-Lago T26C	Talbot L6
8	(France) Philippe Étancelin	Private	Talbot-Lago	Talbot-Lago T26C	Talbot L6
12	(France) Georges Grignard	Private	Talbot-Lago	Talbot-Lago T26C	Talbot L6
14	(France) Pierre Levegh	Private	Talbot-Lago	Talbot-Lago T26C	Talbot L6
16	(France) Louis Rosier	Private	Talbot-Lago	Talbot-Lago T26C	Talbot L6
18	(France) Raymond Sommer	Private	Talbot-Lago	Talbot-Lago T26C	Talbot L6
20	(Italy) Giuseppe Farina	Private	Maserati	Maserati 4CLT/48	Maserati L4s
22	(Thailand) B. Bira	Scuderia Enrico Platé	Maserati	Maserati 4CLT/48	Maserati L4s
24	(Switzerland) Frank Séchehaye	Scuderia Enrico Platé	Maserati	Maserati 4CLT/48	Maserati L4s
26	(Italy) Clemente Biondetti	Luigi Platé	Talbot-Lago	Talbot-Lago 700	Talbot L8s
28	(United Kingdom) Reg Parnell	Scuderia Ambrosiana	Maserati	Maserati 4CLT/48	Maserati L4s
30	(Italy) Alberto Ascari	Scuderia Ferrari	Ferrari	Ferrari 125	Ferrari V12s
34	(Italy) Luigi Villoresi	Scuderia Ferrari	Ferrari	Ferrari 125	Ferrari V12s
36	(United Kingdom) Peter Whitehead	Private	Ferrari	Ferrari 125	Ferrari V12s
38	(Switzerland) Antonio Branca	Private	Maserati	Maserati 4CL	Maserati L4s
42	(Switzerland) Alfred Dattner	Private	Simca Gordini	Simca Gordini T11	Gordini L4
44	(Switzerland) Rudi Fischer	Private	Simca Gordini	Simca Gordini T11	Gordini L4
46	(Switzerland) Emmanuel de Graffenried	Private	Maserati	Maserati 4CLT/48	Maserati L4s
48	(United States) Harry Schell	Horschell Racing Corp	Talbot-Lago	Talbot-Lago T26C	Talbot L6
50	(United Kingdom) Fred Ashmore	Scuderia Ambrosiana	Maserati	Maserati 4CLT/48	Maserati L4s19

== Classification ==
=== Qualifying ===
Pos	No	Driver	Constructor	Time	Gap
1	20	(Italy) Giuseppe Farina	Maserati	2:50.4	–
2	22	(Thailand) B. Bira	Maserati	2:53.2	+ 2.8
3	30	(Italy) Alberto Ascari	Ferrari	2:54.7	+ 4.3
4	18	(France) Raymond Sommer	Talbot-Lago	2:55.7	+ 5.3
5	46	(Switzerland) Emmanuel de Graffenried	Maserati	2:57.5	+ 7.1
6	8	(France) Philippe Étancelin	Talbot-Lago	2:59.6	+ 9.2
7	16	(France) Louis Rosier	Talbot-Lago	2:59.6	+ 9.2
8	28	(United Kingdom) Reg Parnell	Maserati	3:00.2	+ 9.8
9	34	(Italy) Luigi Villoresi	Ferrari	3:00.8	+ 10.4
10	38	(Switzerland) Antonio Branca	Maserati	3:06.9	+ 16.5
11	12	(France) Georges Grignard	Talbot-Lago	3:08.0	+ 17.6
12	36	(United Kingdom) Peter Whitehead	Ferrari	3:10.1	+ 19.7
13	2	(Belgium) Johnny Claes	Talbot-Lago	3:11.0	+ 20.6
14	50	(United Kingdom) Fred Ashmore	Maserati	3:11.0	+ 20.6
15	14	(France) Pierre Levegh	Talbot-Lago	3:12.7	+ 22.3
16	44	(Switzerland) Rudi Fischer	Simca Gordini	3:16.6	+ 26.2
17	48	(United States) Harry Schell	Talbot-Lago	3:30.6	+ 40.2
18	24	(Switzerland) Frank Séchehaye	Maserati	3:33.2	+ 42.8
19	26	(Italy) Clemente Biondetti	Talbot-Lago	3:41.4	+ 51.0
20	42	(Switzerland) Alfred Dattner	Simca Gordini	3:52.8	+ 1:02.4

=== Race ===
Pos	No	Driver	Constructor	Laps	Time/Retired
1	30	(Italy) Alberto Ascari	Ferrari	40	1:59:24.6
2	34	(Italy) Luigi Villoresi	Ferrari	40	+ 56.6
3	18	(France) Raymond Sommer	Talbot-Lago-Talbot	40	+ 1:06.7
4	8	(France) Philippe Étancelin	Talbot-Lago-Talbot	40	+ 1:43.3
5	22	(Thailand) B. Bira	Maserati	40	+ 2:06.7
6	16	(France) Louis Rosier	Talbot-Lago-Talbot	40	+ 2:28.3
7	46	(Switzerland) Emmanuel de Graffenried	Maserati	39	+ 1 Lap
8	28	(United Kingdom) Reg Parnell	Maserati	39	+ 1 Lap
9	36	(United Kingdom) Peter Whitehead	Ferrari	39	+ 1 Lap
10	14	(France) Pierre Levegh	Talbot-Lago-Talbot	38	+ 2 Laps
11	50	(United Kingdom) Fred Ashmore	Maserati	38	+ 2 Laps
12	12	(France) Georges Grignard	Talbot-Lago-Talbot	38	+ 2 Laps
13	2	(Belgium) Johnny Claes	Talbot-Lago-Talbot	38	+ 2 Laps
14	38	(Switzerland) Antonio Branca	Maserati	37	+ 3 Laps
15	44	(Switzerland) Rudi Fischer	Simca Gordini	36	+ 4 Laps
16	48	(United States) Harry Schell	Talbot-Lago-Talbot	34	+ 6 Laps
17	42	(Switzerland) Alfred Dattner	Simca Gordini	31	+ 9 Laps
Ret	20	(Italy) Giuseppe Farina	Maserati	13	Oil pressure
Ret	24	(Switzerland) Frank Séchehaye	Maserati	10	Gearbox
Ret	26	(Italy) Clemente Biondetti	Talbot-Lago-Talbot	2	Brakes

Grand Prix Race
Previous race: 1949 Belgian Grand Prix	1949 Grand Prix season Grandes Épreuves	Next race: 1949 French Grand Prix
Previous race: 1948 Swiss Grand Prix	Swiss Grand Prix	Next race: 1950 Swiss Grand Prix
