= 1949 Italian Grand Prix =

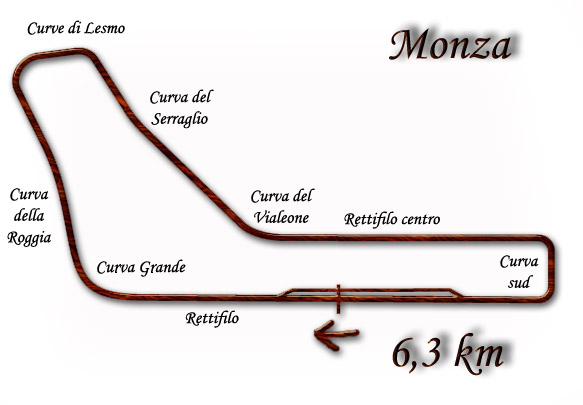

Race details
- Date: 11 September 1949
- Official name: XIX Gran Premio d'Italia; X Gran Premio d'Europa
- Location: Autodromo Nazionale di Monza, Monza, Italy
- Course: Permanent racing facility
- Course length: 6.280 km (3.902 miles)
- Distance: 80 laps, 502.380 km (312.164 miles)

Pole position
| Driver | (Italy) Alberto Ascari | Ferrari |
- Time: 2:05.0

Fastest lap
| Driver | (Italy) Alberto Ascari | Ferrari |
- Time: 2:06.8

Podium
| First | (Italy) Alberto Ascari | Ferrari |
| Second | (France) Philippe Étancelin | Talbot-Lago-Talbot |
| Third | (Thailand) B. Bira | Maserati |

The 1949 Italian Grand Prix was a motor race for Formula One cars held at Monza on 11 September 1949. It was also given the title of European Grand Prix.

The race was won by Alberto Ascari.

This was the final Major Grand Prix (Grandes Épreuves at the time) before the 1950 British Grand Prix, the first race of the Formula 1 World Championship.

== Entries ==
| No | Driver | Entrant | Constructor | Chassis | Engine |
|---|---|---|---|---|---|
| 2 | (Argentina) Benedicto Campos | Squadra Argentina | Maserati | Maserati 4CLT/48 | Maserati L4s |
| 4 | (Italy) Giuseppe Farina | Scuderia Milano | Maserati | Maserati 4CLT/48 | Maserati L4s |
| 6 | (Thailand) B. Bira | Enrico Platé | Maserati | Maserati 4CLT/48 | Maserati L4s |
| 8 | (Italy) Alberto Ascari | Scuderia Ferrari | Ferrari | Ferrari 125 | Ferrari V12s |
| 10 | (France) Louis Rosier | Private | Talbot-Lago-Talbot | Talbot-Lago T26C | Talbot L6 |
| 14 | (Italy) Nello Pagani | Private | Talbot-Lago | Talbot-Lago 700 | Talbot L8s |
| 16 | (Italy) Felice Bonetto | Scuderia Ferrari | Ferrari | Ferrari 125 | Ferrari V12s |
| 20 | (United Kingdom) Reg Parnell | Private | Maserati | Maserati 4CLT/48 | Maserati L4s |
| 22 | (France) Guy Mairesse | SFACS Ecurie France | Talbot-Lago | Talbot-Lago T26C | Talbot L6 |
| 24 | (United Kingdom) David Murray | Private | Maserati | Maserati 4CLT/48 | Maserati L4s |
| 26 | (Italy) Clemente Biondetti | Private | Maserati | Maserati 4CLT | Maserati L4s |
| 28 | (France) Eugène Chaboud | Private | Delahaye | Delahaye 135 | Delahaye L6 |
| 30 | (France) Henri Louveau | Private | Maserati | Maserati 4CL | Maserati L4s |
| 32 | (Italy) Franco Rol | Private | Maserati | Maserati 4CLT/48 | Maserati L4s |
| 34 | (Italy) Luigi Villoresi | Scuderia Ferrari | Ferrari | Ferrari 125 | Ferrari V12s |
| 36 | (United Kingdom) Leslie Brooke | Private | Maserati | Maserati 4CLT/48 | Maserati L4s |
| 40 | (France) Raymond Sommer | Scuderia Ferrari | Ferrari | Ferrari 125 | Ferrari V12s |
| 42 | (Switzerland) Emmanuel de Graffenried | Scuderia Enrico Platé | Maserati | Maserati 4CLT/48 | Maserati L4s |
| 44 | (United Kingdom) Cuth Harrison | Private | ERA | ERA B | ERA L6s |
| 50 | (Belgium) Johnny Claes | Ecurie Belge | Talbot-Lago | Talbot-Lago T26C | Talbot L6 |
| 52 | (Italy) Piero Taruffi | Scuderia Milano | Maserati | Maserati 4CLT/48 | Maserati L4s |
| 54 | (France) Philippe Étancelin | Private | Talbot-Lago | Talbot-Lago T26C | Talbot L6 |
| 56 | (France) Pierre Levegh | Private | Talbot-Lago | Talbot-Lago T26C | Talbot L6 |
| ? | (United Kingdom) Peter Whitehead | Private | Ferrari | Ferrari 125 | Ferrari V12s |

== Classification ==
=== Qualifying ===
| Pos | No | Driver | Constructor | Time | Gap |
|---|---|---|---|---|---|
| 1 | 8 | (Italy) Alberto Ascari | Ferrari | 2:05.0 | – |
| 2 | 34 | (Italy) Luigi Villoresi | Ferrari | 2:05.4 | + 0.4 |
| 3 | 4 | (Italy) Giuseppe Farina | Maserati | 2:07.8 | + 2.8 |
| 4 | 40 | (France) Raymond Sommer | Ferrari | 2:09.8 | + 4.8 |
| 5 | 2 | (Argentina) Benedicto Campos | Maserati | 2:11.8 | + 6.8 |
| 6 | 42 | (Switzerland) Emmanuel de Graffenried | Maserati | 2:12.6 | + 7.6 |
| 7 | 6 | (Thailand) B. Bira | Maserati | 2:13.0 | + 8.0 |
| 8 | 54 | (France) Philippe Étancelin | Talbot-Lago-Talbot | 2:13.8 | + 8.8 |
| 9 | 26 | (Italy) Clemente Biondetti | Maserati | 2:14.0 | + 9.0 |
| 10 | 10 | (France) Louis Rosier | Talbot-Lago-Talbot | 2:15.0 | + 10.0 |
| 11 | 32 | (Italy) Franco Rol | Maserati | 2:16.4 | + 11.4 |
| 12 | 16 | (Italy) Felice Bonetto | Ferrari | 2:16.6 | + 11.6 |
| 13 | 20 | (United Kingdom) Reg Parnell | Maserati | 2:16.8 | + 11.8 |
| 14 | 56 | (France) Pierre Levegh | Talbot-Lago-Talbot | 2:17.4 | + 12.4 |
| 15 | 44 | (United Kingdom) Cuth Harrison | ERA | 2:17.4 | + 12.4 |
| 16 | 50 | (Belgium) Johnny Claes | Talbot-Lago-Talbot | 2:19.2 | + 14.2 |
| 17 | 8 | (United Kingdom) David Murray | Maserati | 2:21.4 | + 16.4 |
| 18 | ? | (United Kingdom) Peter Whitehead | Ferrari | 2:22.8 | + 17.8 |
| 19 | 22 | (France) Guy Mairesse | Talbot-Lago-Talbot | 2:22.8 | + 17.8 |
| 20 | 28 | (France) Eugène Chaboud | Delahaye | 2:23.4 | + 18.4 |
| 21 | 30 | (France) Henri Louveau | Maserati | 2:31.0 | + 26.0 |
| 22 | 14 | (Italy) Nello Pagani | Talbot-Lago-Talbot | 2:33.8 | + 28.8 |
| 23 | 36 | (United Kingdom) Leslie Brooke | Maserati | 2:37.8 | + 32.8 |
| 24 | 52 | (Italy) Piero Taruffi | Maserati | — | — |

=== Race ===
| Pos | No | Driver | Constructor | Laps | Time/Retired | Grid |
|---|---|---|---|---|---|---|
| 1 | 8 | (Italy) Alberto Ascari | Ferrari | 80 | 2:58:53.6 | 1 |
| 2 | 54 | (France) Philippe Étancelin | Talbot-Lago-Talbot | 79 | +1 lap | 8 |
| 3 | 6 | (Thailand) B. Bira | Maserati | 77 | +3 laps | 7 |
| 4 | 42 | (Switzerland) Emmanuel de Graffenried | Maserati | 76 | +4 laps | 6 |
| 5 | 40 | (France) Raymond Sommer | Ferrari | 75 | +5 laps | 4 |
| 6 | 44 | (United Kingdom) Cuth Harrison | ERA | 75 | +5 laps | 15 |
| 7 | 52 | (Italy) Piero Taruffi | Maserati | 64 | +16 laps | 24 |
| 8 | 50 | (Belgium) Johnny Claes | Talbot-Lago-Talbot | 62 | +18 laps | 16 |
| 9 | 30 | (France) Henri Louveau | Maserati | 59 | +21 laps | 21 |
| Ret | 2 | (Argentina) Benedicto Campos | Maserati | 55 | Connecting rod | 5 |
| Ret | 28 | (France) Eugène Chaboud | Delahaye | 50 | Overheating | 20 |
| Ret | 10 | (France) Louis Rosier | Talbot-Lago-Talbot | 49 | Engine | 10 |
| Ret | 24 | (United Kingdom) David Murray | Maserati | 46 | Accident | 17 |
| Ret | 56 | (France) Pierre Levegh | Talbot-Lago-Talbot | 33 | Rear axle | 14 |
| Ret | 32 | (Italy) Franco Rol | Maserati | 30 | Engine | 11 |
| Ret | 22 | (France) Guy Mairesse | Talbot-Lago-Talbot | 28 | Accident | 19 |
| Ret | 34 | (Italy) Luigi Villoresi | Ferrari | 26 | Gearbox | 2 |
| Ret | 4 | (Italy) Giuseppe Farina | Maserati | 16 | Engine | 3 |
| Ret | 36 | (United Kingdom) Leslie Brooke | Maserati | 16 | Fuel pump | 23 |
| Ret | 16 | (Italy) Felice Bonetto | Ferrari | 14 | Cylinder head gasket | 12 |
| Ret | ? | (United Kingdom) Peter Whitehead | Ferrari | 9 | Engine | 18 |
| Ret | 20 | (United Kingdom) Reg Parnell | Maserati | 3 | Connecting rod | 13 |
| Ret | 26 | (Italy) Clemente Biondetti | Maserati | 2 | Withdrew | 9 |
| Ret | 14 | (Italy) Nello Pagani | Talbot-Lago-Talbot | 1 | Engine | 22 |

Grand Prix Race
| Previous race: 1949 French Grand Prix | 1949 Grand Prix season Grandes Épreuves | Next race: 1950 British Grand Prix |
| Previous race: 1948 Italian Grand Prix | Italian Grand Prix | Next race: 1950 Italian Grand Prix |
| Previous race: 1948 Swiss Grand Prix | European Grand Prix (Designated European Grand Prix) | Next race: 1950 British Grand Prix |
