= 1947 Belgian Grand Prix =

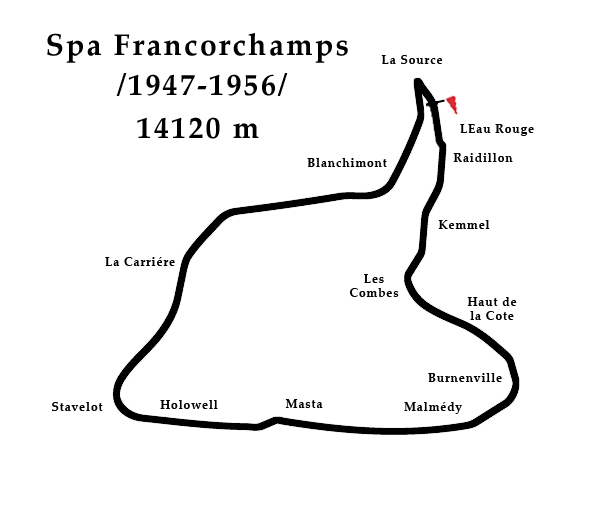

Race details
- Date: 29 June 1947
- Official name: X Grand Prix de Belgique
- Location: Spa-Francorchamps; Spa, Belgium
- Course: Road course
- Course length: 14.066 km (8.740 miles)
- Distance: 35 laps, 492.322 km (305.915 miles)

Pole position
Driver	(France) Jean-Pierre Wimille	Alfa Romeo
- Time: 5:12.5

Fastest lap
Driver	(France) Jean-Pierre Wimille	Alfa Romeo
- Time: 5:18.0

Podium
First	(France) Jean-Pierre Wimille	Alfa Romeo
Second	(Italy) Achille Varzi	Alfa Romeo
Third	(Italy) Carlo Felice Trossi; (Italy) Giovanbattista Guidotti	Alfa Romeo

The 1947 Belgian Grand Prix was a Grand Prix motor race held at Spa-Francorchamps on 29 June 1947. The race was also known as the European Grand Prix.

== Classification ==
Pos	No	Driver	Car	Laps	Time/Retired	Grid
1	8	(France) Jean-Pierre Wimille	Alfa Romeo 158	35	3:18:28.64	1
2	4	(Italy) Achille Varzi	Alfa Romeo 158	34	+1 lap	2
3	34	(Italy) Carlo Felice Trossi (Italy) Giovanbattista Guidotti	Alfa Romeo 158	33	+2 laps	
4	44	(United Kingdom) Bob Gerard (United Kingdom) Cuth Harrison	ERA B	32	+2 laps	
5	24	(France) Maurice Trintignant	Delage D6.70	31	+4 laps	
6	22	(France) Louis Rosier	Talbot 150SS	30	+5 laps	
7	40	(United Kingdom) Leslie Johnson	Talbot 150C	29	+6 laps	
Ret	6	(Italy) Consalvo Sanesi	Alfa Romeo 158	32	Gearbox	
Ret	28	(France) Henri Louveau	Delage D6.70	18		
Ret	34	(France) Eugène Chaboud	Delahaye 135S	17		
Ret	32	(France) Yves Giraud-Cabantous	Talbot 26SS	15	Accident damage	
Ret	36	(France) Emile Cornet	Delahaye 135S	15		
Ret	10	(France) Raymond Sommer	Maserati 4CL	14	Chassis	
Ret	18	(Switzerland) Christian Kautz	Maserati 4CL	14	Oil line	
Ret	20	(Monaco) Louis Chiron	Talbot 26	9	Engine	3
Ret	42	(United Kingdom) Peter Whitehead	ERA B	6	Spark plugs	
Ret	16	(Switzerland) Toulo de Graffenried	Maserati 4CL	5	Piston	
Ret	30	(France) Benoît Falchetto	Bugatti Type 35	2	Gearbox	

Grand Prix Race
Previous race: 1947 Swiss Grand Prix	1947 Grand Prix season Grandes Épreuves	Next race: 1947 Italian Grand Prix
Previous race: 1946 Belgian Grand Prix	Belgian Grand Prix	Next race: 1949 Belgian Grand Prix
Previous race: 1930 Belgian Grand Prix	European Grand Prix (Designated European Grand Prix)	Next race: 1948 Swiss Grand Prix
