= 1947 Swiss Grand Prix =

Race details
- Date: 8 June 1947
- Official name: VII Grand Prix de Suisse
- Location: Bremgarten; Bern, Switzerland
- Course: Permanent racing facility
- Course length: 7.262 km (4.512 miles)
- Distance: 30 laps, 217.867 km (135.376 miles)

Pole position
Driver	(France) Jean-Pierre Wimille	Alfa Romeo
- Grid positions set by heat results

Fastest lap
Driver	(France) Jean-Pierre Wimille	Alfa Romeo
- Time: 2:47.0

Podium
First	(France) Jean-Pierre Wimille	Alfa Romeo
Second	(Italy) Achille Varzi	Alfa Romeo
Third	(Italy) Carlo Felice Trossi	Alfa Romeo

The 1947 Swiss Grand Prix was a Grand Prix motor race held at Bremgarten on 8 June 1947.

== Classification ==
=== Heat 1 ===
Drivers in bold advanced to the final

Pos	No	Driver	Car	Laps	Time/Retired	Grid
1	36	(Italy) **Achille Varzi**	**Alfa Romeo 158**	20	1:03:37.5	
2	34	(Italy) **Carlo Felice Trossi**	**Alfa Romeo 158**	20	+0.6	1
3	32	(United Kingdom) **Raymond Mays**	**ERA D**	20	+2:31.5	
4	48	(Italy) **Nello Pagani**	**Maserati 4CL**	20	+2:43.4	
5	26	(United Kingdom) **Robert Ansell**	**Maserati 4CL**	19	+1 Lap	
6	50	(Italy) **Nino Grieco**	**Maserati 4CL**	17	+3 Laps	
7	62	(United States) **Harry Schell**	**Cisitalia D46**	17	+3 Laps	
8	42	(Italy) **Enrico Platé**	**Maserati 4CL**	15	+5 Laps	
Ret	24	(United Kingdom) Gordon Watson	Alta	12	Split tank	
Ret	60	(Thailand) Prince Bira	Maserati 4CL	7	Rear axle	
Ret	64	(France) Raymond de Sauge	Cisitalia D46	3	Tyres	
Ret	8	(France) Robert Klempener	Delage D6.70	2	Steering	

- Pole position : Carlo Felice Trossi, 2:42.9
- Fastest lap : Achille Varzi, 3:02.3

=== Heat 2 ===
Drivers in bold advanced to the final

Pos	No	Driver	Car	Laps	Time/Retired	Grid
1	38	(France) **Jean-Pierre Wimille**	**Alfa Romeo 158**	20	57:46.3	1
2	32	(Italy) **Consalvo Sanesi**	**Alfa Romeo 158**	20	+2:10.2	
3	44	(Italy) **Luigi Villoresi**	**Maserati 4CL**	20	+2:29.4	
4	46	(Monaco) **Louis Chiron**	**Maserati 4CL**	20	+2:32.4	
5	22	(France) **Raymond Sommer**	**Maserati 4CL**	20	+2:57.0	
6	16	(France) **"Raph"**	**Maserati 4CL**	18	+2 Laps	
Ret	28	(United Kingdom) Leslie Johnson	Talbot 150C	11	Accident	
Ret	2	(France) Roger Loyer	Delage D6.70	6	Gear lever	
Ret	58	(Switzerland) Adolfo Mandirola	Maserati 4CL	1		

- Pole position : Jean-Pierre Wimille, 2:47.9
- Fastest lap : Raymond Sommer, 2:46.6

=== Final ===
Pos	No	Driver	Car	Laps	Time/Retired	Grid
1	38	(France) **Jean-Pierre Wimille**	Alfa Romeo 158	30	1:25:09.1	1
2	36	(Italy) **Achille Varzi**	Alfa Romeo 158	30	+44.7	2
3	34	(Italy) **Carlo Felice Trossi**	Alfa Romeo 158	30	+1:17.4	
4	22	(France) **Raymond Sommer**	Maserati 4CL	29	+1 Lap	
5	32	(Italy) **Consalvo Sanesi**	Alfa Romeo 158	29	+1 Lap	3
6	44	(Italy) **Luigi Villoresi**	Maserati 4CL	29	+1 Lap	
7	48	(Italy) **Nello Pagani**	Maserati 4CL	28	+2 Laps	
8	42	(Thailand) **Prince Bira**	Maserati 4CL	28	+2 Laps	
9	54	(Switzerland) **Toulo de Graffenried**	Maserati 4CL	27	+3 Laps	
10	16	(France) **"Raph"**	Maserati 4CL	27	+3 Laps	
11	26	(United Kingdom) **Robert Ansell**	Maserati 4CL	26	+4 Laps	
12	12	(France) **Henri Louveau**	Delage D6.70	26	+4 Laps	
13	46	(Monaco) **Louis Chiron**	Maserati 4CL	25	+5 Laps	
14	10	(Switzerland) **Ernst Hürzeler**	Delage D6.70	25	+5 Laps	
15	18	(France) **Louis Rosier**	Talbot 150SS	25	+5 Laps	
16	4	(France) **Eugène Chaboud**	Delahaye 135S	24	+6 Laps	
17	50	(Italy) **Nino Grieco**	Maserati 4CL	24	+6 Laps	
Ret	30	(United Kingdom) **Raymond Mays**	ERA D	23	Universal joint	
Ret	14	(France) **Maurice Trintignant**	Delage	11	Fuel pump	
Ret	62	(United States) **Harry Schell**	Cisitalia D46	7	Differential	
Ret	62	(France) **Raymond de Sauge**	Cisitalia D46	7	Differential	

Grand Prix Race
Previous race: 1939 Swiss Grand Prix (pre-war)	1947 Grand Prix season Grandes Épreuves	Next race: 1947 Belgian Grand Prix
Previous race: 1939 Swiss Grand Prix	Swiss Grand Prix	Next race: 1948 Swiss Grand Prix
