= 1950 Monaco Grand Prix =

Coordinates: 43°44′4.74″N 7°25′16.8″E

← Previous race	Next race →
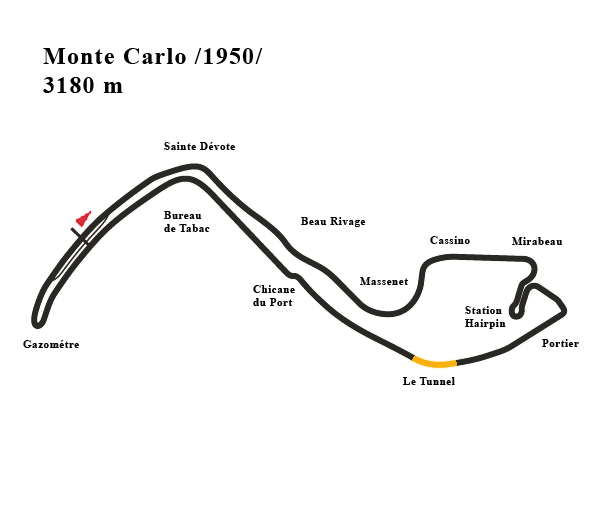

Race details
- Date: 21 May 1950
- Official name: Prix de Monte-Carlo et XI^{e} Grand Prix Automobile
- Location: Circuit de Monaco
- Course: Street circuit
- Course length: 3.180 km (1.976 miles)
- Distance: 100 laps, 318.000 km (197.596 miles)

Pole position
Driver	(Argentina) Juan Manuel Fangio	Alfa Romeo
- Time: 1:50.2

Fastest lap
Driver	(Argentina) Juan Manuel Fangio	Alfa Romeo
- Time: 1:51.0

Podium
First	(Argentina) Juan Manuel Fangio	Alfa Romeo
Second	(Italy) Alberto Ascari	Ferrari
Third	(Monaco) Louis Chiron	Maserati

The 1950 Monaco Grand Prix, formally titled the Prix de Monte-Carlo et XI^{e} Grand Prix Automobile, was a Formula One motor race held on 21 May 1950 at Monaco. It was race two of seven in the 1950 World Championship of Drivers. The 100-lap race was held at an overall distance of 318.1 km (197.1 mi) and was won by Juan Manuel Fangio for the Alfa Romeo team after starting from pole position. Alberto Ascari finished second for Ferrari and Louis Chiron finished third for Maserati. It was also the first race for Ferrari in Formula One.

== Report ==
After two qualifying sessions, on Thursday and Saturday, which Charles Pozzi, Yves Giraud-Cabantous, Pierre Levegh and Clemente Biondetti did not start, the race was dominated from start to finish by Juan Manuel Fangio, who scored his first ever victory in a World Championship event, driving an Alfa Romeo. The starting grid consisted of alternating rows of three and two, starting with three on the front row and continuing up to two on the 8th row. The first two rows of the grid (positions 1 to 5) were made up of the fastest five drivers from the Thursday qualifying session, with the remaining positions based on the other 16 drivers' times in the second session on the Saturday. This format meant that Luigi Villoresi started 6th, despite his time being fast enough for 2nd place on the grid.

Due to an accident in practice, Alfredo Pián did not start the race, with Peter Whitehead another non-starter. The race was marred by a large pile-up during the first lap, when a wave from the harbour flooded the track at Tabac Corner. Nino Farina in 2nd, spun and crashed while Fangio managed to escape the chaos. Those who were behind them tried to stop or avoid the carnage, but eight more drivers (from a field of 19 drivers) crashed and retired. None of them were injured, but José Froilán González, who damaged his Maserati in the pile-up but was subsequently running second, crashed during the second lap. His car caught fire and he suffered burns. The race went on with many cars going off at Tabac Corner, nearly causing other accidents. Ferrari driver Luigi Villoresi charged his way from the back of the field after being delayed by the pile-up, but did not finish.

Harry Schell's Cooper was the first rear-engined car to start in a championship race. Chiron's 3rd-place finish made him the only Monegasque driver to score points in Formula One until Charles Leclerc finished 6th in the 2018 Azerbaijan Grand Prix.

== Entries ==
No	Driver	Entrant	Constructor	Chassis	Engine	Tyre
2	(Argentina) José Froilán González	Scuderia Achille Varzi	Maserati	Maserati 4CLT/48	Maserati 4CLT 1.5 L4 s	P
4	(Argentina) Alfredo Pián	Scuderia Achille Varzi	Maserati	Maserati 4CLT/48	Maserati 4CLT 1.5 L4 s	P
6	(Belgium) Johnny Claes	Ecurie Belge	Talbot-Lago	Talbot-Lago T26C	Talbot 23CV 4.5 L6	D
8	(United States) Harry Schell	Horschell Racing Corporation	Cooper	Cooper T12	JAP 1.1 V2	D
10	(France) Robert Manzon	Equipe Gordini	Simca-Gordini	Simca-Gordini T15	Simca-Gordini 15C 1.5 L4 s	E
12	(France) Maurice Trintignant	Equipe Gordini	Simca-Gordini	Simca-Gordini T15	Simca-Gordini 15C 1.5 L4 s	E
14	(France) Philippe Étancelin	Philippe Étancelin	Talbot-Lago	Talbot-Lago T26C	Talbot 23CV 4.5 L6	D
16	(France) Louis Rosier	Ecurie Rosier	Talbot-Lago	Talbot-Lago T26C	Talbot 23CV 4.5 L6	D
18	(France) Charles Pozzi	Ecurie Rosier	Talbot-Lago	Talbot-Lago T26C	Talbot 23CV 4.5 L6	D
20	(France) Yves Giraud-Cabantous	Automobiles Talbot-Darracq	Talbot-Lago	Talbot-Lago T26C	Talbot 23CV 4.5 L6	D
22	(France) Pierre Levegh	Pierre Levegh	Talbot-Lago	Talbot-Lago T26C	Talbot 23CV 4.5 L6	D
24	(United Kingdom) Cuth Harrison	Cuth Harrison	ERA	ERA B/C	ERA 1.5 L6 s	D
26	(United Kingdom) Bob Gerard	Bob Gerard	ERA	ERA A	ERA 1.5 L6 s	D
28	(United Kingdom) Peter Whitehead	Peter Whitehead	Ferrari	Ferrari 125	Ferrari 125 F1 1.5 V12 s	D
32	(Italy) Nino Farina	Alfa Romeo SpA	Alfa Romeo	Alfa Romeo 158	Alfa Romeo 158 1.5 L8 s	P
34	(Argentina) Juan Manuel Fangio	Alfa Romeo SpA	Alfa Romeo	Alfa Romeo 158	Alfa Romeo 158 1.5 L8 s	P
36	(Italy) Luigi Fagioli	Alfa Romeo SpA	Alfa Romeo	Alfa Romeo 158	Alfa Romeo 158 1.5 L8 s	P
38	(Italy) Luigi Villoresi	Scuderia Ferrari	Ferrari	Ferrari 125	Ferrari 125 F1 1.5 V12 s	P
40	(Italy) Alberto Ascari	Scuderia Ferrari	Ferrari	Ferrari 125	Ferrari 125 F1 1.5 V12 s	P
42	(France) Raymond Sommer	Scuderia Ferrari	Ferrari	Ferrari 125	Ferrari 125 F1 1.5 V12 s	P
44	(Italy) Franco Rol	Officine Alfieri Maserati	Maserati	Maserati 4CLT/48	Maserati 4CLT 1.5 L4 s	P
46	(Italy) Clemente Biondetti	Scuderia Milano	Maserati	Maserati 4CLT/50	Maserati 4CLT 1.5 L4 s	P
48	(Monaco) Louis Chiron	Officine Alfieri Maserati	Maserati	Maserati 4CLT/48	Maserati 4CLT 1.5 L4 s	P
50	(Thailand) Prince Bira	Enrico Platé	Maserati	Maserati 4CLT/48	Maserati 4CLT 1.5 L4 s	P
52	(Switzerland) Toulo de Graffenried	Enrico Platé	Maserati	Maserati 4CLT/48	Maserati 4CLT 1.5 L4 s	P
54	(France) André Simon^{1}	Equipe Gordini	Simca-Gordini	Simca-Gordini T15	Simca-Gordini 15C 1.5 L4 s	E

^1 — Entry withdrawn prior to event.

== Classification ==
=== Qualifying ===
Positions 1-5 determined by Thursday practice. The rest of the field was set on Saturday.

Pos	No	Driver	Constructor	Lap times	
Pos	No	Driver	Constructor	Thursday	Saturday
1	34	(Argentina) Juan Manuel Fangio	Alfa Romeo	1:50.2	
2	32	(Italy) Nino Farina	Alfa Romeo	1:52.8	
3	2	(Argentina) José Froilán González	Maserati	1:53.7	
4	14	(France) Philippe Étancelin	Talbot-Lago-Talbot	1:54.1	
5	36	(Italy) Luigi Fagioli	Alfa Romeo	1:54.2	
6	38	(Italy) Luigi Villoresi	Ferrari	Unknown	1:52.3
7	40	(Italy) Alberto Ascari	Ferrari	Unknown	1:53.8
8	48	(Monaco) Louis Chiron	Maserati	Unknown	1:56.3
9	42	(France) Raymond Sommer	Ferrari	Unknown	1:56.6
10	16	(France) Louis Rosier	Talbot-Lago-Talbot	Unknown	1:57.7
11	10	(France) Robert Manzon	Simca-Gordini	Unknown	2:00.4
12	52	(Switzerland) Toulo de Graffenried	Maserati	Unknown	2:00.7
13	12	(France) Maurice Trintignant	Simca-Gordini	Unknown	2:01.4
14	24	(United Kingdom) Cuth Harrison	ERA	Unknown	2:01.6
15	50	(Thailand) Prince Bira	Maserati	Unknown	2:02.2
16	26	(United Kingdom) Bob Gerard	ERA	Unknown	2:03.4
17	44	(Italy) Franco Rol	Maserati	Unknown	2:04.5
18	6	(Belgium) Johnny Claes	Talbot-Lago-Talbot	Unknown	2:12.0
19	4	(Argentina) Alfredo Pián	Maserati	Unknown	No time
20	8	(United States) Harry Schell	Cooper-JAP	Unknown	No time
21	28	(United Kingdom) Peter Whitehead	Ferrari	Unknown	No time
DNA	18	(France) Charles Pozzi	Talbot-Lago-Talbot	Unknown	–
DNA	20	(France) Yves Giraud-Cabantous	Talbot-Lago-Talbot	Unknown	–
DNA	22	(France) Pierre Levegh	Talbot-Lago-Talbot	Unknown	–
DNA	46	(Italy) Clemente Biondetti	Maserati	Unknown	–

=== Race ===
Pos	No	Driver	Constructor	Laps	Time/Retired	Grid	Points
1	34	(Argentina) Juan Manuel Fangio	Alfa Romeo	100	3:13:18.7	1	9^{2}
2	40	(Italy) Alberto Ascari	Ferrari	99	+ 1 lap	7	6
3	48	(Monaco) Louis Chiron	Maserati	98	+ 2 laps	8	4
4	42	(France) Raymond Sommer	Ferrari	97	+ 3 laps	9	3
5	50	(Thailand) Prince Bira	Maserati	95	+ 5 laps	15	2
6	26	(United Kingdom) Bob Gerard	ERA	94	+ 6 laps	16	
7	6	(Belgium) Johnny Claes	Talbot-Lago-Talbot	94	+ 6 laps	19	
Ret	38	(Italy) Luigi Villoresi	Ferrari	63	Rear axle	6	
Ret	14	(France) Philippe Étancelin	Talbot-Lago-Talbot	36	Oil leak	4	
Ret	2	(Argentina) José Froilán González	Maserati	1	Accident	3	
Ret	32	(Italy) Nino Farina	Alfa Romeo	0	Accident	2	
Ret	36	(Italy) Luigi Fagioli	Alfa Romeo	0	Accident	5	
Ret	16	(France) Louis Rosier	Talbot-Lago-Talbot	0	Accident	10	
Ret	10	(France) Robert Manzon	Simca-Gordini	0	Accident	11	
Ret	52	(Switzerland) Toulo de Graffenried	Maserati	0	Accident	12	
Ret	12	(France) Maurice Trintignant	Simca-Gordini	0	Accident	13	
Ret	24	(United Kingdom) Cuth Harrison	ERA	0	Accident	14	
Ret	44	(Italy) Franco Rol	Maserati	0	Accident	17	
Ret	8	(United States) Harry Schell	Cooper-JAP	0	Collision	20	
DNS	28	(United Kingdom) Peter Whitehead	Ferrari		Engine	21	
DNS	4	(Argentina) Alfredo Pián	Maserati		Practice accident	18	

Notes

- ^2 – Includes 1 point for fastest lap

== Championship standings after the race ==
Drivers' Championship standings

	Pos	Driver	Points
	1	(Italy) Nino Farina	9
11	2	(Argentina) Juan Manuel Fangio	9
1	3	(Italy) Luigi Fagioli	6
18	4	(Italy) Alberto Ascari	6
8	5	(Monaco) Louis Chiron	4

- Note: Only the top five positions are listed. Only the best 4 results counted towards the Championship.

Previous race: 1950 British Grand Prix	FIA Formula One World Championship; 1950 season	Next race: 1950 Indianapolis 500
Previous race: 1948 Monaco Grand Prix	Monaco Grand Prix	Next race: 1952 Monaco Grand Prix
