= 1947 French Grand Prix =

Race details
- Date: 21 September 1947
- Official name: XXXIV Grand Prix de l'ACF
- Location: Lyon-Parilly, France
- Course length: 7.289 km (4.529 miles)
- Distance: 70 laps, 510.262 km (317.063 miles)

Pole position
Driver	(France) Henri Louveau	Maserati
- Time: 3:17.9

Fastest lap
Drivers	(Italy) Alberto Ascari	Maserati
	(Italy) Luigi Villoresi	Maserati
	(France) "Raph"	Maserati
- Time: 3:17.5

Podium
First	(Monaco) Louis Chiron	Talbot-Lago
Second	(France) Henri Louveau	Maserati
Third	(France) Eugène Chaboud	Talbot-Lago

The 1947 French Grand Prix was a Grand Prix motor race held at Lyon-Parilly on 21 September 1947 and was won by Louis Chiron driving a Talbot-Lago. The race was marred by an accident involving Pierre Levegh crashing into and killing 2 spectators.

== Entries ==
As the first French Grand Prix held after World War II the entry was quite mixed. Pre-race favourites, the two Alfa Romeo 158s entered by Jean-Pierre Wimille, did not arrive. The entrants which did arrive were two two-seater Delahayes, four sports car Talbot-Lagos with two single seaters for Louis Chiron and Luigi Chinetti, six Maseratis, two of which were the latest 4CLTs for Alberto Ascari and Luigi Villoresi, three ERAs, one of which was Peter Whitehead's aging B-Type, and finally the experimental French CTA-Arsenal.

== Report ==
The start of the race was quite eventful. Henri Louveau (in a Maserati 4CL) lead at first from the front row, but was overtaken by fellow Maserati driver Pierre Levegh. Both were overtaken by another Maserati driven by Raph who lead the first lap. Meanwhile, from the back of the grid Villoresi in the newer Maserati had moved up to third place, while Raymond Sommer retired the CTA-Arsenal in its only ever race appearance without completing a lap.

On the second lap Villoresi moved into second place and by the end of the third lap had taken the lead. On the fourth lap he was forced to retire with smoke pouring out of his engine, handing the lead to Raph followed closely by Emmanuel de Graffenried, in another Maserati, who took the lead on the following lap.

Chiron made a slow start but quickly moved up through the field, taking the lead from de Graffenried on the eighth lap. de Graffenried stayed with Chiron until engine overheating forced him to retire after 20 laps, handing second place to Henri Louveau. Thanks in part to just about every competitor suffering from various mechanical issues, the lead two would hold their positions until the end of the race.

After making a fuel stop, on his 24th lap Pierre Levegh crashed his Maserati through a barrier, killing two spectators, after his engine seized.

Not long after half distance, Chiron looked to be experiencing engine problems as an oiled plug caused stuttering. Although this quickly cleared, it was clear that Chiron's car was not running well, and if not for his fellow competitors experiencing trouble themselves he would not have been competitive. Chiron's fuel stop on lap 44 left him with a lead of 48 seconds over Louveau who would himself stop on the next lap, increasing the gap to 1 minute and 35 seconds. Louveau would reduce this lead by over a minute, if not for making a late-race stop, allowing Chiron to continue running at a low enough pace to preserve the car. It was a popular victory, with the slower French cars demonstrating their much stronger reliability over the faster Maseratis, of which just one of six finished.

== Classification ==
Pos.	No.	Driver	Constructor	Laps	Time/Retired	Grid
1	6	(Monaco) Louis Chiron	Talbot-Lago MC	70	4:03:40.7	2
2	24	(France) Henri Louveau	Maserati 4CL	70	4:05:18.6	1
3	2	(France) Eugène Chaboud	Talbot-Lago Spéciale	69	+ 1 lap	3
4	30	(France) Louis Rosier	Talbot-Lago Spéciale	69	+ 1 lap	7
5	32	(France) Charles Pozzi	Delahaye 135S	67	+ 3 laps	11
6	4	(Italy) Franco Comotti	Talbot-Lago Spéciale	62	+ 8 laps	15
7	38	(United Kingdom) Peter Whitehead (United Kingdom) Ian Connell	ERA B-Type	61	+ 9 laps	6
8	?	(France) Maurice Varet (France) Pierre Meyrat	Delahaye 135S	61	+ 9 laps	12
Ret	44	(Italy) Alberto Ascari	Maserati 4CLT	63	Piston	17
Ret	28	(United Kingdom) Reg Parnell (United Kingdom) Wilkie Wilkinson	ERA E-Type	39	Steering	10
Ret	8	(France) Yves Giraud-Cabantous (United Kingdom) Lord Selsdon	Talbot T26SS	39	Engine	9
Ret	16	(France) "Raph"	Maserati 4CL	36	Engine	5
Ret	18	(France) Pierre Levegh	Maserati 4CL	23	Accident	4
Ret	22	(Switzerland) Emmanuel de Graffenried	Maserati 4CL	21	Engine	14
Ret	42	(Italy) Luigi Villoresi	Maserati 4CLT	4	Engine	16
Ret	10	(United States) Luigi Chinetti	Talbot MD	1	Engine	18
Ret	26	(United Kingdom) Leslie Brooke	ERA E-Type	1	Engine	8
Ret	14	(France) Raymond Sommer	CTA-Arsenal	0	Rear axle	13

Grand Prix Race
Previous race: 1947 Italian Grand Prix	1947 Grand Prix season Grandes Épreuves	Next race: 1948 Monaco Grand Prix
Previous race: 1939 French Grand Prix	French Grand Prix	Next race: 1948 French Grand Prix
