= 1949 Belgian Grand Prix =

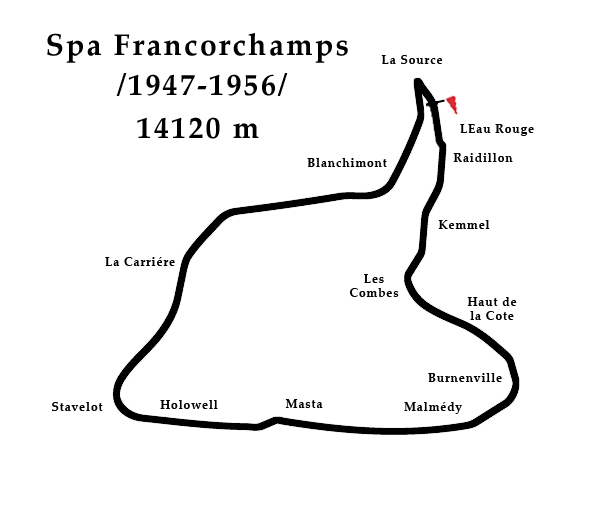

Race details
- Date: 19 June 1949
- Official name: XI Grand Prix de Belgique
- Location: Spa-Francorchamps; Spa, Belgium
- Course: Road course
- Course length: 14.066 km (8.740 miles)
- Distance: 35 laps, 492.322 km (305.915 miles)

Pole position
| Driver | (Italy) Luigi Villoresi | Ferrari |

Fastest lap
| Driver | (Italy) Giuseppe Farina | Maserati |
- Time: 5:19.0

Podium
| First | (France) Louis Rosier | Talbot-Lago-Talbot |
| Second | (Italy) Luigi Villoresi | Ferrari |
| Third | (Italy) Alberto Ascari | Ferrari |

The 1949 Belgian Grand Prix was a Grand Prix motor race which was held at Spa-Francorchamps on 19 June 1949. The race was won by Louis Rosier driving a Talbot-Lago T26C.

== Entries ==
| No | Driver | Entrant | Constructor | Chassis | Engine |
|---|---|---|---|---|---|
| 2 | (Italy) Luigi Villoresi | Scuderia Ferrari | Ferrari | Ferrari 125 | Ferrari V12s |
| 4 | (Italy) Alberto Ascari | Scuderia Ferrari | Ferrari | Ferrari 125 | Ferrari V12s |
| 6 | (United Kingdom) Peter Whitehead | Private | Ferrari | Ferrari 125 | Ferrari V12s |
| 8 | (Argentina) Juan Manuel Fangio | Automóvil Club Argentino | Maserati | Maserati 4CLT/48 | Maserati L4s |
| 10 | (Argentina) Benedicto Campos | Automóvil Club Argentino | Maserati | Maserati 4CLT/48 | Maserati L4s |
| 12 | (Italy) Giuseppe Farina | CSI | Maserati | Maserati 4CLT/48 | Maserati L4s |
| 14 | (United Kingdom) Fred Ashmore | Scuderia Ambrosiana | Maserati | Maserati 4CLT/48 | Maserati L4s |
| 16 | (United Kingdom) Reg Parnell | Scuderia Ambrosiana | Maserati | Maserati 4CLT/48 | Maserati L4s |
| 18 | (United Kingdom) Geoffrey Crossley | Private | Alta | Alta GP | Alta L4s |
| 20 | (France) Philippe Étancelin | Automobiles Talbot-Darracq SA | Talbot-Lago | Talbot-Lago T26C | Talbot L6 |
| 22 | (France) Pierre Levegh | Automobiles Talbot-Darracq SA | Talbot-Lago | Talbot-Lago T26C | Talbot L6 |
| 24 | (France) Louis Rosier | Automobiles Talbot-Darracq SA | Talbot-Lago | Talbot-Lago T26C | Talbot L6 |
| 26 | (France) Guy Mairesse | Automobiles Talbot-Darracq SA | Talbot-Lago | Talbot-Lago T26C | Talbot L6 |
| 28 | (Belgium) Johnny Claes | Ecurie Belge | Talbot-Lago | Talbot-Lago T26C | Talbot L6 |

== Classification ==
=== Race ===
| Pos | No | Driver | Constructor | Laps | Time/Retired | Grid |
|---|---|---|---|---|---|---|
| 1 | 24 | (France) Louis Rosier | Talbot-Lago-Talbot | 35 | 3:15:17.7 | |
| 2 | 2 | (Italy) Luigi Villoresi | Ferrari | 35 | + 49.1 | 1 |
| 3 | 4 | (Italy) Alberto Ascari | Ferrari | 35 | + 4:10.7 | |
| 4 | 6 | (United Kingdom) Peter Whitehead | Ferrari | 35 | + 5:17.9 | |
| 5 | 28 | (Belgium) Johnny Claes | Talbot-Lago-Talbot | 33 | + 2 Laps | |
| 6 | 14 | (United Kingdom) Fred Ashmore | Maserati | 32 | + 3 Laps | |
| 7 | 18 | (United Kingdom) Geoffrey Crossley | Alta | 29 | + 6 Laps | |
| Ret | 10 | (Argentina) Benedicto Campos | Maserati | 21 | Oil pump | |
| Ret | 20 | (France) Philippe Étancelin | Talbot-Lago-Talbot | 19 | Gearbox | 3 |
| Ret | 26 | (France) Guy Mairesse | Talbot-Lago-Talbot | 16 | Accident | |
| Ret | 22 | (France) Pierre Levegh | Talbot-Lago-Talbot | 11 | Mechanical | |
| Ret | 12 | (Italy) Giuseppe Farina | Maserati | 9 | Accident | |
| Ret | 16 | (United Kingdom) Reg Parnell | Maserati | 7 | Clutch | |
| Ret | 8 | (Argentina) Juan Manuel Fangio | Maserati | 1 | Engine | 2 |

Grand Prix Race
| Previous race: 1949 British Grand Prix | 1949 Grand Prix season Grandes Épreuves | Next race: 1949 Swiss Grand Prix |
| Previous race: 1947 Belgian Grand Prix | Belgian Grand Prix | Next race: 1950 Belgian Grand Prix |
