= 1948 Swiss Grand Prix =

Race details
- Date: 4 July 1948
- Official name: Grand Prix d'Europe
- Location: Bern
- Course: Circuit Bremgarten
- Course length: 7.262 km (4.512 miles)
- Distance: 40 laps, 290.48 km (180.50 miles)

Pole position
Driver	(France) Jean-Pierre Wimille	Alfa Romeo
- Time: 2:54.2

Fastest lap
Driver	(France) Jean-Pierre Wimille	Alfa Romeo
- Time: 2:51.0

Podium
First	(Italy) Carlo Felice Trossi	Alfa Romeo
Second	(France) Jean-Pierre Wimille	Alfa Romeo
Third	(Italy) Luigi Villoresi	Maserati

The 1948 Swiss Grand Prix was a Grand Prix motor race held at Circuit Bremgarten, near Bern, on 4 July 1948. Despite racing for nearly two hours, at the finishing line Frenchman Jean-Pierre Wimille was only 0.2 seconds behind the race winner, the Italian driver Carlo Felice Trossi. Trossi's compatriot Luigi Villoresi finished over two and a half minutes behind the pair, in third place.

This race proved to be one of the darkest post-WWII Grands Prix ever run. Pre-World War II star driver Achille Varzi was killed when he crashed during practice. Five hours after Varzi's crash, reigning 500cc European motorcycle champion Omobono Tenni died after hitting a tree during practice for a support motorcycle race. Wealthy Swiss privateer Christian Kautz died in an accident during the race. Maurice Trintignant also had a serious accident during a support race in which he was ejected from his car and thrown in the air, landing in the middle of the race track. He was pronounced dead at the hospital, but he survived, woke up after a week-long coma, and returned to racing in 1949.

== Classification ==
Pos.	No.	Driver	Car	Laps	Time/Retired	Grid
1	26	(Italy) Carlo Felice Trossi	Alfa Romeo 158	40	1:59:17.3	4
2	30	(France) Jean-Pierre Wimille	Alfa Romeo 158	40	+ 0.2 s	1
3	34	(Italy) Luigi Villoresi	Maserati 4CLT/48	40	+ 2:37.3	3
4	56	(Italy) Consalvo Sanesi	Alfa Romeo 158	39	+ 1 lap	6
5	32	(Italy) Alberto Ascari	Maserati 4CLT/48	39	+ 1 lap	5
6	4	(Monaco) Louis Chiron	Talbot-Lago T26	38	+ 2 laps	8
7	8	(France) Charles Pozzi	Talbot-Lago T26SS	37	+ 3 laps	10
8	54	(France) Yves Giraud-Cabantous	Talbot-Lago T150C	36	+ 4 laps	20
9	42	(France) Igor Troubetzkoy	Ferrari 166SC	35	+ 5 laps	18
Ret	40	(Italy) Clemente Biondetti	Ferrari 166C	31	Overheating	15
Ret	46	(Italy) Luigi Fagioli	Maserati 4CL	28	Engine	17
Ret	38	(Italy) Giuseppe Farina	Maserati 4CLT	28	Engine	2
Ret	24	(United Kingdom) Raymond Mays	ERA B-Type	23	Drive shaft	9
Ret	52	(Thailand) B. Bira	Maserati 4CL	10	Gearbox	16
Ret	18	(France) Louis Rosier	Talbot-Lago T26C	10	Oil leak	14
Ret	48	(Switzerland) Emmanuel de Graffenried	Maserati 4CL	10	Collision	13
Ret	36	(Italy) Gianfranco Comotti	Talbot-Lago T26C	7	Oil leak	19
Ret	10	(France) Raymond Sommer	Gordini T15	5	Engine	7
Ret	20	(United Kingdom) George Abecassis	Alta GP	4	Accident	12
Ret	50	(Switzerland) Christian Kautz	Maserati 4CL	2	Fatal accident	11
DNQ	44	(Argentina) Clemar Bucci	Maserati 4CL			
DNQ	22	(United Kingdom) Bob Gerard	ERA B-Type			
DNS	28	(Italy) Achille Varzi	Alfa Romeo 158		Fatal accident	

Grand Prix Race
Previous race: 1948 Monaco Grand Prix	1948 Grand Prix season Grandes Épreuves	Next race: 1948 French Grand Prix
Previous race: 1947 Swiss Grand Prix	Swiss Grand Prix	Next race: 1949 Swiss Grand Prix
Previous race: 1947 Belgian Grand Prix	European Grand Prix (Designated European Grand Prix)	Next race: 1949 Italian Grand Prix
