= 1948 French Grand Prix =

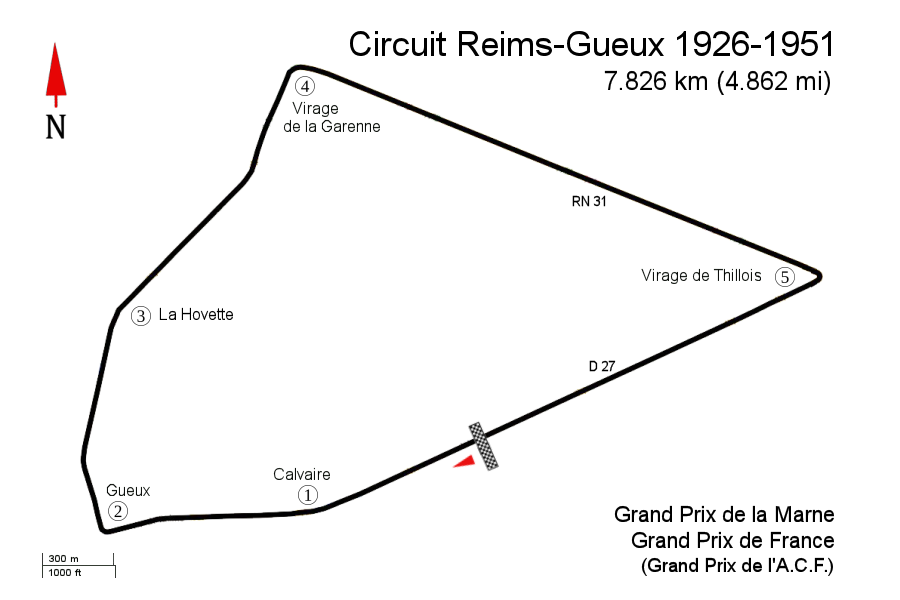

Race details
- Date: 18 July 1948
- Official name: XXXV Grand Prix de l'ACF
- Location: Reims
- Course: Reims-Gueux
- Course length: 7.774 km (4.831 miles)
- Distance: 64 laps, 497.536 km (309.155 miles)

Pole position
Driver	(France) Jean-Pierre Wimille	Alfa Romeo
- Time: 2:35.2

Fastest lap
Driver	(France) Jean-Pierre Wimille	Alfa Romeo
- Time: 2:41.2

Podium
First	(France) Jean-Pierre Wimille	Alfa Romeo
Second	(Italy) Consalvo Sanesi	Alfa Romeo
Third	(Italy) Alberto Ascari	Alfa Romeo

The 1948 French Grand Prix was a Grand Prix motor race, held at Reims on 18 July 1948. The race was won by Jean-Pierre Wimille, driving an Alfa Romeo 158.

== Report ==
Official practice was held in very wet conditions. In spite of this Jean-Pierre Wimille was able to set a time of 2:35.2, not far from the record set in 1939 in dry conditions, nearly 10 seconds faster than Alberto Ascari and nearly 20 seconds faster than the fastest non-Alfa Romeo, Philippe Étancelin's Talbot-Lago.

As expected, the three Alfa Romeos lead at the start from the Talbot-Lagos. However, Luigi Villoresi's Maserati, which started from near the back of the grid, quickly moved up into third place ahead of Consalvo Sanesi in the third of the Alfas. Villoresi was starting to challenge Ascari for second place when forced to pit for what would be the first of many mechanical issues. This allowed Alfa Romeo to take an easy 1-2-3 win, two laps ahead of the best Talbot-Lago. Although Wimille and Ascari would swap for the lead a few times, mostly as a result of pitstops, they finished in the order decided by team manager Giovanni Guidotti which required Ascari to slow and allow Sanesi to pass him just before the finish.

== Classification ==
Pos	Driver	Car	Laps	Time/Retired	Grid
1	(France) Jean-Pierre Wimille	Alfa Romeo 158	64	3:01:07.5	1
2	(Italy) Consalvo Sanesi	Alfa Romeo 158	64	+ 24.5	3
3	(Italy) Alberto Ascari	Alfa Romeo 158	64	+ 25.0	2
4	(Italy) Franco Comotti	Talbot-Lago T26C	62	+ 2 laps	6
5	(France) "Georges Raph"	Talbot-Lago T26C	62	+ 2 laps	8
6	(France) Louis Rosier	Talbot-Lago T26C	60	+ 4 laps	10
7	(Italy) Luigi Villoresi (Italy) Tazio Nuvolari	Maserati 4CLT/48	59	+ 5 laps	16
8	(France) Eugène Chaboud	Delahaye 135S	59	+ 5 laps	9
9	(Monaco) Louis Chiron	Talbot-Lago T26SS	56	+ 15 laps	5
10	(France) Charles Pozzi	Talbot-Lago T26SS	45	+ 19 laps	13
Ret	(Argentina) Juan Manuel Fangio	Simca-Gordini T11	41	Engine	11
Ret	(Italy) Nello Pagani	Maserati 4CL	37	Oil leak	19
Ret	(France) Yves Giraud-Cabantous	Talbot-Lago 150C	31	Fuel Tank	7
Ret	(France) Philippe Étancelin	Talbot-Lago T26C	22	Engine	4
Ret	(Italy) Soave Besana	Ferrari 166SC	19	Engine	14
Ret	(Switzerland) Emmanuel de Graffenried	Maserati 4CL	11	Oil leak	15
Ret	(United Kingdom) John Heath	Alta GP	7	Clutch	18
Ret	(France) Pierre Veyron	Simca Gordini T11	5	Engine	17
Ret	(France) Raymond Sommer	Maserati 4CM	2	Oil pressure	12
DNP	(France) Eugène Martin	CTA-Arsenal		Not present	
DNP	(Thailand) B. Bira	ERA B-Type		Not present	

Grand Prix Race
Previous race: 1948 Swiss Grand Prix	1948 Grand Prix season Grandes Épreuves	Next race: 1948 Italian Grand Prix
Previous race: 1947 French Grand Prix	French Grand Prix	Next race: 1949 French Grand Prix
