= 1948 Monaco Grand Prix =

Coordinates: 43°44′4.74″N 7°25′16.8″E

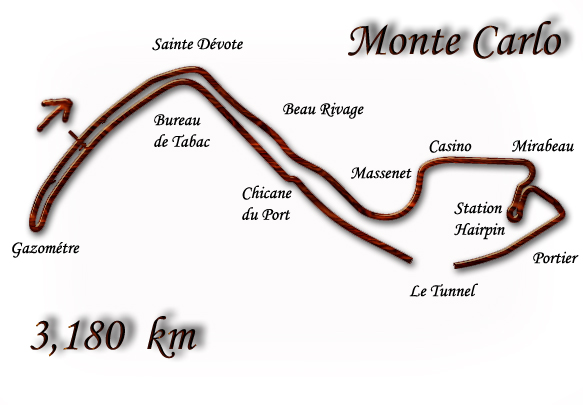

Race details
- Date: 16 May 1948
- Official name: X Grand Prix Automobile de Monaco
- Location: Monte Carlo
- Course: Circuit de Monaco
- Course length: 3.180 km (1.976 miles)
- Distance: 100 laps, 318.0 km (197.6 miles)

Pole position
Driver	(Italy) Giuseppe Farina	Maserati
- Time: 1:53.8

Fastest lap
Driver	(Italy) Giuseppe Farina	Maserati
- Time: 1:53.9

Podium
First	(Italy) Giuseppe Farina	Maserati
Second	(Monaco) Louis Chiron	Talbot-Lago
Third	(Switzerland) Emmanuel de Graffenried	Maserati

The 1948 Monaco Grand Prix was a Grand Prix motor race, held in Monte Carlo on 16 May 1948.

The first event under a new formula, 1½ litres supercharged or 4½ litres naturally aspirated, it featured a motley crowd of marques. Jean-Pierre Wimille's 1,430 cc (87 cu in) Simca-Gordini took an early lead, but was overwhelmed by the Maserati 4CLs of Giuseppe Farina and then Luigi Villoresi. Farina would take the win.

The event included a motorcycle race, open to 500cc bikes, for the only time in the Monaco Grand Prix's history. It was marred by the death of British rider Norman Linnecar.

== Classification ==
Pos	Driver	Car	Laps	Time/Retired	Grid
1	(Italy) Giuseppe Farina	Maserati 4CLT	100	3:18:26.9	1
2	(Monaco) Louis Chiron	Talbot-Lago T26	100	+ 35.2	11
3	(Switzerland) Emmanuel de Graffenried	Maserati 4CL	98	+ 2 laps	7
4	(France) Maurice Trintignant	Simca-Gordini 15	98	+ 2 laps	13
5	(Italy) Luigi Villoresi (Italy) Alberto Ascari	Maserati 4CLT	97	+ 3 laps	3
6	(France) Yves Giraud-Cabantous	Talbot-Lago	95	+ 5 laps	12
7	(France) Eugène Chaboud	Delahaye 135S	88	+ 12 laps	19
NC	(Argentina) Clemar Bucci	Maserati 4CLT	65	+ 35 laps	8
Ret	(Italy) Piero Taruffi	Cisitalia D.46	64	Fuel tank	4
Ret	(Italy) Nello Pagani	Maserati 4CL	64	Gearbox	9
Ret	(Italy) Alberto Ascari	Maserati 4CL	61	Oil pump	6
Ret	(France) Jean-Pierre Wimille	Simca-Gordini T11	60	Engine	2
Ret	(France) Prince Igor Troubetzkoy	Ferrari 166C	58	Accident	16
Ret	(United Kingdom) Cuth Harrison	ERA B-Type	47	Engine	17
Ret	(United Kingdom) Reg Parnell	ERA E-Type	22	Oil line	18
Ret	(Italy) Tazio Nuvolari	Cisitalia D.46	16	Engine	15
Ret	(France) Louis Rosier	Talbot-Lago T26	16	Engine	14
Ret	(France) Raymond Sommer	Simca-Gordini T15	5	Valve	5
Ret	(Thailand) 'B.Bira'	Simca-Gordini T15	5	Oil	10

Grand Prix Race
Previous race: 1947 French Grand Prix	1948 Grand Prix season Grandes Épreuves	Next race: 1948 Swiss Grand Prix
Previous race: 1937 Monaco Grand Prix	Monaco Grand Prix	Next race: 1950 Monaco Grand Prix
