= 1933 Nîmes Grand Prix =

Race details
- Date: 4 June 1933
- Official name: II Grand Prix automobile de Nîmes
- Location: Jean Jaurès circuit, Nîmes
- Course length: 2,617 km (1,626 mi)
- Distance: 80 laps, 20,936 km (13,009 mi)

Pole position
Driver	(France) Guy Moll	Alfa Romeo
- Time: not known

Fastest lap
Driver	(France) Philippe Étancelin	Alfa Romeo
- Time: 1:22

Podium
First	(Italy) Tazio Nuvolari	Alfa Romeo
Second	(France) Philippe Étancelin	Alfa Romeo
Third	(France) Guy Moll	Alfa Romeo

The II Grand Prix de Nîmes was a motor race held on 4 June 1933 at the Jean Jaurès circuit in Nîmes. The race was held over 80 laps and was won by Tazio Nuvolari.

== Report ==
The race featured eight competitors and was a battle between Alfa Romeo and Bugatti machines. Starting from the back, Nuvolari worked his way to the lead by lap 3, followed by Lehoux, Etancelin and Moll.

On lap 10, Etancelin, who had been closesly following Nuvolari took the lead, with Lehoux and Falchetto retiring early on due to technical issues.

Etancelin and Nuvolari battle for the lead, trading position a number of times with Etancelin setting the lap record of 1min 22sec. By lap 20 the gap between them is only one second, while Moll in third place has dropped more than one minute behind the leaders.

On lap 22, Nuvolari definitively takes the lead back from Etancelin after the latter made a mistake and went off-track, falling 15 seconds back, with Nuvolari winning the race almost a minute ahead of Etancelin, with Alfa Romeo taking the top 4 positions.

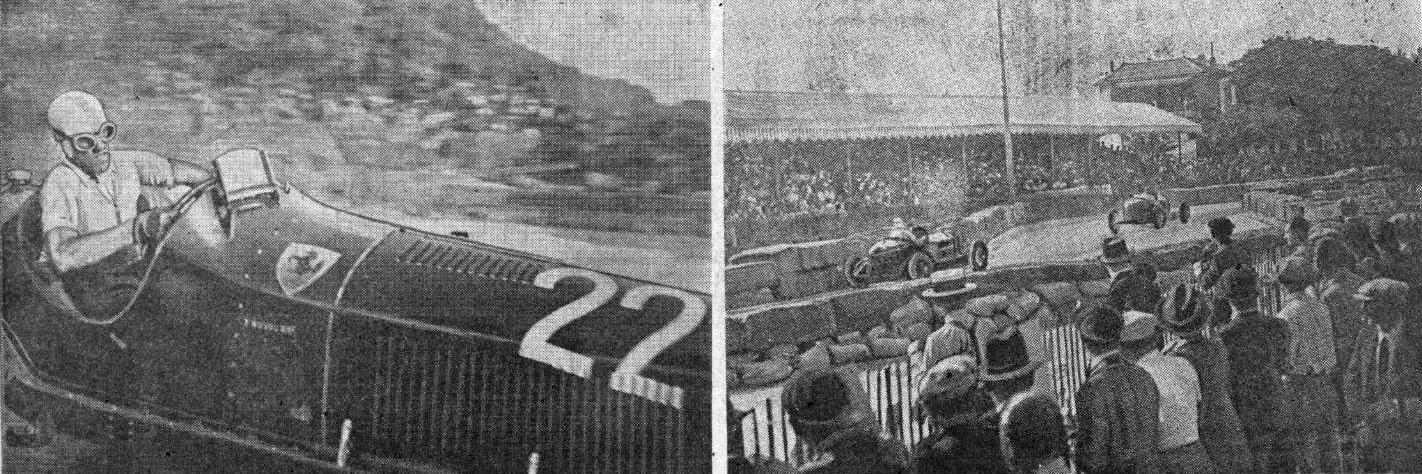
Nîmes Grand Prix 1933, with winner Nuvolari in the 22.

== Classification ==
=== Qualifying ===
Pos	No	Driver	Vehicle
1	8	(France) Guy Moll	Alfa Romeo 8C "Monza"
2	14	(France) Marcel Lehoux	Bugatti T51
3	2	(France) Philippe Étancelin	Alfa Romeo 8C "Monza"
4	16	(France) Benoit Falchetto	Bugatti T51
5	6	(Switzerland) Louis Braillard	Bugatti T51
6	24	(France) Jean-Pierre Wimille	Alfa Romeo 8C "Monza"
7	12	(France) Raymond Sommer	Alfa Romeo 8C "Monza"
8	22	(Italy) Tazio Nuvolari	Alfa Romeo 8C "Monza"

=== Race ===
Pos	No	Driver	Vehicle	Laps	Time/Retired	Grid
1	22	(Italy) Tazio Nuvolari	Alfa Romeo 8C "Monza"	80	1hr 52min 20.6sec	8
2	2	(France) Philippe Étancelin	Alfa Romeo 8C "Monza"	80	1hr 53min 19.4sec	3
3	8	(France) Guy Moll	Alfa Romeo 8C "Monza"	79	+ 1 lap	1
4	12	(France) Raymond Sommer	Alfa Romeo 8C "Monza"	78	+ 2 laps	7
5	6	(Switzerland) Louis Braillard	Bugatti T51	77	+ 3 laps	5
Ret	14	(France) Marcel Lehoux	Bugatti T51	6	Overheating	2
Ret	16	(France) Benoit Falchetto	Bugatti T51	3	Throttle	4
Ret	24	(France) Jean-Pierre Wimille	Alfa Romeo 8C "Monza"	0	Supercharger	6

== Notes and references ==
1. "Le Deuxieme Grand Prix De Nimes". Le Depeche (Toulouse) (in French). June 5, 1933. p. 4.
2. "Tazio Nuvolari trionfa nel Gran Premio di Nimes". La Stampa (in Italian). June 5, 1933. p. 4.
3. "1933 Nimes Grand Prix". Motorsport Magazine.

Preceded by 1932 Nîmes Grand Prix	Nîmes Grand Prix; 1933	Succeeded by 1947 Nîmes Grand Prix
