= 1932 Masaryk Grand Prix =

Race details
- Date: 4 September 1932
- Official name: III Masarykův Okruh
- Location: Masaryk Circuit, Brno
- Course: Permanent racing facility
- Course length: 29.140 km (18.107 miles)
- Distance: 17 laps, 495.4 km (307.8 miles)

Pole position
Driver	(Monaco) Louis Chiron	Bugatti
- Grid positions set by ballot

Fastest lap
Driver	(Monaco) Louis Chiron	Bugatti
- Time: 15:21

Podium
First	(Monaco) Louis Chiron	Bugatti
Second	(Italy) Luigi Fagioli	Maserati
Third	(Italy) Tazio Nuvolari	Alfa Romeo

The III Velká Cena Masarykova (1932 Masaryk Grand Prix, III Masarykův okruh) was a 750 kg Formula race held on 4 September 1932 at the Masaryk Circuit.

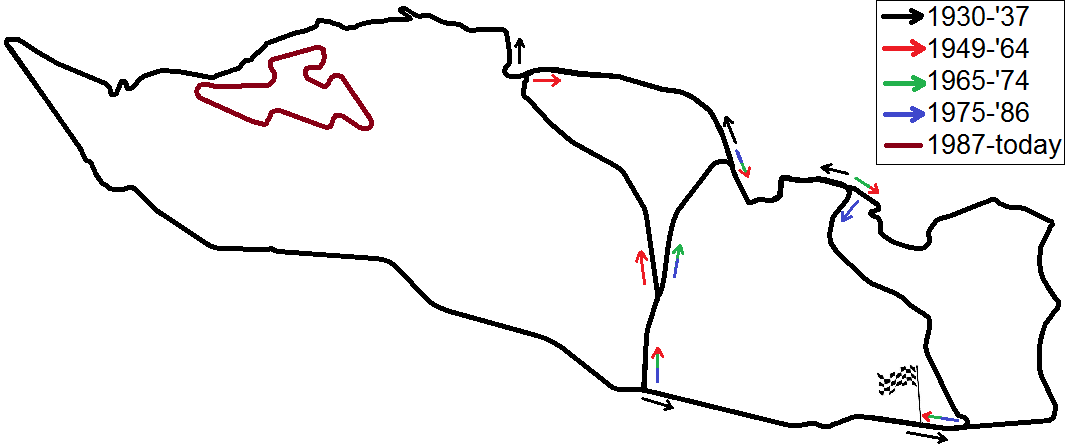
All layouts of the Masaryk Circuit (Brno Circuit) between 1930 and today combined

== Classification ==
Pos.	No	Driver	Team	Car	Laps	Time/Retired	Grid	Points
1	2	(Monaco) Louis Chiron	Automobiles Ettore Bugatti	Bugatti T51	17	4:37:29.7	1	
2	28	(Italy) Luigi Fagioli	Officine Alfieri Maserati	Maserati 8C 3000	17	+5:00.8	10	
3	4	(Italy) Tazio Nuvolari	Scuderia Ferrari	Alfa Romeo Monza	17	+28:50.4	2	
4	8	(Italy) Antonio Brivio	Scuderia Ferrari	Alfa Romeo Monza	17	+30:34.0	4	
NC	18	(Czechoslovakia) Josef Šťastný	J. Šťastný	Bugatti T35B	17	Exceeded max. time	7	
DNF	6	(Italy) Mario Umberto Borzacchini	Scuderia Ferrari	Alfa Romeo Monza	9	Differential	3	
DNF	14	(France) Guy Bouriat	Automobiles Ettore Bugatti	Bugatti T51	6	Ignition	6	
DNF	12	(France) Marcel Lehoux	M. Lehoux	Bugatti T51	6	Ignition	5	
DNF	22	(Czechoslovakia) Jan Kubiček	J. Kubiček	Bugatti T35B	3	Defective wheel	8	
DNF	24	(Italy) Achille Varzi	Automobiles Ettore Bugatti	Bugatti T51	2	Eye injury	9	
DNS	10	(Italy) Eugenio Siena	Scuderia Ferrari	Alfa Romeo Monza		Crash in practice		
DNA	16	(Germany) Manfred von Brauchitsch	M. v. Brauchitsch	Mercedes-Benz SSKL		Did not appear		
DNA	20	(Germany) Rudolf Caracciola		Alfa Romeo		Did not appear		
DNA	26	(Czechoslovakia) Zdeněk Pohl	Z. Pohl	Bugatti T35B		Did not appear		
DNA	32	(Czechoslovakia) Mirko Wagner	M. Wagner	Mercedes-Benz SSK		Did not appear		

Grand Prix Race
1932 Grand Prix season
Previous race: 1931 Masaryk Grand Prix	Czechoslovakian Grand Prix	Next race: 1933 Masaryk Grand Prix
