= 1935 Czechoslovakian Grand Prix =

1935 Masaryk Grand Prix

Race details
- Date: 29 September 1935
- Official name: VI Velká Cena Masarykova
- Location: Masaryk Circuit, Brno
- Course: Permanent racing facility
- Course length: 29.140 km (18.107 miles)
- Distance: 17 laps, 495.41 km (307.84 miles)

Pole position
Driver	(Germany) Hans Stuck	Auto Union
- Grid positions set by ballot

Fastest lap
Driver	(Italy) Achille Varzi	Auto Union
- Time: 12:37.0

Podium
First	(Germany) Bernd Rosemeyer	Auto Union
Second	(Italy) Tazio Nuvolari	Alfa Romeo
Third	(Monaco) Louis Chiron	Alfa Romeo

The VI Velká Cena Masarykova (1935 Masaryk Grand Prix) was a 750 km Grand Prix motor race held on 29 September 1935 at the Masaryk Circuit.

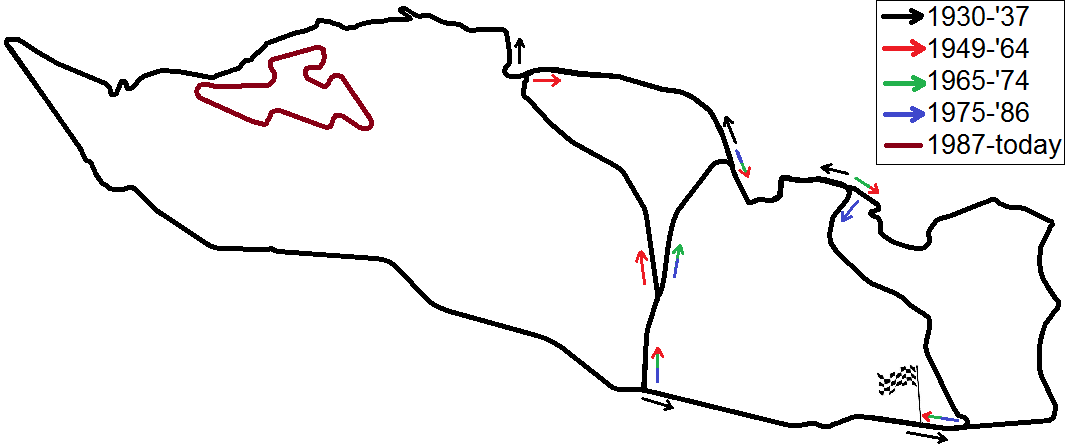
All layouts of the Masaryk Circuit (Brno Circuit) between 1930 and today combined

== Classification ==
Pos	No	Driver	Team	Car	Laps	Time/Retired	Grid	Points
1	8	(Germany) Bernd Rosemeyer	Auto Union	Auto Union B	17	3:44:10.6	3	
2	16	(Italy) Tazio Nuvolari	Scuderia Ferrari	Alfa Romeo 8C-35	17	+ 6:37.8	7	
3	18	(Monaco) Louis Chiron	Scuderia Ferrari	Alfa Romeo Tipo B	17	+ 6:41.6	8	
4	20	(Italy) Antonio Brivio	Scuderia Ferrari	Alfa Romeo Tipo B	17	+ 8:01.4	9	
5	10	(Hungary) László Hartmann	L. Hartmann	Maserati 8CM	15	+ 2 laps	4	
DNF	4	(Germany) Hans Stuck (Germany) Paul Pietsch	Auto Union	Auto Union B	13	Driver injured	1	
DNF	6	(Italy) Achille Varzi	Auto Union	Auto Union B	12	Gearbox	2	
DNF	14	(France) Jean-Pierre Wimille	J. P. Wimille	Bugatti T59	6	Pain from earlier injury	6	
DNF	12	(Czechoslovakia) Vladimír Gut	Z. Pohl	Bugatti T51	1	Broken oil pipe	5	
DNS	2	(Germany) Paul Pietsch	Auto Union	Auto Union B	1	Reserve driver		
DNA	22	(Germany) Rudolf Caracciola	Mercedes-Benz	Mercedes-Benz W25		Did not appear		
DNA	24	(Italy) Luigi Fagioli	Mercedes-Benz	Mercedes-Benz W25		Did not appear		
DNA	26	(Germany) Manfred von Brauchitsch	Mercedes-Benz	Mercedes-Benz W25		Did not appear		
DNA	28	(Italy) Giuseppe Farina	Dr. G. Farina	Maserati 6C-34		Did not appear		

Grand Prix Race
1935 Grand Prix season
Previous race: 1934 Masaryk Grand Prix	Czechoslovakian Grand Prix	Next race: 1937 Czechoslovakian Grand Prix
