= 1947 Nîmes Grand Prix =

Race details
- Date: 1 June 1947
- Official name: III Grand Prix de Nîmes
- Location: Nîmes-Courbessac Aerodrome, Nîmes
- Course: Airfield circuit
- Course length: 5.216 km (3.241 mi)
- Distance: 70 laps, 360.320 km (223.892 mi)

Pole position
Driver	(Italy) Luigi Villoresi	Maserati
- Time: not known

Fastest lap
Driver	(Italy) Luigi Villoresi	Maserati
- Time: 3:00.4

Podium
First	(Italy) Luigi Villoresi	Maserati
Second	(Monaco) Louis Chiron	Talbot-Lago
Third	(United Kingdom) Reg Parnell	Maserati

The III Grand Prix de Nîmes was a Formula One motor race held on 1 June 1947 at Nîmes-Courbessac Aerodrome, Nîmes, France. The race was held over 70 laps and was won by Luigi Villoresi in a Maserati 4CL. Villoresi started from pole position and set the fastest lap. Louis Chiron was second in a Talbot-Lago T26 and Reg Parnell third in a Maserati 4CL.

== Classification ==
Pos	No	Driver	Car	Time/Laps
1	52	(Italy) Luigi Villoresi	Maserati 4CL	3:38:39.4; 99.94kph
2	38	(Monaco) Louis Chiron	Talbot-Lago T26	+1:08.0
3	37	(United Kingdom) Reg Parnell	Maserati 4CL	+1 lap
4	35	(United Kingdom) Raymond Mays	ERA B-Type	+1 lap
5	46	(France) Charles Pozzi	Delahaye 135	+4 laps
6	36	(France) Yves Giraud-Cabantous	Delahaye 135	+4 laps
7	51	(France) Enrico Platé	Maserati 4CL	+5 laps
8	39	(United Kingdom) Fred Ashmore	ERA A-Type	+6 laps
9	34	(Italy) "Raph"	Maserati 4CL	+7 laps
10	47	(France) Edmond Mouche (France) José Scaron	Talbot-Lago T150C	+7 laps
11	44	(France) Henri Trillaud	Delahaye 135S	+7 laps
12	42	(France) Pierre Meyrat	Delahaye 135S	+13 laps
Ret	30	(France) Philippe Étancelin	Maserati 4CL	54 laps, distributor
Ret	55	(France) Raymond Sommer	Maserati 4CL	46 laps, engine
Ret	41	(Thailand) B. Bira	Maserati 4CL	40 laps
Ret	56	(France) Louis Decarolis	Bugatti Type 37A	
Ret	58	(France) Louis Rosier	Talbot-Lago 150SS	
Ret	57	(France) François Michaud	Maserati 4CL	
Ret	32	(France) Maurice Trintignant	Delage D6	
Ret	31	(France) Henri Louveau	Delage D6	
Ret	54	(France) Pierre Levegh	Delahaye 155	
Ret	40	(France) Eugène Chaboud	Delahaye 135S	
Ret	43	(France) Benoit Falchetto	Bugatti Type 35	
Ret	50	(France) Marcel Balsa	Talbot-Lago T150C	
Ret	33	(France) Jean Achard	Delage D6	1 lap, accident
Ret	45	(France) Eugène Martin	BMW 328	0 laps, accident

Previous race: 1947 Frontieres Grand Prix	Formula One non-championship races 1947 season	Next race: 1947 Challenges AGACI
Previous race: 1933 Nîmes Grand Prix	Nîmes Grand Prix	Next race: 1954 Nîmes Grand Prix
