= 1934 Masaryk Grand Prix =

Race details
- Date: 30 September 1934
- Official name: V Velká Cena Masarykova
- Location: Masaryk Circuit, Brno
- Course: Permanent racing facility
- Course length: 29.140 km (18.107 miles)
- Distance: 17 laps, 495.4 km (307.8 miles)

Pole position
Driver	(Hungary) László Hartmann	Bugatti
- Grid positions set by ballot

Fastest lap
Driver	(Italy) Luigi Fagioli	Mercedes-Benz
- Time: 13:17.2

Podium
First	(Germany) Hans Stuck	Auto Union
Second	(Italy) Luigi Fagioli	Mercedes-Benz
Third	(Italy) Tazio Nuvolari	Maserati

The V Velká Cena Masarykova (1934 Masaryk Grand Prix, V Masarykův okruh) was a 750 kg Formula race held on 30 September 1934 at the Masaryk Circuit.

== Josef Brázdil ==
The event is known for the controversial entry and death of 29-year old Czechoslovak driver Josef Brázdil, named one of the most "bizarre" and "fantastic" stories in Grand Prix and motorsport history by specialised sources. Little is known of Brázdil's life until the month of the race. He was a Bratislava resident with no racing experience, and no known involvement in motorsport prior to the event. Brázdil and a Bratislavan friend named Štefan Marciš managed to convince Marciš' very wealthy American fiancée to buy a brand new Maserati 6C-34, one of the fastest and most expensive Grand Prix cars at the time, in cash. It had the same specifications as the ones driven by works Maserati drivers, such as Tazio Nuvolari. Marciš' fiancée financed an entry for Brázdil for the Masaryk Grand Prix, despite his complete lack of experience.

Brázdil took part in the opening practice session on Wednesday as planned, although several competitors complained about his erratic driving style. That night he was arrested for financial irregularities, of which the details are still unclear. He was released on bail shortly afterwards, on the condition that he would turn himself back to the police after the Grand Prix. He arrived to the track early in the morning the day after, and left the pits at around 8 a.m., before the start of official practice. In his first flying lap, he had a fatal accident at the high speed U Krize kink. Due to the lack of braking marks, the lack of apparent mechanical issues on his car, and the fact that the accident occurred at a relatively easy part of the track, it has been speculated that his accident may have been a suicide due to his sudden legal troubles. However, it is also likely that his accident was just a simple error by a very inexperienced competitor driving an extremely challenging car.

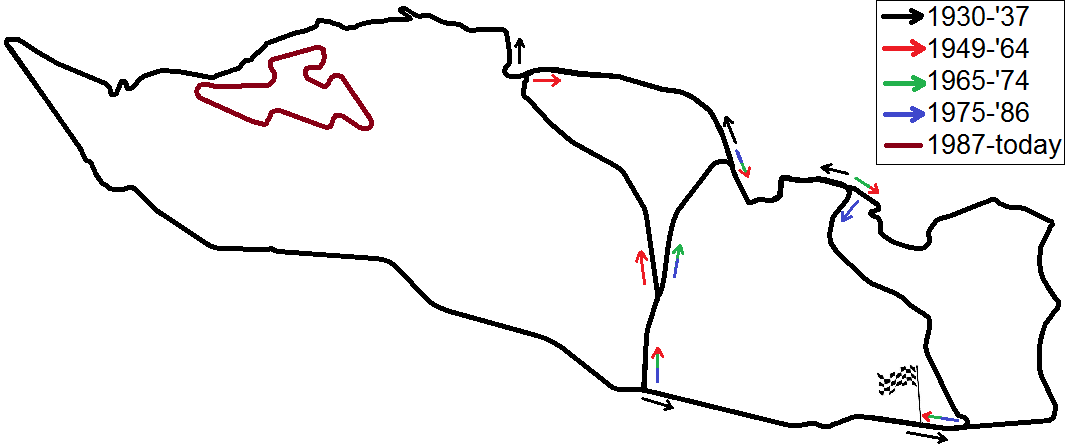
All layouts of the Masaryk Circuit (Brno Circuit) between 1930 and today combined

== Classification ==
Pos	No	Driver	Team	Car	Laps	Time/Retired	Grid	Points
1	10	(Germany) Hans Stuck	Auto Union	Auto Union A	17	3:53:27.9	5	
2	18	(Italy) Luigi Fagioli	Mercedes-Benz	Mercedes-Benz W25	17	+ 2:56.6	9	
3	26	(Italy) Tazio Nuvolari	Maserati	Maserati 6C-34	17	+ 3:46.2	12	
4	32	(Germany) Hermann zu Leiningen	Auto Union	Auto Union A	17	+ 8:37.3	6	
5	4	(Italy) Achille Varzi	Scuderia Ferrari	Alfa Romeo Tipo B/P3	17	+ 10:41.0	2	
6	20	(Germany) Ernst Henne (Germany) Hanns Geier	Mercedes-Benz	Mercedes-Benz W25	16	+ 1 Lap	10	
7	12	(Germany) Wilhelm Sebastian	Auto Union	Auto Union A	17	+ 1 Lap	15	
8	2	(Hungary) László Hartmann	L. Hartmann	Bugatti T51	15	+ 2 Laps	1	
DNF	16	(Germany) Rudolf Caracciola	Mercedes-Benz	Mercedes-Benz W25	11	Broken wheel	8	
DNF	6	(Monaco) Louis Chiron	Scuderia Ferrari	Alfa Romeo Tipo B/P3	9	Oil pipe	3	
DNF	8	(Italy) Gianfranco Comotti	Scuderia Ferrari	Alfa Romeo Tipo B/P3	9	Fuel tank/gearbox?	4	
DNF	14	(Czechoslovakia) Zdeněk Pohl	Valdemar Gut	Bugatti T51	8		7	
DNF	22	(Norway) Eugen Bjørnstad	E. Bjørnstad	Alfa Romeo Monza	8		11	
DNF	28	(France) Robert Benoist	Bugatti	Bugatti T59	8		13	
DNF	30	(France) Jean-Pierre Wimille	Bugatti	Bugatti T59	6		14	
DSF	36	(Czechoslovakia) Frantisek Holešák	F. Holešák	Bugatti T35B	6	DSQ - too slow	17	
DNF	34	(Czechoslovakia) Jan Pavlíček	Pavlíček	Bugatti T35C	1		16	
DNS		(Germany) August Momberger	Auto Union	Auto Union A		Reserve driver		
DNS		(Germany) Hanns Geier	Mercedes-Benz	Mercedes-Benz W25		Reserve driver		
DNS	24	(Czechoslovakia) Josef Brázdil	J. Brázdil	Maserati 6C-34		Fatal crash in practice		

Grand Prix Race
1934 Grand Prix season
Previous race: 1933 Masaryk Grand Prix	Czechoslovakian Grand Prix	Next race: 1935 Masaryk Grand Prix
