= Robert Brunet =

French racing driver

Robert Brunet (8 Mar 1903–1986) was a French racing driver between 1931 and 1951. Most of his 44 entries were Grands Prix, but he also entered the 24 Hours of Le Mans. He achieved a class victory and was fifth overall in the 1949 edition.

== Personal life and work ==
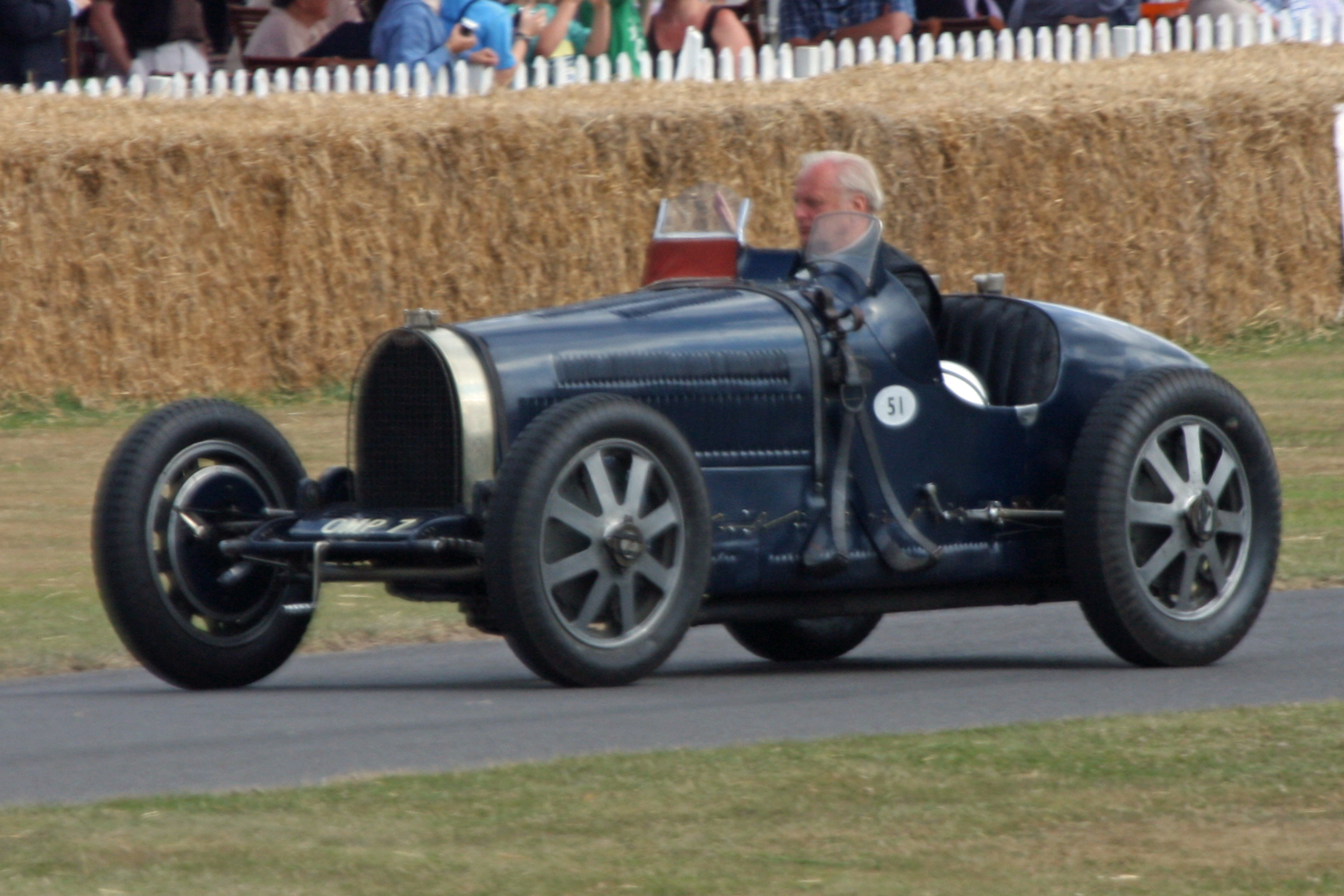
1931 Bugatti Type 51

In 1926, Brunet married the Countess of Choiseul, a rich noblewoman, with whom he invested in his racing career by buying a Bugatti. However, he did not become successful until 1933, when he purchased the Bugatti T51 previously owned by Jean-Pierre Wimille. In 1934, Brunet replaced Louis Braillard as head of Ecurie Braillard and raced with Benoît Falchetto for the following two years without achieving major results. Besides racing, Brunet lead a factory which produced capacitors for cars. With the help of contracts with the French army, it had 400 employees by 1947. After the war, the firm folded rapidly and declared bankruptcy in 1950. This meant Brunet could not afford his ordered Talbot-Lago T26C and he stopped racing soon after the Porsche 356SL he was supposed to co-drive at the 1951 Le Mans race was crashed in practice.

== Racing results ==
No.	Year	Date	Race	Entrant	Car	Teammate(s)	Result
1	1931	July 26	Dieppe Grand Prix	R. Brunet	de Coucy	none	DNA
2	1933	February 19	Pau Grand Prix	R. Brunet	Bugatti T51	none	DNF
3	1933	March 26	Tunis Grand Prix	R. Brunet	Bugatti T51	none	DNF
4	1933	May 21	Picardy Grand Prix	R. Brunet	Bugatti T51	none	DNF
5	1933	June 4	Nîmes Grand Prix	R. Brunet	Bugatti T51	none	DNA
6	1933	August 15	Coppa Acerbo	R. Brunet	Bugatti T51	none	DNF
7	1933	September 10	Italian Grand Prix		Bugatti T51		10th
8	1934	May 20	Moroccan Grand Prix	R. Brunet	Bugatti T51	none	9th
9	1934	May 27	Picardy Grand Prix		Bugatti T51		3rd
10	1934	June 17	Penya Rhin Grand Prix		Bugatti T51		6th
11	1934	July 8	Marne Grand Prix	R. Brunet	Bugatti T51	none	DNF
12	1934	July 15	Vichy Grand Prix (Heat 2)	R. Brunet	Bugatti T51	none	DNF
13	1934	July 22	Albi Grand Prix		Bugatti T51		6th
14	1934	August 19	Nice Grand Prix	R. Brunet	Bugatti T51	none	9th
15	1934	August 26	Comminges Grand Prix	R. Brunet	Bugatti T51	none	7th
16	1934	September 9	French motorcycle Grand Prix (Car class)		Alfa Romeo		2nd
17	1934	September 23	Spanish Grand Prix		Maserati		DNF
18	1935	February 24	Pau Grand Prix		Maserati 8CM		5th
19	1935	May 5	Tunis Grand Prix		Maserati 8CM		DNF
20	1935	May 26	Picardy Grand Prix	Ecurie Braillard	Maserati 8CM	Benoît Falchetto	DNF
21	1935	June 2	French motorcycle Grand Prix (Car class)		Maserati 8CM		5th
22	1935	June 30	Lorraine Grand Prix	Ecurie Braillard	Maserati 8CM	none	DNA
23	1935	July 21	Dieppe Grand Prix	Ecurie Braillard	Maserati 8CM	Benoît Falchetto	7th
24	1935	August 4	Comminges Grand Prix	Ecurie Braillard	Maserati 8CM	Benoît Falchetto	DNA
25	1935	August 18	Nice Grand Prix	Scuderia Subalpina	Maserati 8CM	Philippe Etancelin	DNF
26	1936	March 1	Pau Grand Prix	R. Brunet	Maserati 8CM	none	DNF
27	1936	May 24	3 Hours of Marseille	R. Brunet	Delahaye 135	none	3rd
28	1936	June 28	French Grand Prix	R. Brunet	Delahaye 135	Goffredo Zehender	3rd
29	1936	July 5	Marne Grand Prix	R. Brunet	Delahaye 135	none	7th
30	1936	July 12	24 Hours of Spa	R. Brunet	Delahaye 135	Goffredo Zehender	DNF
31	1936	August 9	Comminges Grand Prix	R. Brunet	Delahaye 135	none	6th
32	1936	September 5	RAC Tourist Trophy	R. Brunet/Selborne	Delahaye 135	Charlie Martin	8th
33	1937	February 21	Pau Grand Prix	R. Brunet	Delahaye 135	none	DNF
34	1937	June 19–20	24 Hours of Le Mans	André Parguel	Delahaye 135	André Parguel	25th
35	1937	July 18	Marne Grand Prix	R. Brunet	Delahaye 135	Daniel Porthault	DNF
36	1938	April 3	Mille Miglia		Bugatti	Gino Rovere	DNS
37	1939	June 17–18	24 Hours of Le Mans	Ecuria Francia	Delahaye 135	Marcel Contet	DNF (22nd)
38	1946	April 24	Coupe du Palais de la Méditerranée		Riley 1500/4		2nd
39	1946	May 19	Coupe de la Ville de St Etienne		Riley 1500/4		7th
40	1946	June 9	Coupe de Conseil Municipal		Riley 1500/4		DNF
41	1948	September 12	12 Hours of Paris	Henri Louveau	Delage D6	Henri Louveau	2nd
42	1949	April 24	Paris Grand Prix	R. Brunet	Ferrari 166C	none	DNA
43	1949	June 25–26	24 Hours of Le Mans	Pierre Meyrat	Delahaye 135	Georges Grignard; Pierre Meyrat	5th (1st in class)
44	1951	June 23	24 Hours of Le Mans	Porsche AG	Porsche 356 SL	Rudolph Sauerwein	DNS
