= Czech Republic Grand Prix =

Czech Republic Grand Prix can refer to:

- Czechoslovakian Grand Prix, a Formula One motor race
- Czech Republic motorcycle Grand Prix
- Speedway Grand Prix of Czech Republic
