= 1933 Masaryk Grand Prix =

Race details
- Date: 17 September 1933
- Official name: IV Masarykův Okruh
- Location: Masaryk Circuit, Brno
- Course: Permanent racing facility
- Course length: 29.140 km (18.107 miles)
- Distance: 17 laps, 495.4 km (307.8 miles)

Pole position
Driver	(Monaco) Louis Chiron	Alfa Romeo
- Grid positions set by ballot

Fastest lap
Driver	(Italy) Luigi Fagioli	Alfa Romeo
- Time: 15:21

Podium
First	(Italy) Louis Chiron	Alfa Romeo
Second	(Italy) Luigi Fagioli	Alfa Romeo
Third	(France) Jean-Pierre Wimille	Alfa Romeo

The IV Velká Cena Masarykova (1933 Masaryk Grand Prix, V Masarykův okruh) was a 750 kg Formula race held on 17 September 1933 at the Masaryk Circuit.

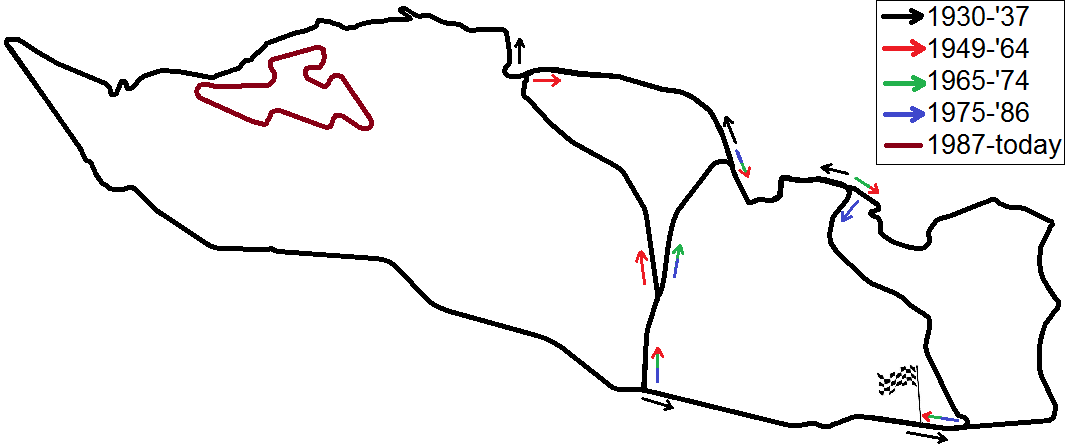
All layouts of the Masaryk Circuit (Brno Circuit) between 1930 and today combined

== Classification ==
Pos	No	Driver	Team	Car	Laps	Time/Retired	Grid	Points
1	2	(Monaco) Louis Chiron	Scuderia Ferrari	Alfa Romeo Tipo B/P3	17	4:50:22.8	1	
2	34	(Italy) Luigi Fagioli	Scuderia Ferrari	Alfa Romeo Tipo B/P3	17	+3:38.0	14	
3	26	(France) Jean-Pierre Wimille	R. Sommer & J-P. Wimille	Alfa Romeo Monza	17	+10:26.2	11	
4	24	(France) René Dreyfus	Bugatti	Bugatti T51	17	+12:30.0	10	
5	10	(Hungary) László Hartmann	L. Hartmann	Bugatti T51	17	+14:46.7	5	
6	46	(Czechoslovakia) Zdeněk Pohl	V. Gut	Bugatti T35	17	+14:49.9	16	
7	14	(Italy) Jan Kubiček	J. Kubiček	Bugatti T35B	16	+ 1 Lap	13	
8	46	(Italy) Renato Balestrero	R. Balestrero	Alfa Romeo Monza	15	+ 2 Laps	6	
DNF	28	(France) Guy Moll	G. Moll	Alfa Romeo Monza	10	Crash	12	
DNF	20	(Germany) Paul Pietsch	P. Pietsch	Alfa Romeo Monza	9	Crash	9	
DNF	18	(Germany) Manfred von Brauchitsch	Daimler-Benz A. G.	Mercedes-Benz SSKL	8	Fuel supply	8	
DNF	4	(France) Marcel Lehoux	M. Lehoux	Mercedes-Benz SSKL	4	Fuel supply	2	
DNF	36	(Italy) Antonio Brivio	Scuderia Ferrari	Alfa Romeo Monza	4		15	
DNF	2	(Germany) Rudolf Steinweg	R. Steinweg	Bugatti T35C	2	Driveshaft/Crash	3	
DNF	16	(Italy) Attilio Battilana	A. Battilana	Bugatti T35C	1	Broken exhaust	7	
DNF	8	(Switzerland) "Marko"	E. Markiewicz	Bugatti T51	0	Engine	4	
DNA	12	(Italy) Giulio Aymini	G. Aymini	Maserati 26		Did not appear		
DNA	22	(Austria) Charles Jellen	C. Jellen	Alfa Romeo Monza		Did not appear		
DNA	30	(France) Jean Gaupillat	J. Gaupillat	Bugatti T51		Did not appear		
DNA	38	(Switzerland) Walter Grosch	W. Grosch	Alfa Romeo Monza		Did not appear		
DNA	40	(Italy) Achille Varzi	A. Varzi	Bugatti T51		Did not appear		
DNA	42	(Norway) Eugen Bjørnstad	E. Bjørnstad	Alfa Romeo Monza		Did not appear		
DNA	44	(Italy) Tazio Nuvolari	T. Nuvolari	Maserati 8CM		Did not appear		
DNA		(Italy) Piero Taruffi	P. Taruffi	Maserati 8CM		Did not appear		
DNA		(Italy) Mario Umberto Borzacchini	M. U. Borzacchini	Maserati		Died in Monza crash		
DNA		(Italy) Giuseppe Campari	G. Campari	Maserati		Died in Monza crash		
DNA		(Czechoslovakia) J. Zadák	J. Zadák	Bugatti		Did not appear		

Grand Prix Race
1933 Grand Prix season
Previous race: 1932 Masaryk Grand Prix	Czechoslovakian Grand Prix	Next race: 1934 Masaryk Grand Prix
