= 1933 Spanish Grand Prix =

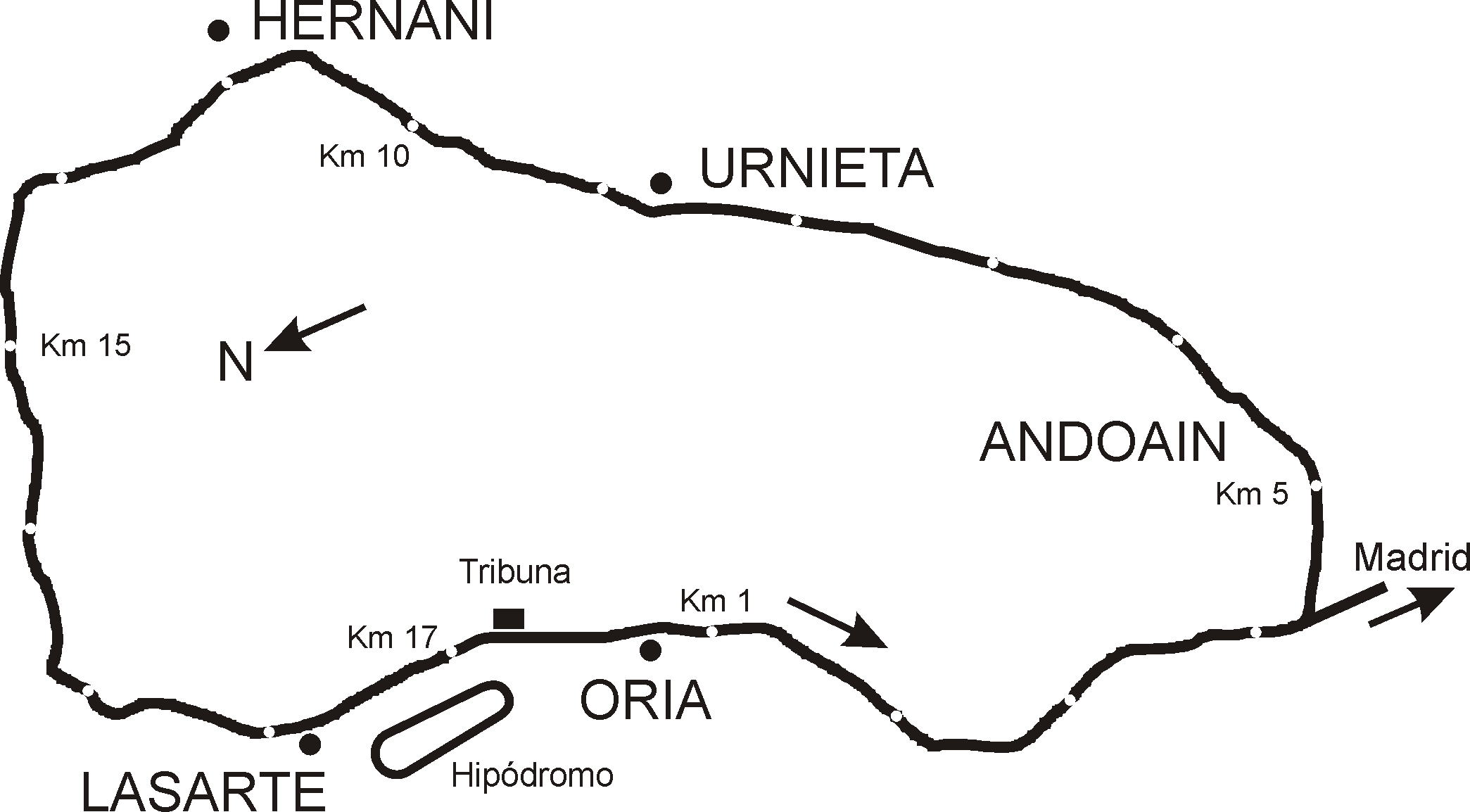
Lasarte, used for 1933 Spanish Grand Prix

The 1933 Spanish Grand Prix (formally the VIII Gran Premio de España) was a Grand Prix motor race held at Lasarte on 24 September 1933. The race was held over 30 laps of a 17.750 km circuit for a total distance of 532.500 km and was won by Louis Chiron driving an Alfa Romeo.

== Classification ==
Pos	No	Driver	Car	Laps	Time/retire
1	38	(Monaco) Louis Chiron	Alfa Romeo B (8C-2600)	30	3h50m57.8
2	10	(Italy) Luigi Fagioli	Alfa Romeo B (8C-2600)	30	3h55m22
3	8	(France) Marcel Lehoux	Bugatti T51	30	4h12m50
4	18	(Italy) Achille Varzi	Bugatti T59	30	4h14m14
5	30	(France) Jean-Pierre Wimille	Alfa Romeo 8C-2300	30	4h15m57
6	26	(France) René Dreyfus	Bugatti T59	29	4h18m46
7	22	(France) Philippe Étancelin	Alfa Romeo 8C-2300	27	+3 laps
Ret	28	(Austria) Emil Frankl	Bugatti T35B	21	Crash
Ret	24	(Italy) Piero Taruffi	Maserati 8CM (8C-3000)	20	Crash
Ret	36	(Italy) Tazio Nuvolari	Maserati 8CM (8C-3000)	20	Crash
Ret	6	(Italy) Eugenio Siena	Alfa Romeo 8C-2300	13	Did not finish
Ret	32	(Italy) Goffredo Zehender	Maserati 8CM (8C-3000)	13	Did not finish
Ret	34	(France) Benoît Falchetto	Bugatti T51	13	Did not finish
Ret	2	(Chile) Juan Zanelli	Alfa Romeo 8C-2300		Did not finish
DNA	4	(United Kingdom) "Williams"	Bugatti T59		Did not arrive
DNA	12	(Italy) Filippo Sartorio	Maserati 26 (8C-2500)		Did not arrive
DNA	14	(Italy) Ignacio Palacio	Bugatti T35		Did not arrive
DNA	16	(Switzerland) Walter Grosch	Alfa Romeo 8C-2300		Did not arrive
DNA	20	(France) Pierre Bussienne	Bugatti T51		Did not arrive

Fastest Lap: (Italy) Tazio Nuvolari, 6m41.2 (159.27 km/h)

Grand Prix Race
Previous race: 1933 Italian Grand Prix	1933 Grand Prix season Grandes Épreuves	Next race: 1934 Monaco Grand Prix
Previous race: 1930 Spanish Grand Prix	Spanish Grand Prix	Next race: 1934 Spanish Grand Prix
