= 1933 Monaco Grand Prix =

Coordinates: 43°44′4.74″N 7°25′16.8″E

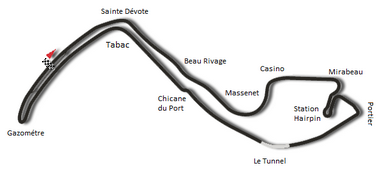

Race details
- Date: 23 April 1933
- Official name: V Grand Prix de Monaco
- Location: Circuit de Monaco; Monte Carlo
- Course: Street circuit
- Course length: 3.180 km (1.976 miles)
- Distance: 100 laps, 318.0 km (197.6 miles)
- Weather: Sunny, warm

Pole position
Driver	(Italy) Achille Varzi	Bugatti
- Time: 2:02

Fastest lap
Driver	(Italy) Achille Varzi	Bugatti
- Time: 2:03

Podium
First	(Italy) Achille Varzi	Bugatti
Second	(Italy) Baconin Borzacchini	Alfa Romeo
Third	(France) René Dreyfus	Bugatti

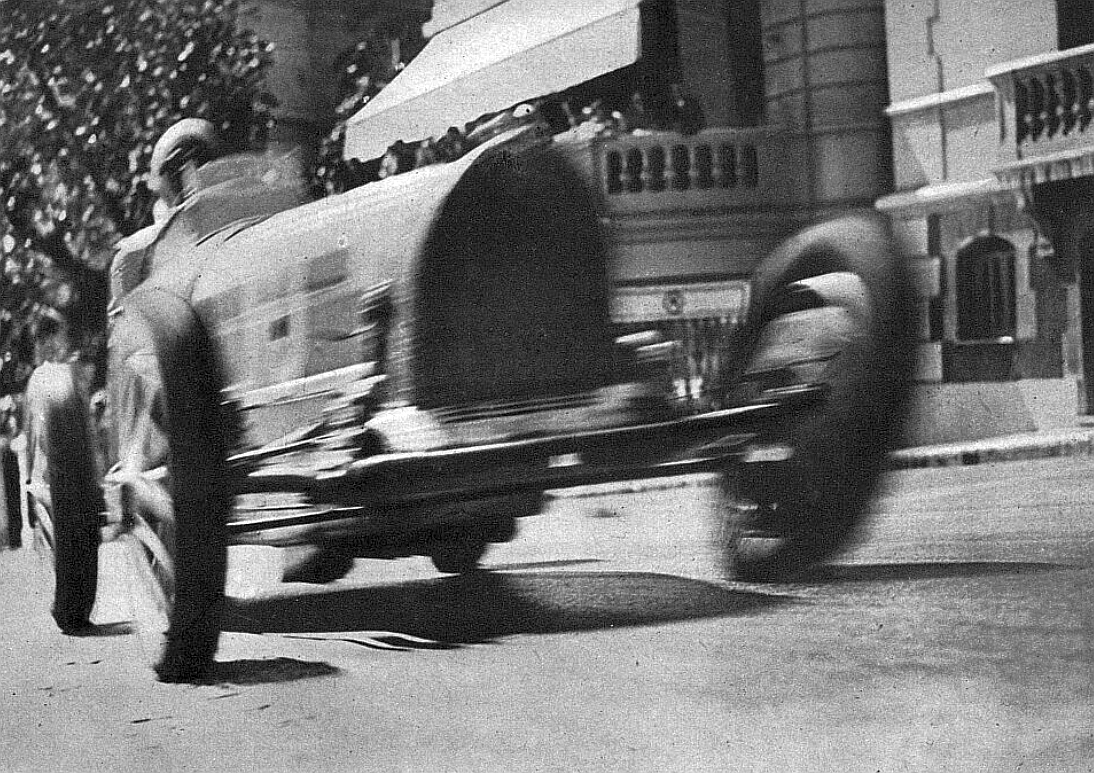
Achille Varzi with #10 race number

The 1933 Monaco Grand Prix was a Grand Prix motor race held at the Circuit de Monaco on 23 April 1933.

This was the first Grand Prix where grid positions were decided by practice time rather than the established method of balloting. Achille Varzi and Tazio Nuvolari exchanged the lead many times during the race and the race was settled in Varzi's favour on the final lap when Nuvolari's car caught fire due to over-revving. Nuvolari was then disqualified due to outside assistance while attempting to push his car to the finish.

Rudolf Caracciola suffered a season-ending accident during practice. He crashed at Tabac due to a brake failure, and suffered serious leg injuries.

== Classification ==
=== Race ===
Pos	No	Nat	Driver	Team	Car	Laps	Time/Retired	Grid
1	10	(Italy)	Achille Varzi	Bugatti	Bugatti T51	100	3:27:49.4	1
2	26	(Italy)	Baconin Borzacchini	Scuderia Ferrari	Alfa Romeo Monza	100	+2:00.0	3
3	8	(France)	René Dreyfus	Bugatti	Bugatti T51	99	+1 lap	6
DSQ	28	(Italy)	Tazio Nuvolari	Scuderia Ferrari	Alfa Romeo Monza	99	+1 lap	4
4	16	(Monaco)	Louis Chiron	Scuderia C/C	Alfa Romeo Monza	97	+3 laps	2
5	32	(Italy)	Carlo Felice Trossi	Scuderia Ferrari	Alfa Romeo Monza	97	+3 laps	10
6	38	(Italy)	Goffredo Zehender	Raymond Sommer	Maserati 8CM	94	+6 laps	11
7	12	(United Kingdom)	William Grover-Williams	Bugatti	Bugatti T51	90	+10 laps	14
8	24	(Hungary)	László Hartmann	Private entry	Bugatti T35B	86	+14 laps	18
Ret	14	(France)	Benoît Falchetto	Private entry	Bugatti T51	84	Rear axle	12
Ret	18	(France)	Philippe Étancelin	Private entry	Alfa Romeo Monza	69	Driveshaft	5
Ret	34	(Italy)	Luigi Fagioli	Private entry	Maserati 8C 3000	61	Carburetor	7
Ret	6	(United Kingdom)	Earl Howe	Private entry	Bugatti T51	48	Rear axle	13
Ret	22	(France)	Jean-Pierre Wimille	Private entry	Alfa Romeo Monza	28	Brakes	8
Ret	20	(France)	Marcel Lehoux	Private entry	Bugatti T51	25	Transmission	9
Ret	36	(France)	Raymond Sommer	Raymond Sommer	Maserati 8CM	19	Con rod	17
Ret	4	(United Kingdom)	Henry Birkin	Bernard Rubin	Alfa Romeo Monza	17	Differential	15
Ret	30	(Italy)	Eugenio Siena	Scuderia Ferrari	Alfa Romeo Monza	7	Clutch	16

=== Starting grid positions ===
1st Row	1 Pos.	2 Pos.	3 Pos.
	(Italy); Varzi; Bugatti; 2:02	(Monaco); Chiron; Alfa Romeo; 2:03	(Italy); Borzacchini; Alfa Romeo; 2:03
2nd Row	1 Pos.	2 Pos.	3 Pos.
	(Italy); Nuvolari; Alfa Romeo; 2:04	(France); Étancelin; Alfa Romeo; 2:04	(France); Dreyfus; Bugatti; 2:05
3rd Row	1 Pos.	2 Pos.	3 Pos.
	(Italy); Fagioli; Maserati; 2:06	(France); Wimille; Alfa Romeo; 2:06	(France); Lehoux; Bugatti; 2:07
4th Row	1 Pos.	2 Pos.	3 Pos.
	(Italy); Trossi; Alfa Romeo; 2:08	(Italy); Zehender; Maserati; 2:08	(France); Falchetto; Bugatti; 2:09
5th Row	1 Pos.	2 Pos.	3 Pos.
	(United Kingdom); Howe; Bugatti; 2:09	(United Kingdom); Grover-Williams; Bugatti; 2:11	(United Kingdom); Birkin; Alfa Romeo; 2:11
6th Row	1 Pos.	2 Pos.	3 Pos.
	(Italy); Siena; Alfa Romeo no time	(France); Sommer; Maserati no time	(Hungary); Hartmann; Bugatti no time

Grand Prix Race
Previous race: 1932 German Grand Prix	1933 Grand Prix season Grandes Épreuves	Next race: 1933 French Grand Prix
Previous race: 1932 Monaco Grand Prix	Monaco Grand Prix	Next race: 1934 Monaco Grand Prix
