= Louis Braillard =

Swiss racing driver (1906–96)

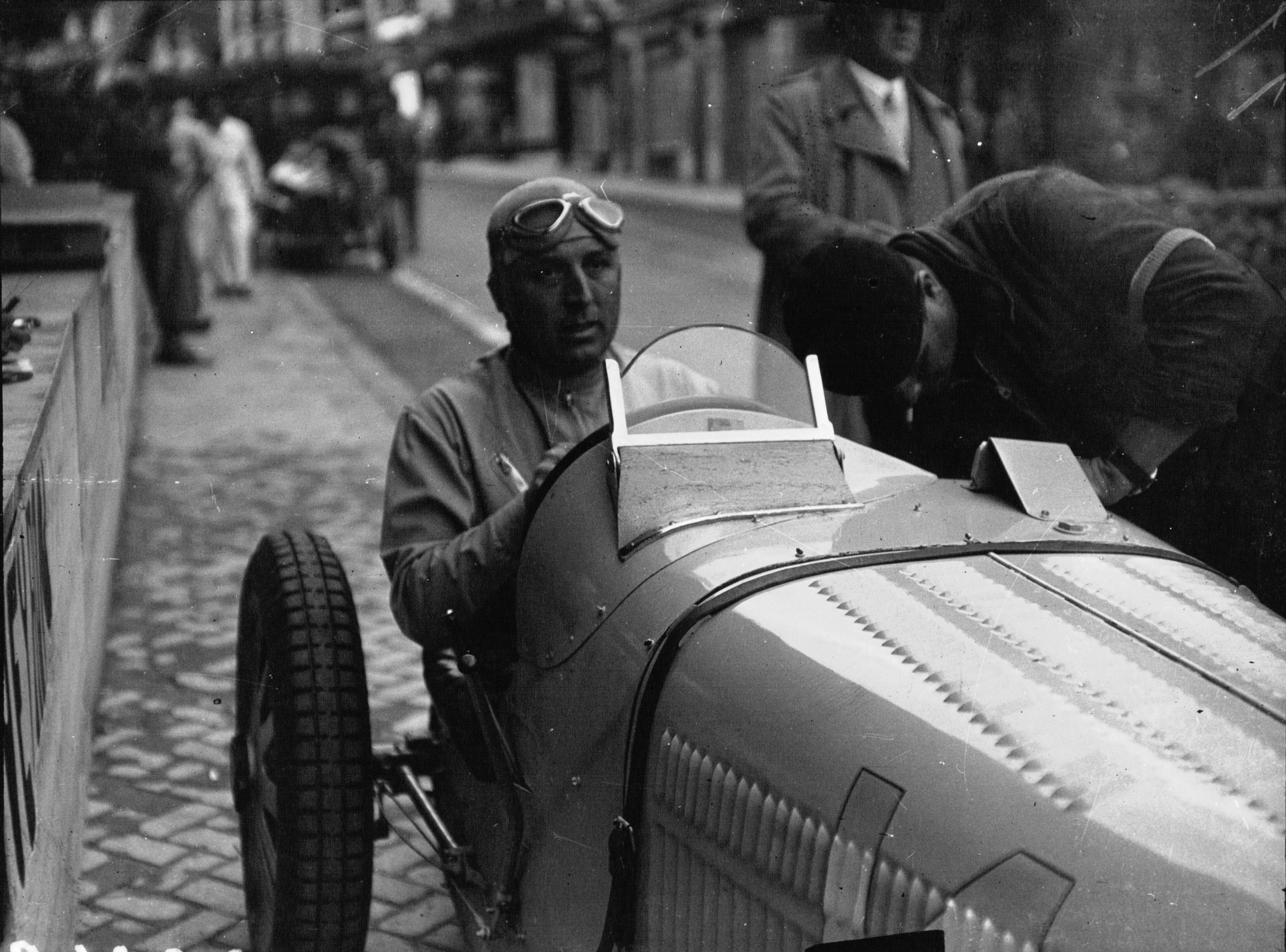
- At the Montreux Grand Prix in 1932
- Born: Louis Braillard; 8 February 1906 Renens, Vaud, Switzerland
- Died: 1996

Louis Braillard (1906–1996) was a Swiss racing driver, active in the 1930s.

== Career ==
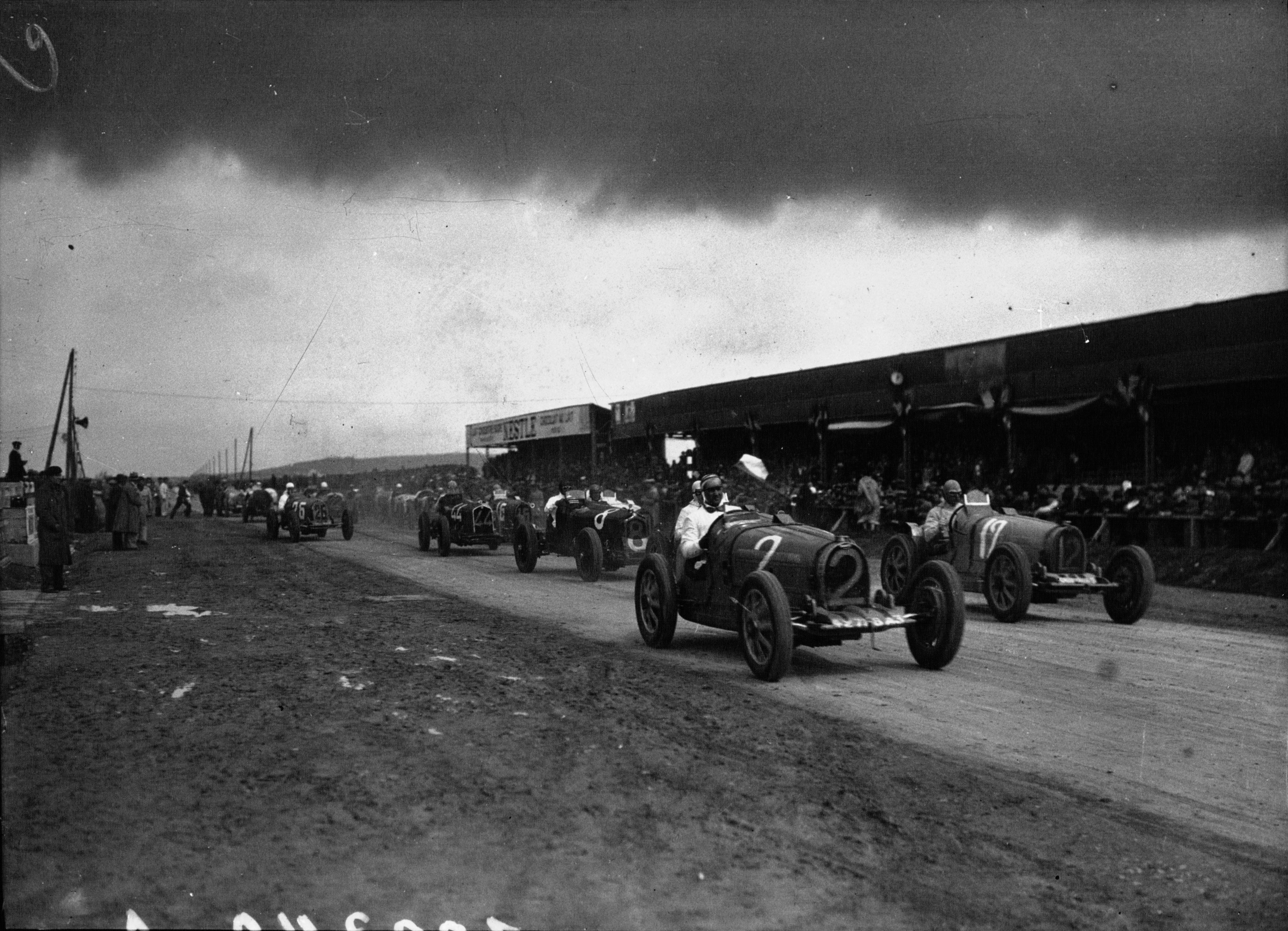
Leading away at the start of the 1933 Tunis Grand Prix (Bugatti no. 2)

Braillard started racing in a Bugatti Type 35C in the early 1930s, and won the Rheineck-Walzenhausen hillclimb in a Bugatti Type 51.

In 1933 Braillard formed Ecurie Braillard with Benoît Falchetto, the funds coming from Louis' sister Nelly. The first event for the team was the Monte Carlo Rally that year, and Braillard finished 7th overall. The pair variously raced Type 35Bs and Type 51s through the year, Braillard's major achievement being to win the first Albi Grand Prix in 1933, cruising home after Whitney Straight spun in a futile attempt to pass Braillard for the lead.

The team bought Maserati 8CMs for 1934 and Braillard finished third in class in the La Turbie hillclimb, behind Grand Prix drivers Juan Zanelli and Carlo Felice Trossi. Braillard entered one Maserati at the 1934 French Grand Prix for Indianapolis 500 winner Pete de Paolo, but de Paolo had been injured while racing for the team at the Penya Rhin Grand Prix, breaking a skull and an arm, and had to withdraw. Regular drivers Falchetto and Robert Brunet returned at the 1934 Spanish Grand Prix but both retired.

Braillard stopped driving early in 1935, following two accidents, one in a hillclimb and one while skiing. At the end of the 1935 season, with Falchetto also retiring, Nelly Braillard wound up the team, the Maseratis going to Hungarian nobleman Ernő Festetics. Braillard himself returned to his garages in La Tour-de-Peilz and Cossonay.
