= Grand Prix automobile de Nîmes =

Nîmes Grand Prix
- Nîmes-Courbessac aereodrome circuit (1947)

Race information
- Number of times held: 4
- First held: 1932
- Last held: 1954
- Circuit length: 5.216 km (3.241 miles)
- Race length: 360.320 km (223.892 miles)
- Laps: 70

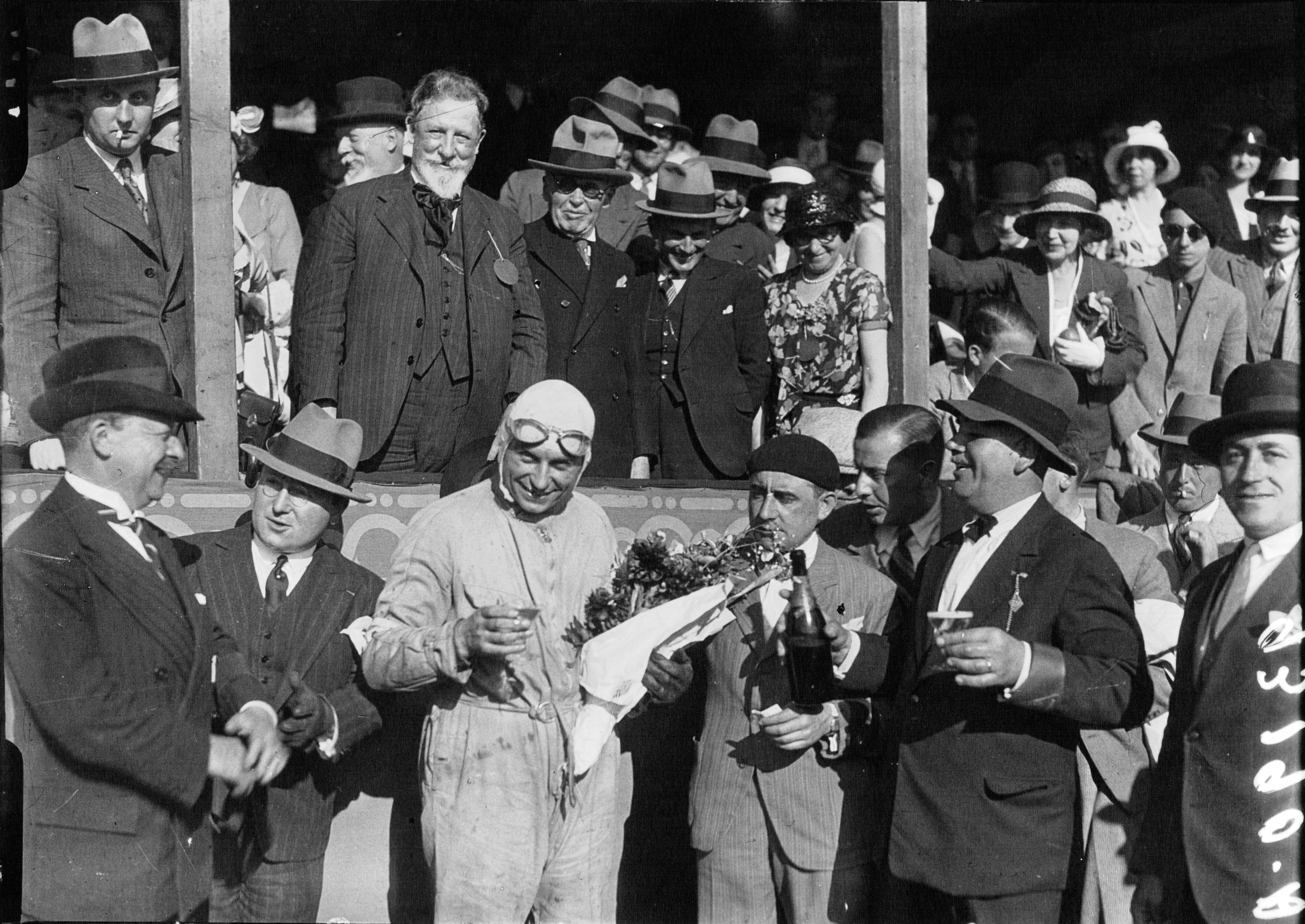
Falchetto at the 1932 Nîmes Grand Prix.

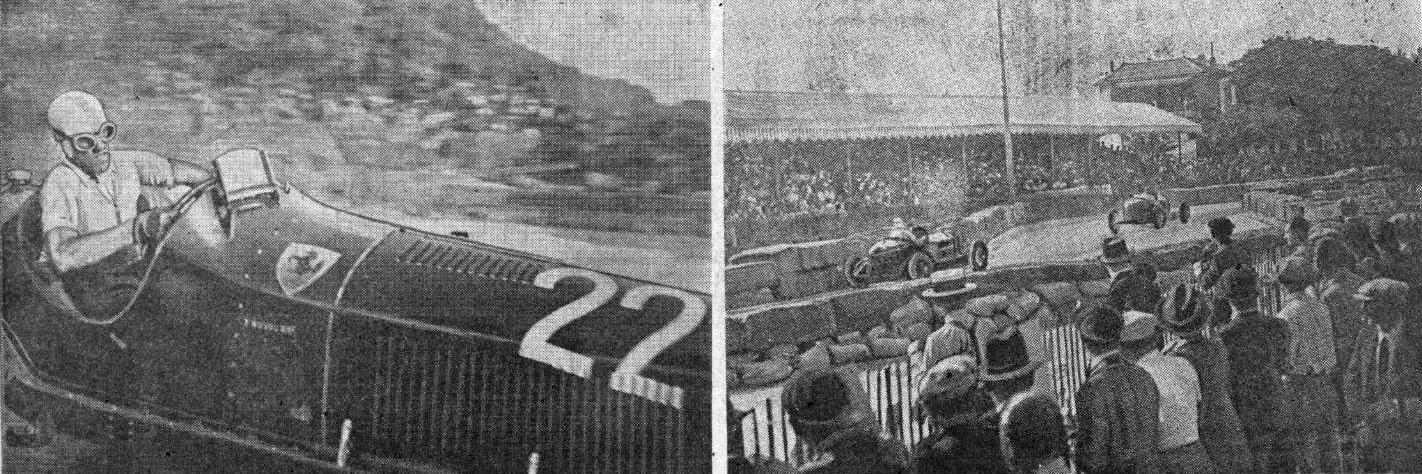
Nîmes Grand Prix 1933, with winner Nuvolari in the 22.

The Nîmes Grand Prix (French: Grand Prix automobile de Nîmes) was a Grand Prix motor race that was held in the french town of Nîmes organised in 1932, 1933 and 1947.

The 1932 and 1933 editions of the race were organised by the Automobile Club du Gard and were part of a number of grand prix races held in cities in the 1930s, inspired by the success of the Monaco Grand Prix. The race was run along on the Jean Jaurès circuit, a 2.617 km (1.626 mile) circuit which consisted of two long straights broken two fast hairpins at either end of the avenue.

The 1947 edition of the race was run at the Nîmes-Courbessac aerodrome circuit in front of more than 50000 spectators, a Sports car racing event was also held in 1954.

== Winners ==
Year	Winning Drive	Winning Consructor	Circuit	Results
1932	(France) Benoît Falchetto	(France) Bugatti	Jean Jaurès	Report
1933	(Italy) Tazio Nuvolari	(Italy) Alfa Romeo	Jean Jaurès	Report
1934-1946	Not run			
1947	(Italy) Luigi Villoresi	(Italy) Maserati	Nîmes-Courbessac	Report
1948-1953	Not run			
1954	(France) Jacques Jonneret	(United Kingdom) Jaguar C-Type	Nîmes	Report

== Notes and references ==
1. "Nuvolari partecipa oggi al G. P. di Nimes". La Stampa (in Italian). June 4, 1933. p. 6.
2. "Trionfo Villoresi-Maserati nel Gran Premio di Nimes". La Stampa (in Italian). June 2, 1947. p. 6.
3. Chauvin, Xavier; Morelli, Michel. Histoire mondiale des circuits automobiles - de 1900 a nos jours (in French). p. 53-57. ISBN 978-2-7268-9624-2.
4. "Tazio Nuvolari trionfa nel Gran Premio di Nimes". La Stampa (in Italian). June 5, 1933. p. 4.
5. Tracé du circuit de l'aérodrome
6. "1932 Nimes Grand Prix". Motorsport Magazine.
7. "1933 Nimes Grand Prix". Motorsport Magazine.
8. "1947 Nimes Grand Prix". Motorsport Magazine.
9. "1954 Grand Prix de Nîmes Sports". Racing Years.
