= Zdeněk Pohl =

Czechoslovak racing driver (1907–1986)

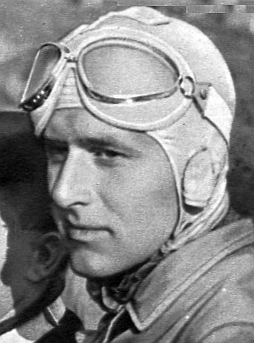
- Pohl in 1935
- Born: Zdeněk Pohl; 19 May 1907 Liebshausen, Austria-Hungary
- Died: 14 October 1986 (aged 79)

Zdeněk Pohl (19 May 1907 – 14 October 1986) was a Czechoslovak racing driver who was primarily active before the Second World War.

== Career ==
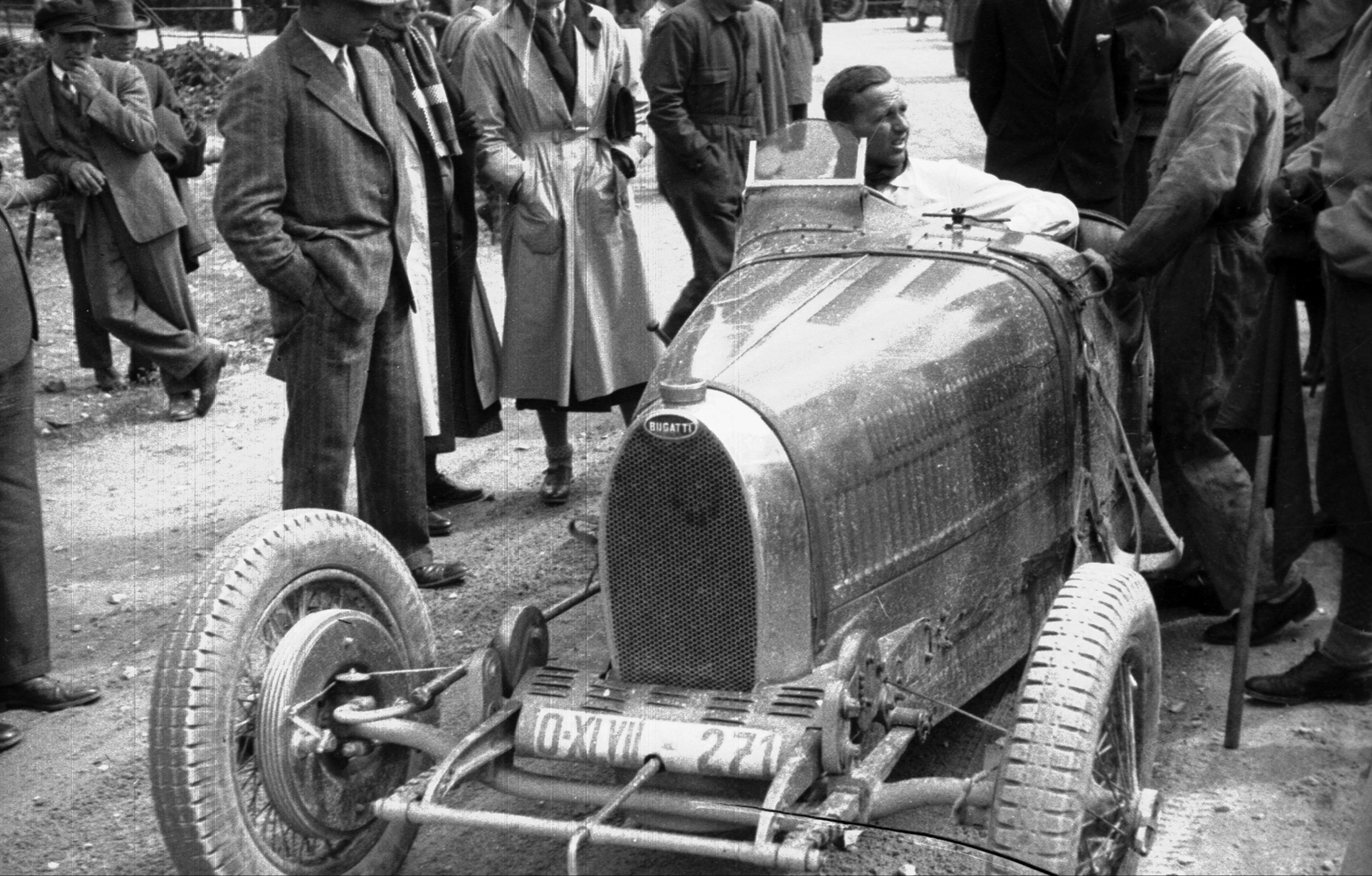
At the 1931 International Tatra Rally in Poland, in the Bugatti Type 37A previously belonging to Prince Lobkowitz

Pohl was the son of a sugar factory owner, and started racing on motorcycles in 1927 and was the first winner of the Golden Helmet of Pardubice in 1929, on an Indian Scout. His brother Jiři also raced.

In 1930, he struck up a friendship with Jiři Lobkowicz, a wealthy aristocrat who was racing on four wheels, and Lobkowicz handed over his old Bugatti Type 37A to Pohl to enter races with him; Pohl originally used the pseudonym Basul, to avoid family disapproval. In 1931 he adopted the pseudonym Hýta II - to match that of Lobkowicz - and made his international-class debit at the Zbraslav–Jíloviště hillclimb in May, finishing 13th, and winning the 1500cc class.

By 1932 Pohl was entering under his real name, and accompanied Lobkowicz to the 1932 Avusrennen, as Pohl was entered for the voiturette curtain-raiser; Pohl finished 4th, but Lobkowicz was killed in the main event in a Bugatti Type 54. Lobkowicz's mother gave Pohl the 54, which he converted to a sports car, and Pohl also took over Lobkowicz's Bugatti Type 51, which he used for racing purposes. He was awarded a silver badge by the Czechoslovak Automobile Club for his successes in the year, the first of several such awards.

Throughout the 1930s Pohl was rated as the best Czechoslovak driver, with successes at the Masaryk circuit, the Ecce Homo, Zlin, Zbraslav-Jíloviště, and Lochotin. In 1935 he enjoyed his greatest international success in winning the over 2 litre sportscar class at the 1935 German Mountain Championship, at the Schauinsland hillclimb, in the 51 - he notably beat all entrants in the 3 litre racing car category, and set the fifth-fastest overall time.

=== Rallying ===
He entered the Monte Carlo Rally twice, finishing second in the 1500cc class in 1936, driving a Ford Popular. He was runner-up in the Czechoslovak Mille Miglia in his MG Magnette in 1935, a defect at the last costing him victory.

=== Czech Grand Prix ===
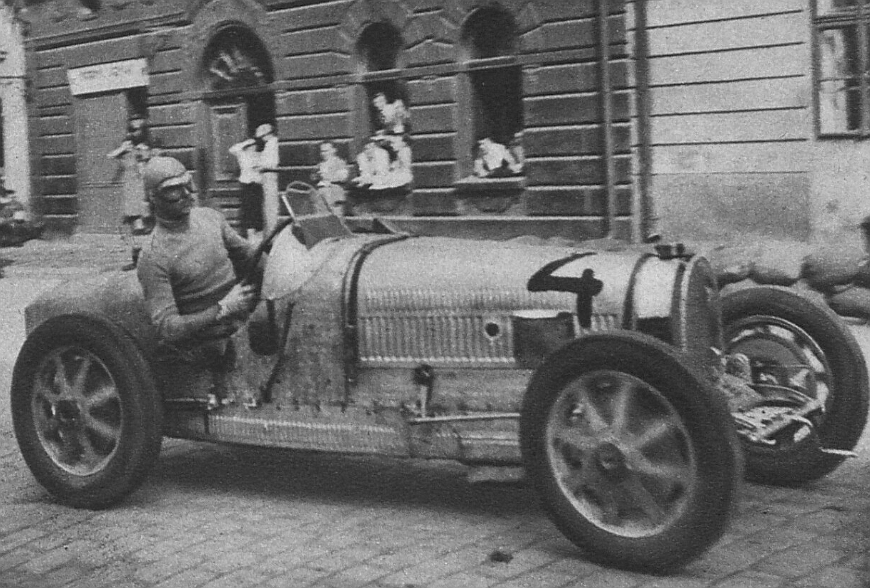
At the 1937 Masaryk Grand Prix

Pohl's sole Grand Prix formula races came in the Masaryk Grand Prix, the name given to what was in effect the Czechoslovak Grand Prix. At the 1933 event, in a Bugatti Type 35 entered under the name of Vladimir Gut (the Bugatti representative in Prague), Pohl entered the final stages of the race in a stunning third position, but a late pitstop to sort an engine issue dropped him to sixth. He struggled in the 1934 race with a clutch problem and retired.

For the 1935 and 1937 editions, Pohl took part in the voiturette classes, which ran concurrently with the Grand Prix cars, but completed 15 rather than 17 laps (Pohl entered the 51 in the Grand Prix category for Vladimir Gut, who retired on the second lap). Pohl drove his Magnette in both, and retired in both; his retirement in 1937 was from but a serious accident on the final lap, which put him in hospital. Some consolation came from the Czechoslovak Automobile Club awarding him a gold badge.

== Post-war racing ==
Pohl did not race again until 1946, and won the 1947 Prague Grand Prix at Vršovice in his venerable 51. However a crash in a race on the same circuit later in the year, which put him in a three-week coma, ended his career. Pohl was briefly owner of a Auto Union Type D, which found its way to the Soviet Union.
