= 1934 Spanish Grand Prix =

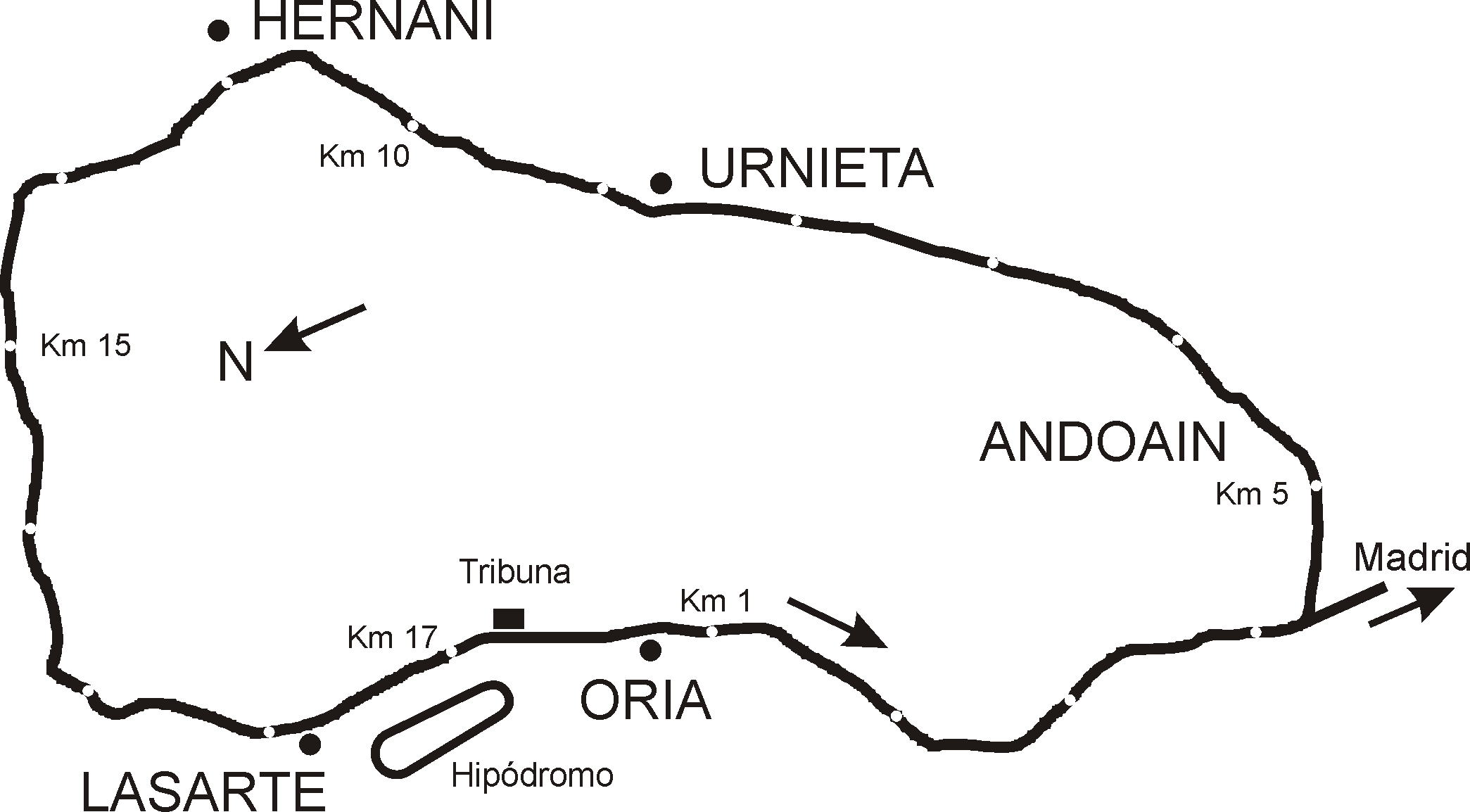
Lasarte, used for 1934 Spanish Grand Prix

The 1934 Spanish Grand Prix (formally the IX Gran Premio de España) was a Grand Prix motor race, which was run on 23 September 1934 in Lasarte, Spain. The race lasted 519.45 km (17.32 km x 30 laps). It was the 9th running of the Spanish Grand Prix.

== Starting grid (3x3) ==
Grid	No	Driver	Car	Note
1	2	(Germany) Rudolf Caracciola	Mercedes-Benz W25	
2	4	(France) Jean-Pierre Wimille	Bugatti T59	
3	6	(Germany) Hans Stuck	Auto Union A	
4	8	(Italy) Achille Varzi	Alfa Romeo Tipo-B P3	
5	10	(Italy) Luigi Soffietti	Alfa Romeo Monza	
6	12	(Italy) Tazio Nuvolari	Bugatti T59	
7	14	(France) René Dreyfus	Bugatti T59	
8	16	(Monaco) Louis Chiron	Alfa Romeo Tipo-B P3	
9	18	(Italy) Luigi Fagioli	Mercedes-Benz W25A	
10	20	(France) Marcel Lehoux	Maserati 8CM	
11	22	(Germany) Hermann zu Leiningen	Auto Union A	
12	24	(France) Robert Brunet	Maserati	
13	26	(France) Benoit Falchetto	Maserati	
14	28	(Italy) Antonio Brivio	Bugatti T59	
DNS	22	(Italy) Tazio Nuvolari	Auto Union A	Testing
DNS	30	(Norway) Eugen Bjørnstad	Alfa Romeo Monza	Car too heavy
DNS		(Germany) Ernst Henne	Mercedes-Benz W25A	Reserve, practiced

== Classification ==
Pos	No	Driver	Car	Laps	Time/Retire
1	18	(Italy) Luigi Fagioli	Mercedes-Benz W25A	30	3:19:41.6
2	2	(Germany) Rudolf Caracciola	Mercedes-Benz W25A	30	+43.8
3	12	(Italy) Tazio Nuvolari	Bugatti T59	30	+1:07.4
SHR	22	(Germany) Hermann zu Leiningen	Auto Union A	30	+1:22.4
SHR	22	(Germany) Hans Stuck	Auto Union A	30	+1:22.4
5	8	(Italy) Achille Varzi	Alfa Romeo Tipo-B P3	30	+2:08.5
6	4	(France) Jean-Pierre Wimille	Bugatti T59	29	+1 lap
7	14	(France) René Dreyfus	Bugatti T59	29	+1 lap
8	20	(France) Marcel Lehoux	Maserati 8CM	29	+1 lap
9	10	(Italy) Luigi Soffietti	Alfa Romeo Monza	29	+1 lap
SHR	16	(Monaco) Louis Chiron	Alfa Romeo Tipo-B P3	29	+1 lap
SHR	16	(Italy) Gianfranco Comotti	Alfa Romeo Tipo-B P3	29	+1 lap
11	28	(Italy) Antonio Brivio	Bugatti T59	28	+2 laps
Ret	24	(France) Robert Brunet	Maserati	25	Crash
Ret	26	(France) Benoit Falchetto	Maserati	23	Not classified
Ret	6	(Germany) Hans Stuck	Auto Union A	3	Oil pipe

Fastest Lap: (Germany) Hans Stuck (Auto Union A), 6:20.0

Grand Prix Race
Previous race: 1934 Italian Grand Prix	1934 Grand Prix season Grandes Épreuves	Next race: 1935 Monaco Grand Prix
Previous race: 1933 Spanish Grand Prix	Spanish Grand Prix	Next race: 1935 Spanish Grand Prix
