= Benoît Falchetto =

French racing driver (1900–83)

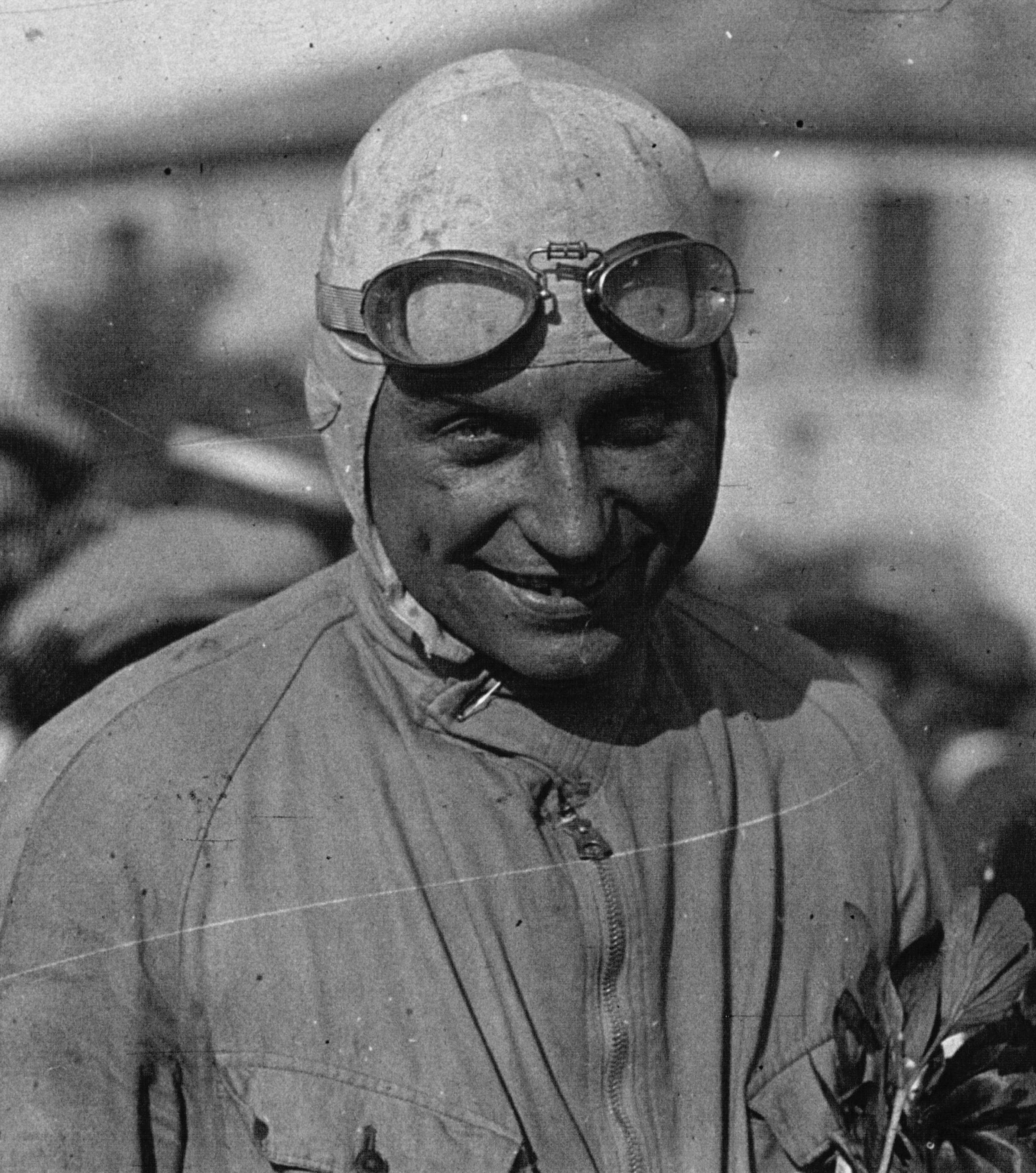
- Having won the Nîmes Grand Prix in 1932
- Born: Benoît Pierre Falchetto; 8 February 1900 Nice, France
- Died: 27 December 1983 (aged 83) Champcueil, France

Benoît Falchetto (8 February 1900 – 27 December 1983) was a French Grand Prix driver active either side of the Second World War.

== Early life ==
Born of Piedmontese parents, Falchetto was in the Italian forces during the First World War, before moving to become a mechanic and later dealer at the Amilcar company.

Falchetto first came to public attention in 1927 in tragic circumstances. The dancer Isadora Duncan, looking to buy a sportscar, prevailed upon Falchetto to give her a test drive in an Amilcar CGSS along the French Riviera. Duncan's long scarf caught in the wire wheels of the Amilcar and tightened around her neck, throwing her out of the car and killing her.

== Racing career ==
In 1928, Falchetto started his racing career, using the mononym "Benoît", in a Tony Spéciale cyclecar, finishing 2nd in the Circuit de la Riviera and 4th in the Antibes Grand Prix. However his licence was suspended in March 1929, after an incident at the Course du Côte du Domaine de Rothschild the previous month, for which he was held culpable. The Automobile Club de France lifted the suspension from 1 June 1930.

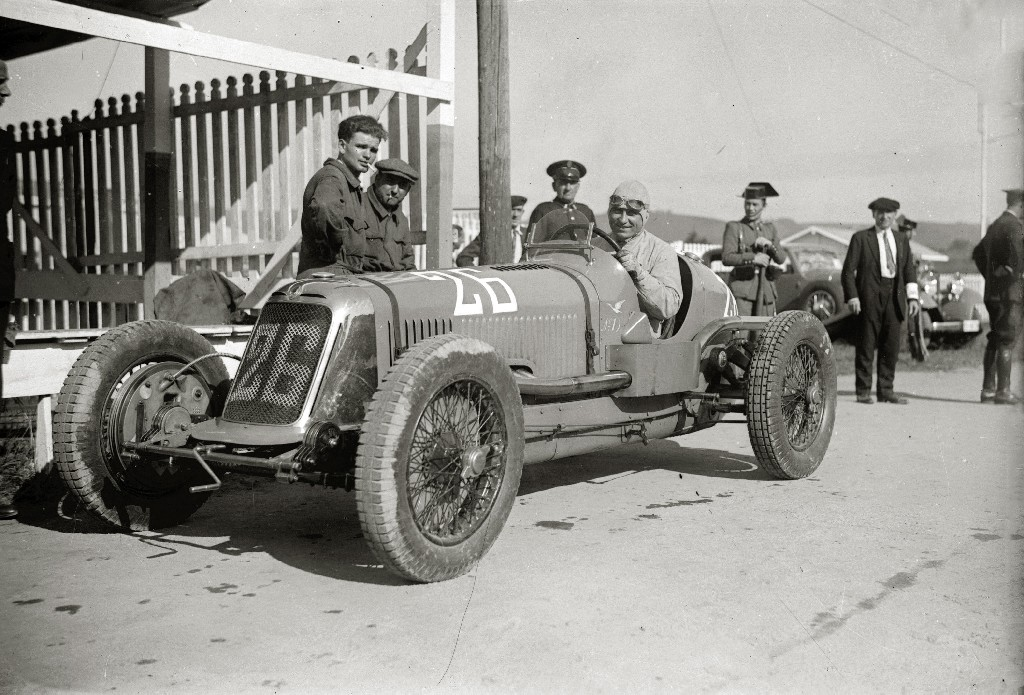
In a Maserati 6CM at the 1934 Spanish Grand Prixe

Falchetto's first achievement was a surprise win at the 1932 Nîmes Grand Prix in his Bugatti Type 51, a lap clear of René Dreyfus. In 1933 Falchetto formed Ecurie Braillard with Louis Braillard, the funds coming from Louis' sister Nelly. The pair variously raced Type 35Bs and 51s through the year, with Falchetto making his Grand Prix debut in the 1933 Monaco Grand Prix in a 51; he retired with 16 laps to go while lying 7th.

In 1934 the Ecurie bought Maserati 8CMs, with which Falchetto won the Grands Prix of Picardie and the Grand Prix de l'U.M.F. (the latter a race held at Montlhéry as part of a motorcycle racing meeting, under the auspices of the Union Motocycliste de France). He also took part in the 1934 Spanish Grand Prix, but, as he had done the previous year, retired early.

Falchetto retired from the sport in 1935, the Maseratis going to Hungarian nobleman Ernő Festetics, and the following year obtained a concession from the French government on the Marquesas Islands. After the Second World War, in which he was in the Résistance, he briefly returned to racing, taking part in his final Grand Epreuve at the 1947 Belgian Grand Prix (which also stood as the European Grand Prix that season) in an ancient Bugatti T35; he was the first retirement.
