= Czechoslovakian Grand Prix =

Motor race in Brno, Czechoslovakia

Coordinates: 49°07′17″N 16°15′50″E

- Masaryk Circuit, Brno

Race information
- Number of times held: 21
- First held: 1930
- Last held: 1988
- Most wins (drivers): Louis Chiron (3); Tom Walkinshaw (3)
- Most wins (constructors): BMW (6)
- Circuit length: 5.403 km (3.357 miles)
- Race length: 362 km (224.919 miles)
- Laps: 67

Last race (1988)

Pole position
- Mauro Baldi; Sauber–Mercedes-Benz; 1:46.440

Podium
- 1. J. Mass / J-L. Schlesser; Sauber–Mercedes-Benz; 2:06:40.620; 2. M. Brundle / J. Nielsen; Jaguar; +20.05; 3. J. Lammers / J. Dumfries; Jaguar; +1:08.27

Fastest lap
- Mauro Baldi; Sauber–Mercedes-Benz; 1:49.770

The Czechoslovakian Grand Prix (Czech: Velká cena Československa; Slovak: Veľká cena Československa) was a Grand Prix motor racing event held in 1949 at the Masaryk Circuit now referred to as the Brno Circuit. It was held in the town of Brno in Czechoslovakia (now the Czech Republic).

The Masaryk circuit race was first held on September 28, 1930. From 1934 onwards, the race was dominated by the German Silver Arrows. In 1937, several spectators were killed or injured when Hermann Lang skidded off the track. The spectators had been in a prohibited area but Lang was sued anyway.

Due to the German occupation in 1938 the race was discontinued until 1949 when the Masaryk Circuit was shortened to 17.8 km (11.1 mi).

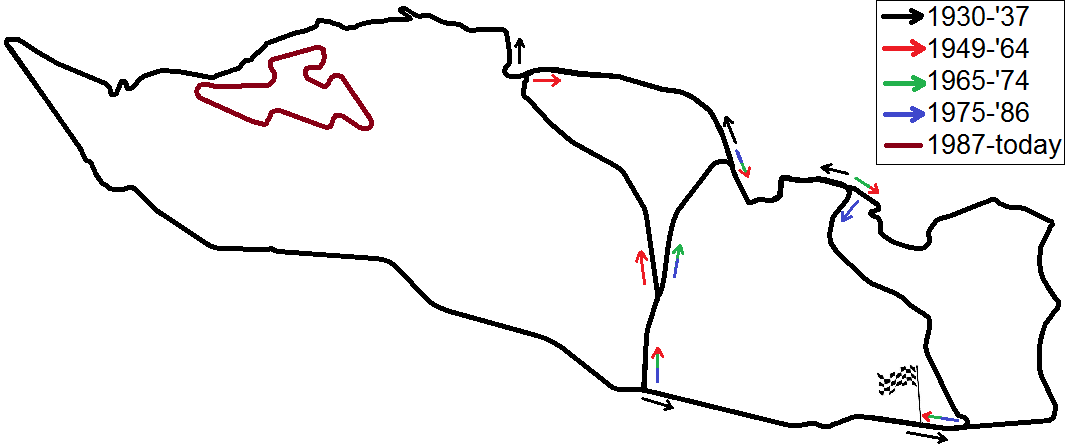
All layouts of the Masaryk Circuit (Brno Circuit) between 1930 and today combined

The 1949 Czechoslovakian Grand Prix raced in the opposite direction than the pre-war races, drew a crowd in excess of 400,000 people. The event was marred by the death of 2 drivers and 2 spectators. In 1950 the race was run as a national Libre event, won by Václav Hovorka in a Maserati.

26 years later a Czechoslovak Race was held at the same venue as a round of the European Touring Car Championship. BMW dominated for six years through various models before Jaguar asserted their own dominance. The race became part of the one-off 1987 World Touring Car Championship, but at a new venue, the newly constructed Brno Circuit. The race was won by the Swiss-based factory Ford team. A final race was held the following year as part of the World Sportscar Championship. The Sauber-Mercedes of Jochen Mass and Jean-Louis Schlesser prevented the Tom Walkinshaw team from claiming a fourth win for Jaguar.

== Winners ==
| Year | Driver | Car | Team | Location | Series | Length | Report |
|---|---|---|---|---|---|---|---|
| 1930 | (Germany) Heinrich-Joachim von Morgen, (Germany) Hermann of Leiningen | Bugatti T35B | Deutsches Bugatti Team | Masaryk Circuit | Non-championship | | Report |
| 1931 | (Monaco) Louis Chiron | Bugatti T51 | Automobiles Ettore Bugatti | Masaryk Circuit | Non-championship | | Report |
| 1932 | (Monaco) Louis Chiron | Bugatti T51 | Automobiles Ettore Bugatti | Masaryk Circuit | Non-championship | | Report |
| 1933 | (Monaco) Louis Chiron | Alfa Romeo B/P3 | Scuderia Ferrari | Masaryk Circuit | Non-championship | | Report |
| 1934 | (Germany) Hans Stuck | Auto Union Type A | Auto Union | Masaryk Circuit | Non-championship | | Report |
| 1935 | (Germany) Bernd Rosemeyer | Auto Union Type B | Auto Union | Masaryk Circuit | Non-championship | | Report |
| 1936 | Not held | | | | | | |
| 1937 | (Germany) Rudolf Caracciola | Mercedes-Benz W125 | Daimler-Benz | Masaryk Circuit | Non-championship | | Report |
| 1938 – 1948 | Not held | | | | | | |
| 1949 | (United Kingdom) Peter Whitehead | Ferrari 125 F1 | Peter Whitehead | Masaryk Circuit | Non-championship | | Report |
| 1950 | (Czechoslovakia) Václav Hovorka | Maserati 6CM | ? | Masaryk Circuit | Non-championship | | Report |
| 1951 – 1975 | Not held | | | | | | |
| 1976 | (Belgium) Jean Xhenceval, (Belgium) Pierre Dieudonné, (Italy) Umberto Grano | BMW 3.0 CSL | Luigi Racing | Masaryk Circuit | European Touring Car Championship | | Report |
| 1977 | (Italy) Carlo Facetti, (Italy) Martino Finotto | BMW 3.0 CSL | Luigi Racing | Masaryk Circuit | European Touring Car Championship | | Report |
| 1978 | (Italy) Carlo Facetti, (Italy) Martino Finotto | BMW 3.0 CSL | Jolly Club Milano | Masaryk Circuit | European Touring Car Championship | | Report |
| 1979 | (Belgium) Raymond Van Hove, (Belgium) Jean Xhenceval, (Belgium) Pierre Dieudonné | BMW 3.0 CSL | Luigi Racing | Masaryk Circuit | European Touring Car Championship | | Report |
| 1980 | (West Germany) Helmut Kelleners, (West Germany) Siegfried Müller Jr. | BMW 320 | Eggenberger Motorsport | Masaryk Circuit | European Touring Car Championship | | Report |
| 1981 | (Italy) Umberto Grano, (West Germany) Helmut Kelleners | BMW 635 CSi | Eggenberger Motorsport | Masaryk Circuit | European Touring Car Championship | | Report |
| 1982 | (United Kingdom) Tom Walkinshaw, (United Kingdom) Chuck Nicholson | Jaguar XJ-S | Team Motul Jaguar | Masaryk Circuit | European Touring Car Championship | | Report |
| 1983 | (United Kingdom) Tom Walkinshaw, (United Kingdom) Chuck Nicholson | Jaguar XJ-S | TWR Jaguar Racing | Masaryk Circuit | European Touring Car Championship | | Report |
| 1984 | (United Kingdom) Tom Walkinshaw, (West Germany) Hans Heyer | Jaguar XJ-S | TWR Jaguar Racing | Masaryk Circuit | European Touring Car Championship | | Report |
| 1985 | (Sweden) Ulf Granberg, (Sweden) Anders Olofsson | Volvo 240 Turbo | Magnum Racing | Masaryk Circuit | European Touring Car Championship | | Report |
| 1986 | (Sweden) Ulf Granberg, (Sweden) Thomas Lindström | Volvo 240 Turbo | RAS Sport | Masaryk Circuit | European Touring Car Championship | | Report |
| 1987 | (West Germany) Klaus Ludwig, (West Germany) Klaus Niedzwiedz | Ford Sierra RS500 | Eggenberger Motorsport | Masaryk Circuit | World Touring Car Championship | | Report |
| 1988 | (West Germany) Jochen Mass, (France) Jean-Louis Schlesser | Sauber C9 | Team Sauber Mercedes | Masaryk Circuit | World Sportscar Championship | 360 km (220 mi) | Report |
| 1989 – 1996 | Not held | | | | | | |
| 1997 | (Italy) Arturo Merzario | Centenari M1-Alfa Romeo | (Italy) Symbol Team | Masaryk Circuit | International Sports Racing Series | 30 Minutes | Report |
