= Louis Chiron =

Monégasque racing driver (1899–1979)

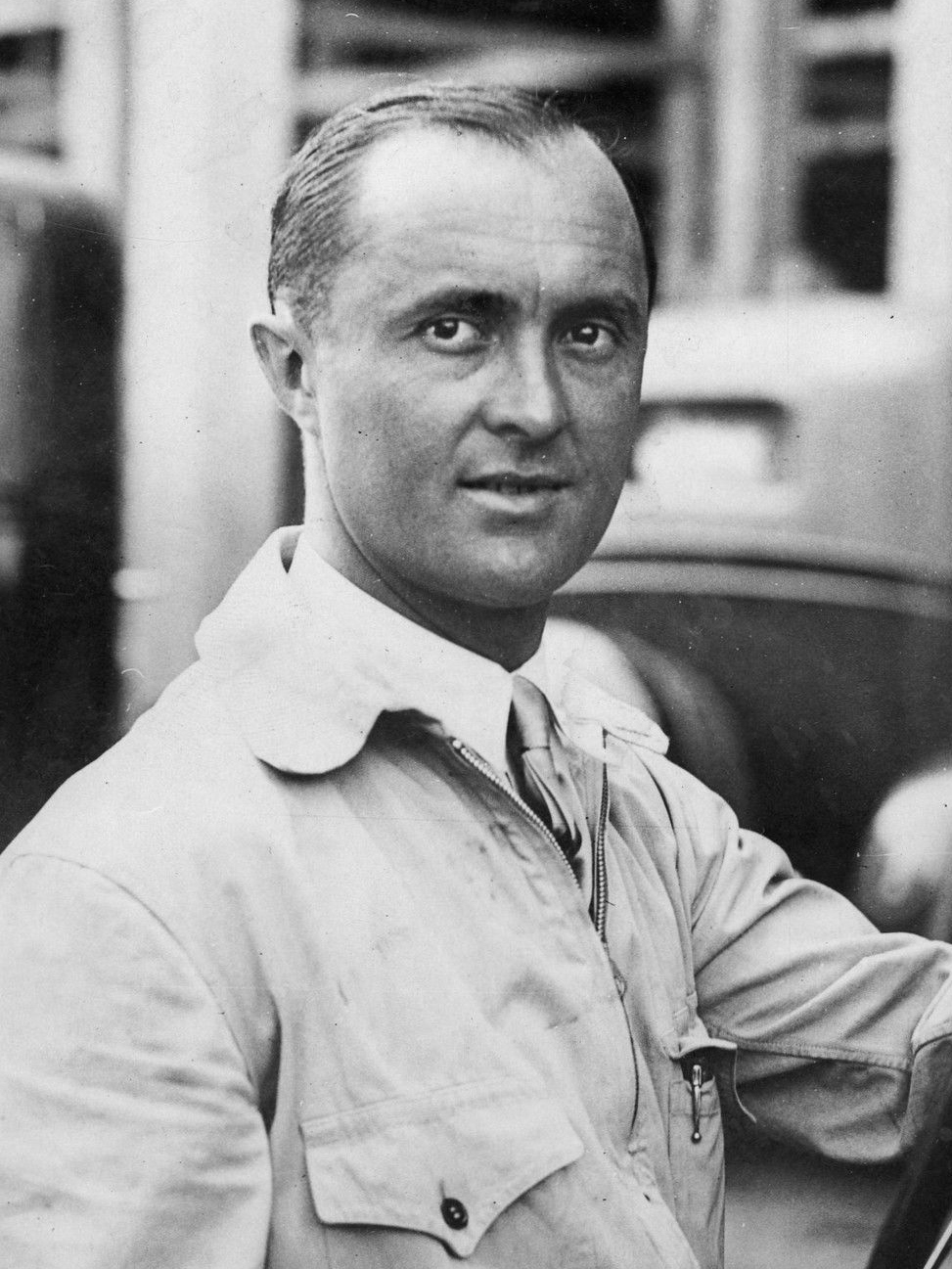
- Chiron in 1931
- Born: Louis Alexandre Chiron; 3 August 1899 Monte Carlo, Monaco
- Died: 22 June 1979 (aged 79) Monte Carlo, Monaco

Formula One World Championship career
- Nationality: (Monaco) Monégasque
- Active years: 1950–1951, 1953, 1955–1956, 1958
- Team(s): Maserati (works and non-works), Talbot-Lago, O.S.C.A., Lancia
- Entries: 19 (15 starts)
- Championships: 0
- Wins: 0
- Podiums: 1
- Career points: 4
- Pole positions: 0
- Fastest laps: 0
- First entry: 1950 British Grand Prix
- Last entry: 1958 Monaco Grand Prix

Champ Car career
- 1 race run over 1 year
- First race: 1929 Indianapolis 500 (Indianapolis)
Wins	Podiums	Poles
0	0	0

24 Hours of Le Mans career
- Years: 1928–1929, 1931–1933, 1937–1938, 1951, 1953
- Teams: Chrysler, Weymann, Bugatti, Bouriat, privateer, Chinetti, Ecurie Bleue, Lancia
- Best finish: DNF (1929, 1931, 1932, 1933, 1937, 1938, 1953)
- Class wins: 0

Louis Alexandre Chiron (French pronunciation: [lwi ʃi.ʁɔ̃]; 3 August 1899 – 22 June 1979) was a Monégasque racing driver who competed in rallies, sports car races, and Grands Prix.

Among the greatest drivers between the two World Wars, his career spanned more than thirty years, starting in 1923, and ending at the end of the 1950s. He is still the oldest driver ever to have started a race in the Formula One World Championship, having taken sixth place in the 1955 Monaco Grand Prix when he was 55. Three years later, he became the oldest driver to enter a Formula One race, at 58. The Bugatti Chiron takes its name from him. Until 2024, when Charles Leclerc matched his achievement, he was the only Monegasque driver to have won the Monaco Grand Prix.

== Early life and career ==
Coming from a family of wine-growers, Louis Chiron's father gained employment as a butler in the Hôtel de Paris at Monaco. As a teenager, Louis was employed as a bellboy at the hotel, and his interest in cars and racing started at that time. During World War I, he was seconded from an artillery regiment as a driver for Maréchal Pétain and Maréchal Foch, thanks to his persistence and a driving license financed by a Russian duchess he met at the hotel.

Employed as a dancer after World War I, Chiron's racing career started in 1923, after a rich American woman he was friends with bought him a second hand Bugatti Brescia. He started in local hillclimbs, and moved to Grand Prix racing in 1926, after getting a Bugatti T35, and befriending rich industrialist Alfred Hoffman. He won the Grand Prix du Comminges that year, at Saint-Gaudens, near Toulouse.

== Driving career ==
Starting in 1928, Chiron became a Bugatti factory driver in parallel to his role in Hoffman's private team. During that period, he became one of the dominant drivers in Grand Prix racing. He took major victories at the 1928 Italian Grand Prix, 1929 German Grand Prix, and 1930 Belgian Grand Prix. In the Indianapolis 500 of 1929, he drove a Delage to seventh place. He won the 1931 Monaco Grand Prix and 1931 French Grand Prix in a Bugatti T51.

Chiron's partnership with Hoffman ended in the early 1930s after he was found having an affair with his wife Alice. He was also fired from Bugatti's factory team at the end of 1932. He then founded with his friend Rudolf Caracciola a new team, called Scuderia CC. At the team's first race, the 1933 Monaco Grand Prix, Caracciola had a season ending accident, and Chiron switched to Alfa Romeo cars run by Scuderia Ferrari mid-season. He won the 1933 Spa 24 hours race with specialist endurance racer Luigi Chinetti in an Alfa Romeo 8C 2300 Monza.

Chiron drove an Alfa Romeo P3 run by Ferrari for the 1934 Grand Prix season. He won the 1934 French Grand Prix at Montlhéry, against several works Mercedes-Benz and Auto Union entries, a race that is often considered one of the greatest victories of his career. The Alfa Romeos struggled against the German cars in 1935, and Chiron only salvaged a podium at the 1935 Belgian Grand Prix and a minor victory at the Lorraine Grand Prix that year.

Chiron moved to Mercedes-Benz's factory team for the 1936 Grand Prix season. He started the European championship campaign with a pole at his home race of Monaco, but his race ended after an accident on lap one. A more serious accident at the second round, the 1936 German Grand Prix, left him with head and shoulders injuries. He decided to retire from Grand Prix racing after that. He won the 1937 French Grand Prix, a race that was run for sports cars only that year.

Chiron retired from racing in 1938, and World War II curtailed motor racing a year later. When racing resumed after the War, he came out of retirement and drove a Talbot-Lago to victory in two French Grands Prix.

According to a Los Angeles Times review of fellow driver Hellé Nice's biography, Chiron accused her, at a 1949 party in Monaco to celebrate the first postwar Monte Carlo Rally, of "collaborating with the Nazis". The review says biographer Miranda Seymour is "circumspect on Nice's guilt". A review of the same book in The New York Times says Nice was accused of being a "Gestapo agent"; that Seymour "rebuts" the charge; and that it made Nice "unemployable". Seymour's book says that in a letter to Antony Noghes, the head of the Monte Carlo Rally committee, Hellé Nice "protested her innocence"; that she told him she would appeal to the Monaco court unless Chiron wrote an apology; that no letter from Chiron has been found; and that the court has no record of such a case between 1949 and 1955. Modern investigations have found no evidence to collaborate Chiron's claims.

Chiron took part in the first ever Formula One World Championship season in 1950, as a factory Maserati driver. At his home Grand Prix of Monaco, he finished in third, at age 50, the only points scoring finish of his career.

Paired with the Swiss driver Ciro Basadonna, Chiron won the 1954 Monte Carlo Rally. His last race was in 1955, when he took a Lancia D50 to sixth place in the Monaco Grand Prix a few weeks before his 56th birthday, becoming the oldest driver to compete in a Formula One race. He is also the oldest driver ever to have entered for a Formula One race, taking part in practice for the 1958 Monaco Grand Prix when he was 58.

== Later life and legacy ==
Chiron retired after 35 years in racing but maintained an executive role with the organizers of the Monaco Grand Prix, who honoured him with a statue on the Grand Prix course and renamed the Swimming Pool corner after him. As he had achieved the greatest number of podium finishes in Bugattis, the 1999 Bugatti 18/3 Chiron concept car and the 2016 Bugatti Chiron are named in his honour.

Chiron was so popular in Czechoslovakia, whose Grand Prix he won three consecutive times, that even after 75 years his name still lives in a popular saying "He drives like Chiron", used mainly when referring to speeding motorists or generally to people who drive very quickly.

Chiron was the only Monegasque driver to score points in a Formula One race until Charles Leclerc did so at the 2018 Azerbaijan Grand Prix, the only one to achieve a podium until Leclerc at the 2019 Bahrain Grand Prix, and the only Monegasque to win the Monaco Grand Prix until Leclerc’s victory in the 2024 Monaco Grand Prix.

== Motorsports career results ==
=== Major career victories ===
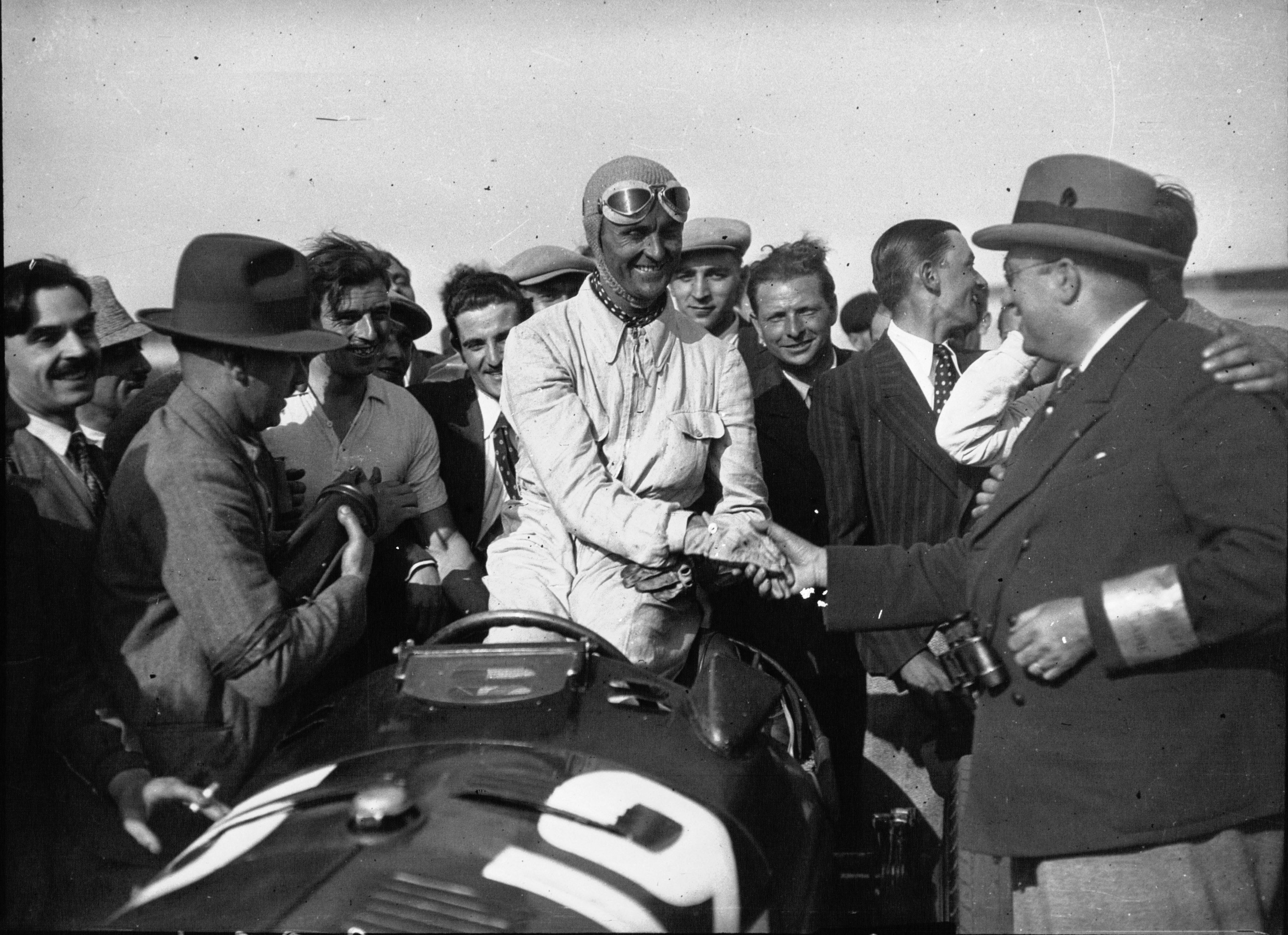
Chiron after winning the 1934 French Grand Prix

- Belgian Grand Prix – 1930
- Czechoslovakian Grand Prix – 1931, 1932, 1933
- French Grand Prix – 1931, 1934, 1937, 1947, 1949
- German Grand Prix – 1929
- Italian Grand Prix – 1928
- Spanish Grand Prix – 1928, 1929, 1933
- Monaco Grand Prix – 1931
- Moroccan Grand Prix– 1934
- Grand Prix du Comminges – 1947
- Grand Prix de Marseilles – 1933
- Grand Prix de Nice – 1932
- Spa 24 hours – 1933
- Rome Grand Prix – 1928
- Marne Grand Prix – 1928
- Monte Carlo Rally – 1954

=== Complete European Championship results ===
(key) (Races in bold indicate pole position; races in italics indicate fastest lap.)

Year	Entrant	Chassis	Engine	1	2	3	4	5	6	7	EDC	Pts
1931	Automobiles Ettore Bugatti	Bugatti T51	Bugatti 2.3 L8	ITA; Ret	FRA; 1	BEL; Ret					6th	13
1932	Automobiles Ettore Bugatti	Bugatti T54	Bugatti 5.0 L8	ITA; Ret							5th	17
1932	Automobiles Ettore Bugatti	Bugatti T51	Bugatti 2.3 L8		FRA; 4	GER; Ret					5th	17
1935	Scuderia Ferrari	Alfa Romeo Tipo B/P3	Alfa Romeo 2.9 L8	MON; 5							10th	40
1935	Scuderia Ferrari	Alfa Romeo Tipo B/P3	Alfa Romeo 3.2 L8		FRA; Ret	BEL; 3	GER; Ret	SUI; Ret	ITA	ESP; Ret	10th	40
1936	Daimler-Benz AG	Mercedes W25K	Mercedes ME25 4.7 L8	**MON**; Ret	GER; Ret	SUI	ITA				18th	28

=== Post-WWII Grandes Épreuves results ===
(key) (Races in bold indicate pole position; races in italics indicate fastest lap.)

Year	Entrant	Chassis	Engine	1	2	3	4	5
1947	Ecurie Auto-Sport	Maserati 4CL	Maserati 4CL 1.5 L4s	SUI; 13				
1947	Ecurie France	Talbot-Lago MC	Talbot 4.5 L6		BEL; Ret		FRA; 1	
1947	Enrico Platé	Maserati 4CL	Maserati 4CL 1.5 L4s			ITA; Ret		
1948	Ecurie France	Talbot-Lago MC	Talbot 4.5 L6	MON; 2	SUI; 6	FRA; 9	ITA; Ret	
1949	Ecurie France	Talbot-Lago T26C	Talbot 23CV 4.5 L6	GBR; Ret	BEL	SUI	FRA; 1	ITA

=== Complete Formula One World Championship results ===
(key)

Year	Entrant	Chassis	Engine	1	2	3	4	5	6	7	8	9	10	11	WDC	Pts
1950	Officine Alfieri Maserati	Maserati 4CLT/48	Maserati 4CLT 1.5 L4s	GBR; Ret	MON; 3	500	SUI; 9	BEL	FRA; Ret	ITA; Ret					10th	4
1951	Enrico Platé	Maserati 4CLT/48	Maserati 4CLT 1.5 L4s	SUI; 7	500										NC	0
1951	Ecurie Rosier	Talbot-Lago T26C	Talbot 23CV 4.5 L6			BEL; Ret	FRA; 6	GBR; Ret	GER; Ret	ITA; Ret	ESP; Ret				NC	0
1953	Louis Chiron	OSCA 20	OSCA 2000 2.0 L6	ARG	500	NED	BEL	FRA; 15	GBR; DNS	GER	SUI; DNS	ITA; 10			NC	0
1955	Scuderia Lancia	Lancia D50	Lancia DS50 2.5 V8	ARG	MON; 6	500	BEL	NED	GBR	ITA					NC	0
1956	Scuderia Centro Sud	Maserati 250F	Maserati 250F1 2.5 L6	ARG	MON; DNS	500	BEL	FRA	GBR	GER	ITA				NC	0
1958	André Testut	Maserati 250F	Maserati 250F1 2.5 L6	ARG	MON; DNQ	NED	500	BEL	FRA	GBR	GER	POR	ITA	MOR	NC	0

=== Indianapolis 500 results ===
Year	Car	Start	Qual	Rank	Finish	Laps	Led	Retired
1929	6	14	107.351	26	7	200	0	Running
**Totals**						200	0	

Starts	1
Poles	0
Front Row	0
Wins	0
Top 5	0
Top 10	1
Retired	0

=== 24 Hours of Le Mans results ===
Year	Team	Co-Drivers	Car	Class	Laps	Pos.	Class Pos.
1928	No Team Name	(France) Cyril de Vere	Chrysler Six Series 72	5.0	66	DSQ	DSQ
1929	(France) C. T. Weymann	(France) Édouard Brisson	Stutz DV32	8.0	65	DNF	DNF
1931	(France) Equipe Bugatti	(Italy) Achille Varzi	Bugatti Type 50S	5.0	24	DNF	DNF
1932	(France) Guy Bouriat	(France) Guy Bouriat	Bugatti Type 55	3.0	23	DNF	DNF
1933	(Monaco) L. Chiron	(Italy) Franco Cortese	Alfa Romeo 8C 2300MM	3.0	177	DNF	DNF
1937	(Italy) Luigi Chinetti	(Italy) Luigi Chinetti	Talbot T150C	5.0	7	DNF	DNF
1938	(France) Ecurie Bleue	(France) René Dreyfus	Delahaye 145	5.0	21	DNF	DNF
1951	(United States) Luigi Chinetti	(France) Pierre-Louis Dreyfus	Ferrari 340 America Barchetta	S 5.0	29	DSQ	DSQ
1953	(Italy) Scuderia Lancia	(France) Robert Manzon	Lancia D20	S 8.0	174	DNF	DNF
