= Pole position =

First position on a motor-racing starting grid

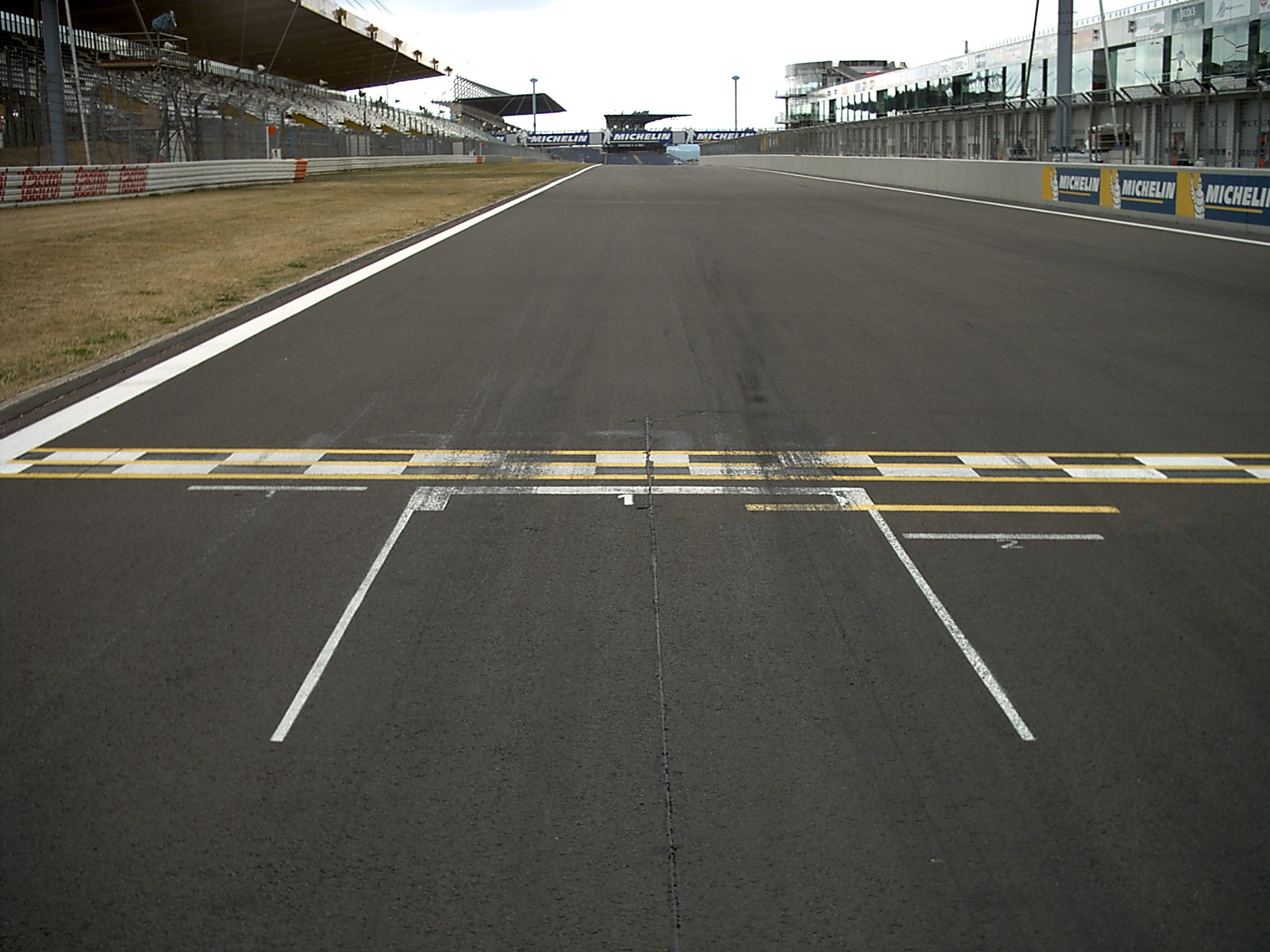
Pole position markings at the Nürburgring in Germany. The checkered line above it is the circuit's start/finish line.

In a motorsports race, pole position is the best position on the track at the start and thus, by definition, the participant in pole position is starting it from first place.

As having pole position is extremely advantageous in most forms of motorsport, the pole position is usually earned by a driver via another competitive method. Most often, this is by having the best qualifying times in timed trials before the race that determine the order of the starting grid, though it can also be awarded in other circumstances (such as current position in the series' championship, the results of a previous race, the drawing of lots, or a reversed grid). The driver in pole position is referred to as the pole-sitter.

== Origin ==
The term has its origins in horse racing, in which the fastest qualifying horse would be placed on the inside part of the course, next to the pole marking the start line for the race.

== Determination methods ==
Grid position is typically determined by a qualifying session before the race, where race participants compete to ascend to the number 1 grid slot, the driver, pilot, or rider having recorded fastest qualification time awarded the advantage of the number 1 grid slot (i.e., the pole-position) ahead of all other vehicles for the start of the race. Historically, the fastest qualifier was not necessarily the designated pole-sitter. Different sanctioning bodies in motor sport employ different qualifying formats in designating who starts from pole position. Often, a starting grid is derived either by current rank in the championship, or based on finishing position of a previous race. In particularly important events where multiple qualification attempts spanned several days, the qualification result was segmented or staggered, by which session a driver qualified, or by which particular day a driver set his qualification time, only drivers having qualified on the initial day were eligible for pole position.

Some race promoters or sanctioning bodies invert the starting grid, or part of the starting grid, for the purpose of entertainment value (e.g., pack racing; to artificially stimulate passing). An example of a series that does this is the British Touring Car Championship, which reverses the grid for each third race based on a lottery determining how many positions are reversed.

== Formula One ==
Originally in Grand Prix racing, grid positions, including pole, were determined by lottery among the drivers. Before the inception of the Formula One World Championship, the first instance of grid positions being determined by qualifying times was at the 1933 Monaco Grand Prix. Since then, the FIA have introduced many different qualifying systems to Formula One. From the long-standing system of one session on each of Friday and Saturday, to the current knockout-style qualifying leaving 10 out of 22 drivers to battle for pole, there have been many changes to qualifying systems. Between 1996 and 2006, the FIA made 6 significant changes to the qualifying procedure, each with the intention of making the battle for pole more interesting to viewers at home.

Traditionally, pole was always occupied by the fastest driver due to low-fuel qualifying. The race-fuel qualifying era between 2003 and 2009 briefly changed this. Despite the changing formats, drivers attempting pole were required between 2003 and 2009 to do qualifying laps with the fuel they would use to start the race the next day. An underfuelled slower car and driver would therefore be able to take pole ahead of a better but heavier-fueled car. In this situation, pole was not always advantageous to have in the race as the under-fueled driver would have to pit for more fuel before their rivals. With the race refueling ban introduced, low-fuel qualifying returned and these strategy decisions are no longer in play.

Also, when Formula One enforced the 107% rule between 1996 and 2002, a driver's pole time might affect slower cars also posting times for qualifying, as cars that could not get within 107% of the pole time were not allowed start the race unless the stewards decided otherwise. Since the reintroduction of the rule in 2011, this only applies to the quickest time in the first session of qualifying (Q1) and not the pole time.

=== Top ten most Formula One pole positions ===
As of the 2026 Mexico City Grand Prix

**Bold**	Driver has competed in the 2026 season

	Driver	Poles
1	(United Kingdom) **Lewis Hamilton**	104
2	(Germany) Michael Schumacher	68
3	(Brazil) Ayrton Senna	65
4	(Germany) Sebastian Vettel	57
5	(Netherlands) **Max Verstappen**	50
6	(United Kingdom) Jim Clark	33
6	(France) Alain Prost	33
8	(United Kingdom) Nigel Mansell	32
9	(Germany) Nico Rosberg	30
10	(Argentina) Juan Manuel Fangio	29

=== Pole position trophy ===
From 2014, the FIA awarded a trophy to the driver who won the most pole positions in a Formula One season. In 2018, the FIA Pole Trophy was discontinued and replaced with the Pirelli Pole Position Award, where the polesitter at each race as awarded a Pirelli wind tunnel tyre with the name of the polesitter and their time. A whole-season trophy was awarded in 2018 and 2019, but discontinued from 2020 onwards.

Year	Winner	Team	Chassis	Pole positions
2014	(Germany) Nico Rosberg	(Germany) Mercedes	F1 W05 Hybrid	11
2015	(United Kingdom) Lewis Hamilton **(WC)**	(Germany) Mercedes	F1 W06 Hybrid	11
2016	(United Kingdom) Lewis Hamilton	(Germany) Mercedes	F1 W07 Hybrid	12
2017	(United Kingdom) Lewis Hamilton **(WC)**	(Germany) Mercedes	F1 W08 EQ Power+	11
2018	(United Kingdom) Lewis Hamilton **(WC)**	(Germany) Mercedes	F1 W09 EQ Power+	11
2019	(Monaco) Charles Leclerc	(Italy) Ferrari	SF90	7

(WC) indicates that the driver won the World Championship in the same season.

== IndyCar ==
IndyCar uses four formats for qualifying: one for most oval tracks, one for Iowa Speedway, one for the Indianapolis 500, and another for road and street circuits. Oval qualifying is almost like the Indianapolis 500, with two laps, instead of four, averaged together with one attempt, although with just one session.

At Iowa, each car takes one qualifying lap, and the top six cars advance to the feature race for the pole position. Positions from 7th onward are assigned to their races, based on time, with cars in the odd-numbered finishing order starting in one race, and cars in the even-numbered finishing order starting in the second race. The finishing order for the odd-numbered race starts on the inside, starting in Row 6 (11th), and even-numbered race on the outside based on finishing position, again from Row 6 (12th), except for the top two in each race, which start in the inside and outside, respectively (Row 4 and 5) of the race for the pole position. The result of the feature race determines positions 1–10. All three races are 50 laps.

On road and street courses, cars are drawn randomly into two qualifying groups. After each group has one twenty-minute session, the top six cars from each group qualify for a second session. The cars that finished seventh or worse are lined up by their times, with the best of these times starting 13th. The twelve remaining cars run a 15-minute session, after which the top six cars move on to a final 10-minute session to determine positions one through six on the grid.

The Iowa format was instituted in 2012 with major modifications (times set based on open qualifying session in second practice, positions 11th and back in odd positions raced in the inside heat, positions 12th and back in even positions raced in the outside heat, and positions 1–10 raced for the pole, each heat 30 laps), and non-Iowa oval format in August 2010, while the Indianapolis format was in 2010. The road course format was installed for 2008. In prior seasons, oval qualifying ran for four laps, Indianapolis-style, from 2008, and previously two laps with the best lap used for qualification. Street and road circuits used a two-phase format similar to oval qualifying except that cars took one qualifying lap, then the top six advanced to the ten-minute session for the pole.

=== Indianapolis 500 ===
The pole position for the Indianapolis 500 is determined on the first day (or first full round) of time trials. Cars run four consecutive laps (10 miles), and the total elapsed time on the four laps determines the positioning. The fastest car on the first day of time trials wins the pole position. Times recorded in earlier days (rounds) start ahead of subsequent days (rounds). A driver could record a time faster than that of the pole winner on a subsequent day; however, he will be required to line up behind the previous day(s)' qualifiers.

Starting in 2010, the first day is split into Q1 and Q2. At the end of Q1, positions 10–24 are set. The top nine cars will then have their times wiped out and advance to Q2 where cars will have 90 minutes to run for pole. If inclement weather causes officials to cancel Q2, positions 1–24 are set. If inclement weather in Q1 is early where Q2 is late (past 6 PM usually), drivers will have only one attempt in Q2.

== Grand Prix motorcycle racing ==
Since 2006, there has been one hour-long session on Saturday where the riders have an unlimited number of laps to record a fast lap time. Simply, the rider with the fastest lap gains pole position for the race.

In 2013 a new format was introduced whereby qualifying is conducted over two 15-minute sessions labelled Q1 and Q2. The fastest 10 riders over combined practice times advance automatically to Q2, while the rest of the field competes in Q1. At the conclusion of Q1 the fastest 2 riders progress to Q2 with a chance to further improve their grid position.

In 2023 a new format was introduced where the results of qualifying set the grid for a Saturday Sprint Race as well as the Sunday Grand Prix Race.

=== Top ten riders in Grand Prix motorcycle racing with most pole positions ===
As of 24 October 2026

**Bold**	Rider still competing in Grand Prix motorcycle racing as of the 2026 season

	Rider	Poles
1	(Spain) **Marc Márquez**	106
2	(Spain) Jorge Lorenzo	69
3	(Italy) Valentino Rossi	65
4	(Australia) Mick Doohan	58
5	(Italy) Max Biaggi	56
6	(Spain) Dani Pedrosa	49
7	(Spain) **Jorge Martín**	45
8	(Australia) Casey Stoner	43
9	(Italy) Loris Capirossi	41
10	(Italy) **Francesco Bagnaia**	35

== NASCAR ==
Before 2001, NASCAR used a two-day qualifying format in its national series. Before 2002 only one lap was run on oval tracks except short tracks and restrictor plate tracks. Until 2014, the pole position has been determined by a two-lap time trial (one lap on road courses) with the faster lap time used as the driver's qualifying speed. In 2014, NASCAR used a knockout qualifying format for all races except the Daytona 500, non-points races, and the Truck Series' Eldora Dirt Derby: after a 25-minute session (on tracks longer than 1.25 miles (2.01 km); tracks shorter than 1.25 miles have a 30-minute session), the 24 fastest cars advance to a ten-minute session, with the top 12 advancing to a final five-minute session. Starting in 2003, if a driver's team changed their car's engine after the qualifying segment was over, the car would be relegated to the rear of the 43-car field. In the case of multiple teams changing engines on the same weekend after a qualifying segment (although this is a rare occurrence), qualifying times from that segment are used to determine the starting order for those cars.

In the Eldora Dirt Derby, practice runs are held, which determine the starting grids for five heat races of eight laps each. The top five fastest qualifiers started on pole for each heat, and the winner of the first heat is awarded the pole for the feature race.

=== Top ten most Cup Series pole positions ===
As of 26 October 2024

**Bold**	Driver still competing in the Cup Series as of the 2024 season

	Driver	Poles
1	(United States) Richard Petty	123
2	(United States) David Pearson	113
3	(United States) Jeff Gordon	81
4	(United States) Cale Yarborough	69
5	(United States) Bobby Allison	59
5	(United States) Darrell Waltrip	59
7	(United States) Mark Martin	56
8	(United States) Bill Elliott	55
9	(United States) Ryan Newman	51
10	(United States) Bobby Isaac	48

=== Top ten most Xfinity Series pole positions ===
As of 26 October 2024

**Bold**	Driver still competing in the Xfinity Series as of the 2024 season

	Driver	Poles
1	(United States) **Kyle Busch**	70
2	(United States) Joey Logano	36
3	(United States) Mark Martin	30
4	(United States) Tommy Ellis	28
5	(United States) Carl Edwards	27
6	(United States) Kevin Harvick	25
7	(United States) Sam Ard	24
8	**(United States)** Jeff Green	23
9	(United States) David Green	22
9	(United States) Brad Keselowski	22

=== Top ten most Truck Series pole positions ===
As of 26 October 2024

**Bold**	Driver still competing in the Truck Series as of the 2024 season

	Driver	Poles
1	(United States) Mike Skinner	50
2	(United States) Jack Sprague	32
3	(United States) Ron Hornaday Jr.	27
4	(United States) **Kyle Busch**	22
5	(United States) Mike Bliss	18
6	(United States) Joe Ruttman	17
7	(United States) **Matt Crafton**	16
8	(United States) Austin Dillon	13
9	(United States) Greg Biffle	12
9	(United States) Ted Musgrave	12

== Superbike ==
Superpole for Superbike is a timed event to establish starting positions for motorcycle racers in World Superbike races.

For 2023 a World Superbike weekend typically consists of:

- Friday – Two Free Practice sessions.
- Saturday – Free Practice, Superpole, WorldSBK Race 1, WorldSSP300 Last Chance Race.
- Sunday – Warm-up, WorldSBK Superpole Race, World SSP Race, WorldSBK Race 2, WorldSSP300 Race

1. The final results of the Superpole decide the grid for WorldSBK Race One and Sunday's (sprint) Superpole Race.
2. The top six finishers of the "last chance race" take the final six spots of the WorldSSP300 race starting grid.
3. The grid for WorldSBK Race 2 will be determined from the first nine positions in the Superpole Race, and the grid from 10th onwards will be the positions from Saturday's Superpole.

The format of Superpole depends on weather conditions:

- Dry Superpole: The race director declares a 'dry' Superpole (referring to the weather conditions) then Superpole will consist of 3 laps of the circuit. Riders start one by one in reverse qualifying order. Grid position for the races will be determined by each rider's fastest single lap time.
- Wet Superpole: If Superpole is declared 'wet', Superpole will consist of 50 minutes of timed laps, for all 15 riders together, during which a rider may complete up to 12 laps (including in and out laps). Grid position for the races will be determined by each rider's fastest single lap time. For each lap over 12 laps completed, the rider's best lap time will be cancelled.

To qualify for the race, riders must record a lap time no longer than 107% of the time recorded by the pole-position rider. Qualifying tires may be used.

== Radio-controlled racing ==
In radio-controlled car racing, the term Top Qualifier (TQ) is used to determine the fastest qualifying driver, usually over a two-day, five/six rounds qualifying sessions, depending on the overall duration of the event. The result is determined by the best half of the driver's performance. As the event bring in over 100 entrants, the fastest driver is guaranteed directly a place in front of the A-main final, the group that carries a chance of being the overall winner. The slower drivers are allocated a spot to compete in their groups to determine the overall positions.
