= 1955 Albi Grand Prix =

- Non-championship race in the 1955 Formula One season
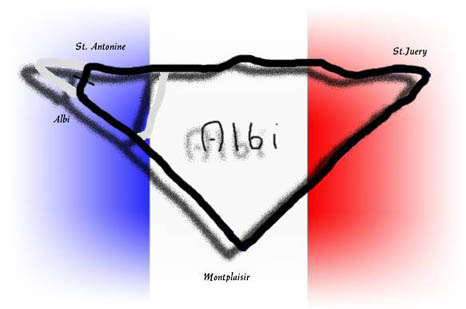

Race details
- Date: 29 May 1955
- Official name: XVII Grand Prix d'Albi
- Location: Circuit Les Planques, Albi
- Course: Street circuit
- Course length: 1.86 mi (2.99 km)
- Distance: 105 laps, 195.09 mi (313.97 km)

Pole position
Driver	(France) André Simon	Maserati
- Time: 1:18.1

Fastest lap
Driver	(France) André Simon	Maserati
- Time: 1:17.1

Podium
First	(France) André Simon	Maserati
Second	(France) Louis Rosier	Maserati
Third	(United Kingdom) Horace Gould	Maserati

The XVII Grand Prix d'Albi was a motor race, run to Formula One rules, held on 29 May 1955 at Circuit Les Planques, Albi. The race was run over 105 laps of the circuit, and was won by French driver André Simon in a Maserati 250F. Simon also set pole and fastest lap.

This was the last occasion of the Grand Prix d'Albi being run for Formula One cars, and the last race at Circuit des Planques, which was replaced by the Circuit d'Albi in 1962.

== Results ==
Pos	No.	Driver	Entrant	Constructor	Time/Position	Grid
1	2	(Italy) André Simon	Ecurie Rosier	Maserati 250F	2:23:22.1, 81.66 mph	1
2	4	(Italy) Louis Rosier	Ecurie Rosier	Maserati 250F	+1 lap	3
3	22	(United Kingdom) Horace Gould	Gould's Garage (Bristol)	Maserati 250F	+2 laps	7
4	10	(France) Jacques Pollet	Equipe Gordini	Gordini Type 16	+3 laps	6
5	20	(France) Pierre Levegh	Pierre Levegh	Ferrari 625	+4 laps	8
6	16	(Italy) Giorgio Scarlatti	Giorgio Scarlatti	Ferrari 500	+27 laps	11
Ret	12	(France) Élie Bayol	Equipe Gordini	Gordini Type 16	68 laps, rear axle	4
Ret	8	(France) Robert Manzon	Equipe Gordini	Gordini Type 16	50 laps, transmission	2
Ret	6	(United Kingdom) Lance Macklin	Stirling Moss Ltd.	Maserati 250F	36 laps, water hose	5
Ret	24	(United Kingdom) Ted Whiteaway	E.N. Whiteaway	HWM-Alta	17 laps, engine	10
Ret	18	(United Kingdom) Michael Young	M.F. Young	Connaught A-Type-Lea Francis	12 laps, crash	9

Previous race: 1955 Naples Grand Prix	Formula One non-championship races 1955 season	Next race: 1955 Curtis Trophy
Previous race: 1953 Albi Grand Prix	Albi Grand Prix	Next race: 1959 Albi Grand Prix
