= 1952 Albi Grand Prix =

Formula One race

- Non-championship race in the 1952 Formula One season
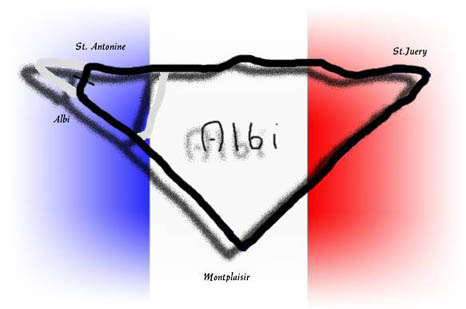

Race details
- Date: 1 June 1952
- Official name: XIV Grand Prix de l'Albigeois
- Location: Circuit Les Planques, Albi, France
- Course: Temporary Road Circuit
- Course length: 8.954 km (5.564 mi)
- Distance: 34 laps, 304.429 km (189.163 mi)

Pole position
Driver	(Argentina) Juan Manuel Fangio	BRM
- Time: 2:55.1

Fastest lap
Driver	(Argentina) José Froilán González	BRM
- Time: 3:06.0

Podium
First	(France) Louis Rosier	Ferrari
Second	(Brazil) Chico Landi	Ferrari
Third	(France) Yves Giraud-Cabantous	Talbot-Lago

The XIV Grand Prix de l'Albigeois was a Formula One motor race held on 1 June 1952 at Circuit Les Planques, Albi, France. The race was won by Louis Rosier in a Ferrari 375 Chico Landi was second in another 375 and Yves Giraud-Cabantous third in a Talbot-Lago T26C. BRM drivers Juan Manuel Fangio and José Froilán González took pole and fastest lap respectively, but both retired with mechanical problems.

== Classification ==
=== Race ===
Pos	No	Driver	Entrant	Car	Time/Retired	Grid
1	8	(France) Louis Rosier	Ecurie Rosier	Ferrari 375	1:50:39.0, 164.00 kph	3
2	6	(Brazil) Chico Landi	Escuderia Bandeirantes	Ferrari 375	+17.6s	17
3	22	(France) Yves Giraud-Cabantous	Ecurie Rosier	Talbot-Lago T26C	+1:12.6	5
4	12	(Argentina) Alberto Crespo	Automobiles Talbot	Talbot-Lago T26C	+3:14.2	13
5	26	(United Kingdom) Peter Whitehead	Graham Whitehead	Ferrari 125	+1 lap	11
6	28	(Switzerland) Rudi Fischer	Ecurie Espadon	Ferrari 500	+1 lap	8
7	24	(Italy) Gianfranco Comotti	Scuderia Guastalla	Ferrari 166	+4 laps	14
NC	16	(Thailand) B. Bira	Equipe Gordini	Simca Gordini Type 15	+6 laps, piston	7
NC	10	(France) Maurice Trintignant	Ecurie Rosier	Talbot-Lago T26C	+8 laps	4
Ret	14	(France) Jean Behra	Equipe Gordini	Gordini Type 16	23 laps, rear axle	9
Ret	2	(Argentina) Juan Manuel Fangio	British Racing Motors	BRM P15	15 laps, cylinder head stud	1
Ret	32	(United States) Harry Schell	Equipe Gordini	Simca Gordini Type 15	5 laps, transmission	10
Ret	20	(France) Georges Grignard	Automobiles Talbot	Talbot-Lago T26C	5 laps, crash	12
Ret	4	(Argentina) José Froilán González	British Racing Motors	BRM P15	5 laps, cylinder	2
Ret	36	(Belgium) André Pilette	Ecurie Belge	Talbot-Lago T26C	5 laps, crash	15
Ret	18	(France) Philippe Étancelin	Philippe Étancelin	Talbot-Lago T26C	0 laps, ignition	6
DNS	30	(United Kingdom) Steve Watson	Steve Watson	Maserati 4CLT/48	piston failure in practice	16
DNA	34	(Italy) Ettore Bianco		Maserati 4CLT/48		-

Previous race: 1952 Paris Grand Prix	Formula One non-championship races 1952 season	Next race: 1952 Grand Prix des Frontières
Previous race: 1951 Albi Grand Prix	Albi Grand Prix	Next race: 1953 Albi Grand Prix
