= 1951 Albi Grand Prix =

- Non-championship race in the 1951 Formula One season
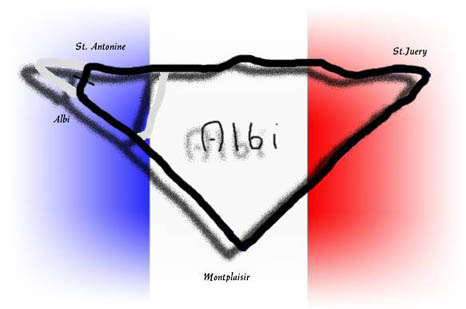

Race details
- Date: 5 August 1951
- Official name: XIII Grand Prix d'Albi
- Location: Circuit Les Planques, Albi
- Course: Temporary road circuit
- Course length: 8.954 km (5.564 mi)
- Distance: 34 laps, 304.429 km (189.163 mi)

Pole position
Driver	(France) Maurice Trintignant	Gordini
- Time: 3:08.8

Fastest lap
Driver	(France) Maurice Trintignant	Gordini
- Time: 3:11.6

Podium
First	(France) Maurice Trintignant	Gordini
Second	(France) Louis Rosier	Talbot-Lago
Third	(Monaco) Louis Chiron	Talbot-Lago

The XIII Grand Prix d'Albi was a motor race, run to Formula One rules, held on 5 August 1951 at the Circuit Les Planques, Albi. The race was run over 34 laps of the circuit, and was won by French driver Maurice Trintignant in a Simca-Gordini Type 15. Trintignant also set pole and fastest lap. Louis Rosier and Louis Chiron were second and third in their Talbot-Lago T26Cs.

== Results ==
Pos	No.	Driver	Entrant	Constructor	Time/Position	Grid
1	16	(France) Maurice Trintignant	Equipe Gordini	Simca-Gordini Type 15	1:51:23.1, 163.96kph	1
2	2	(France) Louis Rosier	Ecurie Rosier	Talbot-Lago T26C	+2:46.1	2
3	4	(Monaco) Louis Chiron	Ecurie Rosier	Talbot-Lago T26C	+1 lap	8
4	10	(France) André Simon	Equipe Gordini	Simca-Gordini Type 15	+2 laps	3
5	12	(Belgium) Johnny Claes	Ecurie Belge	Talbot-Lago T26C	+2 laps	5
6	22	(France) Jean Behra	Equipe Gordini	Simca-Gordini Type 15	+2 laps	10
7	14	(Belgium) Roger Laurent	Ecurie Belge	Talbot-Lago T26C	+3 laps	11
8	24	(United Kingdom) Lance Macklin	Hersham and Walton Motors	HWM=Alta	+3 laps	14
Ret	32	(Brazil) Francisco Landi	Scuderia Ferrari	Ferrari 375	15 laps, oil pipe	7
Ret	8	(France) Pierre Levegh	Pierre Levegh	Talbot-Lago T26C	5 laps, piston	9
Ret	10	(France) Pierre Meyrat	Yves Giraud-Cabantous	Talbot-Lago T26C	5 laps, brakes	12
Ret	18	(France) Robert Manzon	Equipe Gordini	Simca-Gordini Type 15	4 laps, suspension	6
Ret	6	(France) Philippe Étancelin	Philippe Étancelin	Talbot-Lago T26C	4 laps, magneto	4
Ret	28	(Italy) Gianfranco Comotti	Scuderia Marzotto	Ferrari 166 F2	3 laps, iginition/carburation	15

Previous race: 1951 Dutch Grand Prix	Formula One non-championship races 1951 season	Next race: 1951 Circuit of Pescara
Previous race: 1950 Albi Grand Prix	Albi Grand Prix	Next race: 1952 Albi Grand Prix
