= 1947 Albi Grand Prix =

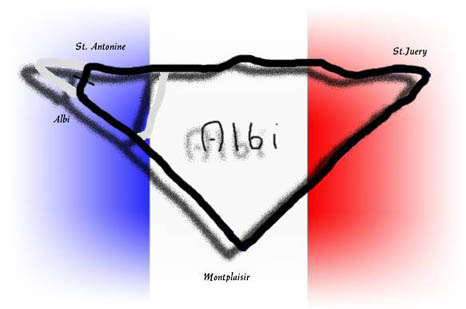
- Circuit des Planques

Race details
- Date: 13 July 1947
- Official name: IX Grand Prix de l'Albigeois
- Location: Albi, France
- Course: Circuit Les Planques
- Course length: 8.880 km (5.518 mi)
- Distance: 40 laps, 355.267 km (220.753 mi)

Pole position
Driver	(France) Henri Louveau	Maserati
- Time: 3:38.6

Fastest lap
Driver	(Italy) Luigi Villoresi	Maserati
- Time: 3:26.4

Podium
First	(France) Louis Rosier	Talbot T150SS
Second	(France) Raymond Sommer	Simca Gordini
Third	(France) Charles Pozzi	Delahaye

The 9th Grand Prix de l'Albigeois was a Formula One motor race held on 13 July 1947 at Les Planques circuit in Albi in the Tarn department of France. The winner of the 40 lap race was Louis Rosier in a Talbot-Lago T150SS. Second was Raymond Sommer in a Simca Gordini Type 11 and Charles Pozzi was third in a Delahaye 135. Maserati drivers Henri Louveau and Luigi Villoresi set pole and fastest lap respectively, but both retired.

== Results ==
Pos.	No.	Driver	Entrant	Car	Time	Grid
1	26	(France) Louis Rosier	Ecurie Tricolore	Talbot-Lago T150SS	2:29:48.7; 142.28kph	7
2	32	(France) Raymond Sommer	Equipe Gordini	Simca Gordini Type 11	+2:02.2	12
3	46	(France) Charles Pozzi	Charles Pozzi	Delahaye 135S	+1 lap	15
4	44	(France) Roger Loyer	Roger Loyer	Cisitalia D46-Fiat	+2 laps	14
5	40	(Italy) Eugenio Minetti	Scuderia Ambrosiana	Cisitalia D46-Fiat	+4 laps	17
6	34	(France) Maurice Trintignant	Equipe Gordini	Simca Gordini Type 11	+5 laps	5
7	28	(France) Charles de Cortanze (France) Pierre Veyron	Émile Darl'mat	Darl'mat-Peugeot	+5 laps	10
Ret	48	(France) Eugène Chaboud	Eugène Chaboud	Delahaye 135S	39 laps, accident	4
Ret	2	(France) Pierre Levegh	Ecurie Naphtra Course	Maserati 4CL	33 laps, valve	
Ret	20	(France) Jean Achard	Ecurie France-Course	Delahaye 155	21 laps, wheel	
Ret	8	(Italy) Luigi Villoresi	Scuderia Ambrosiana	Maserati 4CL	20 laps, out of fuel	
Ret	18	(United Kingdom) Leslie Brooke	Leslie Brooke	ERA B-Type	18 laps, engine	6
Ret	6	(United Kingdom) Ian Connell	I.F. Connell & K.D. Evans	Maserati 6CM	9 laps, spin	18
Ret	14	(France) Henri Louveau	Henri Louveau	Maserati 4CL	7 laps, engine	1
Ret	30	(France) Jean-Pierre Wimille	Equipe Gordini	Simca Gordini Type 15	7 laps, engine	2
Ret	36	(France) Igor Troubetzkoy	Equipe Gordini	Simca Gordini Type 11	5 laps, accident	16
Ret	16	(United Kingdom) Fred Ashmore	Reg Parnell	ERA A-Type	2 laps, overheating	
Ret	54	(United States) Harry Schell	Ecurie Laury Schell	Cisitalia D46-Fiat	1 lap, piston	13
Ret	4	(France) Raph	Ecurie Naphtra Course	Maserati 4CL	Engine	
Ret	22	(United Kingdom) Reg Parnell	Reg Parnell	Maserati 4CL	Piston	20
Ret	24	(France) Edmond Mouche	José Scaron	Talbot-Lago T150C	Engine	3
Ret	42	(Italy) Dorino Serafini	Dorino Serafini	Cisitalia D46-Fiat	Retired	11
Ret	52	(France) 'Robert'	'Robert'	Cisitalia D46-Fiat	Retired	9
Ret	60	(France) Marius Porta	Robert Manzon	Cisitalia D46-Fiat	Retired	19
Ret	62	(France) René Bonnet	Deutsch et Bonnet	DB-Citroen	Transmission	8
DNS	12	(France) Raymond Sommer	Raymond Sommer	Cisitalia D46-Fiat	Drove car no. 32	
DNA	10	(Italy) Alberto Ascari	Scuderia Ambrosiana	Maserati 4CL		
DNA	38	(France) Philippe Étancelin	Ecurie Gersac	Delage D6		
DNA	50	(Switzerland) Adolfo Mandirola	Adolfo Mandirola	Maserati 6CM		
DNA	56	(France) Raymond de Saugé	Raymond de Saugé	Cisitalia D46		
DNA	58	(Switzerland) Enrico Platé	Enrico Platé	Maserati 4CL		

Grand Prix Race
Previous race: 1947 Gransden Trophy Race	1947 Grand Prix season Grandes Épreuves	Next race: 1947 Bari Grand Prix
Previous race: 1946 Albi Grand Prix	Albi Grand Prix	Next race: 1948 Albi Grand Prix
