= 1948 Albi Grand Prix =

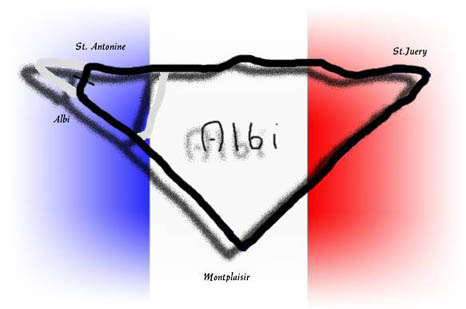
- Circuit des Planques

Race details
- Date: 29 August 1948
- Official name: X Grand Prix de l'Albigeois
- Location: Albi, France
- Course: Circuit Les Planques
- Course length: 8.880 km (5.518 mi)
- Distance: 34 laps, 301.94 km (187.62 mi)

Pole position
Driver	(Italy) Luigi Villoresi	Maserati
- Time: 3:14.2

Fastest lap
Driver	(Italy) Luigi Villoresi	Maserati
- Time: 3:10.1

Podium
First	(Italy) Luigi Villoresi	Maserati
Second	(France) Philippe Étancelin	Talbot-Lago
Third	(France) Louis Rosier	Talbot-Lago

The 10th Grand Prix de l'Albigeois was a Formula One motor race held on 29 August 1948 at Les Planques circuit in Albi in the Tarn department of France. The race was held over two heats of 17 laps, with the winner being decided by aggregate time.

The winner was Luigi Villoresi in a Maserati 4CLT/48; he also set fastest qualifying time, set fastest lap and won both heats by a comfortable margin. His aggregate time was over 1 minute and 40 seconds ahead of second placed Philippe Étancelin in a Talbot-Lago T26C. Louis Rosier was third in another T26C.

== Results ==
=== Qualifying ===
Pos.	No.	Driver	Entrant	Car	Time
1	10	(Italy) Luigi Villoresi	Scuderia Ambrosiana	Maserati 4CLT/48	3:14.2
2	24	(France) Philippe Étancelin	Philippe Étancelin	Talbot-Lago T26C	3:20.2
3	14	(United Kingdom) Leslie Brooke	Scuderia Ambrosiana	Maserati 4CLT/48	3:21.3
4	4	(France) Yves Giraud-Cabantous	Ecurie France	Talbot-Lago T26C	3:21.5
5	30	(France) "Raph"	Ecurie Mundia Course	Talbot-Lago T26C	3:21.8
6	2	(Monaco) Louis Chiron	Ecurie France	Talbot-Lago T26C	3:22.4
7	32	(Italy) Gianfranco Comotti	Gianfranco Comotti	Talbot-Lago T26C	3:24.1
8	8	(France) Louis Rosier	Ecurie Rosier	Talbot-Lago T26C	3:28.5
9	36	(Italy) Nello Pagani	Enrico Plate	Maserati 4CL	3:29.5
10	22	(Spain) Salvador Fabregas	Scuderia Auto Spagnola	Maserati 4CL	3:30.7
11	48	(France) Igor Troubetzkoy	Scuderia Inter	Ferrari 166	3:31.8
12	38	(France) Pierre Levegh	Pierre Levegh	Talbot-Lago T26C	3:32.0
13	50	(Italy) Ferdinando Righetti	Scuderia Inter	Ferrari 166	3:32.8
14	28	(United Kingdom) Bobbie Baird	Bobbie Baird	Emeryson-Duesenberg	3:36.3
15	26	(France) Henri Louveau	Ecurie Geneve	Maserati 4CM	3:36.3
16	42	(France) Charles Pozzi	Ecurie Lutetia	Talbot-Lago T26C	3:37.8
17	18	(Spain) Juan Jover	Scuderia Auto Spagnola	Maserati 4CL	3:39.4
18	40	(France) Eugene Chaboud	Ecurie Lutetia	Delahaye 135S	3:43.2
19	34	(Switzerland) Emmanuel de Graffenried	Enrico Plate	Maserati 4CL	3:44.2
20	46	(France) Pierre Meyrat	Pierre Meyrat	Delahaye 135S	3:44.6
21	12	(Thailand) B. Bira	Prince Chula	Maserati 4CL	3:45.3
22	20	(Spain) Paco Godia	Scuderia Auto Spagnola	Maserati 4CL	3:52.5
23	44	(Switzerland) Antonio Branca	Antonio Branca	Maserati 4CL	4:08.3

=== Aggregate result ===
Pos.	No.	Driver	Car	Time
1	8	(Italy) Luigi Villoresi	Maserati	1:52:57.9
2	24	(France) Philippe Étancelin	Maserati	+2:39.0
3	8	(France) Louis Rosier	Talbot-Lago	+1 lap
4	50	(Italy) Nando Righetti	Ferrari	+2 laps
5	40	(France) Eugène Chaboud	Delahaye	+3 laps
6	20	(France) Francesco Godia	Maserati	+4 laps
7	32	(Italy) Gianfranco Comotti	Talbot-Lago	+4 laps
8	46	(France) Pierre Meyrat	Delahaye	+4 laps
9	38	(France) Pierre Levegh	Talbot-Lago	+5 laps
10	2	(Monaco) Louis Chiron	Talbot-Lago	+7 laps
11	10	(United Kingdom) Leslie Brooke	Maserati	+8 laps
12	26	(France) Henri Louveau	Maserati	+8 laps
Ret.	30	(France) "Raph"	Talbot-Lago	24 laps, accident
Ret.	42	(France) Charles Pozzi	Talbot-Lago	19 laps
Ret.	48	(France) Igor Troubetzkoy	Ferrari	17 laps, accident
Ret.	34	(Switzerland) Emmanuel de Graffenried	Maserati	16 laps
Ret.	12	(Thailand) B. Bira	Maserati	11 laps, piston
Ret.	44	(Switzerland) Antonio Branca	Maserati	10 laps
Ret.	22	(Spain) Salvador Fabregas	Maserati	9 laps, suspension
Ret.	28	(United Kingdom) Bobbie Baird	Emeryson-Duesenberg	2 laps, magneto
Ret.	4	(France) Yves Giraud-Cabantous	Talbot-Lago	1 lap, gearbox
Ret.	18	(Spain) Juan Jover	Maserati	0 laps
Ret.	36	(Italy) Nello Pagani	Maserati	0 laps, oil pipe

Grand Prix Race
Previous race: 1948 Comminges Grand Prix	1948 Grand Prix season Grandes Épreuves	Next race: 1948 British Grand Prix
Previous race: 1947 Albi Grand Prix	Albi Grand Prix	Next race: 1949 Albi Grand Prix
