= Albi Grand Prix =

Motor race held in Albi

- Circuit Les Planques (1933–1955); Circuit d'Albi (1959–present)
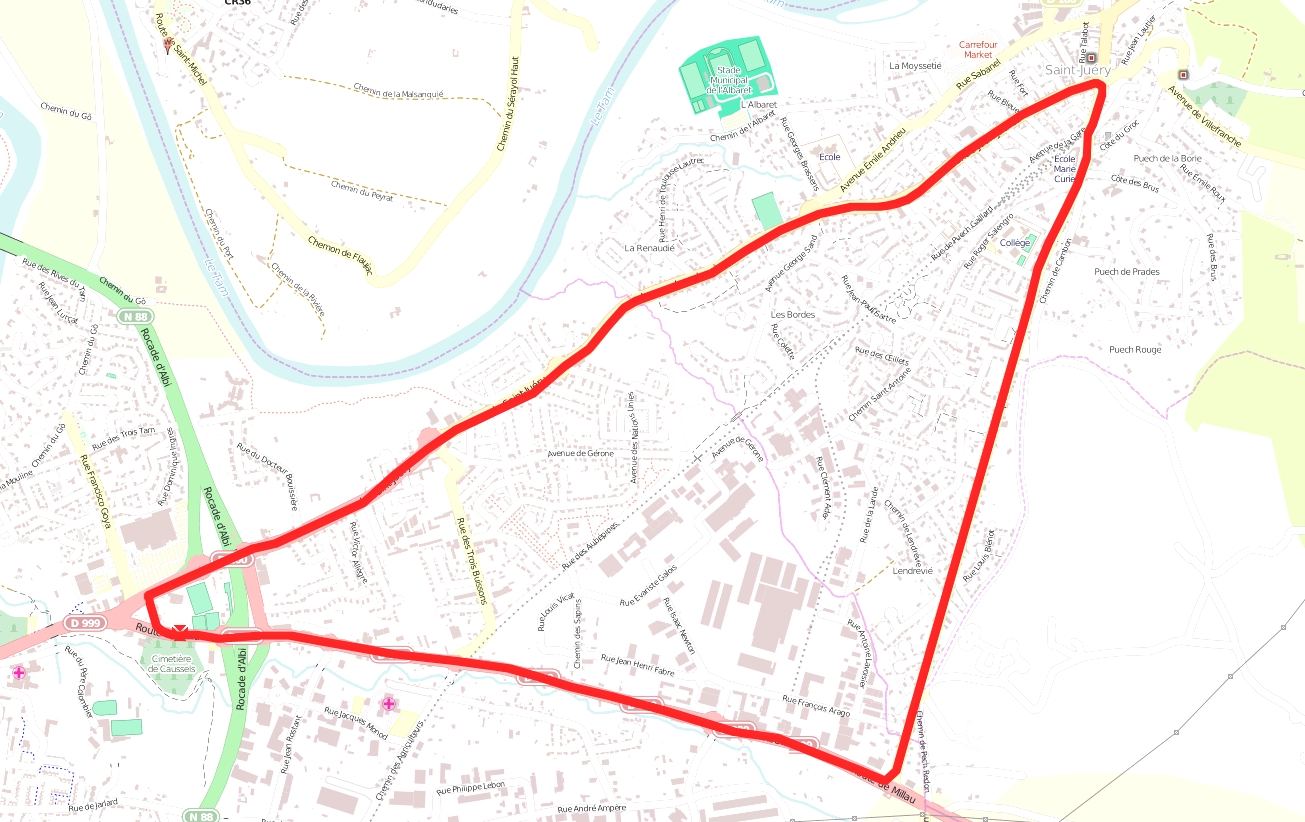

Race information
- First held: 1933
- Most wins (drivers): (France) Louis Rosier (4)
- Most wins (constructors): (Italy) Dallara

The Albi Grand Prix (French: Grand Prix de l'Albigeois) is a motor race held in Albi, in the Tarn department of Southern France. The first race took place in 1933 and was won by Louis Braillard in a Bugatti Type 51. After the Second World War, the Grand Prix was run to Formula One regulations for many years until, following the 1955 Le Mans disaster, racing at Circuit Les Planques came to an end.

In 1959 a new circuit was constructed around the perimeter of the nearby Le Sequestre aerodrome, west of Albi. Initially held as a Formula Junior event, the Grand Prix then took place for some years under Formula Two regulations, at a time when Formula One drivers such as Jim Clark, Jack Brabham and Graham Hill regularly took part in other formulae. It then ran under Formula Three and Formula Renault regulations for many years, but in recent times has been run as a historic or GT race.

== Circuits ==
=== Les Planques ===
The original 1933 circuit was a roughly triangular course 9.226 km (5.733 mi) in length running north-east from Les Planques on the east of Albi to Saint-Juéry, then south-west to meet the Route de Millau and then back to Les Planques. In 1934, the circuit length was slightly decreased to 8.911 km (5.537 mi). In 1954 the distance was considerably shortened to 2.991 km (1.859 mi), cutting out the run to Saint-Juéry.

== History of the Albi Grand Prix ==
=== Voiturette years (1933–1946) ===
The first Albi Grand Prix in 1933 was won by Louis Braillard in a Bugatti Type 51. The event was held up until the outbreak of the Second World War, other winners including B. Bira and Luigi Villoresi. Tazio Nuvolari won the first post-war race in 1946 with a Maserati 4CL.

Year	Winner	Car	Source
1933	(Switzerland) Louis Braillard	Bugatti Type 51	
1934	(United Kingdom) Rupert "Buddy" Featherstonhaugh	Maserati 26M	
1935	(France) Pierre Veyron	Bugatti Type 51	
1936	(Thailand) B. Bira	ERA B-Type	
1937	(United Kingdom) Humphrey Cook (United Kingdom) Raymond Mays	ERA C-Type	
1938	(Italy) Luigi Villoresi	Maserati 6CM	
1939	(United Kingdom) Johnny Wakefield	Maserati 4CL	
1940–1945	No race		
1946	(Italy) Tazio Nuvolari	Maserati 4CL	

=== Formula One years (1947–1955) ===
From 1947 to 1955 the race would mostly be held as a Formula One event. Louis Rosier won four times during this period, and future world Champion Juan Manuel Fangio won in 1949. The 1955 Le Mans disaster brought racing at Les Planques to a halt, the circuit deemed to be unsafe.

Year	Winner	Car	Source
1947	(France) Louis Rosier	Talbot T150SS	
1948	(Italy) Luigi Villoresi	Maserati 4CLT/48	
1949	(Argentina) Juan Manuel Fangio	Maserati 4CLT/48	
1950	(France) Louis Rosier	Talbot-Lago T26C	
1951	(France) Maurice Trintignant	Simca Gordini Type 15	
1952	(France) Louis Rosier	Ferrari 375	
1953	(France) Louis Rosier	Ferrari 375	
1954	(Argentina) Roberto Mieres	DB Monomill	
1955	(France) André Simon	Maserati 250F	

=== Formula Junior years (1959–1963) ===
Between 1959 and 1963, at the new Circuit d'Albi, the Grand Prix was run to Formula Junior regulations, with Lotus driver Peter Arundell winning twice.

Year	Winner	Car	Source
1959	(United Kingdom) Colin Davis	Taraschi-Fiat	
1960	(United Kingdom) Henry Taylor	Cooper T52-BMC	
1961	No race		
1962	(United Kingdom) Peter Arundell	Lotus 22-Cosworth	
1963	(United Kingdom) Peter Arundell	Lotus 27-Cosworth	

=== Formula Two years (1964–1973) ===
Between 1964 and 1973 the race was run to Formula Two regulations, apart from the 1970 event which was a Formula Three race. World Champion Jack Brabham won twice; Jim Clark, Graham Hill, Jackie Stewart and Emerson Fittipaldi were also winners.

Year	Winner	Car	Source
1964	(Australia) Jack Brabham	Brabham BT10-Cosworth	
1965	(United Kingdom) Jim Clark	Lotus 35-Cosworth	
1966	(Australia) Jack Brabham	Brabham BT21-Honda	
1967	(United Kingdom) Jackie Stewart	Matra MS7-Cosworth	
1968	(France) Henri Pescarolo	Matra MS7-Cosworth	
1969	(United Kingdom) Graham Hill	Lotus 59B-Cosworth	
1970	(France) Jean-Pierre Jarier	Tecno 70-Cosworth	
1971	(Brazil) Emerson Fittipaldi	Lotus 69-Cosworth	
1972	(France) Jean-Pierre Jaussaud	Brabham BT38-Cosworth	
1973	(Italy) Vittorio Brambilla	March 732-BMW	

=== Formula Renault years (1974–1978) ===
Between 1974 and 1978 the Grand Prix was run to Formula Renault regulations. Future World Champion Alain Prost was among the winners, as were René Arnoux and Didier Pironi.

=== Formula Three years (1979–2002) ===
Between 1979 and 2002 the Grand Prix was run to Formula Three regulations. Future Formula One drivers such as Philippe Alliot, Jean Alesi and Olivier Panis were among the winners.

=== Later years (2002–present) ===
From 2002 the Albi Grand Prix has variously been run for Formula Renault 2.0, GT racing and historic racing events.
