= Gordini T17S =

Sports car prototype

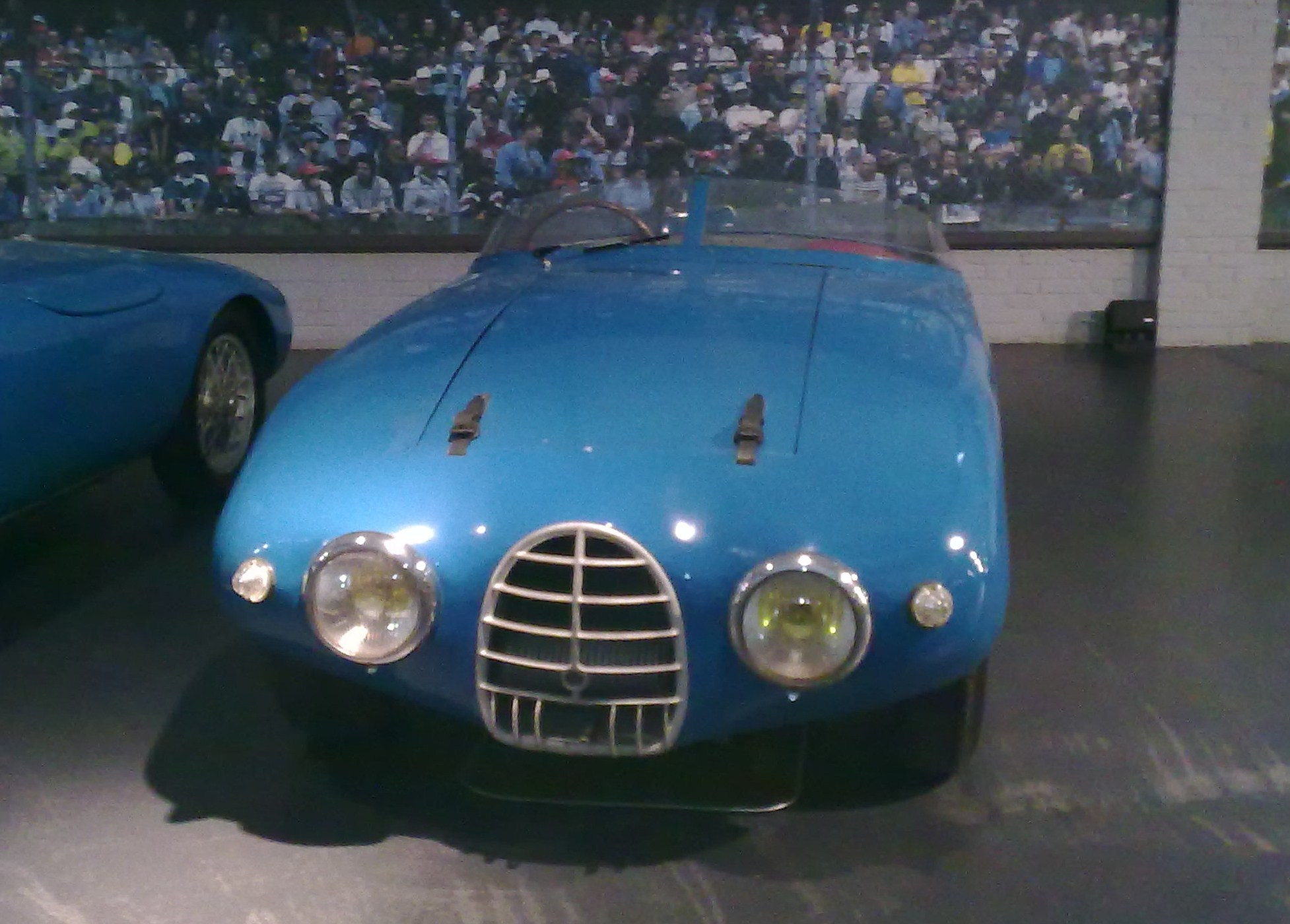
- Category: Sports car
- Constructor: Gordini

Technical specifications
- Chassis: Steel tubular spaceframe
- Suspension (front): Independent with torsion bar, hydraulic Messier dampers, anti-roll bar
- Suspension (rear): Rear rigid live axle, Watts linkage, Messier hydraulic dampers, anti-roll bar
- Engine: 1.1–1.5 L (67.1–91.5 cu in) I4 naturally-aspirated mid-engined
- Transmission: 4/5-speed manual
- Power: ~ 135 hp (101 kW)
- Weight: 700 kg (1,543 lb)
- Brakes: Disc brakes

Competition history

The Gordini Type 17S was a sports car prototype, designed, developed, and built by French manufacturer Gordini, in 1953.

== Development history and technology ==
The Type 17S remained a one-off. It was Amédée Gordini's attempt to enter the small-capacity racing classes. At that time, however, the classes from 0.6 to 1.1 litres were already occupied by Panhard, Monopole, and Deutsch Bonnet, who had a great deal of experience with these small racing vehicles. The car had a Spyder body and a 1.1-litre straight-four engine. Today the vehicle is part of the Schlumpf Collection.

== Racing history ==
The car was driven at the 24-hour race of Le Mans in 1954 by Belgians André Pilette and Gilberte Thirion, who had to give up after ignition damage in the eleventh hour of the race. Another outing at Le Mans in 1956 by Charles de Clareur and André Milhoux also ended in failure.
