= Jean-Louis Rosier =

French racing driver

- Nationality: (France) French
- Born: Louis Jean Rosier Jr. 14 June 1925 Clermont-Ferrand, France
- Died: 1 July 2011 (aged 86) Clermont-Ferrand, France
- Relatives: Louis Rosier (father)

24 Hours of Le Mans career
- Years: 1949–1955
- Teams: Ecurie Rosier; Renault
- Best finish: 1st (1950)
- Class wins: 1 (1950)

Louis Jean Rosier Jr., professionally known as Jean-Louis Rosier (14 June 1925 – 1 July 2011) was the son of Louis Rosier. Together they won the 24 Hours of Le Mans in 1950, of which all except for 2 laps were driven by Louis Rosier. The Charade Circuit near Clermont-Ferrand is also named after them.

== Complete 24 Hours of Le Mans results ==
Year	Team	Co-Drivers	Car	Class	Laps	Pos.	Class Pos.
1949	(France) Ecurie Rosier	(France) Louis Rosier	Talbot-Lago Spéciale	S5.0	21	DNF (Fanbelt)	
1950	(France) Louis Rosier (private entrant)	(France) Louis Rosier	Talbot-Lago T26 GS Biplace	S5.0	256	1st	1st
1951	(France) Régie Renault	(France) Jean Estager	Renault 4CV-1063	S750	194	DNF (Accident)	
1952	(France) Ecurie Rosier	(France) Jean Estager	Ferrari 340 America	S5.0		DNS	
1953	(France) R.N.U. Renault	(France) Robert Schollmann	Renault 4CV-1068 Spyder	S750	218	23rd	4th
1954	(France) Ecurie Rosier	(France) Pierre Meyrat	Talbot-Lago T26 GS Spyder	S5.0	62	DNF (Accident)	
1955	(France) Ecurie Rosier	(France) Jean Estager	Renault 4CV-1068 Spyder	S750		DNS	

Sporting positions
Preceded by Luigi Chinetti; Peter Mitchell-Thomson	Winner of the 24 Hours of Le Mans; 1950 with: Louis Rosier	Succeeded by Peter Walker; Peter Whitehead
