= 1953 Albi Grand Prix =

- Non-championship race in the 1953 Formula One season
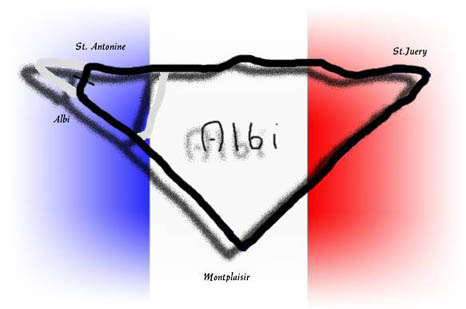

Race details
- Date: 31 May 1953
- Official name: XV Grand Prix de l'Albigeois
- Location: Circuit Les Planques, Albi, France
- Course: Temporary Road Circuit
- Course length: 8.954 km (5.564 mi)
- Distance: 18 laps, 161.162 km (100.141 mi)

Fastest lap
Driver	(United Kingdom) Ken Wharton	BRM
- Time: 2:52.0

Podium
First	(France) Louis Rosier	Ferrari
Second	(Argentina) José Froilán González	BRM
Third	(France) Maurice Trintignant	Gordini

The XV Grand Prix de l'Albigeois was a combined Formula One and Formula Two motor race held on 31 May 1953 at Circuit Les Planques, Albi, France. The race was held over two heats of 10 laps; one for Formula One and one for Formula Two, and a final of 18 laps in which both classes took part. The top four finishers in each heat qualified for the final, plus another four based on finishing position.

Élie Bayol in an O.S.C.A. Tipo 20 qualified in pole position for the Formula Two heat but finished second behind Louis Rosier's Ferrari 500. Peter Whitehead was third in a Cooper T24-Alta. Roberto Mieres set fastest lap in his Gordini Type 16.

In the Formula One heat, Juan Manuel Fangio qualified on pole, set fastest lap and won in a BRM Type 15. José Froilán González was second in another Type 15 and Louis Rosier was third in a Ferrari 375.

Rosier won the final in the Ferrari 375. González was second and Maurice Trintignant third in a Gordini Type 16. Ken Wharton set fastest lap in another BRM Type 16.

== Classification ==
=== Heat One - Formula Two cars ===
Pos	No	Driver	Entrant	Car	Time/Retired	Grid
1	2	(France) Louis Rosier	Ecurie Rosier	Ferrari 500	33:41.4, 158.19 kph	3
2	8	(France) Élie Bayol	Élie Bayol	O.S.C.A. Tipo 20	+24.5s	1
3	10	(United Kingdom) Peter Whitehead	Graham Whitehead	Cooper T24-Alta	+52.7s	5
4	6	(Argentina) Roberto Mieres	Equipe Gordini	Gordini Type 16	+54.0s	4
5	12	(United States) Tom Cole	Atlantic Stable	Cooper T23-Bristol	+1:31.2	6
6	16	(Belgium) Charles de Tornaco	Ecurie Francorchamps	Ferrari 500	+2:26.3	8
7	14	(Belgium) Johnny Claes	Ecurie Belge	Connaught Type A-Lea Francis	+3:00.4	7
8	18	(United Kingdom) John Lyons	Connaught Engineering	Connaught Type A-Lea Francis	+3:12.1	9
Ret.	4	(United States) Harry Schell	Equipe Gordini	Gordini Type 16	8 laps, spark plugs	2
DNA	20	(United Kingdom) Rodney Nuckey	Rodney Nuckey	Cooper T23-Bristol		

=== Heat Two - Formula One cars ===
Pos	No	Driver	Entrant	Car	Time/Retired	Grid
1	7	(Argentina) Juan Manuel Fangio	BRM Ltd.	BRM Type 15	29:57.8, 178.15 kph	1
2	9	(United Kingdom) Ken Wharton	BRM Ltd.	BRM Type 15	+1:11.5	4
3	5	(France) Louis Rosier	Ecurie Rosier	Ferrari 375	+2:06.6	10
4	15	(France) Maurice Trintignant	Equipe Gordini	Gordini Type 16	+2:10.5	6
5	11	(Argentina) José Froilán González	BRM Ltd.	BRM Type 15	+2:52.5	3
6	17	(France) Yves Giraud-Cabantous	Ecurie Rosier	Talbot-Lago T26C	+1 lap	7
7	21	(Italy) Giovanni de Riu	Giovanni de Riu	Maserati 4CLT/48	+1 lap	9
Ret.	19	(United Kingdom) Duncan Hamilton	Duncan Hamilton	Talbot-Lago T26C	8 laps, gearbox	8
Ret.	3	(Italy) Giuseppe Farina	G.A. Vandervell	Ferrari 375	5 laps, engine	5
Ret.	1	(Italy) Alberto Ascari	Ferrari	Ferrari 375	3 laps, gearbox	2

=== Final ===
Formula One competitors highlighted in blue.

Pos	No	Driver	Entrant	Car	Time/Retired	Grid
1	5	(France) Louis Rosier	Ecurie Rosier	Ferrari 375	56:36.8, 169.72 kph	3
2	11	(Argentina) José Froilán González	BRM Ltd.	BRM Type 15	+31.0s	2
3	15	(France) Maurice Trintignant	Equipe Gordini	Gordini Type 16	+1:53.8	4
4	6	(Argentina) Roberto Mieres	Equipe Gordini	Gordini Type 16	+1 lap	7
5	10	(United Kingdom) Peter Whitehead	Graham Whitehead	Cooper T24-Alta	+1 lap	6
6	14	(Belgium) Johnny Claes	Ecurie Belge	Connaught Type A-Lea Francis	+1 lap	11
7	12	(United States) Tom Cole	Atlantic Stable	Cooper T23-Bristol	+1 lap	8
Ret.	16	(Belgium) Charles de Tornaco	Ecurie Francorchamps	Ferrari 500	11 laps, engine	10
Ret.	9	(United Kingdom) Ken Wharton	British Racing Motors	BRM Type 15	11 laps, accident	2
Ret.	7	(Argentina) Juan Manuel Fangio	British Racing Motors	BRM Type 15	9 laps, tyres/brakes	1
Ret.	17	(France) Yves Giraud-Cabantous^{1}	Ecurie Rosier	Talbot-Lago T26C	9 laps, mechanical	12
Ret.	8	(France) Élie Bayol	Élie Bayol	O.S.C.A. Tipo 20	2 laps, clutch	5

^{1}Lyons should have been in the final but had packed his car away, believing he had been eliminated. Giraud-Cabantous took his place.

Previous race: 1953 Eifelrennen	Formula One non-championship races 1953 season	Next race: 1953 Coupe de Printemps
Previous race: 1952 Albi Grand Prix	Albi Grand Prix	Next race: 1954 Albi Grand Prix
