= Circuit d'Albi =

Motorsport race track in Ali, France

- Full Circuit (2009–present)
- Location: Albi, Tarn, Occitanie, France
- Coordinates: 43°54′55.19″N 2°6′48.74″E
- Opened: 1959
- Major events: Former: FFSA GT (1997, 2002, 2004–2011, 2020–2022); TC France Series (2021–2022); Formula Two; Albi Grand Prix (1959–1960, 1962–1969, 1971–1973); Racecar Euro Series (2009); French F4 Championship (2011); Porsche Carrera Cup France (1988–1998, 2002–2011); French Formula Renault (1971–1972, 1975–1993, 1996–2007); French Supertouring Championship (1976–1979, 1981–1997, 1999–2005); French F3 (1964–1971, 1973, 1979, 1981–2002)
- Website: https://circuit-albi.fr

Full Circuit (2009–present)
- Length: 3.565 km (2.215 mi)
- Turns: 15
- Race lap record: 1:18.034 ( (France) Dominique Cauvin, ASP Racing, 2015, CN)

Full Circuit (2003–2008)
- Length: 3.573 km (2.220 mi)
- Turns: 14
- Race lap record: 1:15.809 ( (France) Romain Grosjean, Tatuus FR2000, 2005, FR 2.0)

Full Circuit (1994–2002)
- Length: 3.551 km (2.206 mi)
- Turns: 11
- Race lap record: 1:09.087 ( (Portugal) Tiago Monteiro, Dallara F399, 2000, F3)

Full Circuit (1988–1993)
- Length: 3.536 km (2.197 mi)
- Turns: 11
- Race lap record: 1:09.930 ( (France) Christophe Tinseau, Dallara F393, 1993, F3)

Full Circuit (1981–1987)
- Length: 3.546 km (2.203 mi)
- Turns: 7
- Race lap record: 1:09.850 ( (Norway) Harald Huysman, Ralt RT30, 1986, F3)

Full Circuit (1962–1980)
- Length: 3.636 km (2.259 mi)
- Turns: 7
- Race lap record: 1:08.900 ( (France) Jean-Pierre Beltoise, March 732, 1973, F2)

The Circuit d'Albi is a 3.565 km (2.215 mi) motorsport race track located in the French town of Le Sequestre near Albi, about 80 km (50 mi) northeast of Toulouse. Built to replace the nearby Circuit Les Planques public road circuit, Albi has 70 years of history in motor-racing, including the 1951 French motorcycle Grand Prix. It hosted the FFSA GT Championship in 1997, 2002, 2004–2011, and 2020–2022.

Notably, it shares its grounds with an active airport in its infield, the Aérodrome d'Albi - Le Sequestre (fr).

== Lap records ==
As of June 2022, the fastest official race lap records at the Circuit d'Albi are listed as:

| Category | Time | Driver | Vehicle | Event |
Full Circuit (2009–present): 3.565 km (2.215 mi)
| CN | 1:18.034 | Dominique Cauvin | ASP Racing | 2015 Albi Trophée Endurance Proto round |
| Porsche Carrera Cup | 1:21.805 | Kévin Estre | Porsche 911 (997 II) GT3 Cup 3.8 | 2011 Albi Porsche Carrera Cup France round |
| GT4 | 1:23.525 | Jim Pla | Mercedes-AMG GT4 | 2022 Albi French GT4 round |
| Formula Renault 1.6 | 1:26.710 | Matthieu Vaxivière | Signatech FR 1.6 | 2011 Albi French F4 round |
| Renault Clio Cup | 1:34.848 | Thibaut Bossy | Renault Clio R.S. V | 2020 Albi Renault Clio Cup Spain round |
Full Circuit (2003–2008): 3.573 km (2.220 mi)
| Formula Renault 2.0 | 1:15.809 | Romain Grosjean | Tatuus FR2000 | 2005 Albi French Formula Renault round |
| Porsche Carrera Cup | 1:17.799 | Mike Parisy | Porsche 911 (997 I) GT3 Cup | 2007 Albi Porsche Carrera Cup France round |
| Silhouette racing car | 1:21.165 | Julien Melis | Opel Astra Coupé | 2003 Albi French Supertouring round |
Full Circuit (1994–2002): 3.551 km (2.206 mi)
| Formula Three | 1:09.087 | Tiago Monteiro | Dallara F399 | 2000 Albi French F3 round |
| Formula Renault 2.0 | 1:14.215 | Éric Salignon | Tatuus FR2000 | 2002 Albi French Formula Renault round |
| GT2 | 1:16.709 | Jean-Pierre Jarier | Porsche 911 GT2 | 1997 Albi FFSA GT round |
| Silhouette racing car | 1:18.687 | Vincent Radermecker | SEAT Toledo Silhouette | 2002 Albi French Supertouring round |
| Super Touring | 1:19.668 | William David | Peugeot 406 | 2000 Albi French Supertouring round |
Full Circuit (1988–1993): 3.536 km (2.197 mi)
| Formula Three | 1:09.930 | Christophe Tinseau | Dallara F393 | 1993 Albi French F3 round |
| Formula Renault 2.0 | 1:17.910 | Emmanuel Collard | Martini MK59 | 1990 Albi French Formula Renault round |
Full Circuit (1981–1987): 3.546 km (2.203 mi)
| Formula Three | 1:09.850 | Harald Huysman | Ralt RT30 | 1986 1st Albi French F3 round |
| Group 6 | 1:11.780 | José Thibault | Dona-BMW | 1984 Albi French Group 6 race |
| Formula Renault 2.0 | 1:13.370 | Bernard Soulié | Martini MK36 | 1982 Albi French Formula Renault round |
| Group A | 1:18.860 | Denis Morin | BMW 635 CSi | 1987 Albi French Supertouring Group A round |
Full Circuit (1962–1980): 3.565 km (2.215 mi)
| Formula Two | 1:08.900 | Jean-Pierre Beltoise | March 732 | 1973 Albi Grand Prix |
| Formula Three | 1:12.980 | Alain Prost | Martini MK27 | 1979 Albi French F3 round |
| Formula Renault 2.0 | 1:17.560 | Alain Ferté | Martini MK36 | 1979 2nd Albi French Formula Renault round |
| Formula Junior | 1:21.400 | Peter Arundell | Lotus 27 | 1963 Albi Grand Prix |
| Group 4 | 1:23.100 | Guy Ligier | Ford GT40 | 1965 Albi Grand Prix |
| Group 6 | 1:30.400 | Daniel Rouveyran | Lola T210 | 1971 Albi Gr.5/6 National race |
| Group 3 | 1:30.800 | Henri Oreiller | Ferrari 250 GT SWB | 1962 Albi Grand Prix |

== See also ==
- Circuit Les Planques, the street circuit in Albi which held the Albi Grand Prix before
