= André Milhoux =

Belgian racing driver (born 1928)

- Born: 9 December 1928 (age 97); Bressoux, Liège, Belgium

Formula One World Championship career
- Nationality: (Belgium) Belgian
- Active years: 1956
- Team: Gordini
- Entries: 1
- Championships: 0
- Wins: 0
- Podiums: 0
- Career points: 0
- Pole positions: 0
- Fastest laps: 0
- First entry: 1956 German Grand Prix

André Milhoux (French pronunciation: [ɑ̃.dʁe mi.lu]; born 9 December 1928) is a former racing driver from Belgium. He participated in one Formula One World Championship Grand Prix, the 1956 German Grand Prix on 5 August 1956, but had to retire after 15 laps due to an engine failure. He scored no championship points.

== Complete Formula One World Championship results ==
(key)

Year	Entrant	Chassis	Engine	1	2	3	4	5	6	7	8	WDC	Points
1956	Equipe Gordini	Gordini Type 32	Gordini Straight-8	ARG	MON	500	BEL	FRA	GBR	GER; Ret	ITA	NC	0
