= Chapdes-Beaufort =

- Commune
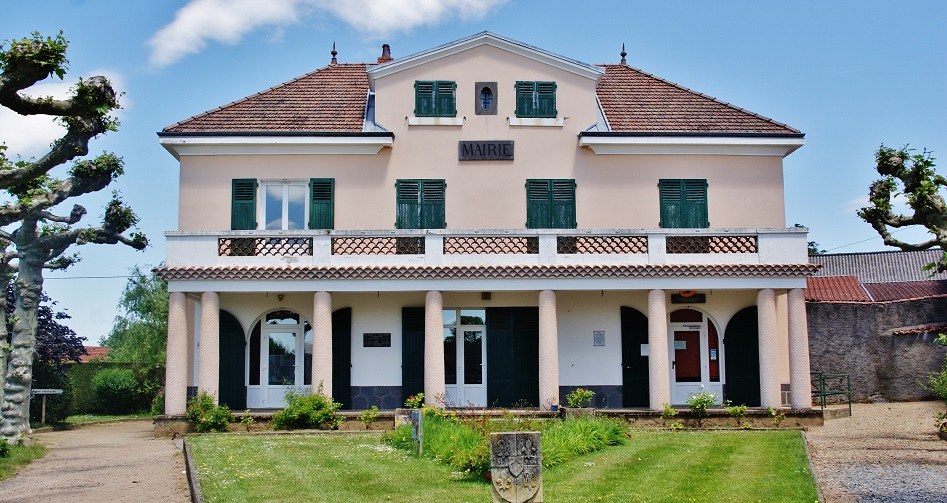
- The town hall in Chapdes-Beaufort

- Coat of arms
- Location of Chapdes-Beaufort
- Location within France Location within Auvergne-Rhône-Alpes
- Coordinates: 45°53′35″N 2°51′50″E
- Country: France
- Region: Auvergne-Rhône-Alpes
- Department: Puy-de-Dôme
- Arrondissement: Riom
- Canton: Saint-Ours
- Intercommunality: Chavanon Combrailles et Volcans

Government
  - Mayor (2026–32): Luc Cailloux
- Area^{1}: 31.79 km^{2} (12.27 sq mi)
- Highest elevation: 923 m (3,028 ft)
- Lowest elevation: 510 m (1,670 ft)
- Population (2023): 1,140
  - Density: 35.9/km^{2} (92.9/sq mi)
- Time zone: UTC+01:00 (CET)
  - Summer (DST): UTC+02:00 (CEST)
- INSEE/Postal code: 63085 /63230
- ^{1} French Land Register data, which excludes lakes, ponds, glaciers > 1 km^{2} (0.386 sq mi or 247 acres) and river estuaries.

Chapdes-Beaufort (French pronunciation: [ʃa(p)d bofɔʁ]) is a commune in the Puy-de-Dôme department in Auvergne-Rhône-Alpes in central France. It is part of the canton of Saint-Ours and the communauté de communes Chavanon Combrailles et Volcans.

== See also ==
- Communes of the Puy-de-Dôme department
