= 1956 German Grand Prix =

← Previous race	Next race →
- Nürburgring layout

Race details
- Date: 5 August 1956
- Official name: XVIII Großer Preis von Deutschland
- Location: Nürburgring, Nürburg, West Germany
- Course: Permanent road course
- Course length: 22.810 km (14.173 miles)
- Distance: 22 laps, 501.820 km (311.806 miles)

Pole position
Driver	(Argentina) Juan Manuel Fangio	Ferrari
- Time: 9:51.2

Fastest lap
Driver	(Argentina) Juan Manuel Fangio	Ferrari
- Time: 9:41.6

Podium
First	(Argentina) Juan Manuel Fangio	Ferrari
Second	(United Kingdom) Stirling Moss	Maserati
Third	(France) Jean Behra	Maserati

The 1956 German Grand Prix was a Formula One motor race held on 5 August 1956 at Nürburgring. It was race 7 of 8 in the 1956 World Championship of Drivers.

== Winner ==
Forty-five-year-old Argentine Juan Manuel Fangio won the race for Ferrari, and broke Hermann Lang's 17-year-old lap record, set in a Mercedes.

== Attendees ==
Present at the event was 18-year old Juan Carlos, later King of Spain, in support of his relative Alfonso de Portago.

== Classification ==
=== Qualifying ===
Pos	No	Driver	Constructor	Time	Gap
1	1	(Argentina) Juan Manuel Fangio	Ferrari	9:51.2	—
2	5	(United Kingdom) Peter Collins	Ferrari	9:51.5	+0.3
3	4	(Italy) Eugenio Castellotti	Ferrari	9:54.4	+3.2
4	7	(United Kingdom) Stirling Moss	Maserati	10:03.4	+12.2
5	4	(Italy) Luigi Musso	Ferrari	10:20.3	+29.1
6	8	(Italy) Cesare Perdisa	Maserati	10:21.0	+29.8
7	8	(Italy) Umberto Maglioli	Maserati	10:26.7	+35.5
8	6	(France) Jean Behra	Maserati	10:31.6	+40.4
9	16	(United Kingdom) Roy Salvadori	Maserati	10:32.4	+41.2
10	5	(Spain) Alfonso de Portago	Ferrari	10:37.1	+45.9
11	21	(United Kingdom) Bruce Halford	Maserati	11:04.1	+1:12.9
12	12	(United States) Harry Schell	Maserati	11:16.5	+1:25.3
13	19	(United Kingdom) Horace Gould	Maserati	11:32.2	+1:41.0
14	15	(France) Louis Rosier	Maserati	11:39.0	+1:47.8
15	10	(France) Robert Manzon	Gordini	11:55.8	+2:04.6
16	20	(Spain) Paco Godia	Maserati	11:57.6	+2:06.4
17	14	(Italy) Giorgio Scarlatti	Ferrari	13:05.2	+3:14.0
18	11	(Belgium) André Pilette	Gordini	13:31.0	+3:39.8
19	18	(Italy) Luigi Piotti	Maserati	13:50.1	+3:58.9
20	22	(Switzerland) Ottorino Volonterio	Maserati	14:17.1	+4:25.9
21	17	(Italy) Luigi Villoresi	Maserati		
22	11	(Belgium) André Milhoux	Gordini		

=== Race ===
Pos	No	Driver	Constructor	Laps	Time/Retired	Grid	Points
1	1	(Argentina) Juan Manuel Fangio	Ferrari	22	3:38:43.7	1	9^{1}
2	7	(United Kingdom) Stirling Moss	Maserati	22	+46.4	4	6
3	6	(France) Jean Behra	Maserati	22	+7:38.3	8	4
4	20	(Spain) Paco Godia	Maserati	20	+2 Laps	16	3
5	15	(France) Louis Rosier	Maserati	19	+3 Laps	14	2
DSQ	21	(United Kingdom) Bruce Halford	Maserati	20	Push start	11	
NC	22	(Switzerland) Ottorino Volonterio	Maserati	16	+6 Laps	19	
Ret	11	(Belgium) André Milhoux	Gordini	15	Engine	21	
Ret	5	(Spain) Alfonso de Portago (United Kingdom) Peter Collins	Ferrari	14	Accident	10	
Ret	17	(Italy) Luigi Villoresi	Maserati	13	Engine	20	
Ret	12	(United States) Harry Schell	Maserati	13	Overheating	12	
Ret	4	(Italy) Luigi Musso (Italy) Eugenio Castellotti	Ferrari	11	Accident	5	
Ret	2	(United Kingdom) Peter Collins	Ferrari	8	Fuel Leak	2	
Ret	3	(Italy) Eugenio Castellotti	Ferrari	5	Electrical	3	
Ret	8	(Italy) Umberto Maglioli	Maserati	3	Steering	7	
Ret	19	(United Kingdom) Horace Gould	Maserati	3	Oil Pressure	13	
Ret	16	(United Kingdom) Roy Salvadori	Maserati	2	Suspension	9	
Ret	10	(France) Robert Manzon	Gordini	0	Suspension	15	
Ret	14	(Italy) Giorgio Scarlatti	Ferrari	0	Engine	17	
DNS	8	(Italy) Cesare Perdisa	Maserati		Practice Accident	6	
DNS	11	(Belgium) André Pilette	Gordini		Practice Accident	18	
DNS	18	(Italy) Luigi Piotti	Maserati		Villoresi Drove Car		

Notes

- ^1 – Includes 1 point for fastest lap

== Shared drives ==
- Car #5: Alfonso de Portago (10 laps) and Peter Collins (4 laps).
- Car #4: Luigi Musso (8 laps) and Eugenio Castellotti (3 laps).

== Championship standings after the race ==
Drivers' Championship standings

	Pos	Driver	Points
1	1	(Argentina) Juan Manuel Fangio	30
1	2	(United Kingdom) Peter Collins	22
	3	(France) Jean Behra	22
	4	(United Kingdom) Stirling Moss	19
	5	(United States) Pat Flaherty	8

- Note: Only the top five positions are included.

Previous race: 1956 British Grand Prix	FIA Formula One World Championship; 1956 season	Next race: 1956 Italian Grand Prix
Previous race: 1954 German Grand Prix	German Grand Prix	Next race: 1957 German Grand Prix
