= French motorcycle Grand Prix =

Motorcycle race held in France

French Grand Prix

Grand Prix motorcycle racing
- Venue: Bugatti Circuit (1969–1970, 1976, 1979, 1983, 1985, 1987, 1989–1990, 1994–1995, 2000–present); Circuit Paul Ricard (1973, 1975, 1977, 1980–1981, 1984, 1986, 1988, 1991, 1996–1999); Circuit de Nevers Magny-Cours (1992); Circuit Paul Armagnac (1978, 1982); Circuit de Charade (1959–1964, 1966–1967, 1972, 1974); Rouen-Les-Essarts (1953, 1965); Reims-Gueux (1954–1955); Circuit Les Planques (1951)
- First race: 1951
- Most wins (rider): Giacomo Agostini (7)
- Most wins (manufacturer): Honda (53)

The French motorcycle Grand Prix is a motorcycling event that is part of the FIM Grand Prix motorcycle racing season.

The Grand Prix was held on different circuits in its history: on the Circuit de Charade (Puy-de-Dôme) between 1959 and 1967, Le Mans circuit on numerous occasions since 1969, alternating with the Circuit Paul Ricard at Le Castellet, used it for the first time in 1973, the Circuit Paul Armagnac in Nogaro in 1978 and 1982 and the Circuit de Nevers Magny-Cours once in 1992. Since 2000 the race has been held at Le Mans on the Bugatti Circuit.

The event is due to take place at the Bugatti Circuit until at least 2031.

== Official names and sponsors ==
- 1959–1960: Grand Prix de France de Vitesse (no official sponsor)
- 1962–1964, 1966–1967, 1972, 1974, 1978, 1983, 1985–1992, 1995–1996, 2009: Grand Prix de France (no official sponsor)
- 1970: Grand Prix de France Motocyclistes (no official sponsor)
- 1975–1977, 1980–1982, 1984, 1994, 1997–1999: Grand Prix de France Moto (no official sponsor)
- 2000–2001, 2003–2004: Grand Prix Polini de France (listed without a sponsor on the cover until 2001)
- 2002: Polini Grand Prix de France (listed without a sponsor on the cover)
- 2005: Grand Prix Alice de France
- 2006–2008: Alice Grand Prix de France
- 2010–2016: Monster Energy Grand Prix de France
- 2017–2018: HJC Helmets Grand Prix de France
- 2019–2020: Shark Helmets Grand Prix de France
- 2021–2023: Shark Grand Prix de France
- 2024: Michelin Grand Prix de France
- 2025–2026: Michelin Grand Prix of France

== Formerly used circuits and layouts ==
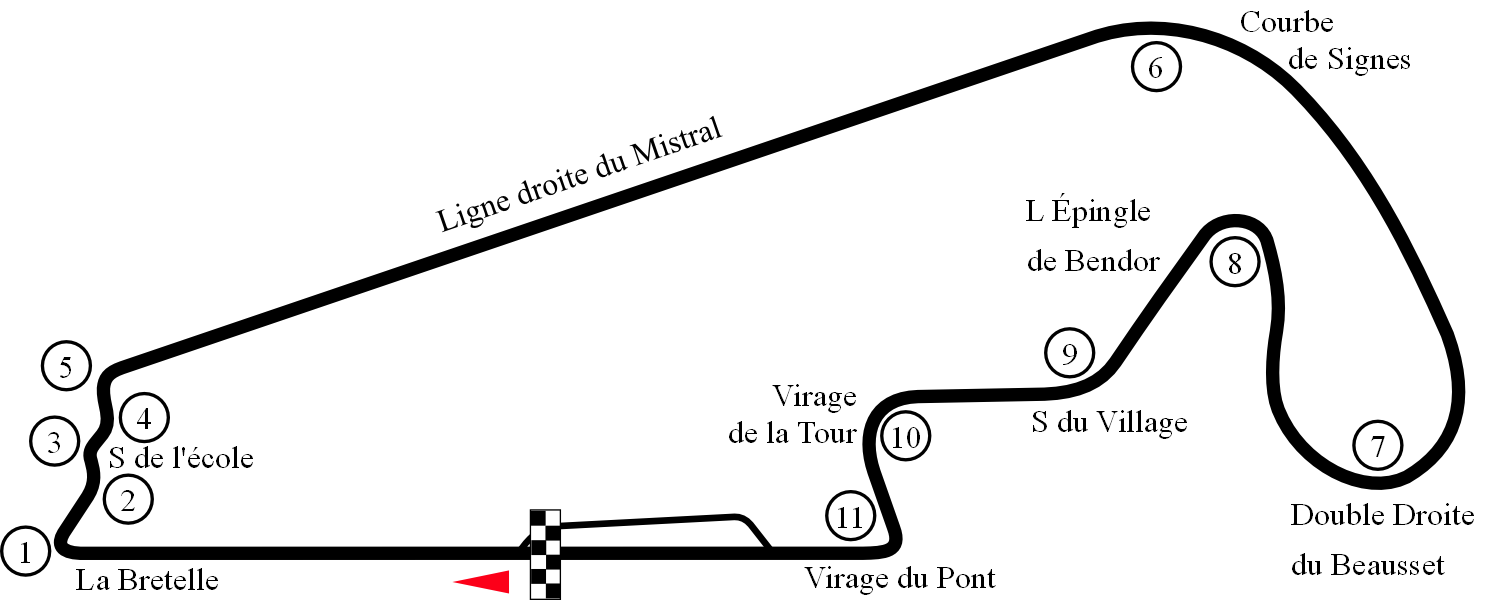
Original short GP layout of Paul Ricard, used in 1991, 1996–1999

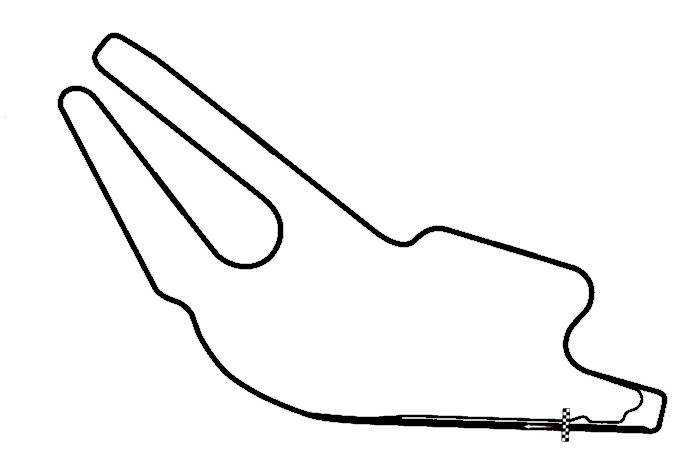
Older layout of Le Mans Bugatti, used in 1989–1990, 1994–1995

Magny-Cours, used in 1992

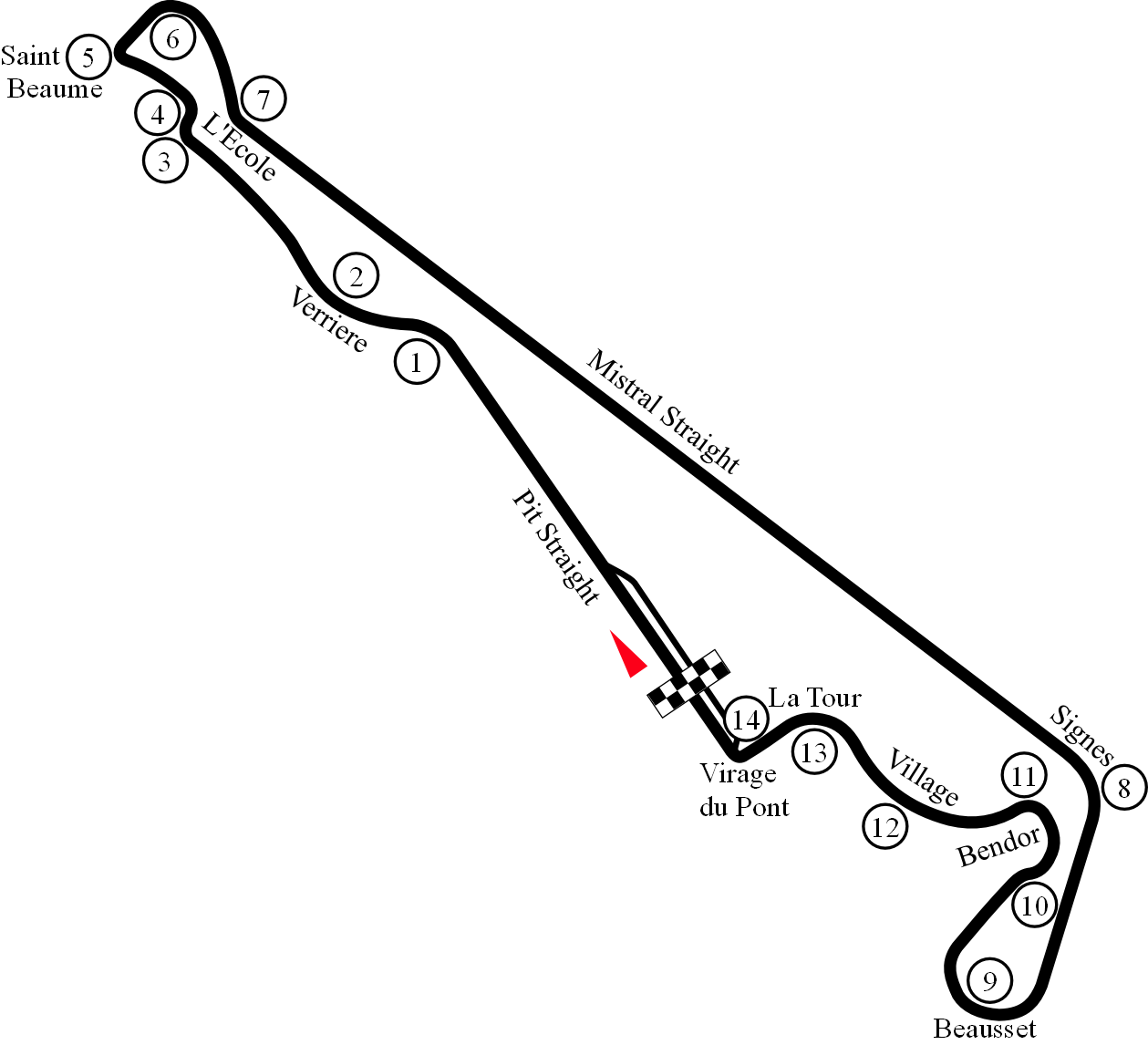
Original long GP layout of Paul Ricard, used in 1973, 1975, 1977, 1980–1981, 1984, 1986, 1988

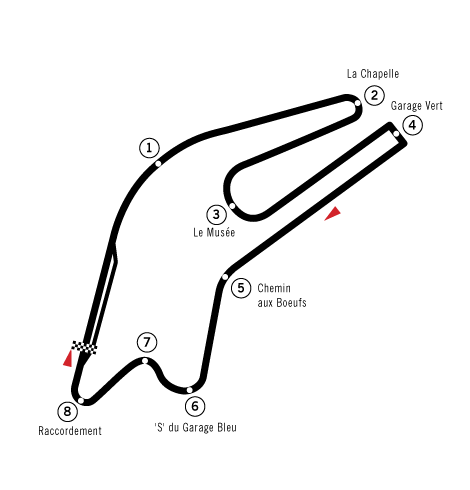
Original layout of Le Mans Bugatti, used in 1969–1970, 1976, 1979, 1983, 1985, 1987

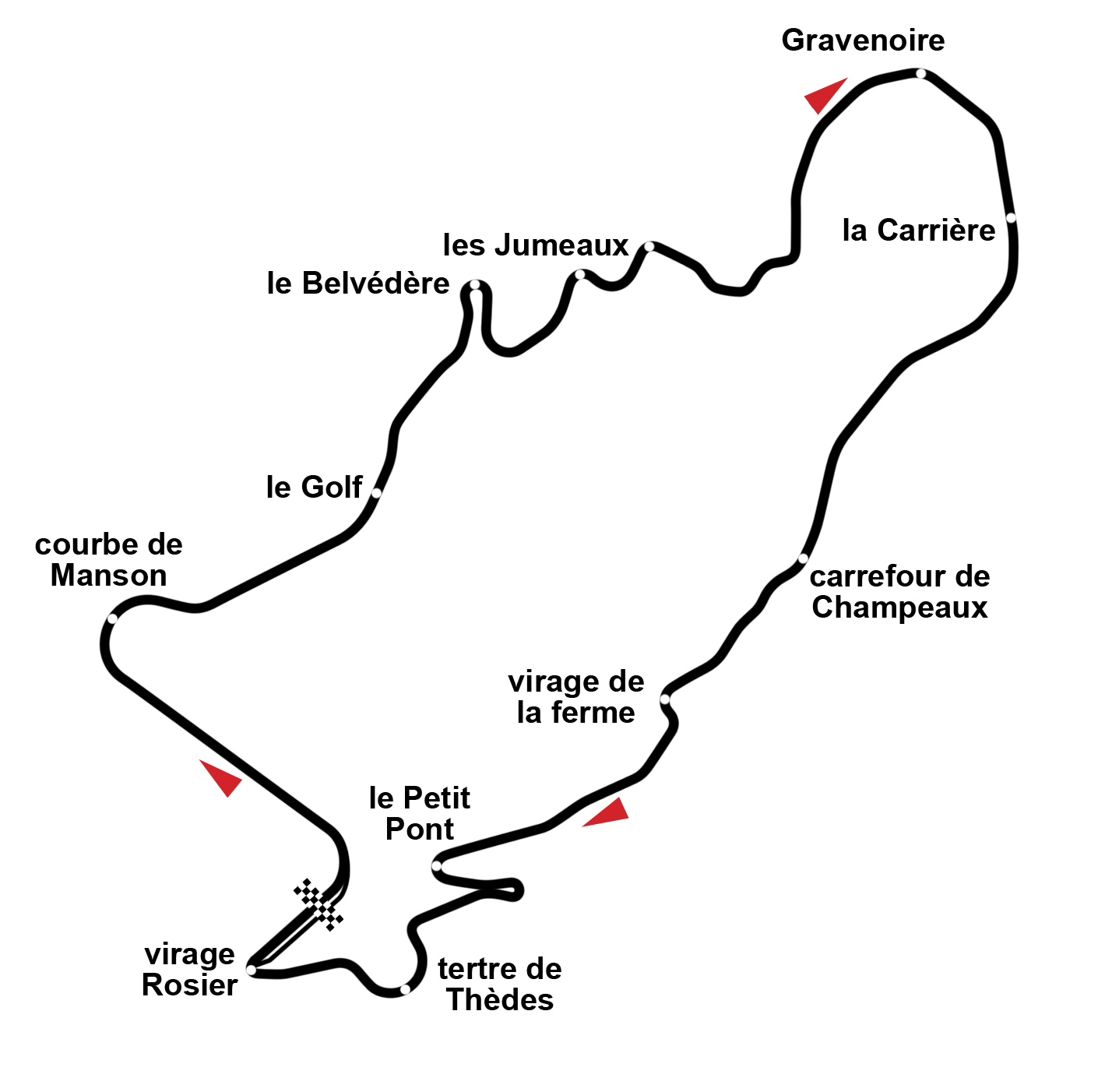
Clermont-Ferrand, used in 1959–1964, 1966–1967, 1972, 1974

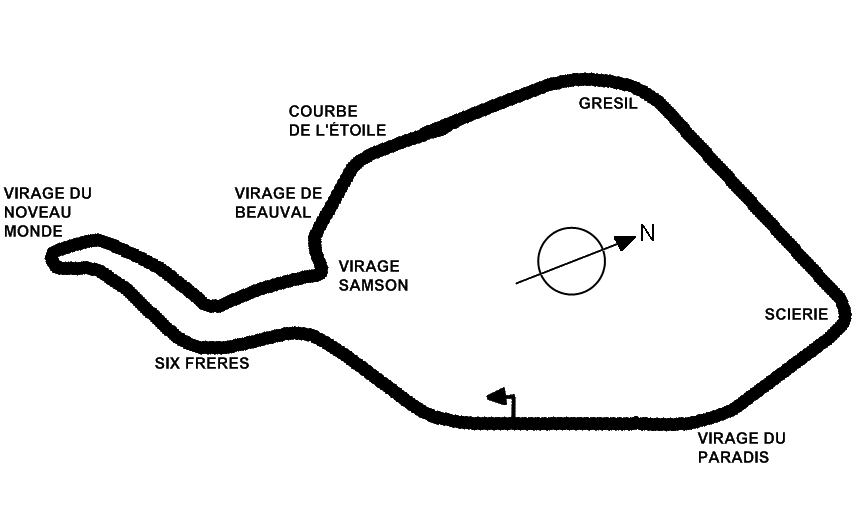
Second layout of Rouen, used in 1965

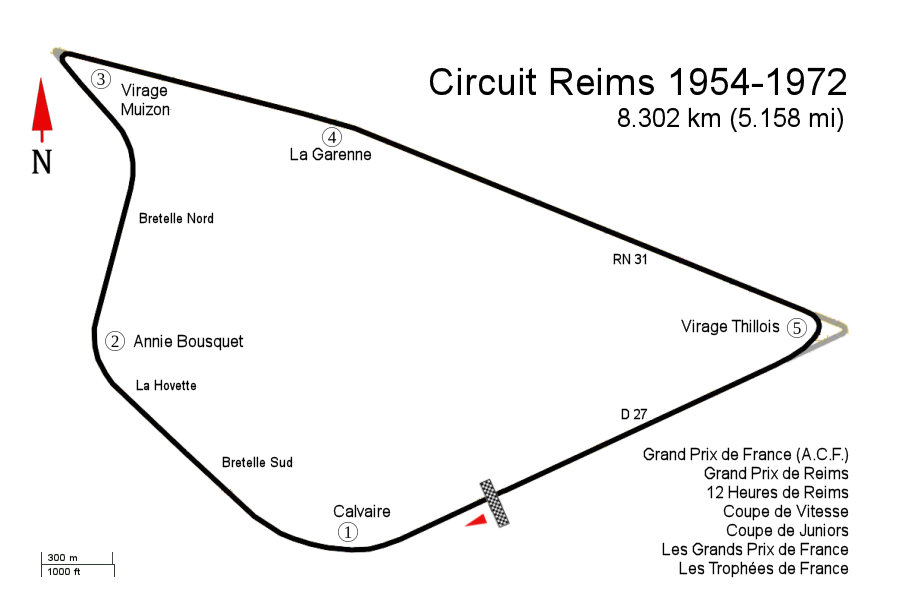
Reims, used in 1954–1955

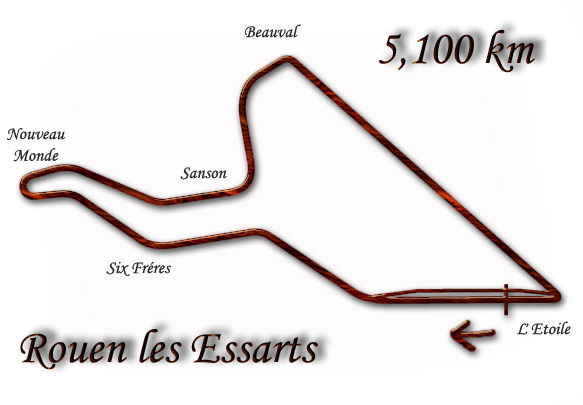
Original layout of Rouen, used in 1953

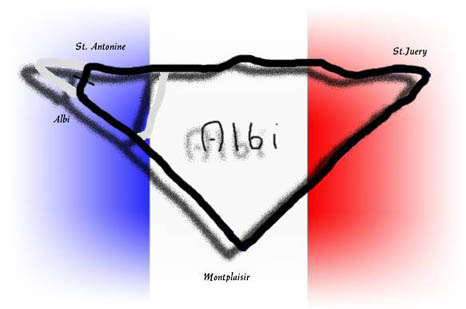
Circuit Les Planques (Albi), used in 1951

== Winners ==
=== Multiple winners (riders) ===
# Wins	Rider	Wins	
# Wins	Rider	Category	Years won
7	(Italy) Giacomo Agostini	500cc	1969, 1970, 1972, 1975
7	(Italy) Giacomo Agostini	350cc	1972, 1973, 1974
6	(Spain) Jorge Lorenzo	MotoGP	2009, 2010, 2012, 2015, 2016
6	(Spain) Jorge Lorenzo	250cc	2007
5	(Spain) Ángel Nieto	125cc	1980, 1981, 1984
5	(Spain) Ángel Nieto	80cc	1985
5	(Spain) Ángel Nieto	50cc	1970
4	(United Kingdom) Phil Read	500cc	1974
4	(United Kingdom) Phil Read	250cc	1964, 1965, 1972
4	(United States) Freddie Spencer	500cc	1983, 1984, 1985
4	(United States) Freddie Spencer	250cc	1985
4	(Australia) Mick Doohan	500cc	1994, 1995, 1996, 1997
4	(Italy) Valentino Rossi	MotoGP	2002, 2005, 2008
4	(Italy) Valentino Rossi	125cc	1997
4	(Spain) Dani Pedrosa	MotoGP	2013
4	(Spain) Dani Pedrosa	250cc	2004, 2005
4	(Spain) Dani Pedrosa	125cc	2003
4	(Switzerland) Thomas Lüthi	Moto2	2012, 2015
4	(Switzerland) Thomas Lüthi	125cc	2005, 2006
4	(Spain) Marc Márquez	MotoGP	2014, 2018, 2019
4	(Spain) Marc Márquez	Moto2	2011
3	(United Kingdom) Geoff Duke	500cc	1953, 1955
3	(United Kingdom) Geoff Duke	350cc	1951
3	(United Kingdom) John Surtees	500cc	1959, 1960
3	(United Kingdom) John Surtees	350cc	1959
3	(New Zealand) Hugh Anderson	125cc	1963, 1965
3	(New Zealand) Hugh Anderson	50cc	1964
3	(Sweden) Kent Andersson	125cc	1973, 1974, 1975
3	(United Kingdom) Barry Sheene	500cc	1976, 1977, 1979
3	(United States) Eddie Lawson	500cc	1986, 1988, 1989
3	(Spain) Àlex Crivillé	500cc	1998, 1999, 2000
3	(Spain) Maverick Viñales	MotoGP	2017
3	(Spain) Maverick Viñales	Moto3	2013
3	(Spain) Maverick Viñales	125cc	2011
2	(France) Pierre Monneret	500cc	1954
2	(France) Pierre Monneret	350cc	1954
2	(Federation of Rhodesia and Nyasaland) Gary Hocking	500cc	1961
2	(Federation of Rhodesia and Nyasaland) Gary Hocking	350cc	1960
2	(Australia) Tom Phillis	250cc	1961
2	(Australia) Tom Phillis	125cc	1961
2	(United Kingdom) Mike Hailwood	350cc	1966
2	(United Kingdom) Mike Hailwood	250cc	1966
2	(United Kingdom) Bill Ivy	250cc	1967
2	(United Kingdom) Bill Ivy	125cc	1967
2	(Finland) Jarno Saarinen	500cc	1973
2	(Finland) Jarno Saarinen	250cc	1973
2	(Venezuela) Johnny Cecotto	350cc	1975
2	(Venezuela) Johnny Cecotto	250cc	1975
2	(Italy) Walter Villa	350cc	1976
2	(Italy) Walter Villa	250cc	1976
2	(Australia) Gregg Hansford	350cc	1978
2	(Australia) Gregg Hansford	250cc	1978
2	(Italy) Pier Paolo Bianchi	125cc	1977, 1978
2	(South Africa) Jon Ekerold	350cc	1980
2	(South Africa) Jon Ekerold	250cc	1977
2	(United States) Kenny Roberts	500cc	1978, 1980
2	(South Africa) Kork Ballington	250cc	1979, 1980
2	(West Germany) Anton Mang	250cc	1981, 1984
2	(Spain) Jorge Martínez	125cc	1988, 1989
2	(Spain) Carlos Cardús	250cc	1989, 1990
2	(Italy) Ezio Gianola	125cc	1985, 1992
2	(Italy) Loris Reggiani	250cc	1991, 1992
2	(United States) Wayne Rainey	500cc	1991, 1992
2	(Italy) Loris Capirossi	250cc	1994
2	(Italy) Loris Capirossi	125cc	1991
2	(Japan) Tetsuya Harada	250cc	1997, 1998
2	(Japan) Tohru Ukawa	250cc	1999, 2000
2	(Italy) Max Biaggi	500cc	2001
2	(Italy) Max Biaggi	250cc	1996
2	(Spain) Sete Gibernau	MotoGP	2003, 2004
2	(Spain) Toni Elías	Moto2	2010
2	(Spain) Toni Elías	250cc	2003
2	(Australia) Jack Miller	MotoGP	2021
2	(Australia) Jack Miller	Moto3	2014
2	(Spain) Sergio García	Moto2	2024
2	(Spain) Sergio García	Moto3	2021
2	(Italy) Nicholas Spinelli	MotoE	2024 Race 1, 2024 Race 2
2	(Spain) Jorge Martín	MotoGP	2024, 2026

=== Multiple winners (manufacturers) ===
# Wins	Manufacturer	Wins	
# Wins	Manufacturer	Category	Years won
53	(Japan) Honda	MotoGP	2002, 2003, 2004, 2006, 2011, 2013, 2014, 2018, 2019, 2025
53	(Japan) Honda	500cc	1983, 1984, 1985, 1989, 1994, 1995, 1996, 1997, 1998, 1999, 2000
53	(Japan) Honda	350cc	1966
53	(Japan) Honda	250cc	1961, 1962, 1966, 1985, 1987, 1988, 1989, 1990, 1994, 1995, 1999, 2000, 2001, 2004, 2005, 2006
53	(Japan) Honda	Moto3	2017, 2019
53	(Japan) Honda	125cc	1961, 1962, 1964, 1990, 1991, 1992, 1994, 1995, 2003, 2004, 2005, 2006
53	(Japan) Honda	50cc	1965
40	(Japan) Yamaha	MotoGP	2005, 2008, 2009, 2010, 2012, 2015, 2016, 2017
40	(Japan) Yamaha	500cc	1973, 1975, 1978, 1980, 1986, 1987, 1988, 1991, 1992, 2001
40	(Japan) Yamaha	350cc	1974, 1975, 1977, 1979, 1980
40	(Japan) Yamaha	250cc	1964, 1965, 1967, 1970, 1972, 1973, 1975, 1977, 1982, 1983, 1984, 1986
40	(Japan) Yamaha	125cc	1967, 1969, 1973, 1974, 1975
18	(Italy) Aprilia	MotoGP	2026
18	(Italy) Aprilia	250cc	1991, 1992, 1996, 1997, 1998, 2002, 2003, 2007, 2008
18	(Italy) Aprilia	125cc	1996, 1997, 1998, 1999, 2002, 2007, 2009, 2011
12	(Italy) MV Agusta	500cc	1959, 1960, 1961, 1969, 1970, 1972, 1974
12	(Italy) MV Agusta	350cc	1959, 1960, 1972, 1973
12	(Italy) MV Agusta	125cc	1955
12	(Germany) Kalex	Moto2	2013, 2014, 2015, 2016, 2017, 2018, 2019, 2020, 2021, 2022, 2023, 2025, 2026
11	(Japan) Suzuki	500cc	1976, 1977, 1979, 1981, 1990, 2007
11	(Japan) Suzuki	125cc	1963, 1965, 1970
11	(Japan) Suzuki	50cc	1964, 1967
11	(Italy) Ducati	MotoGP	2020, 2021, 2022, 2023, 2024
11	(Italy) Ducati	MotoE	2023 Race 1, 2023 Race 2, 2024 Race 1, 2024 Race 2, 2025 Race 1, 2025 Race 2
10	(Austria) KTM	Moto3	2013, 2014, 2015, 2016, 2018, 2020, 2022, 2023, 2025, 2026
7	(Spain) Derbi	125cc	1988, 1989, 2000, 2008, 2010
7	(Spain) Derbi	80cc	1985
7	(Spain) Derbi	50cc	1970
6	(Japan) Kawasaki	350cc	1978, 1982
6	(Japan) Kawasaki	250cc	1978, 1979, 1980, 1981
6	(Italy) Gilera	500cc	1951, 1953, 1954, 1955
6	(Italy) Gilera	250cc	2009
6	(Italy) Gilera	125cc	2001
5	(West Germany) Kreidler	50cc	1962, 1963, 1969, 1976, 1979
4	(Italy) Morbidelli	125cc	1972, 1977, 1982, 1983
4	(Italy) Garelli	125cc	1984, 1985, 1986, 1987
3	(Italy) Moto Guzzi	350cc	1953, 1955
3	(Italy) Moto Guzzi	250cc	1951
3	(Italy) Minarelli	125cc	1978, 1980, 1981
2	(United States) Harley-Davidson	350cc	1976
2	(United States) Harley-Davidson	250cc	1976
2	(Switzerland) Suter	Moto2	2011, 2012
2	(Italy) Boscoscuro	Moto2	2024, 2026

=== By year ===
A pink background indicates an event that was not part of the Grand Prix motorcycle racing championship.

Year	Track	Moto3		Moto2		MotoGP		Report
Year	Track	Rider	Manufacturer	Rider	Manufacturer	Rider	Manufacturer	Report
2026	Le Mans	(Spain) Máximo Quiles	KTM	(Spain) Izan Guevara	Boscoscuro	(Spain) Jorge Martín	Aprilia	Report

Year	Track	MotoE				Moto3		Moto2		MotoGP		Report
Year	Track	Race 1		Race 2		Moto3		Moto2		MotoGP		Report
Year	Track	Rider	Manufacturer	Rider	Manufacturer	Rider	Manufacturer	Rider	Manufacturer	Rider	Manufacturer	Report
2025	Le Mans	(Spain) Óscar Gutiérrez	Ducati	(Italy) Mattia Casadei	Ducati	(Spain) José Antonio Rueda	KTM	(Spain) Manuel González	Kalex	(France) Johann Zarco	Honda	Report
2024	Le Mans	(Italy) Nicholas Spinelli	Ducati	(Italy) Nicholas Spinelli	Ducati	(Colombia) David Alonso	CFMoto	(Spain) Sergio García	Boscoscuro	(Spain) Jorge Martín	Ducati	Report
2023	Le Mans	(Spain) Jordi Torres	Ducati	(Italy) Matteo Ferrari	Ducati	(Spain) Daniel Holgado	KTM	(Italy) Tony Arbolino	Kalex	(Italy) Marco Bezzecchi	Ducati	Report
2022	Le Mans	(Italy) Mattia Casadei	Energica	(Switzerland) Dominique Aegerter	Energica	(Spain) Jaume Masià	KTM	(Spain) Augusto Fernández	Kalex	(Italy) Enea Bastianini	Ducati	Report
2021	Le Mans	(Brazil) Eric Granado	Energica	—N/a		(Spain) Sergio García	GasGas	(Spain) Raúl Fernández	Kalex	(Australia) Jack Miller	Ducati	Report
2020	Le Mans	(Spain) Jordi Torres	Energica	(Finland) Niki Tuuli	Energica	(Italy) Celestino Vietti	KTM	(United Kingdom) Sam Lowes	Kalex	(Italy) Danilo Petrucci	Ducati	Report

Year	Track	Moto3		Moto2		MotoGP		Report
Year	Track	Rider	Manufacturer	Rider	Manufacturer	Rider	Manufacturer	Report
2019	Le Mans	(United Kingdom) John McPhee	Honda	(Spain) Álex Márquez	Kalex	(Spain) Marc Márquez	Honda	Report
2018	Le Mans	(Spain) Albert Arenas	KTM	(Italy) Francesco Bagnaia	Kalex	(Spain) Marc Márquez	Honda	Report
2017	Le Mans	(Spain) Joan Mir	Honda	(Italy) Franco Morbidelli	Kalex	(Spain) Maverick Viñales	Yamaha	Report
2016	Le Mans	(South Africa) Brad Binder	KTM	(Spain) Álex Rins	Kalex	(Spain) Jorge Lorenzo	Yamaha	Report
2015	Le Mans	(Italy) Romano Fenati	KTM	(Switzerland) Thomas Lüthi	Kalex	(Spain) Jorge Lorenzo	Yamaha	Report
2014	Le Mans	(Australia) Jack Miller	KTM	(Finland) Mika Kallio	Kalex	(Spain) Marc Márquez	Honda	Report
2013	Le Mans	(Spain) Maverick Viñales	KTM	(United Kingdom) Scott Redding	Kalex	(Spain) Dani Pedrosa	Honda	Report
2012	Le Mans	(France) Louis Rossi	FTR Honda	(Switzerland) Thomas Lüthi	Suter	(Spain) Jorge Lorenzo	Yamaha	Report
Year	Track	125cc		Moto2		MotoGP		Report
Year	Track	Rider	Manufacturer	Rider	Manufacturer	Rider	Manufacturer	Report
2011	Le Mans	(Spain) Maverick Viñales	Aprilia	(Spain) Marc Márquez	Suter	(Australia) Casey Stoner	Honda	Report
2010	Le Mans	(Spain) Pol Espargaró	Derbi	(Spain) Toni Elías	Moriwaki	(Spain) Jorge Lorenzo	Yamaha	Report
Year	Track	125cc		250cc		MotoGP		Report
Year	Track	Rider	Manufacturer	Rider	Manufacturer	Rider	Manufacturer	Report
2009	Le Mans	(Spain) Julián Simón	Aprilia	(Italy) Marco Simoncelli	Gilera	(Spain) Jorge Lorenzo	Yamaha	Report
2008	Le Mans	(France) Mike Di Meglio	Derbi	(Spain) Alex Debón	Aprilia	(Italy) Valentino Rossi	Yamaha	Report
2007	Le Mans	(Spain) Sergio Gadea	Aprilia	(Spain) Jorge Lorenzo	Aprilia	(Australia) Chris Vermeulen	Suzuki	Report
2006	Le Mans	(Switzerland) Thomas Lüthi	Honda	(Japan) Yuki Takahashi	Honda	(Italy) Marco Melandri	Honda	Report
2005	Le Mans	(Switzerland) Thomas Lüthi	Honda	(Spain) Daniel Pedrosa	Honda	(Italy) Valentino Rossi	Yamaha	Report
2004	Le Mans	(Italy) Andrea Dovizioso	Honda	(Spain) Daniel Pedrosa	Honda	(Spain) Sete Gibernau	Honda	Report
2003	Le Mans	(Spain) Daniel Pedrosa	Honda	(Spain) Toni Elías	Aprilia	(Spain) Sete Gibernau	Honda	Report
2002	Le Mans	(Italy) Lucio Cecchinello	Aprilia	(Spain) Fonsi Nieto	Aprilia	(Italy) Valentino Rossi	Honda	Report
Year	Track	125cc		250cc		500cc		Report
Year	Track	Rider	Manufacturer	Rider	Manufacturer	Rider	Manufacturer	Report
2001	Le Mans	(San Marino) Manuel Poggiali	Gilera	(Japan) Daijiro Kato	Honda	(Italy) Max Biaggi	Yamaha	Report
2000	Le Mans	(Japan) Youichi Ui	Derbi	(Japan) Tohru Ukawa	Honda	(Spain) Àlex Crivillé	Honda	Report
1999	Paul Ricard	(Italy) Roberto Locatelli	Aprilia	(Japan) Tohru Ukawa	Honda	(Spain) Àlex Crivillé	Honda	Report
1998	Paul Ricard	(Japan) Kazuto Sakata	Aprilia	(Japan) Tetsuya Harada	Aprilia	(Spain) Àlex Crivillé	Honda	Report
1997	Paul Ricard	(Italy) Valentino Rossi	Aprilia	(Japan) Tetsuya Harada	Aprilia	(Australia) Mick Doohan	Honda	Report
1996	Paul Ricard	(Italy) Stefano Perugini	Aprilia	(Italy) Max Biaggi	Aprilia	(Australia) Mick Doohan	Honda	Report
1995	Le Mans	(Japan) Haruchika Aoki	Honda	(Germany) Ralf Waldmann	Honda	(Australia) Mick Doohan	Honda	Report
1994	Le Mans	(Japan) Noboru Ueda	Honda	(Italy) Loris Capirossi	Honda	(Australia) Mick Doohan	Honda	Report
1992	Magny-Cours	(Italy) Ezio Gianola	Honda	(Italy) Loris Reggiani	Aprilia	(United States) Wayne Rainey	Yamaha	Report
1991	Paul Ricard	(Italy) Loris Capirossi	Honda	(Italy) Loris Reggiani	Aprilia	(United States) Wayne Rainey	Yamaha	Report
1990	Le Mans	(Netherlands) Hans Spaan	Honda	(Spain) Carlos Cardús	Honda	(United States) Kevin Schwantz	Suzuki	Report

Year	Track	80cc		125cc		250cc		500cc		Report
Year	Track	Rider	Manufacturer	Rider	Manufacturer	Rider	Manufacturer	Rider	Manufacturer	Report
1989	Le Mans			(Spain) Jorge Martínez	Derbi	(Spain) Carlos Cardús	Honda	(United States) Eddie Lawson	Honda	Report
1988	Paul Ricard			(Spain) Jorge Martínez	Derbi	(Switzerland) Jacques Cornu	Honda	(United States) Eddie Lawson	Yamaha	Report
1987	Le Mans			(Italy) Fausto Gresini	Garelli	(West Germany) Reinhold Roth	Honda	(United States) Randy Mamola	Yamaha	Report
1986	Paul Ricard			(Italy) Luca Cadalora	Garelli	(Venezuela) Carlos Lavado	Yamaha	(United States) Eddie Lawson	Yamaha	Report
1985	Le Mans	(Spain) Ángel Nieto	Derbi	(Italy) Ezio Gianola	Garelli	(United States) Freddie Spencer	Honda	(United States) Freddie Spencer	Honda	Report
1984	Paul Ricard			(Spain) Ángel Nieto	Garelli	(West Germany) Anton Mang	Yamaha	(United States) Freddie Spencer	Honda	Report
Year	Track	50cc		125cc		250cc		500cc		Report
Year	Track	Rider	Manufacturer	Rider	Manufacturer	Rider	Manufacturer	Rider	Manufacturer	Report
1983	Le Mans	(Switzerland) Stefan Dörflinger	Krauser	(Spain) Ricardo Tormo	Morbidelli MBA	(United Kingdom) Alan Carter	Yamaha	(United States) Freddie Spencer	Honda	Report

Year	Track	50cc		125cc		250cc		350cc		500cc		Report
Year	Track	Rider	Manufacturer	Rider	Manufacturer	Rider	Manufacturer	Rider	Manufacturer	Rider	Manufacturer	Report
1982	Nogaro			(France) Jean-Claude Selini	Morbidelli MBA	(France) Jean-Louis Tournadre	Yamaha	(France) Jean-François Baldé	Kawasaki	(Switzerland) Michel Frutschi	Sanvenero	Report
1981	Paul Ricard			(Spain) Ángel Nieto	Minarelli	(West Germany) Anton Mang	Kawasaki			(Italy) Marco Lucchinelli	Suzuki	Report
1980	Paul Ricard			(Spain) Ángel Nieto	Minarelli	(South Africa) Kork Ballington	Kawasaki	(South Africa) Jon Ekerold	Yamaha	(United States) Kenny Roberts	Yamaha	Report
1979	Le Mans	(Italy) Eugenio Lazzarini	Kreidler	(France) Guy Bertin	Motobécane	(South Africa) Kork Ballington	Kawasaki	(France) Patrick Fernandez	Yamaha	(United Kingdom) Barry Sheene	Suzuki	Report
1978	Nogaro			(Italy) Pier Paolo Bianchi	Minarelli	(Australia) Gregg Hansford	Kawasaki	(Australia) Gregg Hansford	Kawasaki	(United States) Kenny Roberts	Yamaha	Report
1977	Paul Ricard			(Italy) Pier Paolo Bianchi	Morbidelli	(South Africa) Jon Ekerold	Yamaha	(Japan) Takazumi Katayama	Yamaha	(United Kingdom) Barry Sheene	Suzuki	Report
1976	Le Mans	(West Germany) Herbert Rittberger	Kreidler			(Italy) Walter Villa	Harley-Davidson	(Italy) Walter Villa	Harley-Davidson	(United Kingdom) Barry Sheene	Suzuki	Report
1975	Paul Ricard			(Sweden) Kent Andersson	Yamaha	(Venezuela) Johnny Cecotto	Yamaha	(Venezuela) Johnny Cecotto	Yamaha	(Italy) Giacomo Agostini	Yamaha	Report
1974	Clermont-Ferrand	(Netherlands) Henk van Kessel	Van Veen Kreidler	(Sweden) Kent Andersson	Yamaha			(Italy) Giacomo Agostini	Yamaha	(United Kingdom) Phil Read	MV Agusta	Report
1973	Paul Ricard			(Sweden) Kent Andersson	Yamaha	(Finland) Jarno Saarinen	Yamaha	(Italy) Giacomo Agostini	MV Agusta	(Finland) Jarno Saarinen	Yamaha	Report
1972	Clermont-Ferrand			(Italy) Gilberto Parlotti	Morbidelli	(United Kingdom) Phil Read	Yamaha	(Italy) Giacomo Agostini	MV Agusta	(Italy) Giacomo Agostini	MV Agusta	Report
1970	Le Mans	(Spain) Ángel Nieto	Derbi	(West Germany) Dieter Braun	Suzuki	(United Kingdom) Rodney Gould	Yamaha			(Italy) Giacomo Agostini	MV Agusta	Report
1969	Le Mans	(Netherlands) Aalt Toersen	Kreidler	(France) Jean Auréal	Yamaha	(Spain) Santiago Herrero	Ossa			(Italy) Giacomo Agostini	MV Agusta	Report
1967	Clermont-Ferrand	(Japan) Yoshimi Katayama	Suzuki	(United Kingdom) Bill Ivy	Yamaha	(United Kingdom) Bill Ivy	Yamaha					Report
1966	Clermont-Ferrand					(United Kingdom) Mike Hailwood	Honda	(United Kingdom) Mike Hailwood	Honda			Report
1965	Rouen	(United Kingdom) Ralph Bryans	Honda	(New Zealand) Hugh Anderson	Suzuki	(United Kingdom) Phil Read	Yamaha					Report
1964	Clermont-Ferrand	(New Zealand) Hugh Anderson	Suzuki	(Switzerland) Luigi Taveri	Honda	(United Kingdom) Phil Read	Yamaha					Report
1963	Clermont-Ferrand	(West Germany) Hans-Georg Anscheidt	Kreidler	(New Zealand) Hugh Anderson	Suzuki							Report
1962	Clermont-Ferrand	(Netherlands) Jan Huberts	Kreidler	(Japan) Kunimitsu Takahashi	Honda	(Federation of Rhodesia and Nyasaland) Jim Redman	Honda					Report
Year	Track			125cc		250cc		350cc		500cc		Report
Year	Track	Rider	Manufacturer	Rider	Manufacturer	Rider	Manufacturer	Rider	Manufacturer	Rider	Manufacturer	Report
1961	Clermont-Ferrand			(Australia) Tom Phillis	Honda	(Australia) Tom Phillis	Honda			(Federation of Rhodesia and Nyasaland) Gary Hocking	MV Agusta	Report
1960	Clermont-Ferrand							(Federation of Rhodesia and Nyasaland) Gary Hocking	MV Agusta	(United Kingdom) John Surtees	MV Agusta	Report
1959	Clermont-Ferrand							(United Kingdom) John Surtees	MV Agusta	(United Kingdom) John Surtees	MV Agusta	Report
1958	Pau							(France) Jacques Collot		(France) Jacques Collot		Report
1955	Reims			(Italy) Carlo Ubbiali	MV Agusta			(Italy) Duilio Agostini	Moto Guzzi	(United Kingdom) Geoff Duke	Gilera	Report
1954	Reims					(West Germany) Werner Haas	NSU	(France) Pierre Monneret	AJS	(France) Pierre Monneret	Gilera	Report
1953	Rouen							(United Kingdom) Fergus Anderson	Moto Guzzi	(United Kingdom) Geoff Duke	Gilera	Report

Year	Track	175cc		250cc		350cc		500cc		Report
Year	Track	Rider	Manufacturer	Rider	Manufacturer	Rider	Manufacturer	Rider	Manufacturer	Report
1952	Albi	(France) Georges Burgraff		(United Kingdom) Fergus Anderson		(United Kingdom) Jack Brett		(United Kingdom) Jack Brett		Report
1951	Albi			(Italy) Bruno Ruffo	Moto Guzzi	(United Kingdom) Geoff Duke	Norton	(Italy) Alfredo Milani	Gilera	Report

Year	Track	175cc	250cc	350cc	500cc	Report
1949	Saint-Gaudens		(United Kingdom) Fergus Anderson	(United Kingdom) David Whitworth	(United Kingdom) Leslie Graham	Report
1939	Reims		(Germany) Ewald Kluge	(Germany) Heiner Fleischmann	(United Kingdom) John White	Report
1938	Reims		(Germany) Ewald Kluge	(France) Roger Loyer	(Switzerland) Georges Cordey	Report
1937	Montlhéry	(Belgium) "Dickwell"	(France) Roger Loyer	(United Kingdom) Ted Mellors	(United Kingdom) Ted Mellors	Report
1936	Saint-Gaudens	(France) Henry Nougier	(France) Georges Monneret	(United Kingdom) Ted Mellors	(Sweden) Ragnar Sunnqvist	Report
1935	Montlhéry	(France) Jean Térigi	(Sweden) Ove Lambert-Meuller	(Sweden) Carl Bagenholm	(Belgium) René Milhoux	Report
1933	Dieppe	(United Kingdom) Eric Fernihough	(Republic of Ireland) Charlie Manders	(United Kingdom) Jimmie Simpson	(United Kingdom) Tim Hunt	Report
1932	Reims	(United Kingdom) Eric Fernihough	(United Kingdom) Leo Davenport	(United Kingdom) Jimmie Simpson	(Republic of Ireland) Stanley Woods	Report
1931	Montlhéry	(United Kingdom) Eric Fernihough	(United Kingdom) Graham Walker	(United Kingdom) Ernie Nott	(United Kingdom) Tim Hunt	Report
1930	Pau	(United Kingdom) Eric Fernihough	(United Kingdom) Ted Mellors	(United Kingdom) Freddie Hicks	(Republic of Ireland) Stanley Woods	Report
1929	Le Mans	(France) Albert Sourdot	(United Kingdom) Syd Crabtree	(United Kingdom) Freddie Hicks	(United Kingdom) Charlie Dodson	Report
1928	Bordeaux	(France) Marcel Jolly	(United Kingdom) Syd Crabtree		(Republic of Ireland) Stanley Woods	Report
1927	Saint-Gaudens	(France) Albert Sourdot	(United Kingdom) Syd Crabtree	(United Kingdom) Frank Longman	(United Kingdom) Joe Craig	Report
1926	Strasbourg	(France) Lucien Lemasson	(United Kingdom) Syd Crabtree	(France) Jean Roland	(United Kingdom) Alec Bennett	Report
1925	Montlhéry	(France) Albert Sourdot	(France) Jean Roland	(United Kingdom) J. Stevens	(United Kingdom) Jimmie Simpson	Report
1924	Lyon	(France) Albert Sourdot	(France) Paul Meunier	(United Kingdom) Frank Longman	(United Kingdom) Alec Bennett	Report
1923	Tours		(United Kingdom) Geoff Davison	(United Kingdom) Frank Longman	(United Kingdom) Jim Whalley	Report
1922	Strasbourg		(United Kingdom) Geoff Davison	(Italy) Erminio Visioli	(United Kingdom) Alec Bennett	Report
1921	Le Mans		(France) "Vernisse"	(France) Paul Meunier	(United Kingdom) Alec Bennett	Report
1920	Le Mans		(France) Marcel Mourier	(United Kingdom) Kenelm Bartlett	(France) Georges Jolly	Report
