= Louis Rosier =

French racing driver (1905–1956)

- Rosier in 1953
- Born: Louis Claude Rosier; 5 November 1905; Chapdes-Beaufort, Puy-de-Dôme, France
- Died: 29 October 1956 (aged 50); Neuilly-sur-Seine, Hauts-de-Seine, France
- Cause of death: Injuries sustained at the 1956 Coupe du Salon
- Children: Jean-Louis Rosier

Formula One World Championship career
- Nationality: (France) French
- Active years: 1950–1956
- Team(s): Rosier, Talbot-Lago, privateer Talbot-Lago, Maserati
- Entries: 38
- Championships: 0
- Wins: 0
- Podiums: 2
- Career points: 18
- Pole positions: 0
- Fastest laps: 0
- First entry: 1950 British Grand Prix
- Last entry: 1956 German Grand Prix

24 Hours of Le Mans career
- Years: 1938, 1949–1956
- Teams: Talbot, Rosier, Ferrari
- Best finish: 1st (1950)
- Class wins: 1 (1950)

Louis Claude Rosier (French pronunciation: [lwi ʁozje]; 5 November 1905 – 29 October 1956) was a French racing driver and motorsport executive, who competed in Formula One from 1950 to 1956. In endurance racing, Rosier won the 24 Hours of Le Mans in 1950 in a privateer Talbot-Lago T26C-GS.

Rosier competed in Formula One under his own Écurie Rosier banner, making privateer entries in machinery from Talbot-Lago, Ferrari, and Maserati; he also competed for the works teams of Talbot and Maserati, the former of which he scored back-to-back podium finishes with at the Swiss and Belgian Grands Prix in 1950.

Rosier competed in nine editions of the 24 Hours of Le Mans between 1938 and 1956, winning in 1950 alongside his son Jean-Louis Rosier, which remains the only father-and-son victory in Le Mans history. In October 1956, Rosier died as a result of injuries sustained whilst sportscar racing in a Ferrari 750 Monza at Montlhéry.

== Career highlights ==
Rosier was born on 5 November 1905 in Chapdes-Beaufort, Puy-de-Dôme, France.

Rosier participated in 38 Formula One World Championship Grands Prix, debuting on 13 May 1950. He achieved two podiums, and scored a total of 18 championship points. He won the Dutch Grand Prix twice in consecutive years between 1950 and 1951, the Circuit d'Albi, Grand-Prix de l'Albigeois and the 24 Hours of Le Mans with his son Jean-Louis Rosier. Rosier owned the Renault dealership of Clermont-Ferrand.

In 2016, in an academic paper that reported a mathematical modeling study that assessed the relative influence of driver and machine, Rosier was ranked the 19th best Formula One driver of all time.

== Formula One and sports car competition ==
Rosier finished fourth at Silverstone in a Talbot, in October 1948. The event was the RAC International Grand Prix, the first grand prix to be held in England since 1927. He drove a 4.5-liter, unsupercharged Talbot-Lago to third place at the 1949 British Grand Prix at Silverstone. He was a lap behind the winner with a speed of 76.21 miles per hour (122.65 km/h). Rosier won an International Grand Prix at Spa-Francorchamps in June 1949. He piloted a Talbot in the 500-kilometre (310 mi), 32-lap event, achieving a time of three hours, 15 minutes, and 17 seconds. He assumed the lead after 23 laps, coming across the finish line ahead of Luigi Villoresi. Rosier won the 1950 24 Hours of Le Mans in a blue Talbot. He teamed up with his son Jean-Louis Rosier who only drove two laps during the race, which means Louis won the race practically by himself. He finished one lap ahead of Pierre Meyrat who drove a car of the same marque. The Rosiers covered 256 laps, 2,163 miles (3,481 km), in 23:54:2.2. Rosier captured the Grand Prix d'Albi in Albi, France in May 1953. He drove a Ferrari, covering the 18 laps of the finals, 160 kilometres (99 mi), in 56:36:8. He averaged 160 kilometres per hour (99.42 mph). Rosier placed second in a Ferrari at a Grand Prix in Aix-Les-Bains, in July 1953. His time was 2:24:48.1. In April 1956, Rosier finished fourth in a Maserati, in a 201-mile race at Aintree. Stirling Moss drove a blue Maserati to victory in the 67-lap event for Formula One cars, with an average speed of 84.24 miles per hour (135.57 km/h). Rosier finished 5th at the 1956 German Grand Prix behind the wheel of a Maserati.

== Écurie Rosier ==
Louis Rosier was the owner and manager of a racing team, the "Ecurie Rosier". Originally set up to run Rosier's Talbot-Lago T26 (for either Rosier or a guest driver), and later evolved to an actual team running 250Fs and finally Ferrari 500s simultaneously for Rosier and another driver. Throughout the 1950s, Écurie Rosier provided drives in Formula One for Henri Louveau, Georges Grignard, Louis Chiron, Maurice Trintignant, André Simon and Robert Manzon.

== Circuit Louis Rosier ==
Louis Rosier was one of the key sponsors of the Charade race track. After World War II, Jean Auchatraire (president of the racing section of the local Automobile Club) and Louis Rosier promoted the idea of a race track around Clermont-Ferrand.

A set of preliminary designs were drawn up for a circuit of a length between 4 and 6 km, meeting the latest safety regulations with large parking capacity at a location just outside the city limits on a hilly landscape.

The Le Mans disaster (death toll: 84 lives) on 11 June 1955 brought the project to a halt. All race events were postponed. No further events were allowed to take place on temporary urban tracks. Racing events were only to be allowed on dedicated race-tracks, providing that they met a new set of rules. In Clermont-Ferrand, as was the case for many other new race tracks, new safety devices were being imagined and discussed, reviewed and assessed. But the concept of a "mountain race track" moved forward. It would be the only one of its kind in France.

Auchatraire, Rosier and Raymond Roche (the manager of Reims-Gueux race track) worked together to get the project accepted by the political community before searching for funding. But Rosier was killed at Montlhéry on 26 October 1956 and would not witness his project come to fruition. The racetrack was opened on 27 July 1958, with the name of its famous founder "Circuit de Charade Louis Rosier". Soon after, several champions participated in racing events on the track, each of them, including Stirling Moss, making very positive statements about the track and its surrounding.

== Car manufacturer ==
Rosier's Renault dealership in Clermont-Ferrand was one of the largest Renault dealerships in France. Rosier's dealership also sold other industrial and farming equipment. The building housing this important business has been destroyed.

In 1951, Rosier designed a prototype based on the 4CV Renault.

In 1953, using the concept of a barchetta that he raced at Le Mans, Rosier, together with Italian coachbuilder Rocco Motto, designed a cabriolet, still using 4CV Renault sub assemblies. This model was built in a quantity of about 200 units by Brissonneau. It was even introduced at a car show in New York.

Some time later, Rosier designed a roadster using Renault Frégate elements with an aluminum body developed by Rocco Motto, on a multi-tubular frame. The engine was seriously revised, the body was lightened, the results was an interesting 950 kg for 80 hp.

== Death ==
On 7 October 1956, Rosier was competing in the Coupe du Salon sports car race at Montlhéry in a Ferrari 750 Monza. During the race he crashed, sustaining head injuries. Three weeks later, on 29 October 1956, Rosier succumbed to the injuries received in the crash.

== Racing record ==
=== Post WWII Grandes Épreuves results ===
(key)

Year	Entrant	Chassis	Engine	1	2	3	4	5
1947	L. Rosier	Talbot Spéciale	Talbot 4.0 L6	SUI; 15	BEL; 6	ITA	FRA; 4	
1948	L. Rosier	Talbot-Lago T26C	Talbot 23CV 4.5 L6	MON; Ret	SUI; Ret	FRA; 6	ITA; 6	
1949	Ecurie Rosier	Talbot-Lago T26C	Talbot 23CV 4.5 L6	GBR; 3		SUI; 6	FRA; 4	ITA; Ret
1949	Automobiles Talbot-Darracq	Talbot-Lago T26C	Talbot 23CV 4.5 L6		BEL; 1			

=== Complete Formula One World Championship results ===
(key) (Races in bold indicate pole position; Races in italics indicate fastest lap)

Year	Entrant	Chassis	Engine	1	2	3	4	5	6	7	8	9	WDC	Points
1950	Ecurie Rosier	Talbot-Lago T26C	Talbot 23CV 4.5 L6	GBR; 5	MON; Ret	500				ITA; 4			4th	13
1950	Automobiles Talbot-Darracq	Talbot-Lago T26C-DA	Talbot 23CV 4.5 L6				SUI; 3	BEL; 3	FRA; Ret				4th	13
1950	Charles Pozzi	Talbot-Lago T26C	Talbot 23CV 4.5 L6						FRA; 6^{1}				4th	13
1951	Ecurie Rosier	Talbot-Lago T26C-DA	Talbot 23CV 4.5 L6	SUI; 9	500	BEL; 4	FRA; Ret	GBR; 10	GER; 8	ITA; 7	ESP; 7		13th	3
1952	Ecurie Rosier	Ferrari 500	Ferrari 500 2.0 L4	SUI; Ret	500	BEL; Ret	FRA; Ret	GBR; DNA	GER	NED	ITA; 10		NC	0
1953	Ecurie Rosier	Ferrari 500	Ferrari 500 2.0 L4	ARG	500	NED; 7	BEL; 8	FRA; 8	GBR; 10	GER; 10	SUI; Ret	ITA; 16	NC	0
1954	Ecurie Rosier	Ferrari 500/625	Ferrari 625 2.5 L4	ARG; Ret	500	BEL	FRA; Ret	GBR; Ret	GER; 8	SUI			NC	0
1954	Officine Alfieri Maserati	Maserati 250F	Maserati 250F1 2.5 L6								ITA; 8		NC	0
1954	Ecurie Rosier	Maserati 250F	Maserati 250F1 2.5 L6									ESP; 7	NC	0
1955	Ecurie Rosier	Maserati 250F	Maserati 250F1 2.5 L6	ARG	MON; Ret	500	BEL; 9	NED; 9	GBR	ITA			NC	0
1956	Ecurie Rosier	Maserati 250F	Maserati 250F1 2.5 L6	ARG	MON; Ret	500	BEL; 8	FRA; 6	GBR; Ret	GER; 5	ITA		19th	2

Notes

- **^1** – Shared drive with Charles Pozzi

=== Complete Formula One non-championship results ===
(key) (Races in bold indicate pole position; Races in italics indicate fastest lap)

Year	Entrant	Chassis	Engine	1	2	3	4	5	6	7	8	9	10	11	12	13	14	15	16	17	18	19	20	21	22	23	24	25	26	27	28	29	30	31	32	33	34
1950	Ecurie Rosier	Talbot-Lago T26C	Talbot 23CV 4.5 L6	PAU; 3	RIC	SRM	PAR; Ret	EMP	BAR; DNA	JER	ALB; 1	NED; 1	NAT; DNA	NOT	ULS	PES; 2	STT	INT	GOO	PEN; Ret																	
1951	Ecurie Rosier	Talbot-Lago T26C	Talbot 23CV 4.5 L6	SYR; 5	PAU; 2	RIC	SRM; Ret	**BOR**; 1	INT; 5	PAR; 3	ULS; 7	SCO	NED; 1	ALB; 2	PES; 2	BAR; 4	GOO																				
1952	Ecurie Rosier	Ferrari 500	Ferrari 500 2.0 L4	SYR	VAL	RIC	LAV	PAU; 2	IBS	MAR; Ret	AST	INT	ELÄ	NAP; NC	EIF	PAR; 3				MNZ	LAC	ESS	MAR; 5	SAB	CAE; 3		COM; Ret	NAT	BAU; 3	MOD	**CAD**; 1	SKA	MAD	AVU	JOE	NEW	
1952	Ecurie Rosier	Ferrari 375	Ferrari 375 4.5 V12														ALB; 1	FRO	ULS; 4							DMT; 5											
1953	Ecurie Rosier	Ferrari 500	Ferrari 500 2.0 L4	SYR	PAU; 5	LAV	AST	BOR; Ret	INT; 10	ELÄ	NAP; 5	ULS	WIN	FRO	COR	EIF									LAC; 2	BRI	CHE	SAB; 1	NEW	CAD; 4	RED	SKA	LON	MOD	MAD	JOE	CUR
1953	Ecurie Rosier	Ferrari 375	Ferrari 375 4.5 V12														ALB; 1	PRI	ESS	MID	ROU; 7	CRY	AVU	USF													
1954	Ecurie Rosier	Ferrari 625	Ferrari 2.5 L4	SYR	PAU; 6	LAV	BOR; Ret	INT; 6	BAR; Ret	CUR	ROM; 5	FRO	COR	BRC	CRY	ROU; 8	CAE; 5	AUG	COR	OUL	RED	PES; Ret	JOE	CAD; 3	BER; Ret												
1954	Ecurie Rosier	Maserati 250F	Maserati 250F1 2.5 L6																							GOO; 7	DTT; 6										
1955	Ecurie Rosier	Maserati 250F	Maserati 250F1 2.5 L6	VAL; 6	PAU; 7	GLO	BOR; Ret	INT; 5	NAP	ALB; 2	CUR	COR	LON	DRT; 3	RED; 7	DTT; Ret	OUL	AVO; Ret	SYR; Ret																		
1956	Ecurie Rosier	Maserati 250F	Maserati 250F1 2.5 L6	BUE	GLV; 7	SYR	AIN; 4	INT; 6	NAP	100	VNW	CAE; Ret	BRH																								

=== Complete 24 Hours of Le Mans results ===
Year	Team	Co-Drivers	Car	Class	Laps	Pos.	Class Pos.
1938	(Italy) Luigi Chinetti	(France) Robert Huguet	Talbot T150SS Coupe	5.0	81	DNF	
1949	(France) Ecurie Rosier	(France) Jean-Louis Rosier	Talbot-Lago Spéciale	S5.0	21	DNF (Fanbelt)	
1950	(France) Louis Rosier (private entrant)	(France) Jean-Louis Rosier	Talbot-Lago T26 GS Biplace	S5.0	256	**1st**	**1st**
1951	(France) Louis Rosier (private entrant)	(Argentina) Juan Manuel Fangio	Talbot-Lago T26 GS Biplace	S5.0	92	DNF (Oil tank)	
1952	(France) Ecurie Rosier	(France) Maurice Trintignant	Ferrari 340 America Spyder	S5.0	?	DNF (Clutch)	
1953	(France) Automobiles Talbot-Darracq S.A.	(France) Élie Bayol	Talbot-Lago T26 GS Spyder	S5.0	37	DNF (Transmission)	
1954	(Italy) Scuderia Ferrari	(France) Robert Manzon	Ferrari 375 Plus	S5.0	177	DNF (Transmission)	
1955	(France) Ecurie Rosier	(France) Georges Grignard	Talbot-Lago T26 GS Spyder	S5.0		DNS (Engine)	
1956	(France) Automobiles Talbot	(France) Jean Behra	Talbot-Lago Sport	S3.0	220	DNF (Transmission)	

Sporting positions
Preceded by Luigi Chinetti; Peter Mitchell-Thomson	Winner of the 24 Hours of Le Mans; 1950; With: Jean-Louis Rosier	Succeeded by Peter Walker; Peter Whitehead
