= Circuit Les Planques =

Motor racing road circuit in France

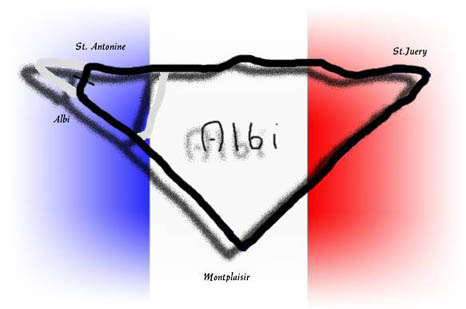
- Layout of the Circuit Les Planques (1934–1953)
- Location: Albi, Tarn, Occitanie, France
- Coordinates: 43°55′53.96″N 2°10′16.13″E
- Opened: 1933
- Closed: 1955
- Former names: Circuit Automobile d'Albi (1933–1953)
- Major events: French motorcycle Grand Prix (1951); Albi Grand Prix (1933–1939, 1946–1955)

Circuit Raymond Sommer (1954–1955)
- Length: 2.991 km (1.859 mi)
- Turns: 6
- Race lap record: 1:17.100 ( (France) André Simon, Maserati 250F, 1955, F1)

Grand Prix Circuit (1934–1953)
- Length: 8.911 km (5.537 mi)
- Turns: 11
- Race lap record: 2:52.000 ( (United Kingdom) Ken Wharton, BRM Type 15, 1953, F1)

Original Grand Prix Circuit (1933)
- Length: 9.226 km (5.733 mi)
- Turns: 10
- Race lap record: 3:44.000 ( (United Kingdom) Whitney Straight, Maserati Tipo 26M, 1933, GP)

Circuit Les Planques was a 9.226 km (5.733 mi) long motor racing road circuit in a triangular shape, located near Albi. The circuit was later shortened to 8.911 km (5.537 mi) in 1934, and again to 2.991 km (1.859 mi) in 1954.

== History ==
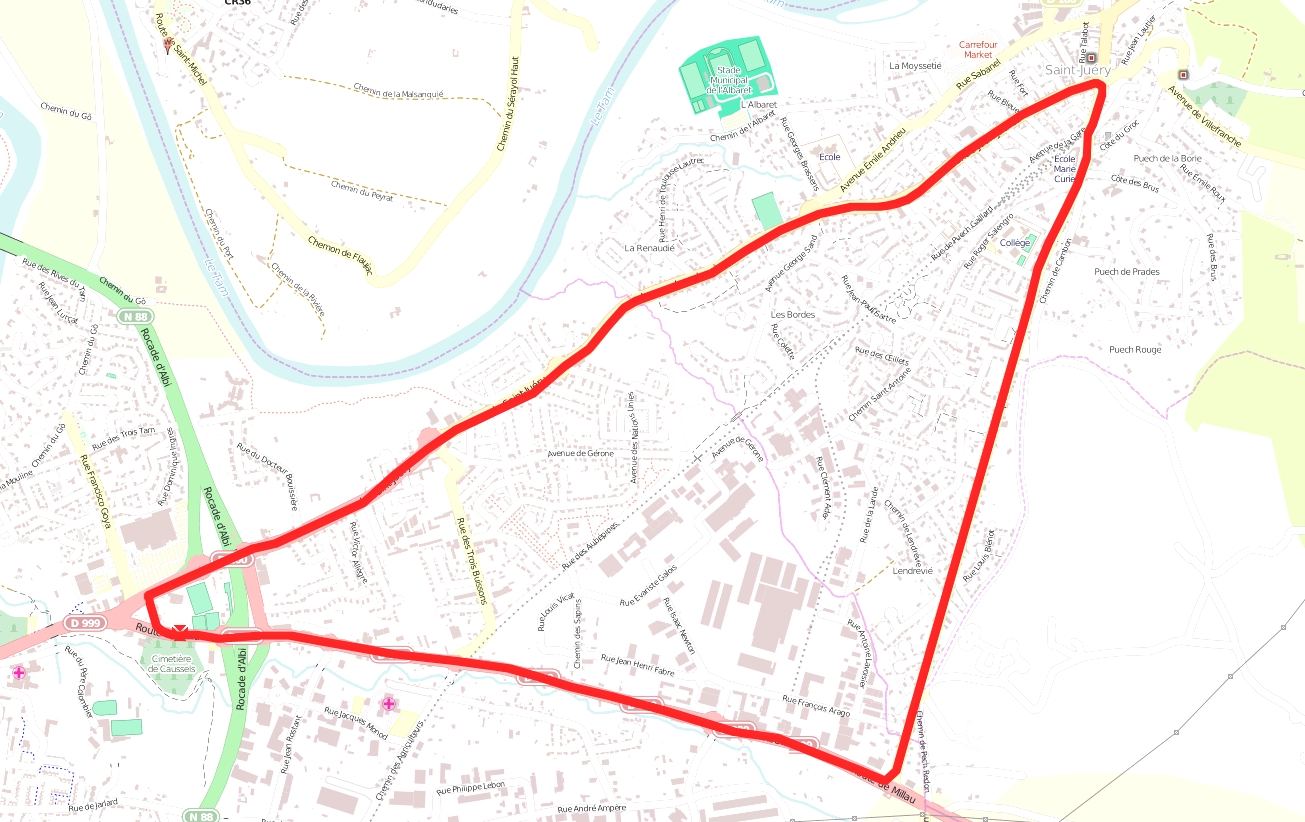
Map of the route of the Albi des Planques circuit, as it was in 1933

Built in 1933 by a group of enthusiasts, the circuit of Albi les Planques quickly became a classic in the racing specialty of cars. This event was run on a bumpy and narrow road.

After the war, from 1946, the Albi Grand Prix continued to be a non-championship Formula One motor race.

Dario Ambrosini died in the 1951 French motorcycle Grand Prix.

In 1954, the circuit was renamed Circuit Raymond Sommer in homage to the driver who died in 1950 and had enchanted the Albigensians in 1947 in Formula Two.

After the 1955 Le Mans disaster, the track was officially closed as deemed too dangerous. Motor racing was transferred in 1959 to the new purpose-built Circuit d'Albi west of the city, first for Formula Two and then Formula Three.

== Description ==
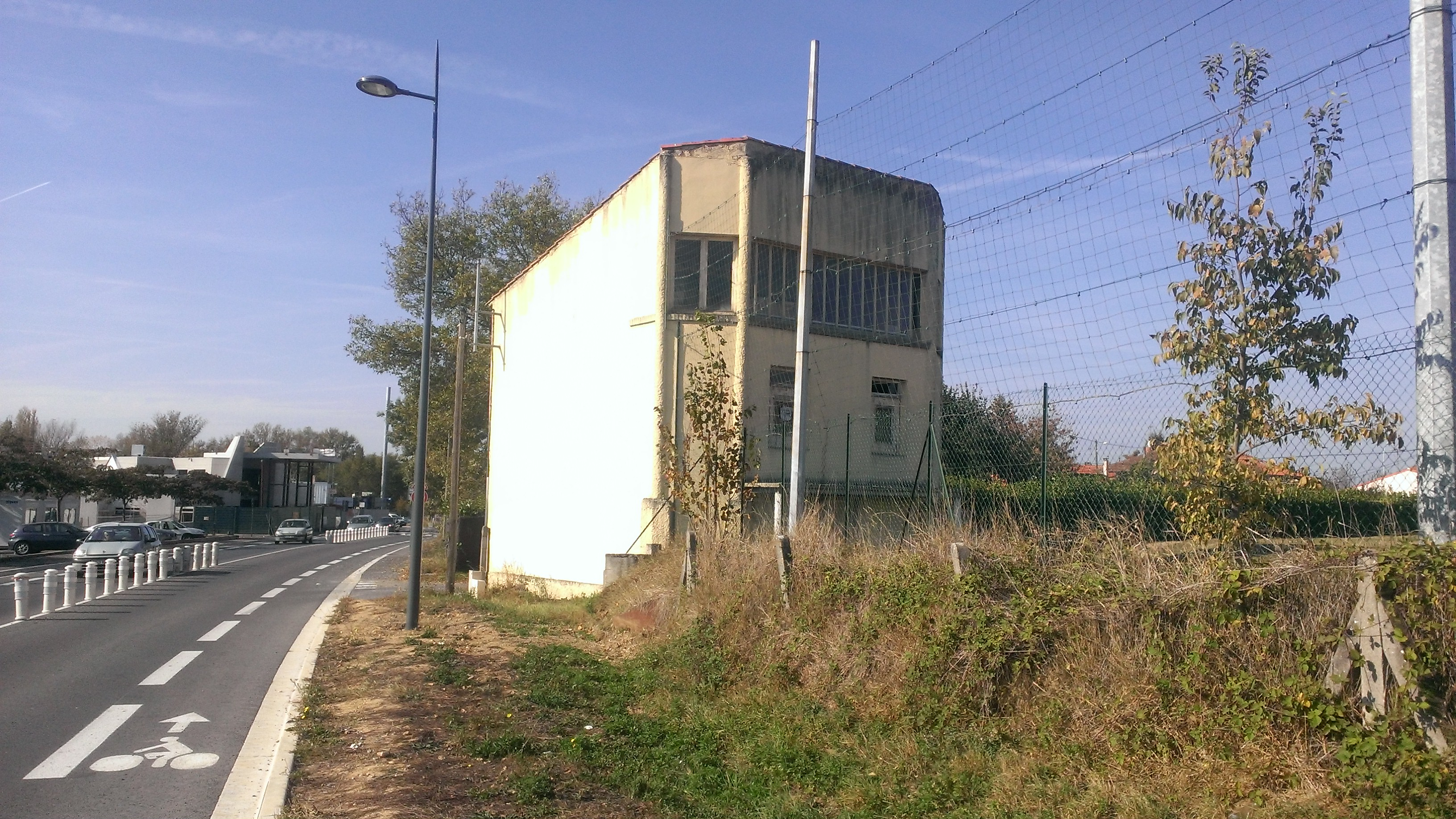
The original timing tower, as it is today.

The start was given on the shorter side of the triangle, in the hamlet of Les planques, near Albi; after a right turn, the circuit winded up to Saint-Antoine and climbed to the village of Saint-Juéry where a hairpin turned the track south and then crossed a railway line followed by a bump. A long straight, Montplaisir, followed by another, the current Route de Millau, led back to the starting line.

In 1934, the first modification was made. To remove the hairpin at the Planques, a 225 m (738 ft) ramp was drawn along the edge which was built, by volunteers, stood on either side as well as a passage under the track which led the riders to their pits. The starting line was permanently fixed there. At the end of the grandstand (south of the starting line) was built the timing tower, the only vestige still in place from that time. This new structure allowed the homologation for the registration of the circuit on the international calendar.

The circuit was shortened in 1954 to only 2.991 km (1.859 mi) and was called the Raymond Sommer circuit. No more races crossed Saint-Juéry.

== Lap records ==
The fastest official race lap records at the Circuit Les Planques are listed as:

Category	Time	Driver	Vehicle	Event
Circuit Raymond Sommer (1954–1955): 2.991 km (1.859 mi)
Formula One	1:17.100	André Simon	Maserati 250F	1955 Albi Grand Prix
Grand Prix Circuit (1934–1953): 8.911 km (5.537 mi)
Formula One	2:52.000	Ken Wharton	BRM Type 15	1953 Albi Grand Prix
GP	3:10.100	Luigi Villoresi	Maserati 4CLT/48	1948 Albi Grand Prix
Formula Two	3:14.300	Roberto Mieres	Gordini T16	1953 Albi Grand Prix
500cc	3.17.300	Alfredo Milani	Gilera 500 Rondine	1951 French motorcycle Grand Prix
Voiturette	3:20.000	Arthur Dobson	ERA E-Type	1939 Albi Grand Prix
350cc	3.38.000	Bill Doran	AJS 7R	1951 French motorcycle Grand Prix
250cc	3.40.800	Bruno Ruffo	Moto Guzzi 250	1951 French motorcycle Grand Prix
Sidecar	3:59.100	Eric Oliver (Note: Both riders took the same lap time in the same race independently.); Ercole Frigerio	Norton Sidecar; Gilera Sidecar	1951 French motorcycle Grand Prix
Original Grand Prix Circuit (1933): 9.226 km (5.733 mi)
GP	3:44.000	Whitney Straight	Maserati Tipo 26M	1933 Albi Grand Prix
Voiturette	4:16.000	Pierre Veyron	Bugatti Type 51A	1933 Albi Grand Prix

== See also ==
- Circuit d'Albi
