= Écurie Rosier =

- Full name: (France) Écurie Rosier; Équipe Rosier
- Base: France
- Founder(s): Louis Rosier
- Noted staff: Louis Rosier
- Noted drivers: (France) Louis Rosier (France) Henri Louveau (Monaco) Louis Chiron (France) Maurice Trintignant (France) Robert Manzon

Formula One World Championship career
- First entry: 1950 Monaco Grand Prix
- Races entered: 34
- Constructors: Talbot-Lago; Ferrari; Maserati
- Engines: Talbot; Ferrari; Maserati
- Drivers' Championships: 0
- Race victories: 0
- Pole positions: 0
- Fastest laps: 0
- Final entry: 1956 German Grand Prix

Écurie Rosier and Équipe Rosier were names used by French racing driver Louis Rosier to enter his own cars in Formula One between 1950 and his death in 1956. Commonly the vehicles were entered for Rosier himself, but he also provided cars for a number of other drivers during the period. Between 1950 and 1957 Ecurie Rosier collected a total fifteen World Championship points and one podium finish.

== Formula One ==
Louis Rosier began entering cars in Formula One under his own name in 1950, first with a Talbot-Lago T26C with some success, recording two points-scoring finishes from his nine World Championship entries in 1950 and 1951. He also entered cars for Henri Louveau and Louis Chiron during these seasons.

In 1952 Rosier started racing Ferraris, recording only one non-points scoring finish from his four World Championship entries. 1953 was a better season for Rosier, finishing in the top ten five times from his seven entries, but failing to score any points. 1954 was the best season for Ecurie Rosier, with fellow Frenchman Maurice Trintignant finishing fourth in Argentina and Robert Manzon finishing a strong third at the team's home Grand Prix.

For the 1954 Spanish Grand Prix Rosier entered the new Maserati 250F, and finished in seventh position. In 1955 Rosier returned to entering only a single car for himself. He retired in Monaco and finished ninth in both Belgium and the Netherlands. For 1956 Rosier again entered the Maserati. He started the season with a retirement at Monaco before finishing eighth in Belgium and sixth in France. After starting twenty-seventh in Britain, Rosier retired on lap twenty-three when his electrics failed. The 1956 German Grand Prix, where Rosier finished a strong fifth, proved to be the last Grand Prix of Écurie Rosier because Louis Rosier died of injuries he sustained in a crash at the Montlhéry track, south of Paris, France, on 7 October 1956.

== Complete Formula One results ==
(key) (results in bold indicate pole position; results in italics indicate fastest lap)

Year	Chassis	Engine	Tyres	Driver	1	2	3	4	5	6	7	8	9
1950	Talbot-Lago T26C	Talbot 23CV 4.5 L6	**D**		GBR	MON	500	SUI	BEL	FRA	ITA		
1950	Talbot-Lago T26C	Talbot 23CV 4.5 L6	**D**	(France) Louis Rosier		Ret					4		
1950	Talbot-Lago T26C	Talbot 23CV 4.5 L6	**D**	(France) Henri Louveau							Ret		
1951	Talbot-Lago T26C	Talbot 23CV 4.5 L6	**D**		SUI	500	BEL	FRA	GBR	GER	ITA	ESP	
1951	Talbot-Lago T26C	Talbot 23CV 4.5 L6	**D**	(France) Louis Rosier	9		4	Ret	10	8	7	7	
1951	Talbot-Lago T26C	Talbot 23CV 4.5 L6	**D**	(France) Henri Louveau	Ret								
1951	Talbot-Lago T26C	Talbot 23CV 4.5 L6	**D**	(Monaco) Louis Chiron			Ret	6	Ret	Ret	Ret	Ret	
1952	Ferrari 500	Ferrari 500 2.0 L4	**D**		SUI	500	BEL	FRA	GBR	GER	NED	ITA	
1952	Ferrari 500	Ferrari 500 2.0 L4	**D**	(France) Louis Rosier	Ret		Ret	Ret				10	
1953	Ferrari 500	Ferrari 500 2.0 L4	**D** **E**		ARG	500	NED	BEL	FRA	GBR	GER	SUI	ITA
1953	Ferrari 500	Ferrari 500 2.0 L4	**D** **E**	(France) Louis Rosier			7	8	8	10	10	Ret	16
1954	Ferrari 500; Ferrari 625; Maserati 250F	Ferrari 500 2.0 L4; Ferrari 625 2.5 L4; Maserati 250F1 2.5 L6	**D** **P**		ARG	500	BEL	FRA	GBR	GER	SUI	ITA	ESP
1954	Ferrari 500; Ferrari 625; Maserati 250F	Ferrari 500 2.0 L4; Ferrari 625 2.5 L4; Maserati 250F1 2.5 L6	**D** **P**	(France) Louis Rosier	Ret			Ret	Ret	8			7
1954	Ferrari 500; Ferrari 625; Maserati 250F	Ferrari 500 2.0 L4; Ferrari 625 2.5 L4; Maserati 250F1 2.5 L6	**D** **P**	(France) Maurice Trintignant	4								
1954	Ferrari 500; Ferrari 625; Maserati 250F	Ferrari 500 2.0 L4; Ferrari 625 2.5 L4; Maserati 250F1 2.5 L6	**D** **P**	(France) Robert Manzon				3	Ret	9		Ret	Ret
1955	Maserati 250F	Maserati 250F1 2.5 L6	**P**		ARG	MON	500	BEL	NED	GBR	ITA		
1955	Maserati 250F	Maserati 250F1 2.5 L6	**P**	(France) Louis Rosier		Ret		9	9				
1956	Maserati 250F	Maserati 250F1 2.5 L6	**P**		ARG	MON	500	BEL	FRA	GBR	GER	ITA	
1956	Maserati 250F	Maserati 250F1 2.5 L6	**P**	(France) Louis Rosier		Ret		8	6	Ret	5		
