= 1949 Albi Grand Prix =

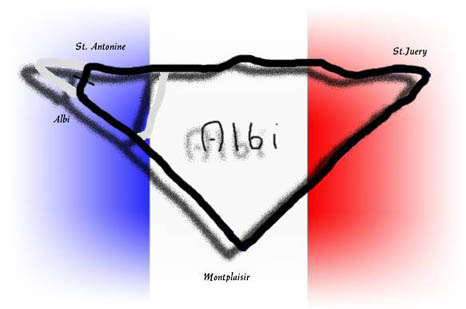
- Circuit Les Planques

Race details
- Date: 10 July 1949
- Official name: XI Grand Prix de l'Albigeois
- Location: Albi, France
- Course: Circuit Les Planques
- Course length: 8.880 km (5.518 mi)
- Distance: 34 laps, 301.94 km (187.62 mi)

Pole position
Driver	(Argentina) Juan Manuel Fangio	Maserati
- Grid positions set by heat results

Fastest lap
Driver	(Argentina) Juan Manuel Fangio	Maserati
- Time: 3:14.4

Podium
First	(Argentina) Juan Manuel Fangio	Maserati
Second	(Thailand) B. Bira	Maserati
Third	(France) Louis Rosier	Talbot-Lago

The 11th Grand Prix de l'Albigeois was a Formula One motor race held on 10 July 1949. The race was preceded by a 5 lap heat, which determined the grid positions for the 34 lap final.

The winner was Juan Manuel Fangio in a Maserati 4CLT; he also won the heat and set fastest lap. B. Bira finished second in another 4CLT and Louis Rosier came in third in a Talbot-Lago T26C.

== Results ==
=== Heat ===
Pos.	No.	Driver	Entrant	Car	Time
1	8	(Argentina) Juan Manuel Fangio	Automóvil Club Argentino	Maserati 4CLT/48	16:20.4, 163.13kph
2	12	(Italy) Giuseppe Farina	G. Farina	Maserati 4CLT/48	+24.4s
3	6	(France) Louis Rosier	Ecurie Rosier	Talbot-Lago T26C	+29.2s
4	16	(Switzerland) Emmanuel de Graffenried	Enrico Platé	Maserati 4CLT/48	+30.0s
5	10	(Argentina) Benedicto Campos	Automóvil Club Argentino	Maserati 4CLT/48	+48.9s
6	28	(France) Guy Mairesse	Ecurie France	Talbot-Lago T26C	+1:40.4
7	18	(Belgium) Johnny Claes	Ecurie Belge	Talbot-Lago T26C	+1:41.5
8	40	(United States) Harry Schell	Horschell Racing Corporation	Talbot-Lago T26C	+2:18.8
9	26	(United Kingdom) Leslie Brooke	H. L. Brooke	Maserati 4CLT/48	+2:22.8
10	44	(France) "Raph"	Ecurie Mundia Course	Delahaye 135	
11	2	(France) Raymond Sommer	R. Sommer	Talbot-Lago T26C	
12	32	(United Kingdom) David Murray	D. Murray	Maserati 4CL	
13	30	(United Kingdom) David Hampshire	D.A. Hampshire	ERA B-Type	
Ret.	20	(United Kingdom) Reg Parnell	R. Parnell	Maserati 4CLT/48	5 laps, valves
Ret.	14	(Thailand) B. Bira	Enrico Platé	Maserati 4CLT/48	4 laps, supercharger
Ret.	22	(United Kingdom) Fred Ashmore	R. Parnell	Maserati 4CLT/48	1 lap, oil pressure
DNA	4	(France) Philippe Étancelin	P. Étancelin	Talbot-Lago T26C	
DNA	24	(Monaco) Louis Chiron	Ecurie France	Talbot-Lago T26C	
DNA	34	(France) Jean Behra	Ecurie Dimiex	Maserati 6C-34	
DNA	36	(France) Georges Houel	Ecurie Dimiex	Maserati 4CL	
DNA	38	(France) Georges Grignard	G. Grignard	Talbot-Lago T26C	
DNA	42	(France) Eugène Chaboud	Ecurie Dimiex	Maserati 4CL	

=== Final ===
Pos.	No.	Driver	Entrant	Car	Time
1	8	(Argentina) Juan Manuel Fangio	Automóvil Club Argentino	Maserati 4CLT/48	1:54:38.6, 158.02kph
2	14	(Thailand) B. Bira	Enrico Platé	Maserati 4CLT/48	+2:39.0
3	6	(France) Louis Rosier	Ecurie Rosier	Talbot-Lago T26C	+1 lap
4	16	(Switzerland) Emmanuel de Graffenried	Enrico Platé	Maserati 4CLT/48	+1 lap
5	28	(France) Guy Mairesse	Ecurie France	Talbot-Lago T26C	+2 laps
6	2	(France) Raymond Sommer	R. Sommer	Talbot-Lago T26C	+3 laps
7	26	(United Kingdom) Leslie Brooke	H.L. Brooke	Maserati 4CLT/48	+3 laps
12	32	(United Kingdom) David Murray	D. Murray	Maserati 4CL	+4 laps
9	44	(France) "Raph"	Ecurie Mundia Course	Delahaye 135	+6 laps
Ret.	12	(Italy) Giuseppe Farina	G. Farina	Maserati 4CLT/48	16 laps, starter motor
Ret.	10	(Argentina) Benedicto Campos	Automóvil Club Argentino	Maserati 4CLT/48	15 laps, accident
Ret.	22	(United Kingdom) Fred Ashmore	R. Parnell	Maserati 4CLT/48	6 laps, piston
Ret.	40	(United States) Harry Schell	Horschell Racing Corporation	Talbot-Lago T26C	4 laps, oil pressure
Ret.	30	(United Kingdom) David Hampshire	D.A. Hampshire	ERA B-Type	2 laps, oil pressure
Ret.	20	(United Kingdom) Reg Parnell	R. Parnell	Maserati 4CLT/48	2 laps, valves
Ret.	18	(Belgium) Johnny Claes	Ecurie Belge	Talbot-Lago T26C	2 laps, camshaft

Grand Prix Race
Previous race: 1949 Grand Prix des Frontières	1949 Grand Prix season Grandes Épreuves	Next race: 1949 Zandvoort Grand Prix
Previous race: 1948 Albi Grand Prix	Albi Grand Prix	Next race: 1950 Albi Grand Prix
