= 1948 Paris Grand Prix =

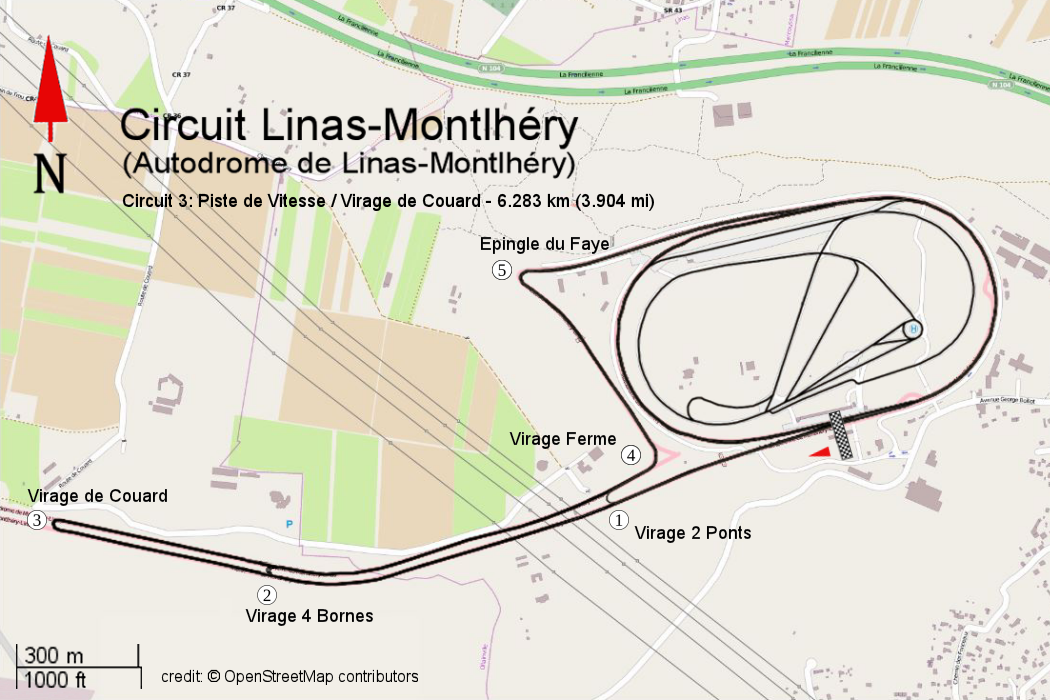

Race details
- Date: 30 May 1948
- Official name: II Grand Prix de Paris
- Location: Montlhéry, Paris
- Course: Permanent racing facility
- Course length: 6.30 km (3.91 mi)
- Distance: 50 laps, 314.99 km (195.73 mi)

Fastest lap
Driver	(France) Yves Giraud-Cabantous	Talbot-Lago
- Time: 2:29.8

Podium
First	(France) Yves Giraud-Cabantous	Talbot-Lago
Second	(Monaco) Louis Chiron	Talbot-Lago
Third	(France) Eugene Chaboud	Delahaye

The 2nd Grand Prix de Paris was a Formula One motor race held on 30 May 1948 at the Autodrome de Linas-Montlhéry, in Montlhéry near Paris.

The 50-lap race was won by Talbot-Lago driver Yves Giraud-Cabantous, who also set fastest lap. Louis Chiron drove another Talbot-Lago for second place and Eugene Chaboud was third in a Delahaye.

== Results ==
Pos	No.	Driver	Entrant	Constructor	Time/Retired
1	4	(France) Yves Giraud-Cabantous	Ecurie France	Talbot-Lago T26C	2:08:52.2, 132.45kph
2	2	(Monaco) Louis Chiron	Ecurie France	Talbot-Lago T26C	+2:00.0
3	14	(France) Eugene Chaboud	Ecurie Lutetia	Delahaye 135S	+3 laps
4	30	(France) Guy Mairesse	Guy Mairesse	Delahaye 135S	+3 laps
5	6	(France) Charles Huc (France) Louis Rosier	Ecurie Rosier	Talbot-Lago T150C	+4 laps
6	52	(United Kingdom) Pat Garland	Pat Garland	Delage 3000	+5 laps
7	32	(France) Charles de Cortanze	Émile Darl'mat	Darl'mat-Peugeot	+5 laps
8	10	(France) Joseph Chotard	Philippe Étancelin	Talbot-Lago T26C	+6 laps
9	28	(France) Roger Loyer	Ecurie Paris	Cisitalia D46-Fiat	+6 laps
10	22	(France) Pierre Meyrat	Pierre Meyrat	Delahaye 135S	+6 laps
11	18	(France) Pierre Flahault (France) Charles Pozzi	Pierre Flahault	Delahaye 135S	+8 laps
12	34	(France) Marc Versini	Marc Versini	Delage 3000	+12 laps
Ret	8	(France) Louis Rosier	Ecurie Rosier	Talbot-Lago T26C	
Ret	12	(France) Georges Grignard	Charles Huc	Talbot-Lago T150SS	
Ret	16	(France) Charles Pozzi	Ecurie Lutetia	Talbot-Lago T26SS	Valve
Ret	20	(France) Henri Trillaud	Henri Trillaud	Delahaye 135S	Gasket
Ret	24	(France) Jean Brault	Jean Brault	Delahaye 135S	
Ret	26	(France) Eugene Martin	Eugene Martin	BMW 328	Gasket
Ret	40	(France) Henri Louveau	Scuderia Milano	Maserati 4CL	
Ret	46	(France) Jean Judet	Jean Judet	Maserati 4CL	Con rod
Ret	50	(France) Auguste Veuillet	Auguste Veuillet	Delage 3000	
Ret	54	(France) Edmond Mouche	Edmond Mouche	Delage 3000	
Ret	56	(France) René Bonnet	Deutsch et Bonnet	DB-Panhard	Radius rod
DNS	36	(France) Maurice Trintignant	Equipe Gordini	Simca Gordini Type 15	Tyre
DNS	38	(France) Igor Troubetzkoy	Equipe Gordini	Simca Gordini Type 15	Tyre
DNA	48	(France) Louis Gerard	Louis Gerard	Maserati 8CM	

Previous race: 1948 British Empire Trophy	Formula One non-championship races 1948 season	Next race: 1948 Stockholm Grand Prix
Previous race: 1947 Paris Grand Prix	Paris Grand Prix	Next race: 1949 Paris Grand Prix
