= 1949 Formula One Grand Prix des Frontières =

1949 Frontières Grand Prix
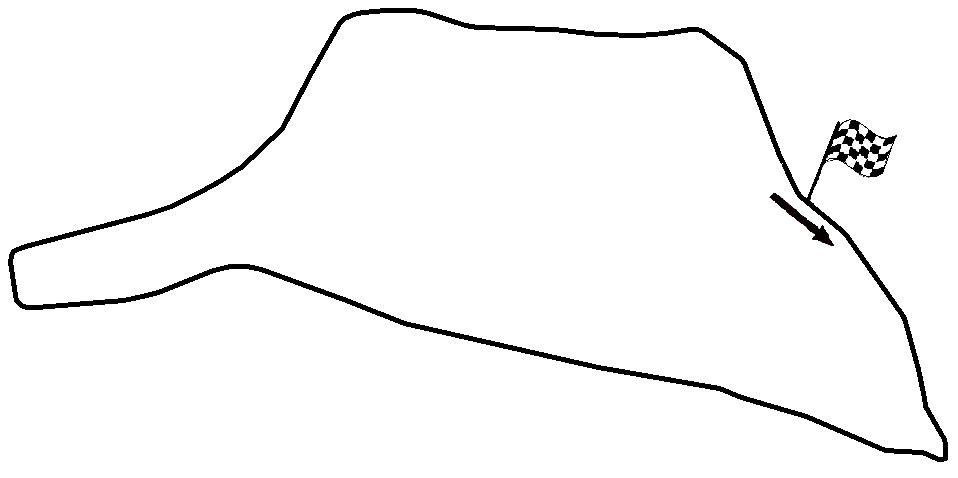

Race details
- Date: 5 June 1949
- Official name: XVIII Grand Prix des Frontières
- Location: Chimay, Belgium
- Course: Temporary street circuit
- Course length: 10.87 km (6.75 mi)
- Distance: 15 laps, 163.04 km (101.31 mi)

Fastest lap
| Driver | (France) Guy Mairesse | Talbot-Lago |
- Time: 4:32.6

Podium
| First | (France) Guy Mairesse | Talbot-Lago |
| Second | (United Kingdom) Lance Macklin | Maserati |
| Third | (Belgium) Johnny Claes | Talbot-Lago |

The 18th Grand Prix des Frontières was a Formula One motor race held on 5 June 1949 at the Chimay Street Circuit in Chimay, Belgium. The Grand Prix was won by Guy Mairesse in a Talbot-Lago T26C, setting fastest lap also. Lance Macklin finished second in a Maserati 6CM and Johnny Claes was third in another T26C.

== Classification ==
=== Race ===
| Pos | No | Driver | Entrant | Car | Time/Retired |
|---|---|---|---|---|---|
| 1 | 22 | (France) Guy Mairesse | Ecurie France | Talbot-Lago T26C | 1:10:10.0, 138.95 kph |
| 2 | 12 | (United Kingdom) Lance Macklin | L. Macklin | Maserati 6CM | +3:37.0 |
| 3 | 4 | (Belgium) Johnny Claes | Ecurie Belge | Talbot-Lago T26C | +4:38.0 |
| 4 | 14 | (France) Pierre Meyrat | Ecurie Letitia | Talbot Spéciale | +4:38.2 |
| 5 | 37 | (France) "Raph" | Ecurie Mundia Course | Delahaye 135 | +2 laps |
| Ret. | 16 | (France) Charles Pozzi | Ecurie Letitia | Talbot Spéciale | 6 laps |
| Ret. | 2 | (France) Havaux | Havaux | Bugatti Type 49B | 2 laps |
| DNS | 8 | (Belgium) Arthur Legat | A. Legat | Maserati 6CM | |
| DNS | 30 | (Belgium) Paul Demesse | A. Legat | Bugatti Type 37A | |
| DNA | 6 | (United Kingdom) Horace Ripley | H.J. Ripley | Talbot | Driver ill |
| DNA | 18 | (France) Alexandre Constantin | A. Constantin | Maserati 8C | |
| DNA | 20 | (United Kingdom) Pat Garland | P.A.T. Garland | Talbot-Lago T26C | |
| DNA | 24 | (France) Louis Rosier | Ecurie Rosier | Talbot-Lago T26C | |
| DNA | 26 | (France) Henri Louveau | Ecurie Rosier | Talbot Spéciale | |
| DNA | 29 | (United States) Alexander Orley | A. Orley | Veritas-BMW 328 | |

Grand Prix Race
| Previous race: 1949 British Empire Trophy | 1949 Grand Prix season Grandes Épreuves | Next race: 1949 Albi Grand Prix |
| Previous race: 1948 Grand Prix des Frontières | Grand Prix des Frontières | Next race: 1950 Grand Prix des Frontières |
