= Grand Prix des Frontières =

- Chimay Street Circuit
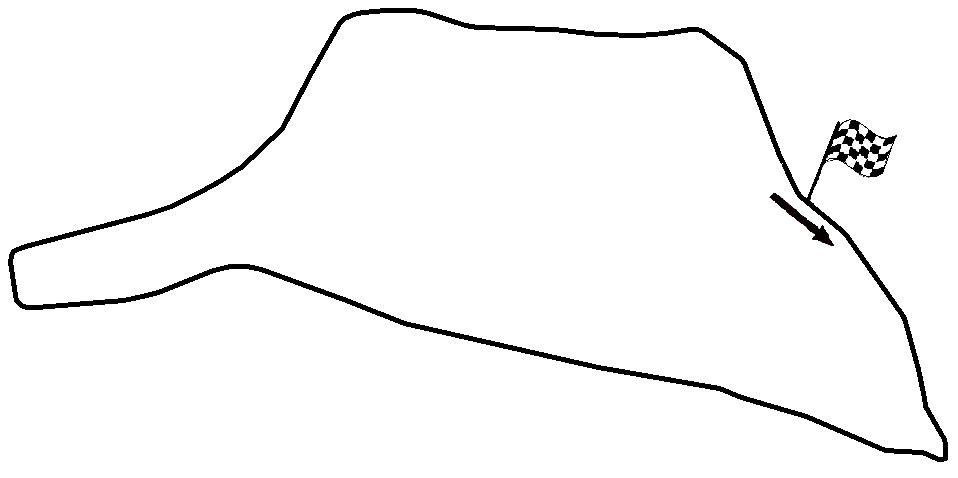

Race information
- Number of times held: 38
- First held: 1926
- Last held: 1972
- Most wins (drivers): (Belgium) Arthur Legat (3) (France) Maurice Trintignant (3) (United Kingdom) David Purley (3)
- Most wins (constructors): (France) Bugatti (7)
- Circuit length: 10.45 km (6.49 miles)
- Race length: 125.4 km (77.89 miles)
- Laps: 12

Last race (1972)

Pole position
- (United Kingdom) Andy Sutcliffe; GRD-Ford

Podium
- 1. (United Kingdom) David Purley; Ensign-Ford; 2. (France) Pierre-Francois Rousselot; GRD-Ford; 3. (France) Christian Éthuin; Narval-Ford

Fastest lap
- (United Kingdom) David Purley (France) Pierre-Francois Rousselot; Ensign-Ford GRD-Ford

The Grand Prix des Frontières was a motor race held at a street circuit in Chimay, Belgium. The race was created by Jules Buisseret, who was also responsible for the circuit's existence. The first event was held in 1926 and was discontinued after the 1972 event for safety reasons.

Since the 1980s, races for classic motorcycles have been run on a reduced version of the Chimay road circuit under the banner of the Grand Prix des Frontières. The full circuit was used for the 2008 anniversary races, but since that year the full circuit has been reserved for special occasions, with the regular annual events using the shorter course.

== Winners of the Grand Prix des Frontières ==
=== Multiple winners ===
# Wins	Driver	Years won
3	(Belgium) Arthur Legat	1931, 1932, 1933
3	(France) Maurice Trintignant	1938, 1939, 1953
3	(United Kingdom) David Purley	1970, 1971, 1972
2	(Thailand) Prince Bira	1947, 1954
2	(France) Guy Mairesse	1948, 1949 (F1)
2	(Belgium) Johnny Claes	1950, 1951
2	(Switzerland) Benoit Musy	1955, 1956
2	(United Kingdom) Peter Westbury	1967, 1968

=== By year ===
Year	Driver	Car	Rules	Report
1926	(Belgium) Roger Pierard	Salmson GS	Cyclecar	Report
1927	(France) Guy d'Havrincourt	Salmson GP	Cyclecar	Report
1928	(France) Yves Giraud-Cabantous	Salmson GS	Voiturette	Report
1929	(Italy) Goffredo Zehender	Alfa Romeo 6C 1750	Formula Libre	Report
1930	(France) Georges de Marotte	Salmson GP	Grand Prix	Report
1931	(Belgium) Arthur Legat	Bugatti Type 37A	Formula Libre	Report
1932	(Belgium) Arthur Legat	Bugatti Type 37A	Voiturette	Report
1933	(Belgium) Arthur Legat	Bugatti Type 37A	Voiturette	Report
1934	(Belgium) Willy Longueville	Bugatti Type 35B	Voiturette	Report
1935	(Germany) Rudolf Steinweg	Bugatti Type 51A	Grand Prix	Report
1936	(Netherlands) Eddie Hertzberger	MG Magnette K3	Sports car	Report
1937	(Switzerland) Hans Rüesch	Alfa Romeo 8C-35	Formula Libre	Report
1938	(France) Maurice Trintignant	Bugatti Type 51	Formula Libre	Report
1939	(France) Maurice Trintignant	Bugatti Type 51	Grand Prix	Report
1940– 1945	Not held			
1946	(United Kingdom) Leslie Brooke	ERA B	Formula Libre	Report
1947	(Thailand) Prince Bira	Maserati 4CL	Formula Libre	Report
1948	(France) Guy Mairesse	Delahaye 135	Formula Libre	Report
1949	(France) Guy Mairesse	Talbot-Lago T26C	Formula One	Report
1949	(France) Émile Cornet	Veritas RS-BMW	Formula Two	Report
1950	(Belgium) Johnny Claes	HWM-Alta	Formula Two	Report
1951	(Belgium) Johnny Claes	Simca-Gordini T11	Formula Two	Report
1952	(Belgium) Paul Frère	HWM-Alta	Formula Two	Report
1953	(France) Maurice Trintignant	Simca-Gordini T16	Formula Two	Report
1954	(Thailand) Prince Bira	Maserati 250F	Formula One	Report
1955	(Switzerland) Benoît Musy	Maserati A6GCS	Sports car	Report
1956	(Switzerland) Benoît Musy	Maserati 300S	Sports car	Report
1957	(Italy) Franco Bordoni	Maserati 200SI	Sports car	Report
1958	(United Kingdom) Brian Naylor	JBW-Maserati	Sports car	Report
1959	(United Kingdom) Mike Taylor	Lotus 15-Climax	Sports car	Report
1960	(United Kingdom) Jack Lewis	Cooper T45-Climax	Formula Two	Report
1961	(Federation of Rhodesia and Nyasaland) John Love	Cooper T56-BMC	Formula Junior	Report
1962	(France) José Rosinski	Cooper T59-Ford	Formula Junior	Report
1963	(France) Jacques Maglia	Lotus 22-Ford	Formula Junior	Report
1964	Not held			
1965	(United Kingdom) John Cardwell	Brabham BT15-Ford	Formula Three	Report
1966	(Australia) Martin Davies	Brabham BT10-Ford	Formula Three	Report
1967	(United Kingdom) Peter Westbury	Brabham BT21-Ford	Formula Three	Report
1968	(United Kingdom) Peter Westbury	Brabham BT21B-Ford	Formula Three	Report
1969	(Switzerland) Jean Blanc	Tecno 69-Ford	Formula Three	Report
1970	(United Kingdom) David Purley	Brabham BT28-Ford	Formula Three	Report
1971	(United Kingdom) David Purley	Brabham BT28-Ford	Formula Three	Report
1972	(United Kingdom) David Purley	Ensign LNF3-Ford	Formula Three	Report
