= Luigi Fagioli =

Italian racing driver (1898–1952)

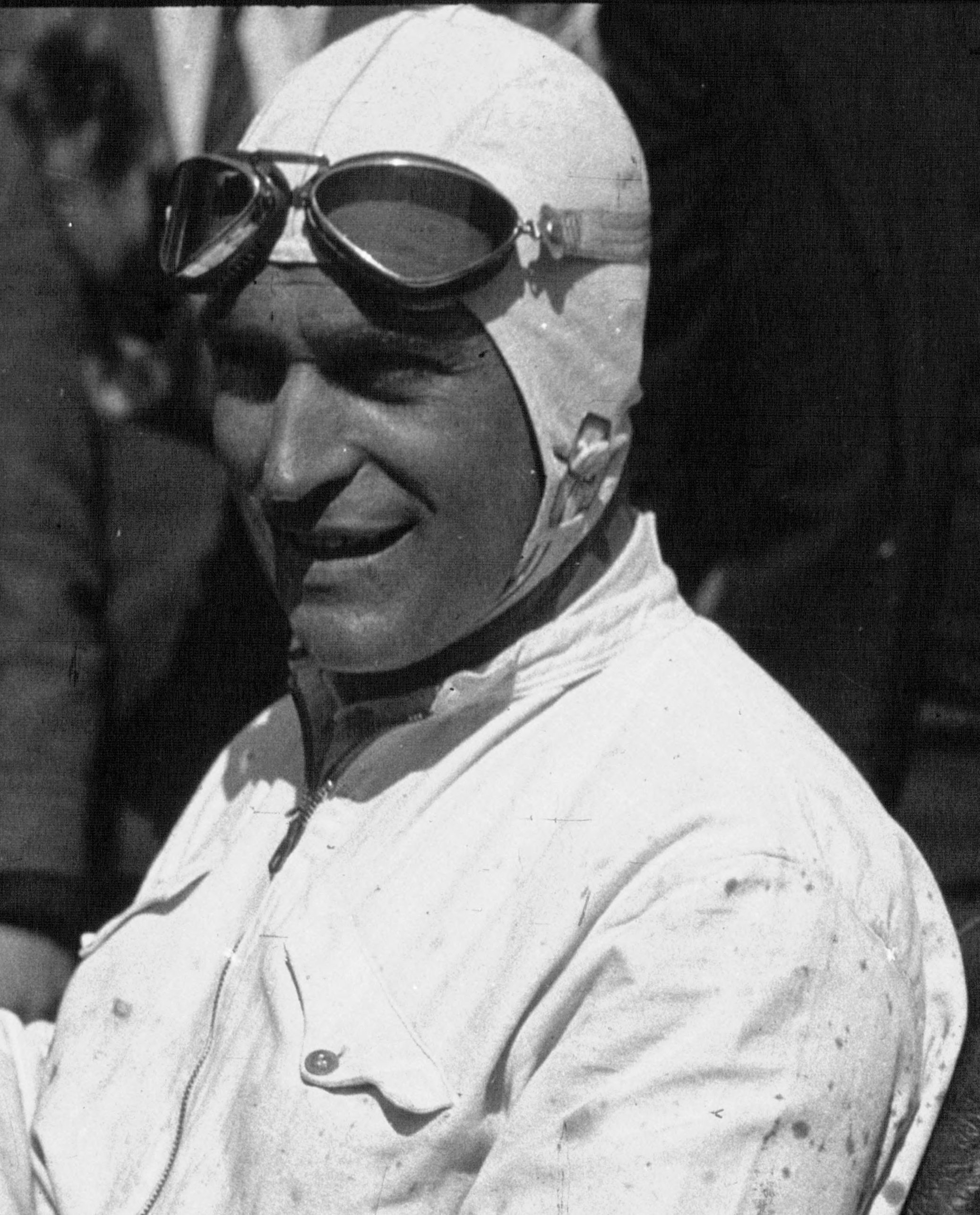
- Fagioli in 1932
- Born: Luigi Cristiano Fagioli; 9 June 1898; Osimo, Ancona, Kingdom of Italy
- Died: 20 June 1952 (aged 54); Monte Carlo, Monaco
- Cause of death: Injuries sustained whilst testing for the 1952 Monaco Grand Prix

Formula One World Championship career
- Nationality: (Italy) Italian
- Active years: 1950–1951
- Team: Alfa Romeo
- Entries: 7
- Championships: 0
- Wins: 1
- Podiums: 6
- Career points: 28 (32) (Note: Up until 1990, not all points scored by a driver contributed to their final World Championship tally (see list of points scoring systems for more information). Numbers without parentheses are Championship points; numbers in parentheses are total points scored.)
- Pole positions: 0
- Fastest laps: 0
- First entry: 1950 British Grand Prix
- First win: 1951 French Grand Prix
- Last entry: 1951 French Grand Prix

Luigi Cristiano Fagioli (Italian pronunciation: [luˈiːdʒi faˈdʒɔːli]; 9 June 1898 – 20 June 1952) was an Italian racing driver, who competed in Grand Prix motor racing from 1928 to 1949, (Note: Grand Prix motor racing was primarily suspended from 1940 to 1945, due to World War II.) and Formula One from 1950 to 1951. Nicknamed "the Abruzzi Robber", (Note: Fagioli was nicknamed The Abruzzi Robber by international press, but was not born or raised in the Abruzzi region of Italy.) Fagioli won the 1951 French Grand Prix with Alfa Romeo aged 53, and remains the oldest driver to win a Formula One Grand Prix. Fagioli was runner-up in the European Drivers' Championship in 1935 with Mercedes.

Fagioli is the only Formula One Grand Prix winner born in the 19th century, and the only Grand Prix racing driver to have won a championship race in both the AIACR European Championship and the World Drivers' Championship.

== Grand Prix racing ==
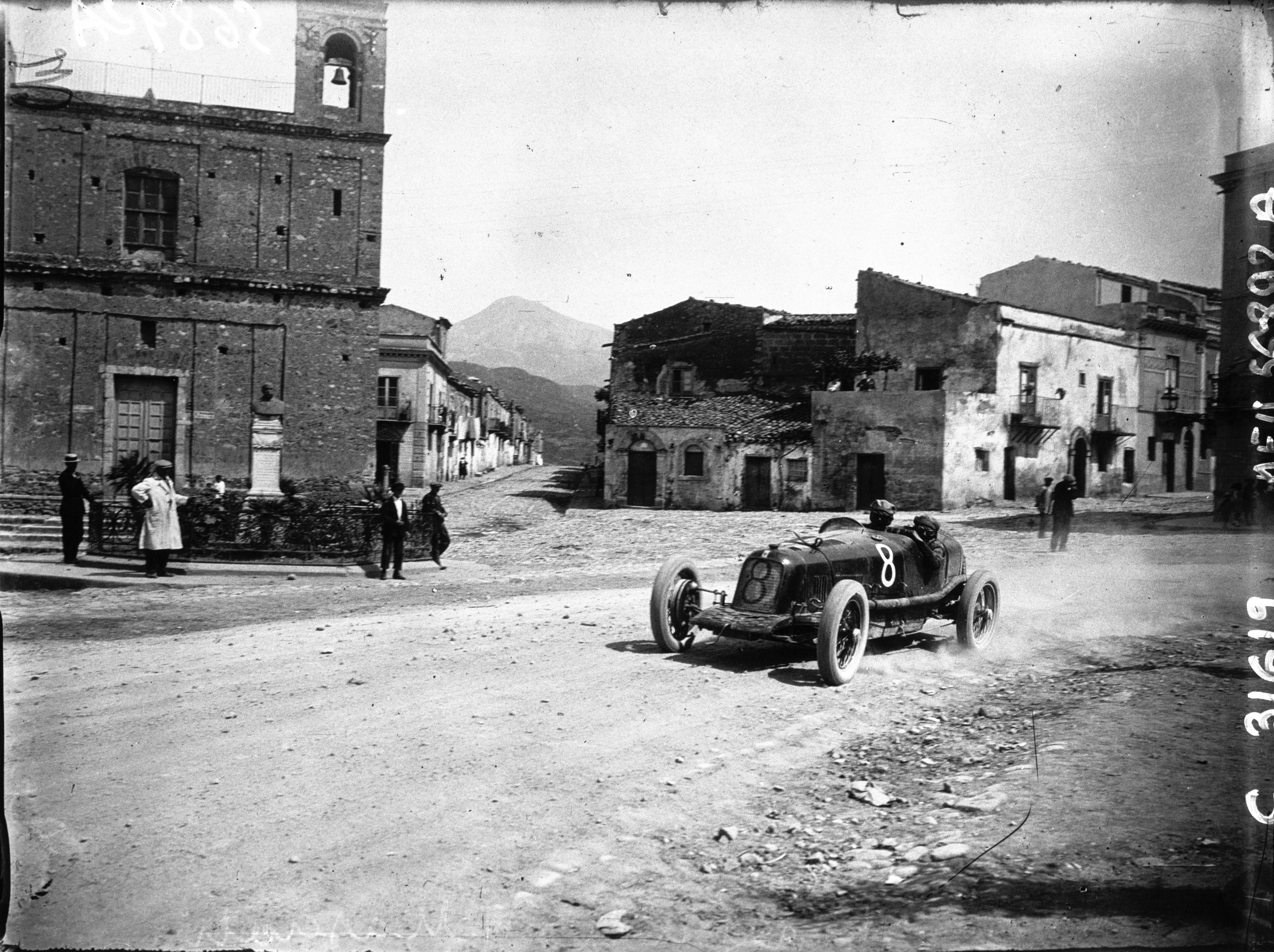
Fagioli at the 1928 Targa Florio

Fagioli was born in the small town of Osimo, in the Marche region in central Italy. As a boy he was fascinated by the relatively new invention of the automobile and the ensuing, newly-born racing scene. Blessed with great natural driving instincts, the young Fagioli started racing hillclimbing and sports car before entering Grand Prix racing in 1926. In 1930 he was offered the opportunity to join the Maserati team. He soon established himself as a serious contender, winning the Coppa Ciano and the Circuit of Avellino Grand Prix. In April the following year, he went head to head with Louis Chiron and his Bugatti Type 51 at the Monaco Grand Prix. In what would go down as one of motorsport's most famous battles, Chiron eventually took the chequered flag first but Fagioli received universal praise for the skill he displayed in racing a car set up for long stretches as opposed to the tight twists and short runs that characterize the street circuit of Monte Carlo. Fagioli avenged his defeat in Monaco a few weeks later by winning the Autodromo Nazionale Monza Grand Prix in Monza, Italy ahead of Chiron and fellow Italian drivers Achille Varzi and Tazio Nuvolari. In 1932, Fagioli won the Grand Prix of Rome driving for Maserati but for the 1933 season he signed with the Alfa Romeo team of Scuderia Ferrari. At the wheel of an Alfa Romeo P3, Fagioli ran a successful campaign, winning the Coppa Acerbo, the Grand Prix du Comminges, and the Italian Grand Prix. The win at Coppa Acerbo happened at the expense of Nuvolari, who was forced to retire with a mechanical failure while on the lead during the closing stages of the race. For this reason Fagioli became known as "Il ladro degli Abruzzi" (The Abruzzi Robber).

Fagioli's confidence in his abilities would occasionally inform his fiery temper. One not to refrain from retaliating against other drivers when he felt they had done something wrong on the track, he would frequently take chances, and as such developed a somewhat controversial reputation after a string of significant crashes. In 1934 Mercedes, acknowledging Fagioli's talent, hired him to drive one of their Silver Arrows alongside chief mechanic Hermann Lang. The relationship was successful although not without drama. In his very first outing for Mercedes, a furious Fagioli abandoned his car after team manager Alfred Neubauer ordered him to stay put in second place and let fellow Mercedes driver Manfred von Brauchitsch to win the race. Despite such bumpy start, Fagioli went on to win his second consecutive Coppa Acerbo and, together with Rudolf Caracciola in a Mercedes W25A, won his second straight Italian Grand Prix. Fagioli's third win of the season came on the occasion of the Spanish Grand Prix at the Circuito Lasarte.

For the 1935 racing season, Fagioli's factory Mercedes was upgraded to a W25B model. He won the Monaco Grand Prix, the AVUS and Penya Rhin Grand Prix. However, his relationship with the team soured after he displayed a blatant disregard for team orders by trying to take on Rudolf Caracciola on multiple occasions.

Fagioli left Mercedes at the end of the 1936 season and joined Auto Union. No longer restricted by team politics, his rivalry with Caracciola escalated, culminating in a physical altercation between the two at the Tripoli Grand Prix. Towards the end of the season, a series of health problems, including crippling rheumatism, began to severely affect Fagioli's racing ability. At the 1936 Coppa Acerbo, he could only walk with the aid of a cane and was forced to drop out of the race.

=== Formula One ===
By the end of World War II, Fagioli's health had improved and at 52 years old he joined Alfa-Romeo's 1950 Formula One squad for the first ever FIA World Championship. Fagioli drove the 158/159 Alfetta, and managed to score five podium finishes in six races, entering the final round as one of three drivers in contention for the title. Giuseppe Farina eventually won the championship, with Juan-Manuel Fangio finishing second and Fagioli third. In 1951 Fagioli won the French Grand Prix with Juan-Manuel Fangio, earning the distinction of being the oldest person to ever win a Formula One race. During the race, the Alfa Romeo team manager ordered him to hand over his healthy car to Fangio while Fagioli would drive Fangio's car, which was plagued with engine problems. This was common practice in Grand Prix racing before 1957 – Enzo Ferrari had done the same, ordering José Froilán González to hand over to the quicker and more experienced Alberto Ascari; Fagioli was allegedly so disappointed with this arrangement that he elected to retire from Formula One racing there and then.

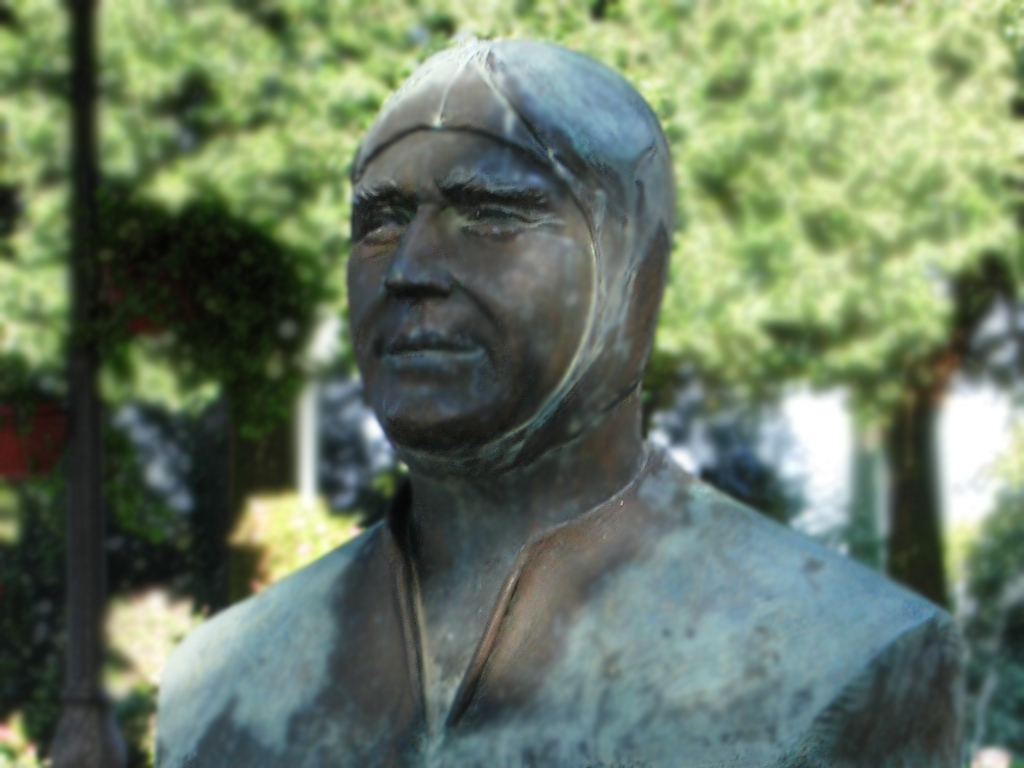
Luigi Fagioli statue in Osimo

For 1952, Fagioli signed with Lancia to drive sports cars. He finished in third place at the 1952 edition of the Mille Miglia ahead of arch rival Caracciola.

== Death ==
In June 1952, while practising for the Monaco Grand Prix, which was a sport cars event that year, Fagioli crashed in a Lancia Aurelia during practice in the tunnel. His injuries, initially believed to be minor, worsened after a few days. He died in a Monte Carlo hospital three weeks later.

== Legacy ==
Fagioli ranks as one of Italy's greatest race car drivers. With the exception of the 1950 Monaco Grand Prix, where a pile-up on the opening lap involving seven cars forced him to retire, he managed to finish on the podium of every single Formula One race he entered. That gives him the second-highest percentage of podium finishes in the Formula One World Championship (85.71%), after "one-time wonder" Dorino Serafini who has a perfect 100%.

== Major wins ==
- Avusrennen 1935
- Coppa Acerbo 1933, 1934
- Coppa Ciano 1930
- French Grand Prix/European Grand Prix 1951
- Grand Prix du Comminges 1933
- Italian Grand Prix 1933, 1934
- Monaco Grand Prix 1935
- Penya Rhin Grand Prix 1935
- Spanish Grand Prix 1934

== Racing record ==
=== Complete European Championship results ===
(key) (Races in bold indicate pole position) (Races in italics indicate fastest lap)

Year	Entrant	Chassis	Engine	1	2	3	4	5	6	7	EDC	Pts
1931	Officine A. Maserati	Maserati 26M	Maserati 2.8 L8	ITA	FRA; Ret	BEL					26th	22
1932	Officine A. Maserati	Maserati V5	Maserati 5.0 V16	ITA; 2	FRA	GER					7th	18
1935	Daimler-Benz AG	Mercedes W25A	Mercedes 4.0 L8	MON; 1	FRA; 4	BEL; 2	GER; 6	SUI; 2	ITA; Ret		2nd	22
1935	Daimler-Benz AG	Mercedes W25B	Mercedes 4.0 L8							ESP; 2	2nd	22
1936	Daimler-Benz AG	Mercedes W25	Mercedes 4.3 L8	MON; Ret							14th	26
1936	Daimler-Benz AG	Mercedes W25K	Mercedes 4.7 L8		GER; 5	SUI; Ret	ITA				14th	26
1937	Auto Union AG	Auto Union C	Auto Union 6.0 V16	BEL	GER; DNS	MON	SUI; 7	ITA			20th	36

=== Complete Formula One World Championship results ===
(key) (Races in bold indicate pole position) (Races in italics indicate fastest lap)

Year	Entrant	Chassis	Engine	1	2	3	4	5	6	7	8	WDC	Pts
1950	Alfa Romeo SpA	Alfa Romeo 158	Alfa Romeo 158 1.5 L8s	GBR; 2	MON; Ret	500	SUI; 2	BEL; 2	FRA; 2	ITA; 3		**3rd**	**24 (28)**
1951	Alfa Romeo SpA	Alfa Romeo 159	Alfa Romeo 158 1.5 L8s	SUI	500	BEL	FRA; 1*	GBR	GER	ITA	ESP	11th	4

* Fagioli exchanged cars with Juan Manuel Fangio, each being jointly classified 1st and 11th. Each scored half points for the win.

=== Non-championship Formula One results ===
(key) (Races in bold indicate pole position) (Races in italics indicate fastest lap)

Year	Entrant	Chassis	Engine	1	2	3	4	5	6	7	8	9	10	11	12	13	14	15	16	17
1950	Alfa Romeo SpA	Alfa Romeo 158	Alfa Romeo 158 1.5 L8s	PAU	RIC	SRM	PAR	EMP	BAR	JER	ALB	NED	NAT	NOT	ULS	PES; 3	STT	INT	GOO	PEN

== See also ==
- Trofeo Luigi Fagioli Hillclimb
