= 1947 Grand Prix des Frontières =

1947 Frontières Grand Prix
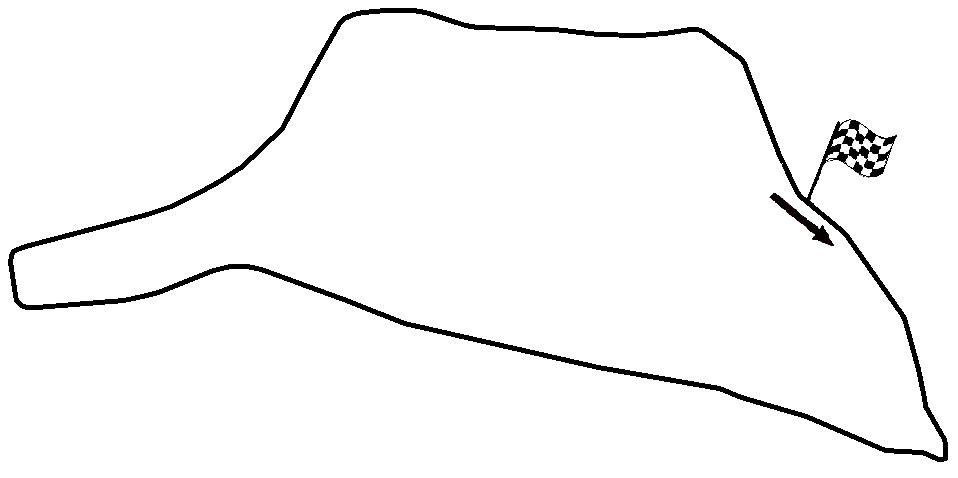

Race details
- Date: 25 May 1947
- Official name: XVII Grand Prix des Frontières
- Location: Chimay, Belgium
- Course: Temporary street circuit
- Course length: 10.87 km (6.75 mi)
- Distance: 12 laps, 130.44 km (81.05 mi)

Fastest lap
Driver	(Thailand) B. Bira	Maserati
- Time: 4:37

Podium
First	(Thailand) B. Bira	Maserati
Second	(United Kingdom) Peter Monkhouse	Bugatti
Third	(France) Louis Rosier	Talbot-Lago

The 17th Grand Prix des Frontières was a Formula Libre motor race held on 25 May 1947 at the Chimay Street Circuit in Chimay, Belgium. The Grand Prix was won by B. Bira in a Maserati 4CL. Bira also set fastest lap. Peter Monkhouse finished second in a Bugatti Type 51 and Louis Rosier was third in a Talbot-Lago.

== Classification ==
Pos	No	Driver	Car	Time/Retired
1	2	(Thailand) B. Bira	Maserati 4CL	59:10, 132.28 kph
2	14	(United Kingdom) Peter Monkhouse	Bugatti Type 51	+2:00
3	27	(France) Louis Rosier	Talbot-Lago Spéciale	+3:12
4	22	(Netherlands) Lex Beels	Alfa Romeo 8C 2300MM	+3:13
5	32	(United Kingdom) Roy Salvadori	Alfa Romeo P3	+4:23
6	38	(France) Henri Trillaud	Delahaye 135	+5:11
7	24	(United States) Harry Schell	Cisitalia D46	+1 lap
8	10	(United Kingdom) Tony Rolt	Aitken-Alfa Romeo	+1 lap
9	44	(Belgium) "Lucky"	Alfa Romeo 8C-2300MM	+1 lap
10	26	(France) Raymond de Saugé	Cisitalia D46	+1 lap
11	34	(France) "Freige"	Monnier-Fiat	+2 laps
12	28	(United Kingdom) Ted Lund	MG PB	+3 laps
NC	33	(France) Michel Roumani	Bugatti Type 35	
Ret	6	(United Kingdom) George Abecassis	Bugatti Type 59	5 laps
Ret	40	(France) Gabriel Lascaut	Salmson	4 laps
Ret	36	(France) Yves Giraud-Cabantous	Delahaye 135	4 laps
Ret	20	(Belgium) Arthur Legat	Bugatti Type 35B	4 laps
Ret	16	(United Kingdom) John Bolster	ERA	3 laps
DNS	8	"Vandervecken"	Alfa Romeo	
DNS	12	"Steinbach"	Alfa Romeo 2900B	
DNS	30	(France) Serge Pozzoli	Delahaye 135	
DNS	48	(Italy) Guido Barbieri	Maserati 4CL	
DNS	52	(Republic of Ireland) Joe Kelly	Riley	
DNS	56	(France) Raymond Sommer	Maserati 4CL	
DNS	58	(France) Henri Louveau	Delage D6	

Grand Prix Race
1947 Grand Prix season
Previous race: 1946 Grand Prix des Frontières	Grand Prix des Frontières	Next race: 1948 Grand Prix des Frontières
