= 1949 Zandvoort Grand Prix =

Race details
- Date: 31 July 1949
- Official name: II Grote Prijs van Zandvoort
- Location: Circuit Zandvoort, Zandvoort, Netherlands
- Course: Permanent racing facility
- Course length: 4.193 km (2.605 miles)
- Distance: 40 laps, 167.720 km (104.216 miles)

Pole position
| Driver | (Italy) Luigi Villoresi | Ferrari |

Fastest lap
| Driver | (United Kingdom) Reg Parnell | Maserati |
- Time: 1:57.8

Podium
| First | (Italy) Luigi Villoresi | Ferrari |
| Second | (Switzerland) Emmanuel de Graffenried | Maserati |
| Third | (Thailand) Prince Bira | Maserati |

The 1949 Zandvoort Grand Prix was a non-championship Formula One race held on 31 July 1949 at Circuit Zandvoort.

== Report ==
The event consisted of two 25-lap heats and a 40-lap final. The cars were split based on their racing numbers, the lower numbers (1–9) competing in Heat 1 and the higher numbers (14–21) in Heat 2. A qualifying session determined the grid for each heat.

Giuseppe Farina secured pole position for Heat 1 at 1:54.8, the fastest time of the weekend. However, Luigi Villoresi beat him at the start and took the heat unchallenged, setting the fastest lap at 1:59.3. Farina could not challenge due to a misfire, but still finished second. Reigning race winner Prince Bira was third. St John Horsfall finished sixth but chose not to start the final due to a stiff piston.

Alberto Ascari secured pole position for Heat 2 at 1:55.0. Reg Parnell led the first lap but Ascari retook the lead and steadily pulled away. The race complexion changed in the middle phase: heavy rain began to fall, which better suited Parnell, and at the same time Ascari developed minor engine issues. Parnell closed a 23-second gap to Ascari and won the heat. Ascari set the fastest lap at 2:01. Geoffrey Crossley finished sixth; he handed his Alta over to George Abecassis for the final. Peter Whitehead retired with a broken magneto and Raymond Sommer suffered a broken throttle control.

The final was hotly contested between Ascari and Villoresi, the two Ferrari drivers trading the lead until lap 34 when a wheel fell off Ascari's car. Farina and Parnell had jumped the start and were handed a one-minute post-race time penalty after respectively finishing second and fifth on the road.

== Entries ==
| No | Driver | Entrant | Constructor | Chassis |
|---|---|---|---|---|
| 1 | (Italy) Luigi Villoresi | Scuderia Ferrari | Ferrari | Ferrari 125 |
| 2 | (Italy) Giuseppe Farina | Scuderia Ambrosiana | Maserati | Maserati 4CLT/48 |
| 3 | (Thailand) Prince Bira | Scuderia Enrico Platé | Maserati | Maserati 4CLT/48 |
| 4 | (United Kingdom) St John Horsfall | P.H. Bell | ERA | ERA R11B |
| 5 | (United Kingdom) Cuth Harrison | Cuth Harrison | ERA | ERA B |
| 6 | (Belgium) Johnny Claes | Ecurie Belge | Talbot-Lago | Talbot-Lago T26C |
| 7 | (United Kingdom) David Hampshire | David Hampshire | ERA | ERA R1A |
| 8 | (United Kingdom) Joe Ashmore | Scuderia Ambrosiana | Maserati | Maserati 4CLT/48 |
| 9 | (France) Louis Rosier | Ecurie Rosier | Talbot-Lago | Talbot-Lago T26C |
| 10 | (Monaco) Louis Chiron | Ecurie France | Talbot-Lago | Talbot-Lago T26C |
| 14 | (Italy) Alberto Ascari | Scuderia Ferrari | Ferrari | Ferrari 125 |
| 15 | (United Kingdom) Reg Parnell | Scuderia Ambrosiana | Maserati | Maserati 4CLT/48 |
| 16 | (Switzerland) Emmanuel de Graffenried | Scuderia Enrico Platé | Maserati | Maserati 4CLT/48 |
| 17 | (United Kingdom) Bob Gerard | Bob Gerard | ERA | ERA R14B |
| 18 | (United Kingdom) Peter Whitehead | Scuderia Ferrari | Ferrari | Ferrari 125 |
| 19 | (France) Raymond Sommer | Equipe Gordini | Simca Gordini | Simca-Gordini T15 |
| 20 | (United Kingdom) Geoffrey Crossley | Alta Works | Alta | Alta GP |
| 21 | (France) Philippe Étancelin | Philippe Étancelin | Talbot-Lago | Talbot-Lago T26C |
| 22 | (United Kingdom) Leslie Brooke | Leslie Brooke | Maserati | Maserati 4CLT/48 |
| 23 | (France) Guy Mairesse | Ecurie France | Talbot-Lago | Talbot-Lago T26C |

== Classification ==
=== Heat 1 ===
| Pos | No | Driver | Constructor | Laps | Time/retired | Grid |
|---|---|---|---|---|---|---|
| 1 | 1 | (Italy) Luigi Villoresi | Ferrari | 25 | 51:29.2 | 2 |
| 2 | 2 | (Italy) Giuseppe Farina | Maserati | 25 | +20.6 | 1 |
| 3 | 3 | (Thailand) Prince Bira | Maserati | 25 | +1:11.7 | 5 |
| 4 | 9 | (France) Louis Rosier | Talbot-Lago | 25 | +1:33.8 | 4 |
| 5 | 5 | (United Kingdom) Cuth Harrison | ERA | 24 | +1 lap | 3 |
| 6 | 4 | (United Kingdom) St John Horsfall | ERA | 24 | +1 lap | 7 |
| 7 | 6 | (Belgium) Johnny Claes | Talbot-Lago | ? | | 6 |
| 8 | 7 | (United Kingdom) David Hampshire | ERA | ? | | 8 |

=== Heat 2 ===
| Pos | No | Driver | Constructor | Laps | Time/retired | Grid |
|---|---|---|---|---|---|---|
| 1 | 15 | (United Kingdom) Reg Parnell | Maserati | 25 | 52:30.2 | 3 |
| 2 | 14 | (Italy) Alberto Ascari | Ferrari | 25 | +10.7 | 1 |
| 3 | 16 | (Switzerland) Emmanuel de Graffenried | Maserati | 25 | +10.9 | 4 |
| 4 | 21 | (France) Philippe Étancelin | Talbot-Lago | 25 | +1:11.2 | 2 |
| 5 | 17 | (United Kingdom) Bob Gerard | ERA | 24 | +1 lap | 6 |
| 6 | 20 | (United Kingdom) Geoffrey Crossley | Alta | 22 | +3 laps | 8 |
| Ret | 19 | (France) Raymond Sommer | Simca Gordini | ? | Throttle | 7 |
| Ret | 18 | (United Kingdom) Peter Whitehead | Ferrari | ? | Magneto | 5 |

=== Final ===
| Pos | No | Driver | Constructor | Laps | Time/retired | Grid |
|---|---|---|---|---|---|---|
| 1 | 1 | (Italy) Luigi Villoresi | Ferrari | 40 | 1:21.06.9 | 1 |
| 2 | 16 | (Switzerland) Emmanuel de Graffenried | Maserati | 40 | +30.3 | |
| 3 | 3 | (Thailand) Prince Bira | Maserati | 40 | +41.9 | |
| 4 | 2 | (Italy) Giuseppe Farina | Maserati | 40 | +1:23.7 | |
| 5 | 21 | (France) Philippe Étancelin | Talbot-Lago | 40 | +1:52.7 | |
| 6 | 15 | (United Kingdom) Reg Parnell | Maserati | 40 | +2:00.3 | 2/3 |
| 7 | 17 | (United Kingdom) Bob Gerard | ERA | 39 | +1 lap | |
| 8 | 9 | (France) Louis Rosier | Talbot-Lago | 39 | +1 lap | |
| 9 | 6 | (Belgium) Johnny Claes | Talbot-Lago | 38 | +2 laps | |
| 10 | 7 | (United Kingdom) David Hampshire | ERA | 35 | +5 laps | |
| Ret | 14 | (Italy) Alberto Ascari | Ferrari | 34 | Wheel lost | 2/3 |
| Ret | 5 | (United Kingdom) Cuth Harrison | ERA | 26 | Mechanical | |
| Ret | 20 | (United Kingdom) George Abecassis | Alta | 24 | Overheating | |
| DNS | 4 | (United Kingdom) St John Horsfall | ERA | | Engine | |
| DNQ | 19 | (France) Raymond Sommer | Simca Gordini | | Ret Heat 2 | |
| DNQ | 18 | (United Kingdom) Peter Whitehead | Ferrari | | Ret Heat 2 | |
| DNA | 8 | (United Kingdom) Joe Ashmore | Maserati | | | |
| DNA | 10 | (Monaco) Louis Chiron | Talbot-Lago | | | |
| DNA | 22 | (United Kingdom) Leslie Brooke | Maserati | | | |
| DNA | 23 | (France) Guy Mairesse | Talbot-Lago | | | |

| Previous race: 1949 French Grand Prix | Formula One non-championship races 1949 season | Next race: 1949 BRDC International Trophy |
| Previous race: 1948 Zandvoort Grand Prix | Zandvoort Grand Prix | Next race: None; Next race at the Circuit Zandvoort: 1950 Dutch Grand Prix |
