= Trofeo Luigi Fagioli Hillclimb =

Hillclimbing competition in Gubbio, Italy

Trofeo Luigi Fagioli
Gubbio–Madonna della Cima
- Location: Gubbio, Umbria, Italy
- Time zone: CEST
- Coordinates: 43.37°N 12.60°E
- Opened: 1966
- Former Names: Gubbio–Mengara
- Major Events: Campionato Italiano Velocità Montagna (CIVM)
- Hill Length: 4,150 metres (4,540 yd)
- Turns: 2
- Hill Record: 3:07.28 (Simone Faggioli, 2015, CIVM)

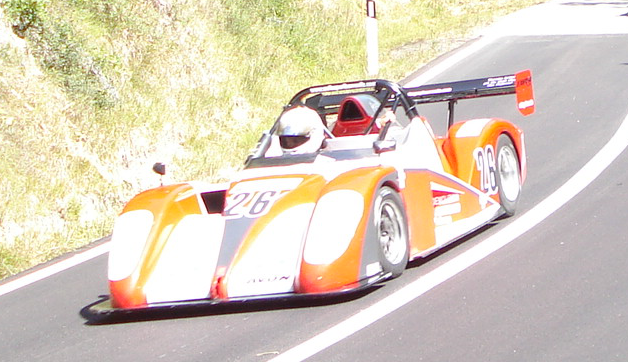

The Trofeo Luigi Fagioli Hillclimb is a hillclimbing competition held in Gubbio, Italy. The course is 4,150 metres (2.58 mi) in length. The track hosts a round of the Italian Hill Climb Championship also known as Campionato Italiano Velocità Montagna (CIVM).

== History ==
The trophy was established in 1966 in honour of the Italian racing driver Luigi Fagioli.

== List of winners ==
=== By modern cars ===
Classification:

Edition	Date	Winner	Car	Time	Average km/h
1966	5 June 1966	(Italy) Ravetto Clemente	Ferrari	2:36.70	119.463
1967	2 June 1967	(Italy) "Gano"	Porsche	2:26.70	127.607
1968	6 October 1968	(Italy) Lualdi Edoardo	Ferrari	2:12.00	113.178
1969	13 April 1969	(Italy) Zuccoli Carlo	Alfa Romeo	2:37.90	94.615
1970	30 August 1970	(Italy) Andrenacci Giuliano	Alfa Romeo	2:25.90	102.822
1971	29 August 1971	(Italy) Scola Domenico	Chevron	2:06.83	117.982
1972	27 August 1972	(Italy) Laureati Pietro	Chevron	2:04.41	120.084
1973	26 August 1973	(Italy) Scola Domenico	March	2:06.40	118.184
1974	25 August 1974	(Italy) "Gianfranco"	Osella	2:02.53	121.927
1975	24 August 1975	(Italy) Nardini Roberto	Porsche	2:29.11	100.193
1976	8 August 1976	(Italy) Ciuti Gabriele	Osella	1:58.40	126.162
1977	24 July 1977	(Italy) Varese Gianni	Osella	2:02.00	122.458
1978	6 August 1978	(Italy) Varese Gianni	Osella	1:58.00	126.609
1979	26 August 1979	(Italy) Varese Gianni	Osella	2:12.80	105.356
1980	3 August 1980	(Italy) Varese Gianni	Osella	1:56.80	127.919
1981	2 August 1981	(Italy) Angelo Giliberti	Osella	1:55.80	129.015
1982	20 June 1982	(Italy) Bogani Ettore	Osella	1:55.90	128.984
1983	19 June 1983	(Italy) Mario Caliceti	Osella	1:55.60	129.239
1984	30 September 1984	(Italy) Patrizio Calella	Lola	1:54.36	130.640
1985	16 June 1985	(Italy) Mario Caliceti	Osella	1:53.07	132.131
1986	15 June 1986	(Italy) Adriano Boldrini	Renault 5t	4:50.20	102.963
1987	2 August 1987	(Italy) Stanislao Bielanski	Osella	3:47.55	131.312
1988	24 July 1988	(Italy) "Ricky" Braconi	Osella	3:40.51	135.504
1989	Only historic cars				
1990	30 September 1990	(Italy) Mario Caliceti	Osella	3:46.16	132.110
1991	16 June 1991	(Italy) Salvatore Curatolo	Osella BMW	3:46.65	131.830
1992	14 June 1992	(Italy) Antonino Ritacca	Osella	3:45.44	132.541
1993	10 October 1993	(Italy) Antonino Iaria	Osella BMW	3:41.79	134.720
1994	28 August 1994	(Italy) Antonino Iaria	Osella BMW	3:41.69	134.783
1995	20 August 1995	(Italy) Mauro Nesti	Lucchini BMW	3:42.86	134.070
1996	25 August 1996	(Italy) Fabio Danti	Osella BMW	3:33.16	140.170
1997	10 August 1997	(Italy) "Ricky" Braconi	Osella BMW	3:34.57	139.225
1998	9 August 1998	(Italy) Franz Tschager	Lucchini BMW	3:27.81	143.785
1999	29 August 1999	(Italy) Pasquale Irlando	Osella BMW	3:29.34	142.734
2000	29 August 2000	(Italy) Pasquale Irlando	Osella BMW	3:51.37	129.144
2001	26 August 2001	(Italy) Simone Faggioli	Osella BMW	4:01.26	123.850
2002	25 August 2002	(Italy) Simone Faggioli	Osella PA 20 BMW	3:44.55	133.066
2003	24 August 2003	(Italy) Fabrizio Fattorini	Osella BMW	3:39.31	136.245
2004	22 August 2004	(Italy) Franco Cinelli	Osella Pa 20/s BMW	3:34.14	139.5
2005	20 August 2005	(Italy) Fabrizio Peroni	Lucchini Renault	4:31.06	110.2
2006	21 August 2006	(Italy) Simone Faggioli	Osella PA/21 S	3:31.76	141.1
2007	19 August 2007	(Italy) Rosario Iaquinta	Lola T 99/50 ZYTEK	3:29.47	142.6
2008	24 August 2008	(Italy) Simone Faggioli	Osella PA/27	3:17.60	151.2
2009	23 August 2009	(Italy) Simone Faggioli	Osella FA/30	3:13.481	154.4
2010	22 August 2010	(Italy) Simone Faggioli	Osella FA/30	3:15.30	153.0
2011	21 August 2011	(Italy) Simone Faggioli	Osella FA/30	3:14.36	
2012	26 August 2012	(Italy) Simone Faggioli	Osella FA/30	3:16.33	152.2
2013	25 August 2013	(Italy) Simone Faggioli	Osella FA/30	3:31.20	141.5
2014	24 August 2014	(Italy) Simone Faggioli	Norma M20 FC	3:08.36	158.4
2015	23 August 2015	(Italy) Simone Faggioli	Norma M20 FC	3:07.28	159.6
2016	21 August 2016	(Italy) Domenico Scola	Osella FA/30 Zytek	3:10.97	156.5
2017	20 August 2017	(Italy) Domenico Scola	Osella FA/30 Zytek	3:12.08	155.6
2018	19 August 2018	(Italy) Omar Magliona	Norma M20 FC	3:09.43	157.7
2019	25 August 2019	(Italy) Christian Merli	Osella FA/30 Zytek	3:23.61	146.8
2020	23 August 2020	(Italy) Christian Merli	Osella FA/30 Zytek	3:08.14	158.8

=== By historic cars ===
Classification:

Edition	Date	Winner	Car	Time	Average km/h
1989	23 July 1989	(Italy) Maurizio Pinchetti	Lotus	4:12.66	113.987
1990	30 September 1990	(Italy) Scaioli	Lotus	4:46.36	104.344
1991	16 June 1991	(Italy) Bettino Ghisla	Lotus	4:31.52	110.040
1992	14 June 1992	(Italy) Carlo Steinhauslin	Lotus	5:04.45	98.144
1993	10 October 1993	(Italy) Maurizio Pinchetti	Lotus	4:38.32	107.358
1994	28 August 1994	(Italy) Giovanni Anzeloni	Merlin Mk6	4:39.36	106.959
1995	20 August 1995	(Italy) Franco Breschi	Lola	4:23.98	113.190
1996	25 August 1996	(Italy) Giovanni Anzeloni	Osella BMW	4:02.64	123.140
1997	10 August 1997	(Italy) Franco Breschi	Lola	4:06.46	121.237
1998	9 August 1998	(Italy) Roberto Benelli	Osella BMW	3:59.16	124.937
1999	29 August 1999	(Italy) Roberto Benelli	Osella Pa 9 BMW	3:55.68	126.782
2000	20 August 2000	(Italy) Fabrizio Peroni	Osella BMW	4:09.51	120.237
2001	26 August 2001	(Italy) Fabrizio Peroni	Osella BMW	4:21.28	114.360
2002	25 August 2002	(Italy) Michele Serafini	Osella PA/7	4:02.99	122.968
2003	24 August 2003	(Italy) Fabrizio Peroni	Osella PA/7	3:58.80	125.126
2004	22 August 2004	(Italy) Uberto Bonucci	Osella PA/3	3:47.72	131.2
2005	20 August 2005	(Italy) Fabrizio Peroni	Osella PA/7	4:17.30	116.1
2006	21 August 2006	(Italy) Uberto Bonucci	Osella PA/9	3:58.28	125.4
2007	19 August 2007	(Italy) Uberto Bonucci	Osella PA/9	3:48.40	130.8
2008	24 August 2008	(Italy) Fabrizio Peroni	Osella PA/9	4:20.561	114.70
2009	23 August 2009	(Italy) Uberto Bonucci	Osella PA/9	3:49.579	130.2
2010	22 August 2010	(Italy) Cherubini Carlo	Lucchini SN86	4:26.78	112.0
2011	21 August 2011	(Italy) Uberto Bonucci	Osella PA/9	3:42.23	134.5
2012	26 August 2012	(Italy) Franco Cremonesi	Osella PA/9	4:40.03	106.7
2013	25 August 2013	(Italy) Franco Cremonesi	Osella PA/9	4:57.68	100.4
2014	24 August 2014	(Italy) Uberto Bonucci	Osella PA/9	3:42.48	134.3
2015	23 August 2015	(Italy) Uberto Bonucci	Osella PA/9	3:36.44	138.1
2016	21 August 2016	(Italy) Uberto Bonucci	Osella PA/9	3:39.19	136.3
2017	20 August 2017	(Italy) Uberto Bonucci	Osella PA/9	3:39.73	136.0
2018	19 August 2018	(Italy) Uberto Bonucci	Osella PA/9	3:37.14	137.6
2019	25 August 2019	(Italy) Adolfo Bottura	Osella PA/9/90	4:02.48	123.2
2020	23 August 2020	(Italy) Roberto Turriziani	Osella PA/9/90	4:19.27	115.2

Note

- The first and the second edition, was held in the Gubbio–Mengara track;
- Since the third edition, the race was held in the Gubbio–Madonna della Cima track;
- Since 1986 edition, the race was held in two rounds;
- The 1988 edition, was held in a 4 kilometres (2.5 mi) track;
- The 1989 edition, was only open to historic cars;
- The 2000 edition, was held with three chicanes of "2000 type";
- The 2001 edition, was held with three chicanes of "2001 type";
- The 2002 edition, was held with three chicanes of "2002 type".

== See also ==
- Luigi Fagioli
- Gubbio

== Notes ==
1. A timing error in 2018 meant all recorded times were around two seconds lower (i.e. faster) than the true times set by each car. The time and speed quoted here have been inflated by exactly two seconds to account for this.
