= 1950 Albi Grand Prix =

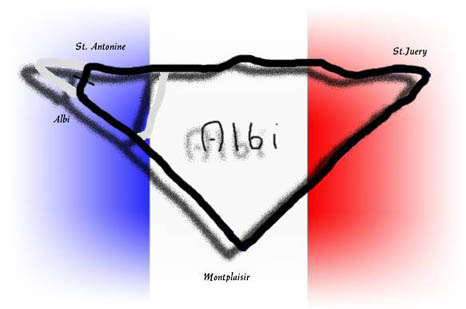
- Circuit Les Planques

Race details
- Date: 16 July 1950
- Official name: XII Circuit de l'Albigeois
- Location: Albi, France
- Course: Circuit Les Planques
- Course length: 8.880 km (5.518 miles)
- Distance: 2x17 laps, 301.9 km (187.6 miles)

Pole position
Driver	(Argentina) Juan Manuel Fangio	Maserati
- Time: 3:06.7

Fastest lap
Driver	(Argentina) Juan Manuel Fangio	Maserati
- Time: 3:06.7

Podium
First	(France) Louis Rosier	Talbot
Second	(Argentina) José Froilán González	Maserati
Third	(France) Maurice Trintignant	Simca-Gordini

The 1950 Albi Grand Prix was a non-championship Formula One race held on 16 July 1950.

The race was contested over two heats of 17 laps with the result decided by aggregate. The winner was Louis Rosier in a Talbot-Lago after finishing third and second in respectively Heat 1 and Heat 2. José Froilán González finished second in a Maserati and Maurice Trintignant came in third in a Simca-Gordini. Juan Manuel Fangio in a Maserati set fastest lap.

== Qualifying ==
Pos.	No.	Driver	Entrant	Car	Time
1	10	(Argentina) Juan Manuel Fangio	Scuderia Achille Varzi	Maserati 4CLT/48	3:06.7
2	12	(Argentina) José Froilán González	Scuderia Achille Varzi	Maserati 4CLT/48	+1.9
3	6	(France) Raymond Sommer	Raymond Sommer	Talbot-Lago T26C	+3.3
4	8	(Italy) Giuseppe Farina	Giuseppe Farina	Maserati 4CLT/48	+4.3
5	2	(France) Louis Rosier	Ecurie Rosier	Talbot-Lago T26C	+5.9
6	16	(Italy) Luigi Villoresi	Scuderia Ferrari	Ferrari 275	+6.0
7	4	(France) Philippe Étancelin	Philippe Étancelin	Talbot-Lago T26C	+8.7
8	18	(Italy) Alberto Ascari	Scuderia Ferrari	Ferrari 125	+9.3
9	38	(France) Yves Giraud-Cabantous	Ecurie France/Yves Giraud-Cabantous	Talbot-Lago T26C	+10.1
10	32	(Belgium) Johnny Claes	Ecurie Belge	Talbot-Lago T26C	+14.6
11	34	(France) Pierre Levegh	Pierre Levegh	Talbot-Lago T26C	+16.7
12	14	(Italy) Nello Pagani	Scuderia Achille Varzi	Maserati 4CLT/48	+20.8
13	22	(France) Maurice Trintignant	Equipe Gordini	Simca-Gordini Type 15	+23.9
14	20	(France) Robert Manzon	Equipe Gordini	Simca-Gordini Type 15	+24.8
15	24	(Thailand) B. Bira	Enrico Platé	Maserati 4CLT/48	No time
16	26	(Switzerland) Emmanuel de Graffenried	Enrico Platé	Maserati 4CLT/48	No time
DNA	28	(Italy) Felice Bonetto	Scuderia Milano	Maserati 4CLT/48	-
DNA	30	(Italy) Gianfranco Comotti	Scuderia Milano	Maserati 4CLT/48	-
DNA	38	(France) Pierre Meyrat	Ecurie France/Yves Giraud-Cabantous	Talbot-Lago T26C	Reserve driver

== Results ==
=== Heats ===
Heat 1

Pos.	Driver	Constructor	Time
1	(France) Raymond Sommer	Talbot-Lago	55:53.6
2	(Argentina) Juan Manuel Fangio	Maserati	+0.5
3	(France) Louis Rosier	Talbot-Lago	+27.6
4	(Argentina) José Froilán González	Maserati	+1:14.6
5	(France) Maurice Trintignant	Simca-Gordini	+2:42.6
6	(Italy) Nello Pagani	Maserati	16 laps
7	(France) Pierre Levegh	Talbot-Lago	16 laps
8	(France) Robert Manzon	Simca-Gordini	16 laps
9	(Italy) Alberto Ascari	Ferrari	16 laps
10	(Belgium) Johnny Claes	Talbot-Lago	15 laps
NC	(Italy) Giuseppe Farina	Maserati	14 laps
NC	(Switzerland) Emmanuel de Graffenried	Maserati	11 laps
Ret	(Italy) Luigi Villoresi	Ferrari	Ignition
Ret	(Thailand) B. Bira	Maserati	Rear axle
Ret	(France) Yves Giraud-Cabantous	Talbot-Lago	Rear axle
Ret	(France) Philippe Étancelin	Talbot-Lago	Driver injured

Heat 2

Pos.	Driver	Constructor	Time
1	(Argentina) José Froilán González	Maserati	56:27.7
2	(France) Louis Rosier	Talbot-Lago	+19.7
3	(Italy) Giuseppe Farina	Maserati	+2:37.8
4	(France) Pierre Levegh	Talbot-Lago	+3:33.5
5	(France) Maurice Trintignant	Simca-Gordini	16 laps
6	(France) Robert Manzon	Simca-Gordini	16 laps
7	(Italy) Nello Pagani	Maserati	16 laps
8	(Switzerland) Emmanuel de Graffenried	Maserati	16 laps
NC	(Belgium) Johnny Claes	Talbot-Lago	14 laps
Ret	(France) Philippe Étancelin	Talbot-Lago	Valve
Ret	(Italy) Alberto Ascari	Ferrari	
DNS	(United Kingdom) Raymond Sommer	Talbot-Lago	Damaged car
DNS	(Argentina) Juan Manuel Fangio	Maserati	Oil leak

=== Aggregate ===
Pos.	Driver	Constructor	Time
1	(France) Louis Rosier	Talbot-Lago	1:53:08.6
2	(Argentina) José Froilán González	Maserati	+27.3
3	(France) Maurice Trintignant	Simca-Gordini	33 laps
4	(France) Pierre Levegh	Talbot-Lago	33 laps
5	(France) Robert Manzon	Simca-Gordini	32 laps
6	(Italy) Nello Pagani	Maserati	32 laps
7	(Italy) Giuseppe Farina	Maserati	31 laps
8	(Belgium) Johnny Claes	Talbot-Lago	29 laps
9	(Switzerland) Emmanuel de Graffenried	Maserati	27 laps
NC	(Italy) Alberto Ascari	Ferrari	-
NC	(France) Raymond Sommer	Talbot-Lago	-
NC	(Argentina) Juan Manuel Fangio	Maserati	-
NC	(Italy) Luigi Villoresi	Ferrari	-
NC	(France) Philippe Étancelin	Talbot-Lago	-
NC	(France) Yves Giraud-Cabantous	Talbot-Lago	-
NC	(Thailand) Prince Bira	Maserati	-

Previous race: 1950 Jersey Road Race	Formula One non-championship races 1950 season	Next race: 1950 Dutch Grand Prix
Previous race: 1949 Albi Grand Prix	Albi Grand Prix	Next race: 1951 Albi Grand Prix
