= 1951 French Grand Prix =

← Previous race	Next race →
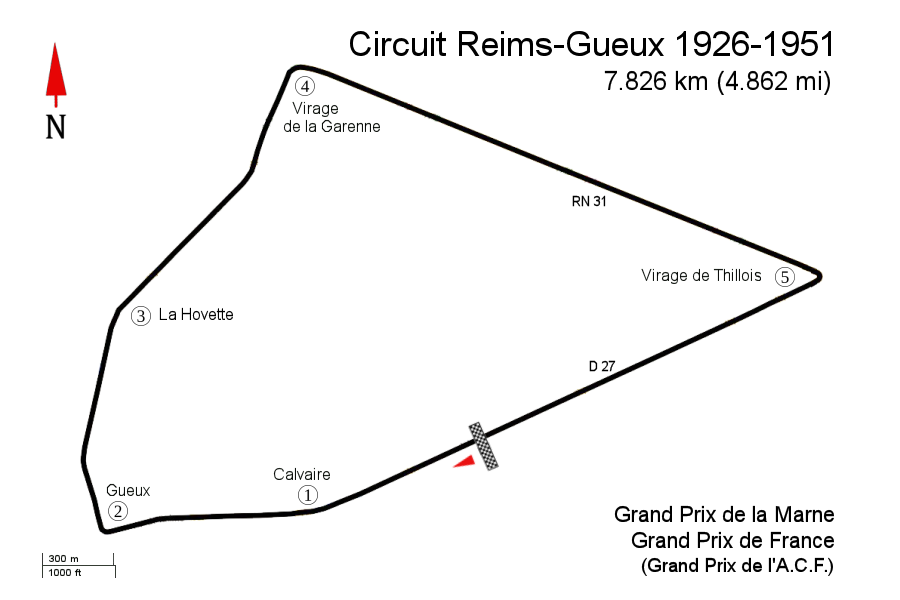

Race details
- Date: 1 July 1951
- Official name: XXXVIII Grand Prix de l'ACF
- Location: Reims, France
- Course: Reims-Gueux
- Course length: 7.816 km (4.856 miles)
- Distance: 77 laps, 601.832 km (373.961 miles)
- Weather: Sunny, Hot, Dry

Pole position
Driver	(Argentina) Juan Manuel Fangio	Alfa Romeo
- Time: 2:25.7

Fastest lap
Driver	(Argentina) Juan Manuel Fangio	Alfa Romeo
- Time: 2:27.8 on lap 32

Podium
First	(Italy) Luigi Fagioli; (Argentina) Juan Manuel Fangio	Alfa Romeo
Second	(Argentina) José Froilán González; (Italy) Alberto Ascari	Ferrari
Third	(Italy) Luigi Villoresi	Ferrari

The 1951 French Grand Prix was a Formula One motor race held at Reims-Gueux on 1 July 1951. It was race 4 of 8 in the 1951 World Championship of Drivers and was won by Juan Manuel Fangio and Luigi Fagioli driving an Alfa Romeo. It was the first of three occasions where two drivers would be credited with a Grand Prix win after sharing a car.

The race, which also carried the honorific title of European Grand Prix, saw the World Championship debuts of Aldo Gordini, André Simon and Onofre Marimón. Fagioli's victory, his first in a World Championship race, made him the oldest driver to win a World Championship Grand Prix, a record he still holds. This race also holds the record for the longest Formula One Grand Prix in terms of total distance needed to cover. 77 laps of the 4.856 mile Reims-Gueux circuit totaled to 373.961 miles.

== Report ==
About 10 laps into the race, the engine in Fangio's car began misfiring, so he stopped at the pits to have the magneto changed, but only completed one further lap before stopping again. Around this time, the gearbox in Ascari's Ferrari had broken, and he retired, although he took over the car of González, who had been pushing very hard. When Fagioli came in for his fuel stop, the team ordered Fagioli and Fangio to swap cars; Fagioli's car was running healthily whereas Fangio's car had multiple mechanical problems. Fuel stops and problems for the Ferraris enabled Fangio to make his way into the lead and win the race, with Ascari in González's original car finishing 2nd, 52 seconds behind. Fagioli, in Fangio's original car, finished 11th, 22 laps behind. Fagioli, a veteran racing driver who had been racing Grand Prix cars since the 1920s and known for his fiery temperament was so furious over handing his car over to Fangio that he quit Grand Prix racing on the spot; he only raced this one championship race in 1951 and had not competed at the previous rounds at Bern and Spa.

== Entries ==
No	Driver	Entrant	Constructor	Chassis	Engine	Tyre
2	(Italy) Nino Farina	Alfa Romeo SpA	Alfa Romeo	Alfa Romeo 159A	Alfa Romeo 1.5 L8s	P
4	(Argentina) Juan Manuel Fangio (Note: Juan Manuel Fangio qualified and drove 15 laps of the race in the #4 Alfa Romeo. Luigi Fagioli took over the car for a further 40 laps.)	Alfa Romeo SpA	Alfa Romeo	Alfa Romeo 159A	Alfa Romeo 1.5 L8s	P
6	(Italy) Consalvo Sanesi	Alfa Romeo SpA	Alfa Romeo	Alfa Romeo 159	Alfa Romeo 1.5 L8s	P
8	(Italy) Luigi Fagioli (Note: Luigi Fagioli qualified and drove 20 laps of the race in the #8 Alfa Romeo. Juan Manuel Fangio took over the car for the remaining 57 laps of the race. They shared the points for the win (Fangio scored one extra point for setting the fastest race lap).)	Alfa Romeo SpA	Alfa Romeo	Alfa Romeo 159B	Alfa Romeo 1.5 L8s	P
10	(Italy) Luigi Villoresi	Scuderia Ferrari	Ferrari	Ferrari 375	Ferrari Type 375 4.5 V12	E
12	(Italy) Alberto Ascari	Scuderia Ferrari	Ferrari	Ferrari 375	Ferrari Type 375 4.5 V12	E
14	(Argentina) José Froilán González (Note: José Froilán González qualified and drove 35 laps of the race in the #14 Ferrari. Alberto Ascari, whose own vehicle had already retired, took over the car for the remaining 42 laps of the race. They shared the points for 2nd position.)	Scuderia Ferrari	Ferrari	Ferrari 375	Ferrari Type 375 4.5 V12	E
16	(Italy) Piero Taruffi	Scuderia Ferrari	Ferrari	Ferrari 375	Ferrari 375 F1 4.5 V12	E
18	(Switzerland) Toulo de Graffenried	Enrico Platé	Maserati	Maserati 4CLT-50	Maserati 4 CL 1.5 L4s	P
20	(United States) Harry Schell	Enrico Platé	Maserati	Maserati 4CLT-48	Maserati 4 CL 1.5 L4s	P
22	(Thailand) Prince Bira	Ecurie Siam	Maserati	Maserati 4CLT-48	Maserati 4 CL 1.5 L4s	P
24	(United Kingdom) Peter Whitehead	Graham Whitehead	Ferrari	Ferrari 125	Ferrari 125 F1 1.5 V12s	D
26	(United Kingdom) Reg Parnell (Note: Reg Parnell qualified and drove the entire race in the #26 Ferrari. Brian Shawe-Taylor practiced in the car, but took no part in the race.)	G. A. Vandervell	Ferrari	Ferrari 375 tw	Ferrari Type 375 4.5 V12	P
28	(Belgium) Johnny Claes	Ecurie Belge	Talbot-Lago	Talbot-Lago T26C-DA	Talbot 23CV 4.5 L6	D
30	(France) Robert Manzon	Equipe Gordini	Simca-Gordini	Simca-Gordini T15	Simca-Gordini 15C 1.5 L4s	E
32	(France) Maurice Trintignant	Equipe Gordini	Simca-Gordini	Simca-Gordini T15	Simca-Gordini 15C 1.5 L4s	E
34	(France) André Simon	Equipe Gordini	Simca-Gordini	Simca-Gordini T15	Simca-Gordini 15C 1.5 L4s	E
36	(France) Aldo Gordini	Equipe Gordini	Simca-Gordini	Simca-Gordini T11	Simca-Gordini 15C 1.5 L4s	E
38	(France) Philippe Étancelin	Philippe Étancelin	Talbot-Lago	Talbot-Lago T26C-DA	Talbot 23CV 4.5 L6	D
40	(France) Louis Rosier	Ecurie Rosier	Talbot-Lago	Talbot-Lago T26C-DA	Talbot 23CV 4.5 L6	D
42	(Monaco) Louis Chiron	Ecurie Rosier	Talbot-Lago	Talbot-Lago T26C	Talbot 23CV 4.5 L6	D
44	(France) Eugène Chaboud (Note: Eugène Chaboud qualified and drove the entire race in the #44 Talbot-Lago. Lucien Vincent, named substitute driver for the car, was not used during the Grand Prix.)	Eugène Chaboud	Talbot-Lago	Talbot-Lago T26C-GS	Talbot 23CV 4.5 L6	D
46	(France) Yves Giraud-Cabantous	Yves Giraud-Cabantous	Talbot-Lago	Talbot-Lago T26C	Talbot 23CV 4.5 L6	D
48	(France) Guy Mairesse	Yves Giraud-Cabantous	Talbot-Lago	Talbot-Lago T26C	Talbot 23CV 4.5 L6	D
50	(Argentina) Onofre Marimón	Scuderia Milano	Maserati-Milano	Maserati 4CLT-50	Milano 1.5 L4s	P

== Classification ==
=== Qualifying ===
Pos	No	Driver	Constructor	Time
1	4	(Argentina) Juan Manuel Fangio	Alfa Romeo	2:25.7
2	2	(Italy) Nino Farina	Alfa Romeo	2:27.4
3	12	(Italy) Alberto Ascari	Ferrari	2:28.1
4	10	(Italy) Luigi Villoresi	Ferrari	2:28.5
5	6	(Italy) Consalvo Sanesi	Alfa Romeo	2:28.9
6	14	(Argentina) José Froilán González	Ferrari	2:30.8
7	8	(Italy) Luigi Fagioli	Alfa Romeo	2:33.1
8	42	(Monaco) Louis Chiron	Talbot-Lago-Talbot	2:43.7
9	26	(United Kingdom) Reg Parnell	Ferrari	2:44.0
10	38	(France) Philippe Étancelin	Talbot-Lago-Talbot	2:44.8
11	46	(France) Yves Giraud-Cabantous	Talbot-Lago-Talbot	2:45.7
12	28	(Belgium) Johnny Claes	Talbot-Lago-Talbot	2:46.6
13	40	(France) Louis Rosier	Talbot-Lago-Talbot	2:48.0
14	44	(France) Eugène Chaboud	Talbot-Lago-Talbot	2:49.6
15	50	(Argentina) Onofre Marimón	Maserati-Milano	2:49.9
16	18	(Switzerland) Toulo de Graffenried	Maserati	2:50.1
17	36	(France) Aldo Gordini	Simca-Gordini	2:50.3
18	32	(France) Maurice Trintignant	Simca-Gordini	2:50.4
19	48	(France) Guy Mairesse	Talbot-Lago-Talbot	2:58.4
20	24	(United Kingdom) Peter Whitehead	Ferrari	2:59.0
21	34	(France) André Simon	Simca-Gordini	2:59.5
22	20	(United States) Harry Schell	Maserati	3:02.0
23	30	(France) Robert Manzon	Simca-Gordini	3:06.0
DNA	16	(Italy) Piero Taruffi	Ferrari	–
DNA	22	(Thailand) Prince Bira	Maserati	–

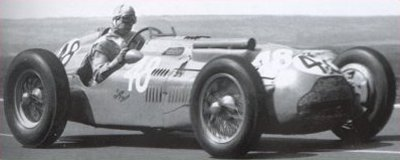
Guy Mairesse finished 9th in a Talbot-Lago T26C

=== Race ===
Pos	No	Driver	Constructor	Laps	Time/Retired	Grid	Points
1	8	(Italy) Luigi Fagioli	Alfa Romeo	77	3:22:11.0	7	4
1	8	(Argentina) Juan Manuel Fangio	Alfa Romeo	77	3:22:11.0	7	5^{1}
2	14	(Italy) Alberto Ascari	Ferrari	77	+ 58.2	6	3
2	14	(Argentina) José Froilán González	Ferrari	77	+ 58.2	6	3
3	10	(Italy) Luigi Villoresi	Ferrari	74	+ 3 Laps	4	4
4	26	(United Kingdom) Reg Parnell	Ferrari	73	+ 4 Laps	9	3
5	2	(Italy) Nino Farina	Alfa Romeo	73	+ 4 Laps	2	2
6	42	(Monaco) Louis Chiron	Talbot-Lago-Talbot	71	+ 6 Laps	8	
7	46	(France) Yves Giraud-Cabantous	Talbot-Lago-Talbot	71	+ 6 Laps	11	
8	44	(France) Eugène Chaboud	Talbot-Lago-Talbot	69	+ 8 Laps	14	
9	48	(France) Guy Mairesse	Talbot-Lago-Talbot	66	+ 11 Laps	19	
10	6	(Italy) Consalvo Sanesi	Alfa Romeo	58	+ 19 Laps	5	
11	4	(Italy) Luigi Fagioli	Alfa Romeo	55	+ 22 Laps	1	
11	4	(Argentina) Juan Manuel Fangio	Alfa Romeo	55	+ 22 Laps	1	
Ret	28	(Belgium) Johnny Claes	Talbot-Lago-Talbot	54	Accident	12	
Ret	40	(France) Louis Rosier	Talbot-Lago-Talbot	43	Transmission	13	
Ret	38	(France) Philippe Étancelin	Talbot-Lago-Talbot	37	Engine	10	
Ret	36	(France) Aldo Gordini	Simca-Gordini	27	Engine	17	
Ret	20	(United States) Harry Schell	Maserati	23	Overheating	22	
Ret	32	(France) Maurice Trintignant	Simca-Gordini	11	Engine	18	
Ret	12	(Italy) Alberto Ascari	Ferrari	10	Gearbox	3	
Ret	34	(France) André Simon	Simca-Gordini	7	Engine	21	
Ret	30	(France) Robert Manzon	Simca-Gordini	3	Engine	23	
Ret	50	(Argentina) Onofre Marimón	Maserati-Milano	2	Engine	15	
Ret	18	(Switzerland) Toulo de Graffenried	Maserati	1	Transmission	16	
Ret	24	(United Kingdom) Peter Whitehead	Ferrari	1	Engine	20	

Notes

- ^1 – Includes 1 point for fastest lap

== Championship standings after the race ==
Drivers' Championship standings

	Pos	Driver	Points
1	1	(Argentina) Juan Manuel Fangio	15
1	2	(Italy) Nino Farina	14
	3	(United States) Lee Wallard	9
	4	(Italy) Alberto Ascari	9
2	5	(Italy) Luigi Villoresi	8

- Note: Only the top five positions are listed. Only the best 4 results counted towards the Championship.

== Notes ==
Previous race: 1951 Belgian Grand Prix	FIA Formula One World Championship; 1951 season	Next race: 1951 British Grand Prix
Previous race: 1950 French Grand Prix	French Grand Prix	Next race: 1952 French Grand Prix
Previous race: 1950 British Grand Prix	European Grand Prix (Designated European Grand Prix)	Next race: 1952 Belgian Grand Prix
