= 1950 Dutch Grand Prix =

- Non-championship race in the 1950 Formula One season

Race details
- Date: 23 July 1950
- Official name: I Grote Prijs van Nederland
- Location: Zandvoort, Netherlands
- Course: Permanent racing facility
- Course length: 4.193 km (2.605 miles)
- Distance: 90 laps, 377.370 km (234.488 miles)

Pole position
Driver	(France) Raymond Sommer	Talbot-Lago
- Time: 1:51.8

Fastest lap
Driver	(France) Raymond Sommer	Talbot-Lago
- Time: 1:52.1

Podium
First	(France) Louis Rosier	Talbot-Lago
Second	(Italy) Luigi Villoresi	Ferrari
Third	(Italy) Alberto Ascari	Ferrari

The 1950 Dutch Grand Prix was a motor race held on 23 July 1950 at Circuit Park Zandvoort, Netherlands. It was the first Dutch Grand Prix open to Formula One cars. The race was won by French driver Louis Rosier in a Talbot-Lago.

== Classification ==
=== Qualifying ===
Pos	No	Driver	Constructor	Time	Gap
1	12	(France) Raymond Sommer	Talbot-Lago	1'51.8	-
2	2	(Argentina) Juan Manuel Fangio	Maserati	1'53.0	+1.2
3	4	(Argentina) José Froilán González	Maserati	1'54.7	+2.9
4	18	(France) Louis Rosier	Talbot-Lago	1'55.0	+3.2
5	6	(Italy) Luigi Villoresi	Ferrari	1'55.0	+3.2
6	20	(France) Yves Giraud-Cabantous	Talbot-Lago	1'55.2	+3.4
7	8	(Italy) Alberto Ascari	Ferrari	1:56.9	+5.1
8	24	(Thailand) Prince Bira	Maserati	1'57.4	+5.6
9	16	(France) Philippe Étançelin	Talbot-Lago	1'57.6	+5.8
10	26	(United Kingdom) Reg Parnell	Maserati	1'58.3	+6.5
11	10	(United Kingdom) Peter Whitehead	Ferrari	1'58.4	+6.6
12	14	(Belgium) Johnny Claes	Talbot-Lago	1'59.7	+7.9
13	22	(Switzerland) Enrico Platé	Maserati	2'01.4	+9.6
14	28	(United Kingdom) David Murray	Maserati	2'08.1	+16.3

=== Race ===
Pos	No	Driver	Constructor	Laps	Time/Retired	Grid
1	18	(France) Louis Rosier	Talbot-Lago	90	3:03'36.3	4
2	6	(Italy) Luigi Villoresi	Ferrari	90	+1'13.0	5
3	8	(Italy) Alberto Ascari	Ferrari	90	+1'13.5	7
4	10	(United Kingdom) Peter Whitehead	Ferrari	88	+2 Laps	11
5	24	(Thailand) Prince Bira	Maserati	87	+3 Laps	8
6	28	(United Kingdom) David Murray	Maserati	85	+5 Laps	14
7	4	(Argentina) José Froilán González	Maserati	84	+6 Laps	3
Ret	14	(Belgium) Johnny Claes	Talbot-Lago	77	Accident	12
Ret	16	(France) Philippe Étançelin	Talbot-Lago	60	Oil pipe	9
Ret	26	(United Kingdom) Reg Parnell	Maserati	42	Rear axle	10
Ret	12	(France) Raymond Sommer	Talbot-Lago	37	Clutch	1
Ret	2	(Argentina) Juan Manuel Fangio	Maserati	24	Suspension	2
Ret	20	(France) Yves Giraud-Cabantous	Talbot-Lago	20	Engine	6
Ret	22	(Switzerland) Enrico Platé	Maserati	1	Engine	13

Previous race: 1950 Albi Grand Prix	Formula One non-championship races 1950 season	Next race: 1950 Nations Grand Prix
Previous race: None; Previous race at the Circuit Zandvoort: 1949 Zandvoort Grand Prix	Dutch Grand Prix	Next race: 1951 Dutch Grand Prix
