= Peter Monkhouse =

British racing driver (1812–1950)

- Born: Peter Richard Monkhouse; 29 July 1912 Beaconsfield, England
- Died: 23 April 1950 (aged 37) Padua, Italy

Peter Richard Monkhouse (29 July 1912 – 23 April 1950) was an engineer and racing driver, active between 1932 and 1950.

== Career ==
A graduate of the University of Cambridge, Monkhouse's earliest racing appearance of note was at the 1932 Shelsley Walsh hillclimb in a 750cc special of his own construction. He o won the 850cc class of the 1935 Inter-Varsity Speed Trials at Syston Park, at the wheel of an Austin.

In 1935, he founded the Monaco Engineering garage in Watford, with which he became acquainted with a variety of fast cars; he entered an MG Magnette for the 1937 24 Hours of Le Mans, but the race was cancelled, so Monkhouse used it for hillclimbs and speed trials.

His sales manager was the racing driver Ian Connell, who entered the 1938 Donington Grand Prix in his E.R.A., and Monkhouse was named reserve driver. On lap 40 (just after half-distance), Connell came in for a refuelling stop, and stepped out of the car for Monkhouse to take over, putting a cushion behind him as he was shorter than Connell. At the time Connell was in 9th position, and Monkhouse safely brought the car home in 8th, gaining a place when Walter Bäumer retired.

It was Monkhouse's only national Grand Prix. During the Second World War, Monaco Motors built parts for airplane engines, and after the conflict Monkhouse set up a separate company to develop an engine for light aircraft; Monkhouse sold the company in 1949.

Monkhouse resumed racing after the war, taking part in the 1947 Jersey Road Race, which was run to Formula One regulations, sharing his Bugatti Type 51A with Michael Chorlton to an early retirement. He finished 2nd to B. Bira in the Bugatti at the 1947 Grand Prix des Frontières a fortnight later. Soon afterwards Monkhouse was involved in a road accident in the Bugatti and both driver and car were seriously injured.

Monkhouse recovered enough to race an MG sportscar to fifth place in a race at Lyon in September, and he finally made his Le Mans debut in the 1949 event, finishing 10th with Ernest Stapleton in an Aston Martin. The same year he also made his first start in the Monte Carlo Rally, driving a 1,180cc Sunbeam-Talbot and winning a special award, and in the Mille Miglia.

== Death ==
Monkhouse was killed in the 1950 Mille Miglia, when co-driver Philip A. H. Wood lost control of their Healey Silverstone between Vicenza and Padua and the car fell 50 meters down an embankment; Wood eventually recovered from his injuries but Monkhouse died a few hours after the accident.

== Personal life ==
Monkhouse was twice married; his second wife (née Eileen Cantey) had raced MGs before the war. He was not related to the contemporary motor racing photographer George Monkhouse.

== Results ==
- Sportscars
