= Benoît Musy =

Swiss motorcycle road racer and race car driver (1917–1956)

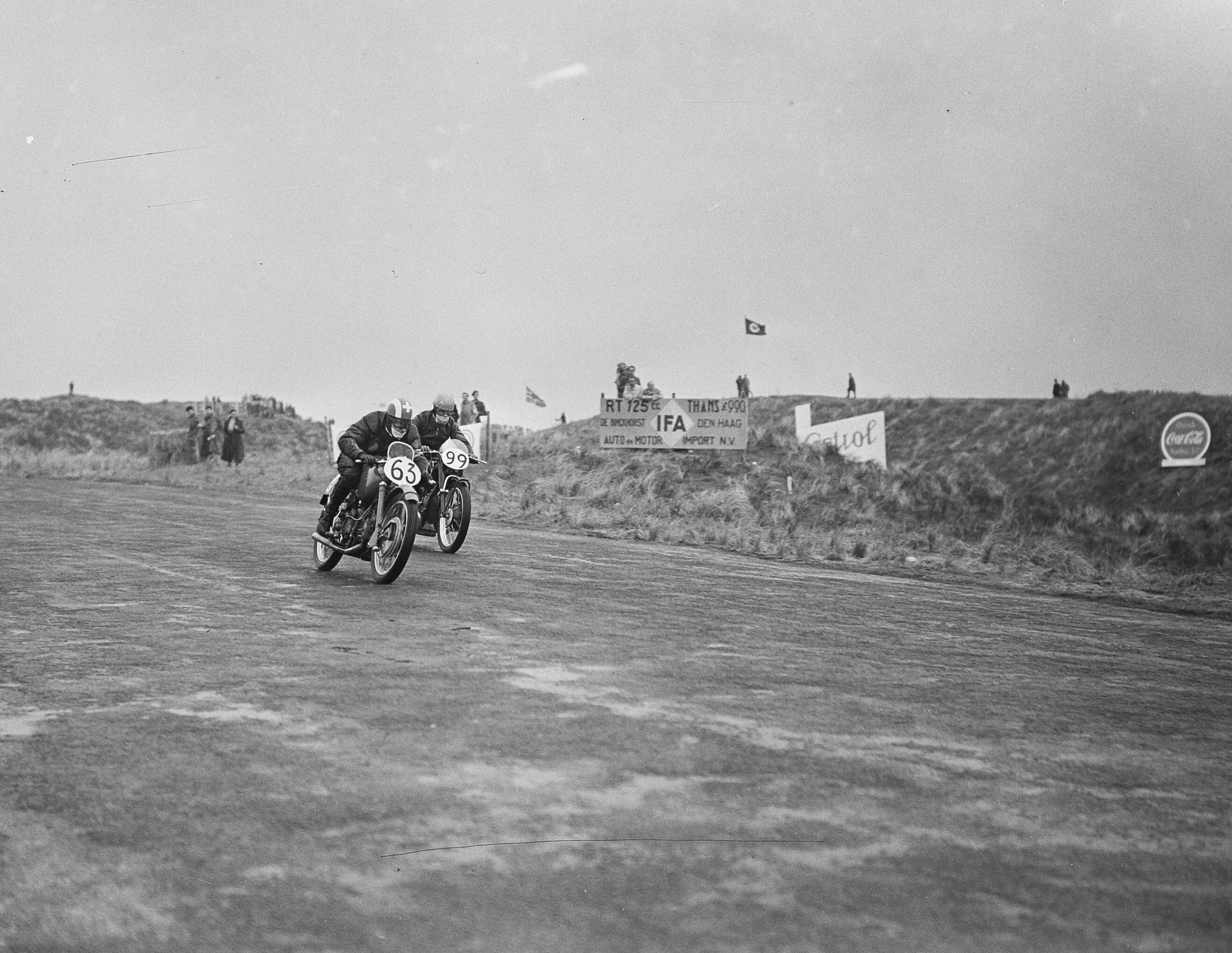
- Musy racing Piet Knijnenburg in 1950
- Nationality: (Switzerland) Swiss
Motorcycle racing career statistics
Grand Prix motorcycle racing
Active years	1949 - 1951
First race	1949 250cc Swiss motorcycle Grand Prix
Last race	1951 500cc Swiss Grand Prix
Team	Moto Guzzi
Starts / Wins / Podiums / Poles / F. laps / Points; 4 / 0 / 0 / 0 / 0 / 8.5

Benoît Nicolas Musy (13 December 1917 – 7 October 1956) was a Swiss Grand Prix motorcycle road racer and Maserati race car driver.

== Biography ==
Musy was born on 13 December 1917 in Bern, Switzerland, the son of the Swiss president Jean-Marie Musy. He received an agriculture engineering degree from L'institut agricole de l'État de Fribourg in Grangeneuve / FR - Switzerland, and served in the air force during the Swiss military mobilisation World War II. During 1945, he rescued a large number (1,200) of Jews from the concentration camp Theresienstadt with his father. He also received one of the first Swiss parachute jumper licenses in 1947.

=== Motorcycle racing ===
Musy acquired further fame as a motorcycle racer, winning six Swiss championships with Moto Guzzi motorcycles. He also competed in the 1949 Swiss motorcycle Grand Prix, part of the inaugural Grand Prix motorcycle racing season. He competed in three more Swiss motorcycle Grand Prix races, finishing as high as fourth place.

=== Automobile racing ===
Musy later moved to racing cars. He had various ones, all Maserati. Musy started in May 1954, with a 1953 Maserati A6 or A6GCS (#2040), a Maserati factory race car, formerly used by Giletti, the official Maserati pilot. With this car he has won several races, including some record laps, on different tracks. He sold the car in 1955 to Pietro Pagliarini.

At that time, Musy was already part of the semi-official Maserati racing team. He took part of several races, with very little success, in a 150, 200S, and 200Si. He even participated at a race in Dakar in a 250; he failed to finish.

After a test drive in the Swedish Grand Prix, Musy bought a Maserati 300S (#3057) in 1955, with which he earned several podium results.

Musy died in a racing event at Autodrome de Montlhéry, France, on 7 October 1956, crashing a factory Maserati 200S (#2047) over an embankment, after a steering column breakdown. Ejected from the car, he died immediately.

In total, Musy attended eleven mid-1950s European sports car championships, of which he won five.

== Auto racing results ==
Year	Position	Racetrack - Country	Car
1954	1st	Circuit de Spa-Francorchamps (Belgium)	Maserati 2000cc A6GCS
1954	4th	Aquila racetrack (Switzerland)	Maserati 2000cc
1954	1st	Megève racetrack best time ever (France)	Maserati 2000cc
1954	2nd	Senigallia racetrack (Italy)	Maserati 2000cc
1954	2nd	Senigallia racetrack (Italy)	Maserati 2000cc
1954	2nd	Circuit Park Zandvoort (Netherland)	Maserati 2000cc
1954	2nd	Circuit Bremgarten Swiss Grand-Prix	Maserati 2000cc
1954	2nd	Kandersteg racetrack (Switzerland)	Maserati 2000cc
1954	1st	Autodrome de Linas-Montlhéry (France)	Maserati 2000cc
1954	1st	Circuit de Spa-Francorchamps (Belgium)	Maserati 2000cc
1955	1st	Grand Prix des Frontières (Chimay Street Circuit) (Belgium)	Maserati 3000cc 300S
1955	4th	Porto Grand Prix (Monsanto Park) (Portugal)	Maserati 3000cc
1955	2nd	Messina 10 h night race (Italy)	Masearti 3000cc
1955	1st	Karlskoga – Kanonloppet (Sweden)	Maserati 3000cc
1956	1st	first heat Oulton Park best time ever (UK)	Maserati 3000 cc
1956	1st	Grand Prix des Frontières (Chimay Street Circuit) (Belgium)	Maserati 3000cc
1956	4th	Bari Grand Prix (Italy)	Maserati 3000 cc
1956	1st	Sables-d'Olonne Grand-Prix (France)	Maserati 3000 cc
