= Chimay Street Circuit =

Street circuit in Belgium

Circuit de Chimay
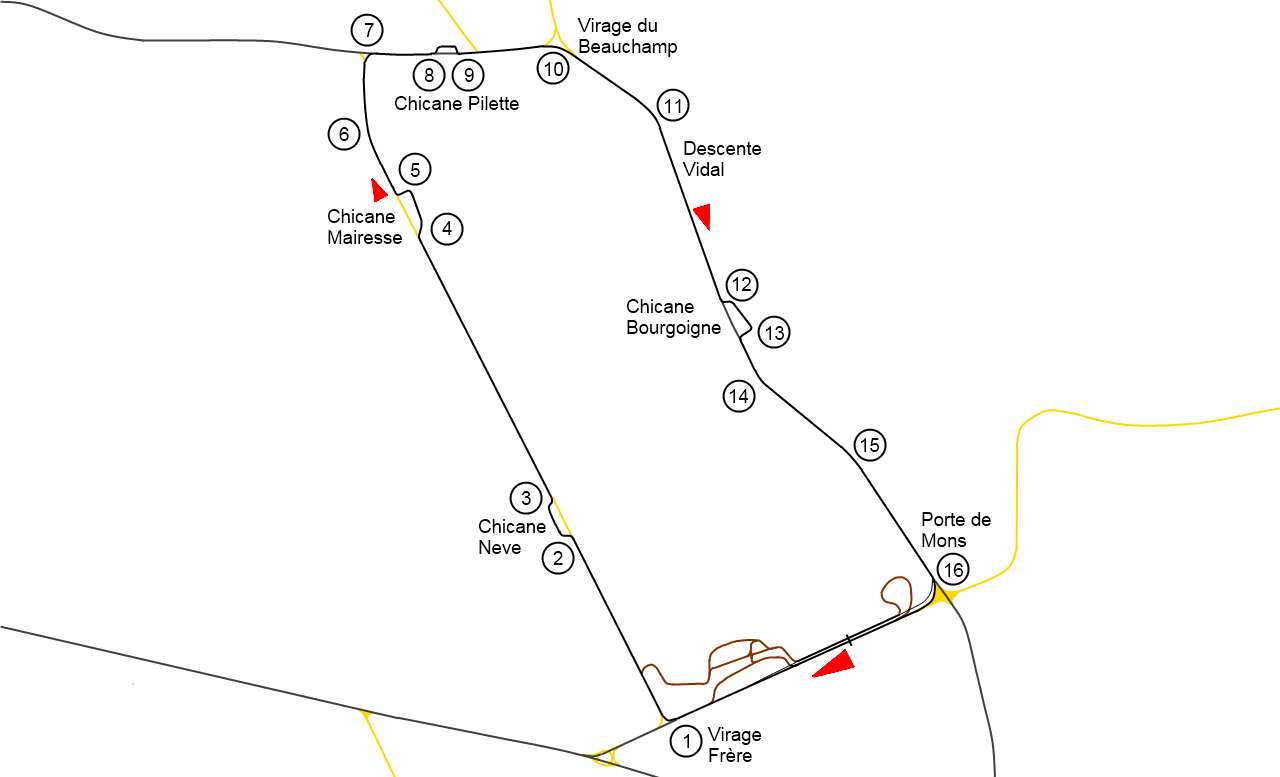
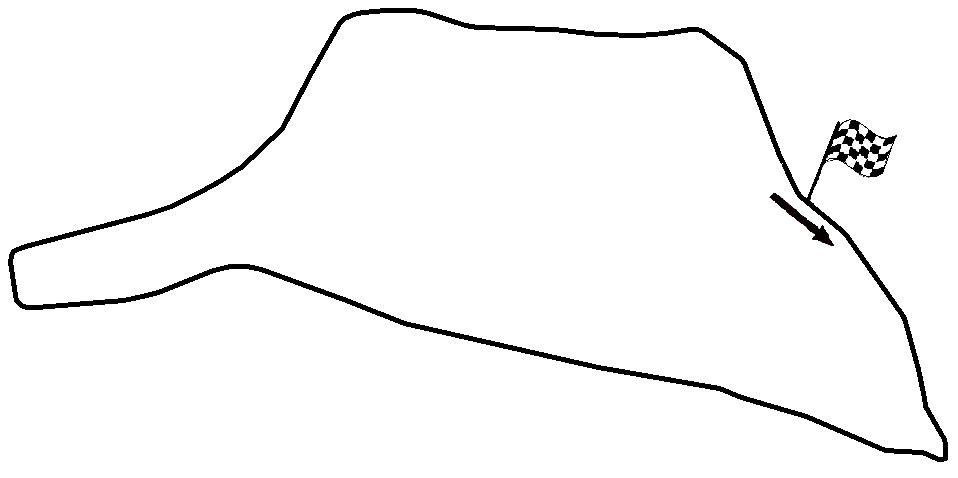
- Modern layout of Chimay Street Circuit (1995–2007, 2009–present) Layout of Chimay Street Circuit used in Grand Prix des Frontières (1926–1938, 1946–1974)
- Location: Chimay, Wallonia, Belgium
- Coordinates: 50°03′38″N 4°17′03″E
- Opened: 1926
- Major events: Current: International Road Racing Championship (2010–present); Former: Grand Prix des Frontières (1926–1939, 1946–1963, 1965–1972)
- Website: https://circuit.be/

Modern Circuit (1995–2007, 2009–present)
- Length: 4.520 km (2.809 mi)
- Turns: 23

Shortened Original Circuit (1975–1994, 2008)
- Length: 9.500 km (5.903 mi)
- Turns: 26

Original Grand Prix Circuit (1926–1938, 1946–1974)
- Length: 10.450 km (6.493 mi)
- Turns: 21
- Race lap record: 3:12.600 ( (Belgium) Yvo Grauls, Chevrolet Camaro, 1972, Group 2)

The Chimay Street Circuit (also known as Circuit de Chimay) was a street circuit in Chimay, Belgium used during the Grand Prix des Frontières between 1926 and 1972, when the event was discontinued due to safety reasons. The course length was 10.450 km (6.493 mi).

In 1975, a shorter 9.500 km (5.903 mi) version of the Chimay Street Circuit was used in races for classic motorcycles.

== Layout ==
The most southern corner and at the same time the slowest corner in the course borders the town of Chimay. A long straight leads to the town of Salles. Passing the church of Chlle de Arbrisseau, the most northern point is reached - the town of Thiérissart - before turning back south down the main straight.

== Lap records ==
The fastest official race lap records of the Chimay Street Circuit are listed as:

Category	Time	Driver	Vehicle	Event
Original Grand Prix Circuit (1926–1938, 1946–1974): 10.450 km (6.493 mi)
Group 2	3:12.600	Yvo Grauls	Chevrolet Camaro	1972 Chimay Touring Car race
Formula Two	3:15.400	David Purley (Note: Both drivers took the same lap time in this race independently.); Pierre-François Rousselot	Ensign LNF3; GRD 372	1960 Grand Prix des Frontières
Formula Two	3:22.400	Lucien Bianchi	Cooper T51	1960 Grand Prix des Frontières
Formula Junior	3:32.200	Jacques Maglia	Lotus 22	1963 Grand Prix des Frontières
Group 4	3:43.800	Mike Taylor	Lotus 15	1959 Grand Prix des Frontières
Sports car racing	3:46.600	Brian Naylor	Lotus Eleven	1957 Grand Prix des Frontières
Sports prototype	3:51.000	Benoît Musy	Maserati 300S	1956 Grand Prix des Frontières
Formula One	3:58.000	Jacques Pollet	Gordini T16	1954 Grand Prix des Frontières
Sports 2000	4:08.000	Roger Laurent	Ferrari 500 TR	1956 Grand Prix des Frontières
Formula Libre	4:37.000	Prince Bira	Maserati 4CL	1947 Grand Prix des Frontières
GP	4:47.000	Leonhard Joa	Maserati 6CM	1939 Grand Prix des Frontières
Voiturette	5:01.000	Willy Longueville	Bugatti T35B	1933 Grand Prix des Frontières
Cyclecar	6:09.200	Guy d'Havrincourt	Salmson GP	1927 Grand Prix des Frontières
