= Guy Mairesse =

French racing driver (1910–1954)

- Born: 10 August 1910; Warmeriville, Marne
- Died: 24 April 1954 (aged 43); Montlhéry, Essonne

Formula One World Championship career
- Nationality: (France) French
- Active years: 1950-1951
- Team: non-works Talbot-Lago
- Entries: 3
- Championships: 0
- Wins: 0
- Podiums: 0
- Career points: 0
- Pole positions: 0
- Fastest laps: 0
- First entry: 1950 Italian Grand Prix
- Last entry: 1951 French Grand Prix

Guy Mairesse (10 August 1910 – 24 April 1954) was a French racing driver. He participated in three Formula One World Championship Grands Prix, debuting on 3 September 1950. He scored no championship points.

Mairesse built a haulage business during the interwar period, and became interested in motor sport in 1946 through his friendship with Le Mans driver, Paul Vallée. He won the Lyon-Charbonnières Rally in 1947 and then purchased a Delahaye from Vallée for 1948, with which he was victorious at Chimay.

In 1949, Mairesse joined Vallée's team, Ecurie France, to race the Talbot-Lago and took fourth place at Pau and fifth at Albi. In 1950, he finished second at Le Mans with Pierre Meyrat using a single seat Talbot. Towards the end of that season the Vallée team closed and Mairesse purchased the Le Mans car and a Talbot-Lago T26C, which he used to enter the 1950 Italian Grand Prix, from which he retired, and the Swiss and French Grands Prix in 1951, finishing 11 laps down and "not classified" on both occasions. Thereafter his business commitments curtailed his involvement in racing and he sold his cars in 1952 appearing infrequently in other owners' machinery.

Mairesse was killed in practice for the Coupe de Paris at Montlhéry in 1954, when he swerved to avoid another car and crashed into a concrete wall.

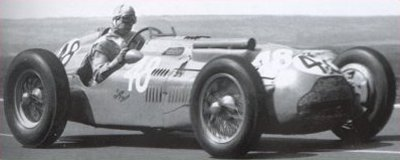
Mairesse at 1951 French Grand Prix in Talbot-Lago T26C

== Racing record ==
=== Complete Formula One World Championship results ===
(key)

Year	Entrant	Chassis	Engine	1	2	3	4	5	6	7	8	WDC	Pts
1950	Guy Mairesse	Talbot-Lago T26C	Talbot 23CV 4.5 L6	GBR	MON	500	SUI	BEL	FRA	ITA; Ret		NC	0
1951	Yves Giraud-Cabantous	Talbot-Lago T26C	Talbot 23CV 4.5 L6	SUI; 14	500	BEL	FRA; 9	GBR	GER	ITA	ESP	NC	0
