= Talbot-Lago T26C =

Formula One race car

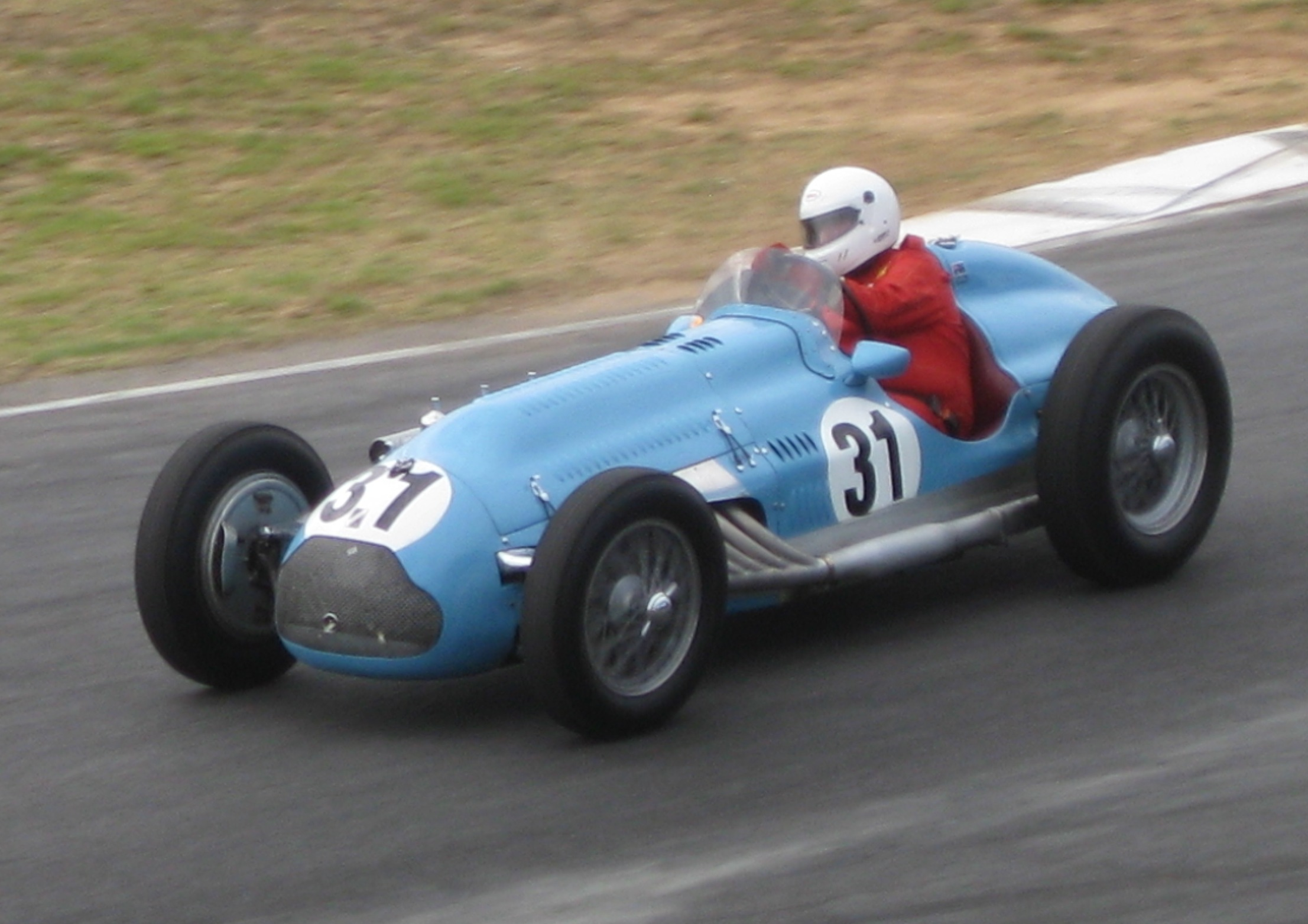
- Designer: Talbot-Lago
- Production: 1948–1950

Technical specifications
- Chassis: Steel box-section frame, aluminium body
- Suspension (front): wishbones, transverse leaf spring, friction shock absorbers
- Suspension (rear): live axle, semi-elliptic leaf springs, friction shock absorbers
- Length: 4,077 mm (160.5 in)
- Width: 1,308 mm (51.5 in)
- Axle track: 1,372 mm (54.0 in) (front); 1,308 mm (51.5 in) (rear)
- Wheelbase: 2,502 mm (98.5 in)
- Engine: 4.5 L (270 cu in) OHV I6 (260 bhp) FR layout
- Transmission: Wilson pre-selector 4-speed manual transmission
- Weight: 950 kg (2,090 lb)

Competition history
- Notable drivers: (France) Louis Rosier (France) Yves Giraud-Cabantous (France) Philippe Étancelin
- Debut: 1950 British Grand Prix
Races	Wins	Poles	F/Laps
13	0	0	0
- Constructors' Championships: 0 (Note that the Constructors' Championship was first awarded in 1958)
- Drivers' Championships: 0
- Unless otherwise stated, all data refer to Formula One World Championship Grands Prix only.

The Talbot-Lago T26C was a single-seater racing car designed and developed by French manufacturer Talbot-Lago. It featured a box section chassis, an unsupercharged 4,483 cc (273.6 cu in) capacity 93 mm × 110 mm (3.66 in × 4.33 in) straight-six engine and a four speed Wilson preselector gearbox. The chassis and gearbox were derived from the company's 1930s racing cars and were similar to those used on their post-war road cars. For the 1950 Formula One season a version with a more powerful engine was introduced, with revised carburation and twin spark plugs. These variants are known as T26C-DA (for Double Allume, i.e. twin plug).

== Racing history ==
The T26C made its racing debut in the 1948 Monaco Grand Prix, finishing second in the hands of Louis Chiron. Grand Prix victories were achieved the following year with Louis Rosier winning the 1949 Belgian Grand Prix and Louis Chiron winning the 1949 French Grand Prix.

A modified version, the T26C-GS (for Grand Sport), fitted with two-seater bodywork, cycle wings and lights, won the 1950 24 Hours of Le Mans driven by Louis Rosier and Jean-Louis Rosier.

Doug Whiteford won the 1952 and 1953 Australian Grand Prix driving a Talbot-Lago T26C.

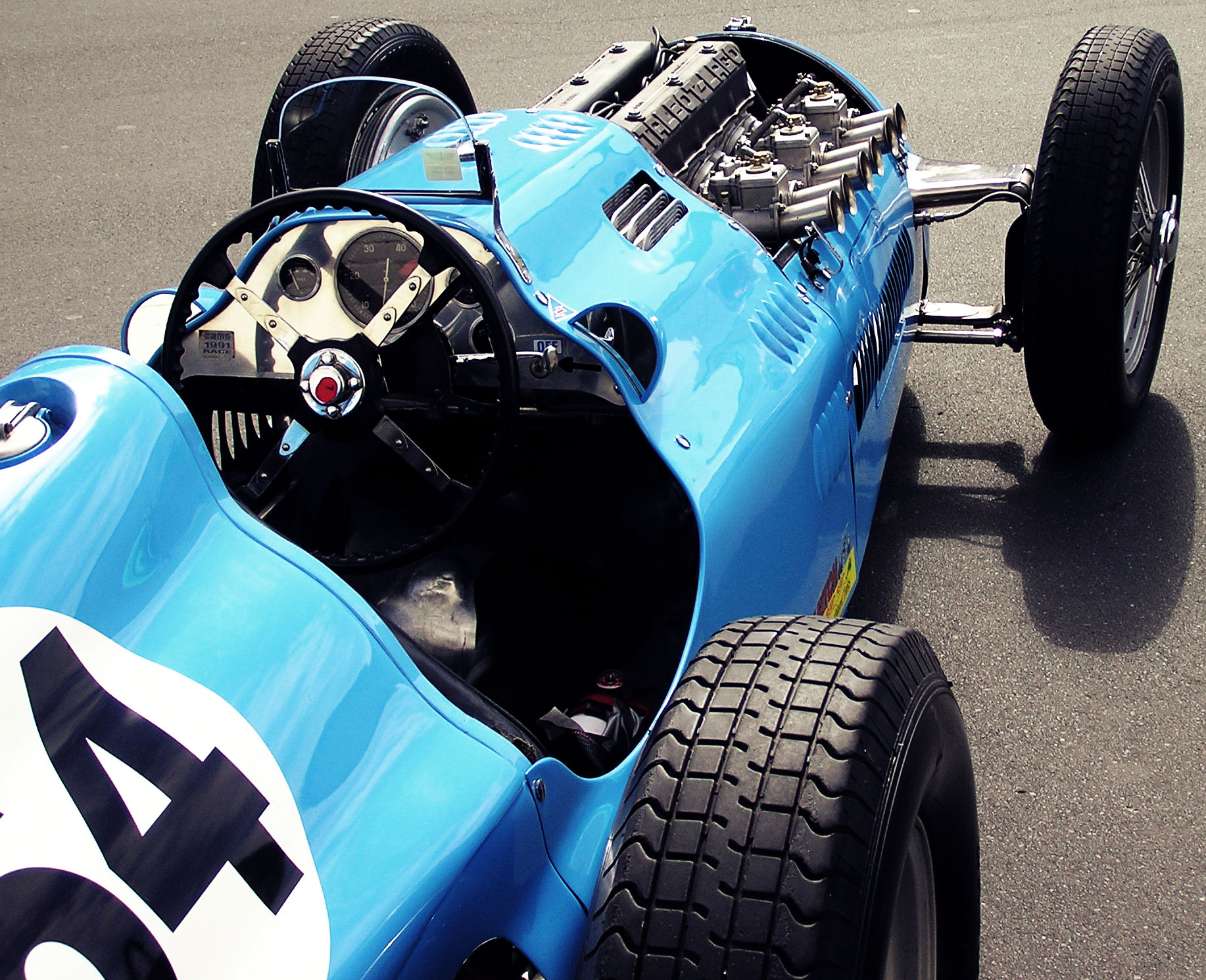
Talbot-Lago T26C de 1950.

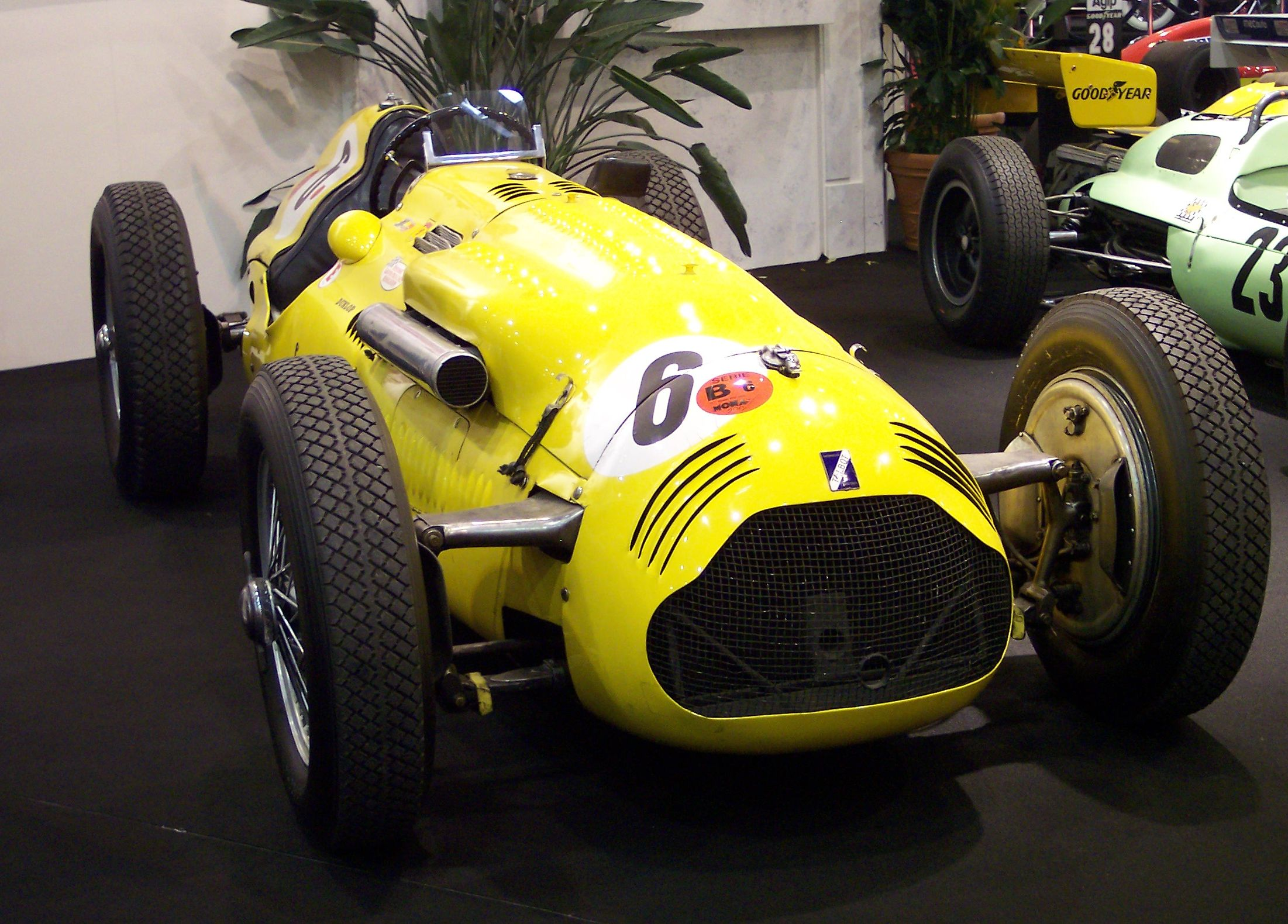
Talbot F1

== Technical data ==
Technical data	T26C (F1)
Engine:	Front mounted 6-cylinder in-line engine
Displacement:	4482 cm³
Bore x stroke:	93 x 110 mm
Max power at rpm:	260 hp at 5 000 rpm
Valve control:	2 camshafts in the engine block, 2 push rod actuated valves per cylinder
Compression:	11.0:1
Carburetor:	3 Zenith 50 HN
Gearbox:	4-speed Wilson preselector box
Suspension front:	Double cross links, transverse leaf springs
Suspension rear:	Rigid rear axle, longitudinal leaf springs
Brakes:	Hydraulic drum brakes
Chassis & body:	Steel box beam frame with aluminum body
Wheelbase:	250 cm
Dry weight:	950 kg
Top speed:	270 km/h

== Complete Formula One World Championship results ==
=== Works team entries ===
(key)

Year	Chassis	Engine	Driver	1	2	3	4	5	6	7
1950	T26C-DA	Talbot L6		GBR	MON	500	SUI	BEL	FRA	ITA
1950	T26C-DA	Talbot L6	(France) Yves Giraud-Cabantous	4	DNA		Ret	Ret	8	
1950	T26C-DA	Talbot L6	(France) Eugene Martin	Ret			Ret			
1950	T26C-DA	Talbot L6	(France) Louis Rosier				3	3	6*	
1950	T26C-DA	Talbot L6	(France) Philippe Étancelin					Ret		
1950	T26C-DA	Talbot L6	(France) Raymond Sommer						Ret	

* Indicates shared drive with Charles Pozzi in his privately entered T26C

n.b. Prior to 1958 there was no Constructor's World Championship, hence constructors were not awarded points.

=== Results of other Talbot-Lago cars ===
(key) (Results in bold indicate pole position; results in italics indicate fastest lap.)

Year	Entrant	Chassis	Engine	Driver	1	2	3	4	5	6	7	8
1950	Ecurie Rosier	T26C	Talbot L6		GBR	MON	500	SUI	BEL	FRA	ITA	
1950	Ecurie Rosier	T26C	Talbot L6	(France) Louis Rosier	5	Ret					4	
1950	Ecurie Rosier	T26C	Talbot L6	(France) Henri Louveau							Ret	
1950	Ecurie Rosier	T26C	Talbot L6	(France) Charles Pozzi		DNA						
1950	private	T26C	Talbot L6	(France) Charles Pozzi						6*		
1950	private	T26C	Talbot L6	(France) Raymond Sommer					Ret		Ret	
1950	private	T26C	Talbot L6	(France) Pierre Levegh		DNA			7	Ret	Ret	
1950	private	T26C	Talbot L6	(France) Guy Mairesse							Ret	
1950	Ecurie Belge	T26C	Talbot L6	(Belgium) Johnny Claes	11	7		10	8	Ret	Ret	
1950	Ecurie Bleue	T26C	Talbot L6	(United States) Harry Schell				8				
1950	Ecurie Leutitia	T26C	Talbot L6	(France) Eugene Chaboud					Ret			
1950	Philippe Étancelin	T26C	Talbot L6	(France) Eugene Chaboud						5*		
1950	Philippe Étancelin	T26C; T26C-DA	Talbot L6	(France) Philippe Étancelin	8	Ret		Ret		5*	5	
1951	Ecurie Rosier	T26C; T26C-DA; T26C-GS	Talbot L6		SUI	500	BEL	FRA	GBR	GER	ITA	ESP
1951	Ecurie Rosier	T26C; T26C-DA; T26C-GS	Talbot L6	(France) Louis Rosier	9		4	Ret	10	8	7	7
1951	Ecurie Rosier	T26C; T26C-DA; T26C-GS	Talbot L6	(Monaco) Louis Chiron			Ret	6	Ret	Ret	Ret	Ret
1951	Ecurie Belge	T26C; T26C-DA; T26C-GS	Talbot L6	(Belgium) Johnny Claes	13		7	Ret	13	11	Ret	Ret
1951	Ecurie Belgique	T26C; T26C-DA; T26C-GS	Talbot L6	(Belgium) Jacques Swaters						10	Ret	
1951	Ecurie Belgique	T26C; T26C-DA; T26C-GS	Talbot L6	(Belgium) André Pilette			6					
1951	private	T26C; T26C-DA; T26C-GS	Talbot L6	(France) Yves Giraud-Cabantous	Ret		5	7		Ret	8	Ret
1951	private	T26C; T26C-DA; T26C-GS	Talbot L6	(France) Philippe Étancelin	10		Ret	Ret		Ret		8
1951	private	T26C; T26C-DA; T26C-GS	Talbot L6	(France) Guy Mairesse	14			9				
1951	private	T26C; T26C-DA; T26C-GS	Talbot L6	(France) Eugene Chaboud				8				
1951	private	T26C; T26C-DA; T26C-GS	Talbot L6	(France) Henri Louveau	Ret							
1951	private	T26C; T26C-DA; T26C-GS	Talbot L6	(France) Pierre Levegh			8			9	Ret	
1951	private	T26C; T26C-DA; T26C-GS	Talbot L6	(United Kingdom) Duncan Hamilton					12	Ret		
1951	private	T26C; T26C-DA; T26C-GS	Talbot L6	(Argentina) José Froilán González	Ret							
1951	private	T26C; T26C-DA; T26C-GS	Talbot L6	(France) Georges Grignard								Ret

* Indicates shared drive
