= Yves Giraud-Cabantous =

French racing driver (1903–1973)

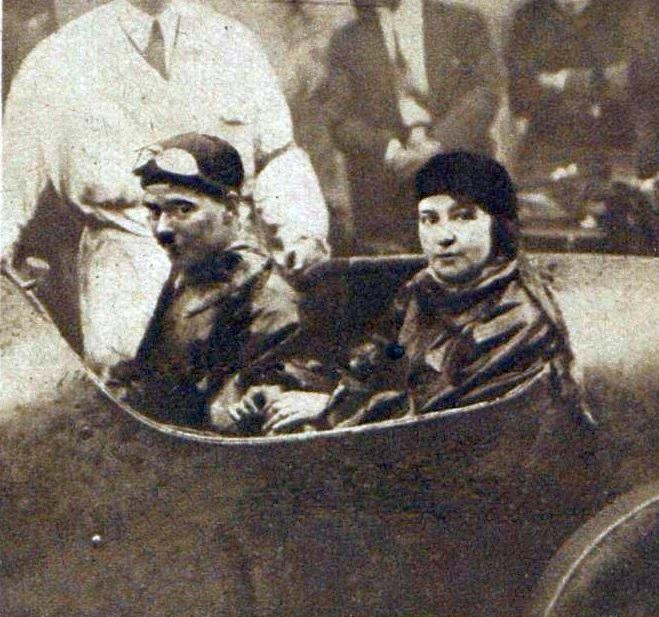
- Giraud-Cabantous in 1929
- Born: 8 October 1903; 14th arrondissement of Paris, France
- Died: 30 March 1973 (aged 69); Paris, France

Formula One World Championship career
- Nationality: (France) French
- Active years: 1950 – 1953
- Team(s): Talbot-Lago, HWM
- Entries: 13
- Championships: 0
- Wins: 0
- Podiums: 0
- Career points: 5
- Pole positions: 0
- Fastest laps: 0
- First entry: 1950 British Grand Prix
- Last entry: 1953 Italian Grand Prix

Yves Aristide Marius Giraud-Cabantous (French pronunciation: [iv ʒi.ʁo ka.bɑ̃.tu]; 8 October 1903 – 30 March 1973) was a racing driver from France. He drove in Formula One from 1950 to 1953, participating in 13 World Championship Grands Prix, plus numerous non-Championship Formula One and Formula Two races.

== Career ==
Giraud-Cabantous was born in the 14th arrondissement of Paris. He drove a Talbot-Lago-Talbot in 10 Championship races in 1950 and 1951, and his final three events were in an HWM-Alta. He amassed a total of 5 Championship points, three at the 1950 British Grand Prix (also his highest finish, a fourth place) and two at the 1951 Belgian Grand Prix. He died in Paris, aged 68, and is buried at Ivry Cemetery, Ivry-sur-Seine.

Giraud-Cabantous also competed in sports car racing, winning the 1930 Bol D'Or and finishing second at the 1938 24 Hours of Le Mans and at the 1953 12 Hours of Reims.

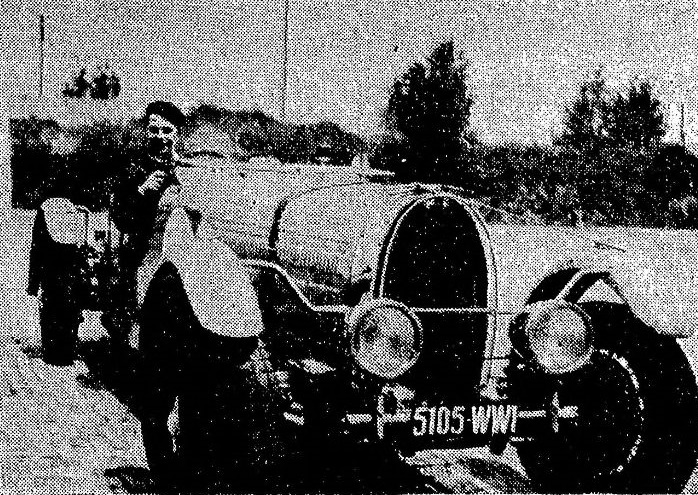
Giraud-Cabantous before the 1936 24 Hours of Spa

== Racing record ==
=== Complete 24 Hours of Le Mans results ===
Year	Team	Co-Drivers	Car	Class	Laps	Pos.	Class Pos.
1931	(France) Roger Labric	(France) Roger Labric	Caban Spéciale	1.1	89	DNF (Engine)	
1932	(France) Roger Labric	(France) Roger Labric	Caban Spéciale	1.5	146	9th	5th
1937	(France) Yves Giraud-Cabantous	(France) Charles Rigoulot	Chenard et Walcker Z1	1.1	151	DNF (Electrics)	
1938	(France) Gaston Serraud	(France) Gaston Serraud	Delahaye 135CS	5.0	233	**2nd**	**2nd**
1939	(France) Ecurie Francia	(France) Eugène Chaboud	Delahaye 135CS	5.0	99	DNF	
1949	(France) Louis Villeneuve	(France) Marius Chanal	Delahaye 135CS	5.0	128	DNF (Engine/fire)	
1950	(France) Automobiles Talbot	(France) Eugène Martin	Talbot-Lago T26GS	5.0	-	DNA	
1952	(United Kingdom) Donald Healey Motor Company	(France) Pierre Veyron	Nash-Healey	5.0	(3hrs)	DNF (Engine)	
1953	(United Kingdom) Nash-Healey Inc.	(France) Pierre Veyron	Nash-Healey	5.0	9	DNF (Engine)	
1954	(France) Automobiles VP	(France) Just-Emile Vernet	VP 166R	S 750	190	DNF (Accident)	
1955	(France) Automobiles VP	(France) Yves Lesur	VP 166R	S 750	26	DNF (Engine)	

=== Formula One World Championship results ===
(key) (Races in bold indicate pole position; races in italics indicate fastest lap)

Year	Entrant	Chassis	Engine	1	2	3	4	5	6	7	8	9	WDC	Pts.
1950	Automobiles Talbot-Darracq	Talbot-Lago T26C-DA	Talbot L6	GBR; 4	MON; DNA	500	SUI; Ret	BEL; Ret	FRA; 8	ITA			14th	3
1951	Yves Giraud Cabantous	Talbot-Lago T26C	Talbot L6	SUI; Ret	500	BEL; 5	FRA; 7	GBR	GER; Ret	ITA; 8	ESP; Ret		18th	2
1952	HW Motors	HWM 52	Alta L4	SUI	500	BEL	FRA; 10	GBR	GER	NED	ITA		NC	0
1953	HW Motors	HWM 53	Alta L4	ARG	500	NED	BEL	FRA; 14	GBR	GER	SUI	ITA; 15	NC	0

== Sources ==
- Formula One World Championship results are derived from "The Official Formula 1 website". Archived from the original on 2015-02-24.
