= Ernő Festetics =

Hungarian aristocrat and racing driver (1915–1957)

- Born: Mária József Ernő Festetics von Tolna; 15 October 1915 Budapest, Hungary
- Died: 1957

Count Mária József Ernő Festetics von Tolna (15 October 1915 – 1957) was a Hungarian aristocrat and Grand Prix racing driver.

== Career ==
Festetics was from a notable Hungarian family, and his father Sándor Festetics had served as Minister of Defence. Festetics took part in a number of sports, and, thanks to an income from the family estate, he undertook started motor racing in the late 1930s; originally with a Ford, but in 1937 stepped up in quality by buying a 3 year old Maserati 8CM from Ecurie Braillard. Festetics painted the car in the Hungarian national colours of red, white, and green, and undertook a number of events in the 1937 Grand Prix season. His entries included two national Grands Prix, finishing 10th at the 1937 German Grand Prix (aged just 21) and 8th at the 1937 Czech Grand Prix. He also set Hungarian speed records in the car for the flying mile and kilometer.

The car however was uncompetitive and in 1938 he bought a BMW 328 in order to take part in sportscar racing. His only Grand Prix appearance of the year was a brief one, crashing in practice for the 1938 German Grand Prix driving an Alfa Romeo.

== Later life ==
Festetics left Hungary during the Second World War and died in 1957, aged 41.

== Complete European Championship results ==
(key) (Races in bold indicate pole position) (Races in italics indicate fastest lap)

Year	Entrant	Chassis	Engine	1	2	3	4	5	EDC	Pts
1937	private	Maserati 6CM	Maserati 1.5l inline-6	BEL	GER; 10	MON	SUI	ITA	20th=	36
1938	private	Alfa Romeo P3	Alfa Romeo 3.8l inline-8	FRA	GER; DNS	SUI	ITA		36th=	32
