= 1937 Grand Prix season =

Fifth AIACR European Championship season

1937 AIACR European Championship

Seasons
- ← 1936 1938 →

1937 Grand Prix season

Seasons
- ← 1936 1938 →

The 1937 Grand Prix season was the fifth AIACR European Championship season. The championship was won by Rudolf Caracciola, driving for the Mercedes-Benz team. Caracciola won three of the five events that counted towards the championship, despite not taking part in the first race, the Belgian GP, as he and many other drivers of the German teams and Alfa's Scuderia Ferrari preferred to race in the US a week earlier for the Vanderbilt Cup.

Due to the scoring system which basically added up podium finishes with 1 to 3 points, while covering over 75% of a race distance added 4 points, any absence lowered championships chances significantly as the maximum of 8 points was added.

In 1934, rules were introduced that allowed unlimited engines as long as the car weight was below 750 kg. Starting at around 300hp in 1934, the cars gained power each season. 1937 saw the most powerful Grand Prix cars so far, with the Mercedes-Benz W125 supercharged 5.6L inline-8 engines boasting nearly 650 bhp, and the Auto Union Type C V16 well over 500 hp. Considering that an average saloon car produced around 25 bhp at the time, the performance of these single-seaters was extremely high compared with any other season in modern motorsport; so much so that regulations were put in force for the following year to limit the engine capacity to reduce their power and to add weight to the cars to make them slower.

The development, construction and operation of the German race cars and race tracks was supported by subsidies from the German governments of the time, with Italy and France making similar efforts (Tripoli Grand Prix, S.E.F.A.C., Million Franc Race). The amount of power of the supercharged Mercedes-Benz W125 was not equalled in circuit racing cars until large American V8 engines powered Can–Am cars in the late 1960s, and European Grand Prix cars did not have this kind of power again until the early 1980s 1.5 liter turbocharged engines, a span of nearly 45 years, when Grand Prix racing had long since become Formula One.

== Teams and drivers ==
The following teams and drivers competed in the 1937 AIACR European Championship.

Entrant	Constructor	Chassis	Engine	Driver	Rounds
(Germany) Daimler-Benz AG	Mercedes-Benz	W125	Mercedes-Benz M125 5.7 L8 s	(Germany) Hermann Lang	1-2, 4-5
(Germany) Daimler-Benz AG	Mercedes-Benz	W125	Mercedes-Benz M125 5.7 L8 s	(Germany) Manfred von Brauchitsch	All
(Germany) Daimler-Benz AG	Mercedes-Benz	W125	Mercedes-Benz M125 5.7 L8 s	(Switzerland) Christian Kautz	All
(Germany) Daimler-Benz AG	Mercedes-Benz	W125	Mercedes-Benz M125 5.7 L8 s	(Germany) Rudolf Caracciola	2-5
(Germany) Daimler-Benz AG	Mercedes-Benz	W125	Mercedes-Benz M125 5.7 L8 s	(United Kingdom) Richard Seaman	2, 5
(Germany) Daimler-Benz AG	Mercedes-Benz	W125	Mercedes-Benz M125 5.7 L8 s	(Italy) Goffredo Zehender	3
(Germany) Auto Union AG	Auto Union	C	Auto Union 6.0 V16 s	(Germany) Hans Stuck	All
(Germany) Auto Union AG	Auto Union	C	Auto Union 6.0 V16 s	(Germany) Rudolf Hasse	1-3
(Germany) Auto Union AG	Auto Union	C	Auto Union 6.0 V16 s	(Germany) Hermann Paul Müller	1-2, 5
(Germany) Auto Union AG	Auto Union	C	Auto Union 6.0 V16 s	(Germany) Ernst von Delius	2
(Germany) Auto Union AG	Auto Union	C	Auto Union 6.0 V16 s	(Germany) Bernd Rosemeyer	2-5
(Germany) Auto Union AG	Auto Union	C	Auto Union 6.0 V16 s	(Italy) Luigi Fagioli	4
(Germany) Auto Union AG	Auto Union	C	Auto Union 6.0 V16 s	(Italy) Tazio Nuvolari	4
(Germany) Auto Union AG	Auto Union	C	Auto Union 6.0 V16 s	(Italy) Achille Varzi	5
(Italy) Scuderia Ferrari	Alfa Romeo	12C-36; 8C-35	Alfa Romeo 4.1 V12 s Alfa Romeo 3.8 L8 s	(France) Raymond Sommer	1, 4
(Italy) Scuderia Ferrari	Alfa Romeo	12C-36; 8C-35	Alfa Romeo 4.1 V12 s Alfa Romeo 3.8 L8 s	(Italy) Carlo Felice Trossi	1, 3, 5
(Italy) Scuderia Ferrari	Alfa Romeo	12C-36; 8C-35	Alfa Romeo 4.1 V12 s Alfa Romeo 3.8 L8 s	(Italy) Tazio Nuvolari	2, 5
(Italy) Scuderia Ferrari	Alfa Romeo	12C-36; 8C-35	Alfa Romeo 4.1 V12 s Alfa Romeo 3.8 L8 s	(Italy) Giuseppe Farina	2-5
(Italy) Scuderia Ferrari	Alfa Romeo	12C-36; 8C-35	Alfa Romeo 4.1 V12 s Alfa Romeo 3.8 L8 s	(Italy) Attilio Marinoni	2
(Italy) Scuderia Ferrari	Alfa Romeo	12C-36; 8C-35	Alfa Romeo 4.1 V12 s Alfa Romeo 3.8 L8 s	(Italy) Antonio Brivio	3
(Italy) Scuderia Ferrari	Alfa Romeo	12C-36; 8C-35	Alfa Romeo 4.1 V12 s Alfa Romeo 3.8 L8 s	(Italy) Carlo Pintacuda	3
(Italy) Scuderia Ferrari	Alfa Romeo	12C-36; 8C-35	Alfa Romeo 4.1 V12 s Alfa Romeo 3.8 L8 s	(Italy) Vittorio Belmondo	5
(Italy) Scuderia Ferrari	Alfa Romeo	12C-36; 8C-35	Alfa Romeo 4.1 V12 s Alfa Romeo 3.8 L8 s	(Italy) Clemente Biondetti	5
(Belgium) Franz Gouvion	Maserati	8CM	Maserati 3.0 L8 s	(Belgium) Franz Gouvion	1
(Italy) Graf Salvi del Pero	Alfa Romeo	8C-35	Alfa Romeo 3.8 L8 s	(Italy) Vittorio Belmondo	2
(Italy) Giovanni Minozzi	Alfa Romeo	Monza	Alfa Romeo 2.3 L8 s	(Italy) Giovanni Minozzi	2, 4
(Italy) Scuderia Maremmana	Alfa Romeo	P3	Alfa Romeo 2.9 L8 s	(Italy) Renato Balestrero	2
(Italy) Scuderia Maremmana	Maserati	6CM; 6C 34	Maserati 1.5 L6 s Maserati 3.7 L6 s	(Italy) Franco Cortese	2
(Italy) Scuderia Maremmana	Maserati	6CM; 6C 34	Maserati 1.5 L6 s Maserati 3.7 L6 s	(Italy) Francesco Severi	2
(Italy) Scuderia Maremmana	Maserati	6CM; 6C 34	Maserati 1.5 L6 s Maserati 3.7 L6 s	(Italy) Clemente Biondetti	3
(Italy) Luigi Soffietti	Maserati	6C 34	Maserati 3.7 L6 s	(Italy) Luigi Soffietti	2-3
(Italy) Scuderia Subauda	Maserati	8CM	Maserati 3.0 L8 s	(Italy) Edoardo Teagno	2, 4
(Italy) Scuderia Subauda	Maserati	8CM	Maserati 3.0 L8 s	(Italy) Luigi Soffietti	4
(Germany) Paul Pietsch	Maserati	6C 34	Maserati 3.7 L6 s	(Germany) Paul Pietsch	2-4
(United Kingdom) Kenneth Evans	Alfa Romeo	P3	Alfa Romeo 2.9 L8 s	(United Kingdom) Kenneth Evans	2
(Switzerland) Hans Rüesch	Alfa Romeo	8C-35	Alfa Romeo 3.8 L8 s	(Switzerland) Hans Rüesch	2-5
(Hungary) Count Festetics	Maserati	8CM	Maserati 3.0 L8 s	(Hungary) Ernõ Festetics	2
(Hungary) László Hartmann	Maserati	4CM	Maserati 2.5 L4 s	(Hungary) László Hartmann	2-4
(France) Raymond Sommer	Alfa Romeo	8C-35	Alfa Romeo 3.8 L8 s	(France) Raymond Sommer	2-3
(Switzerland) Max Christen	Maserati	Tipo 26B	Maserati 2.0 L8 s	(Switzerland) Max Christen	4
(Switzerland) Henri Simonot	Alfa Romeo	Monza	Alfa Romeo 2.6 L8 s	(Switzerland) Henri Simonot	4
(Switzerland) Écurie Genevoise	Maserati	8CM	Maserati 3.0 L8 s	(Switzerland) Adolfo Mandirola	4
(Italy) SA Alfa Romeo	Alfa Romeo	12C-37	Alfa Romeo 2.6 L8 s	(Italy) Giovanbattista Guidotti	5

== Season review ==
=== European Championship Grands Prix ===
Rd	Date	Name	Circuit	Winning drivers	Winning constructor	Report
1	11 July	(Belgium) Belgian Grand Prix	Spa-Francorchamps	(Germany) Rudolf Hasse	Auto Union	Report
2	25 July	(Germany) German Grand Prix	Nürburgring	(Germany) Rudolf Caracciola	Mercedes-Benz	Report
3	8 August	Monaco Grand Prix	Monaco	(Germany) Manfred von Brauchitsch	Mercedes-Benz	Report
4	22 August	(Switzerland) Swiss Grand Prix	Bremgarten	(Germany) Rudolf Caracciola	Mercedes-Benz	Report
5	12 September	(Italy) Italian Grand Prix	Livorno	(Germany) Rudolf Caracciola	Mercedes-Benz	Report

=== Non-championship Grands Prix ===
Date	Name	Circuit	Winning driver	Winning constructor	Report
16 January	(South Africa) Grosnevor Grand Prix	Pollsmoor	(Germany) Ernst von Delius	Auto Union	Report
14 February	(Sweden) Flatenloppet	Flaten	(Norway) Eugen Bjørnstad	Alfa Romeo	Report
18 April	(Italy) Valentino Grand Prix	Turin	(Italy) Antonio Brivio	Alfa Romeo	Report
25 April	(Italy) Naples Grand Prix	Posillipo	(Italy) Giuseppe Farina	Alfa Romeo	Report
1 May	(United Kingdom) Campbell Trophy	Brooklands	(Thailand) Prince Bira	Maserati	Report
9 May	(Libya) Tripoli Grand Prix	Mellaha	(Germany) Hermann Lang	Mercedes-Benz	Report
9 May	(Finland) Eläintarhan ajot	Eläintarharata	(Switzerland) Hans Rüesch	Alfa Romeo	Report
16 May	(Belgium) Grand Prix des Frontières	Chimay	(Switzerland) Hans Rüesch	Alfa Romeo	Report
30 May	(Germany) Avusrennen	AVUS	(Germany) Hermann Lang	Mercedes-Benz	Report
30 May	(Italy) Superba Circuit	Genoa	(Italy) Carlo Felice Trossi	Alfa Romeo	Report
30 May	(Romania) Bucharest Grand Prix	Bucharest	(Switzerland) Hans Rüesch	Alfa Romeo	Report
6 June	(Brazil) Rio de Janeiro Grand Prix	Gávea	(Italy) Carlo Maria Pintacuda	Alfa Romeo	Report
13 June	(Germany) Eifelrennen	Nürburgring	(Germany) Bernd Rosemeyer	Auto Union	Report
20 June	(Italy) Milan Grand Prix	Milan	(Italy) Tazio Nuvolari	Alfa Romeo	Report
5 July	(United States) Vanderbilt Cup	Roosevelt Raceway	(Germany) Bernd Rosemeyer	Auto Union	Report
25 July	(Italy) San Remo Grand Prix	San Remo Circuit	(Italy) Achille Varzi	Maserati	Report
25 July	(Portugal) Vila Real Circuit	Vila Real	(Portugal) Vasco Sameiro	Alfa Romeo	Report
15 August	(Italy) Coppa Acerbo	Pescara	(Germany) Bernd Rosemeyer	Auto Union	Report
15 August	(Portugal) Estoril Circuit	Estoril	(Portugal) Manoel de Oliveira	Ford	Report
28 August	(United Kingdom) Junior Car Club 200 mile race	Donington Park	(United Kingdom) Arthur Dobson	ERA	Report
26 September	(Czechoslovakia) Masaryk Grand Prix	Brno	(Germany) Rudolf Caracciola	Mercedes-Benz	Report
2 October	(United Kingdom) Donington Grand Prix	Donington Park	(Germany) Bernd Rosemeyer	Auto Union	Report
16 October	(United Kingdom) Mountain Championship	Brooklands	(Switzerland) Hans Rüesch	Alfa Romeo	Report
31 October	(Finland) Kalastajatorpanajo	Helsinki	(Finland) Karl Ebb	Mercedes-Benz	Report

== Championship final standings ==
Pos	Driver	BEL (Belgium)	GER (Germany)	MON (Monaco)	SUI (Switzerland)	ITA (Italy)	Pts
1	(Germany) Rudolf Caracciola		1	2	1	1	13
2	(Germany) Manfred von Brauchitsch	Ret	2	1	3	Ret	15
3	(Germany) Hermann Lang	3	7		2	2	19
=	(Switzerland) Christian Kautz	4	6	3	6	Ret	19
5	(Germany) Hans Stuck	2	Ret	4	4	9	20
6	(France) Raymond Sommer	5	Ret	7	8		27
7	(Germany) Rudolf Hasse	1	5	Ret			28
=	(Germany) Bernd Rosemeyer		3	Ret	Ret	3	28
=	(Italy) Tazio Nuvolari		4		5	7	28
=	(Italy) Giuseppe Farina		Ret	6	Ret	Ret	28
11	(Hungary) László Hartmann		Ret	Ret	9		29
12	(Switzerland) Hans Rüesch		8	8	Ret		31
13	(Italy) Vittorio Belmondo		12			10	32
14	(Germany) Hermann Paul Müller	Ret	Ret			5	33
15	(United Kingdom) Richard Seaman		Ret			4	34
=	(Italy) Clemente Biondetti			Ret		Ret	34
17	(Italy) Luigi Soffietti		Ret	Ret			35
=	(Italy) Carlo Felice Trossi	Ret				8	35
=	(Germany) Paul Pietsch		Ret		10		35
20	(United Kingdom) Kenneth Evans		9				36
=	(Hungary) Ernő Festetics		10				36
=	(Italy) Attilio Marinoni		11				36
=	(Italy) Giovanni Minozzi		Ret		Ret		36
=	(Italy) Goffredo Zehender			5			36
=	(Italy) Carlo Maria Pintacuda			9			36
=	(Italy) Luigi Fagioli				7		36
=	(Italy) Achille Varzi					6	36
28	(Switzerland) Henri Simonet				Ret		37
=	(Switzerland) Adolfo Mandirola				Ret		37
30	(Italy) Franco Cortese		Ret				38
=	(Germany) Ernst von Delius		Ret				38
=	(Italy) Giovanbattista Guidotti					Ret	38
33	(Italy) Francesco Severi		Ret				39
=	(Italy) Renato Balestrero		Ret				39
=	(Italy) Edoardo Teagno		Ret				39
=	(Italy) Antonio Brivio			Ret			39
=	(Switzerland) Max Christen				Ret		39
Pos	Driver	BEL (Belgium)	GER (Germany)	MON (Monaco)	SUI (Switzerland)	ITA (Italy)	Pts

Colour	Result	Points
Gold	Winner	1
Silver	2nd place	2
Bronze	3rd place	3
Green	Completed more than 75%	4
Blue	Completed between 50% and 75%	5
Purple	Completed between 25% and 50%	6
Red	Completed less than 25%	7
Black	Disqualified	8
Blank	Did not participate	8
