= Renato Balestrero =

Italian racecar driver

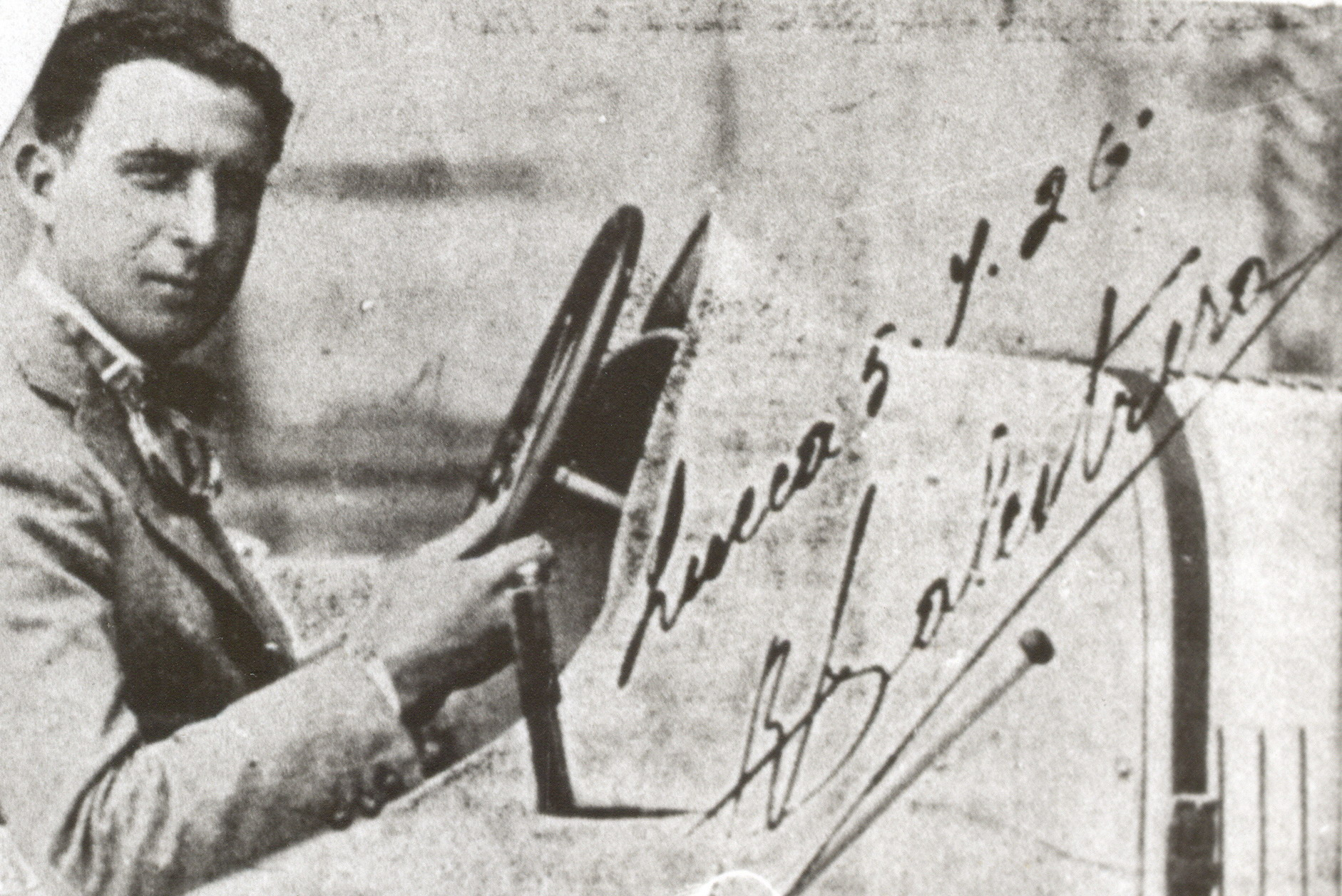
Balestrero in a Bugatti T35C around 1926

Renato Balestrero (27 July 1898 – 18 February 1948) was an Italian racecar driver from Genoa, winning 54 out of 217 races between 1922 and 1947.

Born in Lucca, he lived in Genoa and was active in the First World War. He started out in an Officine Meccaniche 665 winning the Coppa Ciano 1924 and several events in the 1925 Grand Prix season and 1926 Grand Prix season, including the I Tripoli Grand Prix 1925.

He then bought a Bugatti T35C for 75 000 francs which he raced 1927 and 1929. As an agent to General Motors he raced the newly launched La Salle (automobile) in 1928. Other cars included a Talbot 1700 (1931), as well as Alfa Romeo 8C 2300, Alfa Romeo P3 and Fiat 1100 cars.

Since before the Second World War, he ran the Scuderia Balestrero, which including himself, Giovanni Balestrero and Clemente Balestrero. Since 1953 the Lucca-based Scuderia Balestrero has been active.

Balestrero died in the Niguarda Hospital of Milan, after being hit in a roadside accident by a Gazzetta dello Sport car. He was hauling an engine to the Nardi Danese workshop.

== Racing record ==
=== Complete 24 Hours of Le Mans results ===
Year	Team	Co-Drivers	Car	Class	Laps	Pos.	Class Pos.
1926	(Italy) Officine Meccaniche	(France) Frédéric Thelluson	O.M. Tipo 665 Superba	2.0	94	DSQ	DSQ

=== Complete European Championship results ===
(key) (Races in bold indicate pole position) (Races in italics indicate fastest lap)

Year	Entrant	Chassis	Engine	1	2	3	4	5	6	7	EDC	Pts
1931	A. Ruggeri	Talbot 700	Talbot 1.7 L8	ITA; 7	FRA	BEL					14th	20
1935	Gruppo Genovese San Giorgio	Maserati 8C 3000	Maserati 3.0 L8	MON	FRA	BEL	GER; Ret				21st	51
1935	Gruppo Genovese San Giorgio	Maserati 26M	Maserati 2.5 L8					SUI; 12	ITA	ESP	21st	51
1937	Scuderia Maremmana	Alfa Romeo Tipo B/P3	Alfa Romeo 2.9 L8	BEL	GER; Ret	MON	SUI	ITA			33rd	39
1938	R. Balestrero	Alfa Romeo Tipo 308	Alfa Romeo 3.0 L8	FRA	GER; 7	SUI	ITA				14th	28
