= László Hartmann =

Hungarian racing driver

- Nationality: Hungarian
- Born: 17 August 1901 Budapest, Kingdom of Hungary
- Died: 16 May 1938 (aged 36) Tripoli, Italian Libya
- Years active: late 1920s–1938

László Hartmann (17 August 1901 – 16 May 1938) was a Hungarian Grand Prix motor racing driver.

== Biography ==
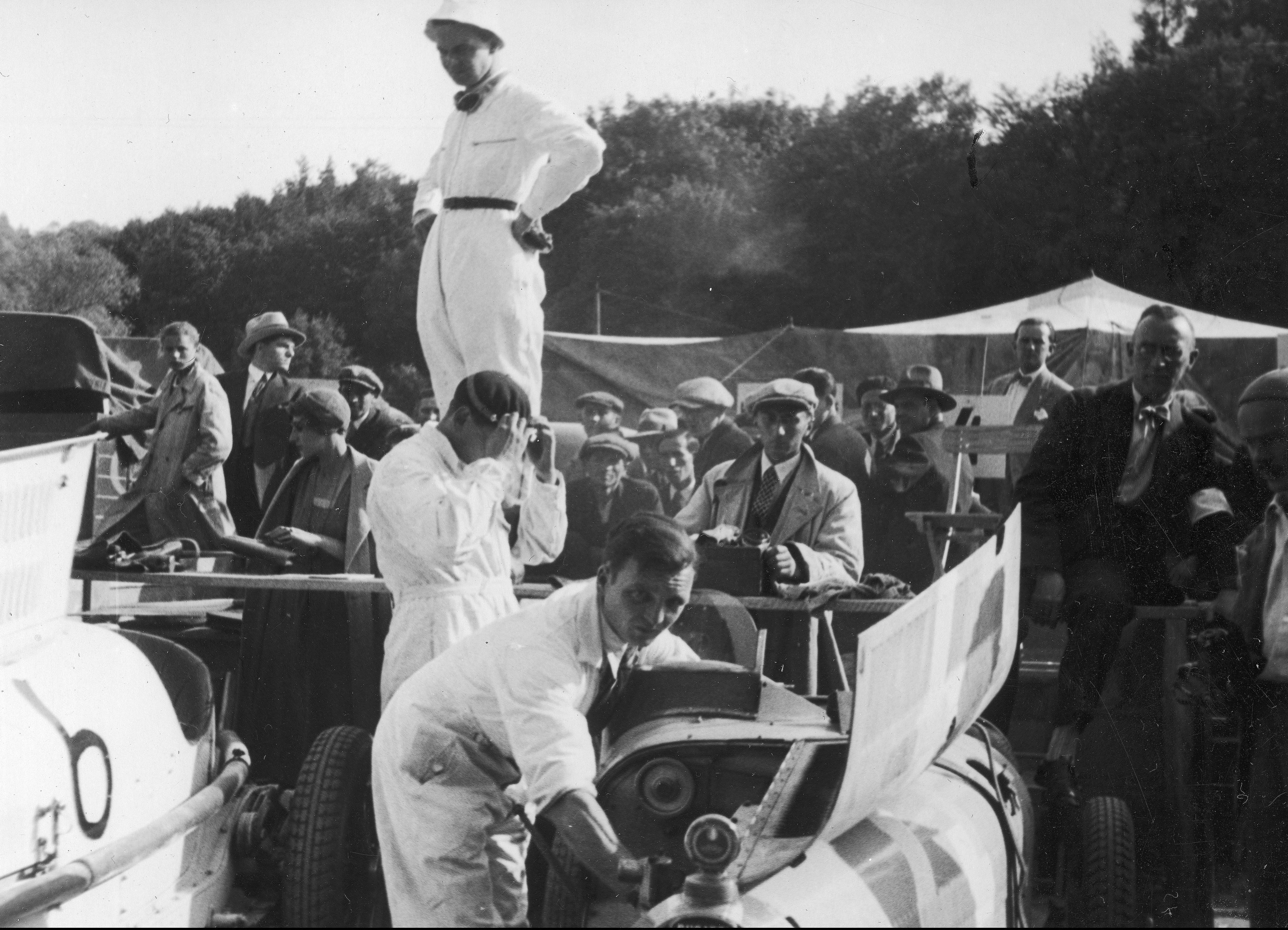
Hartmann's Bugatti T37A before the 1932 Lviv Grand Prix

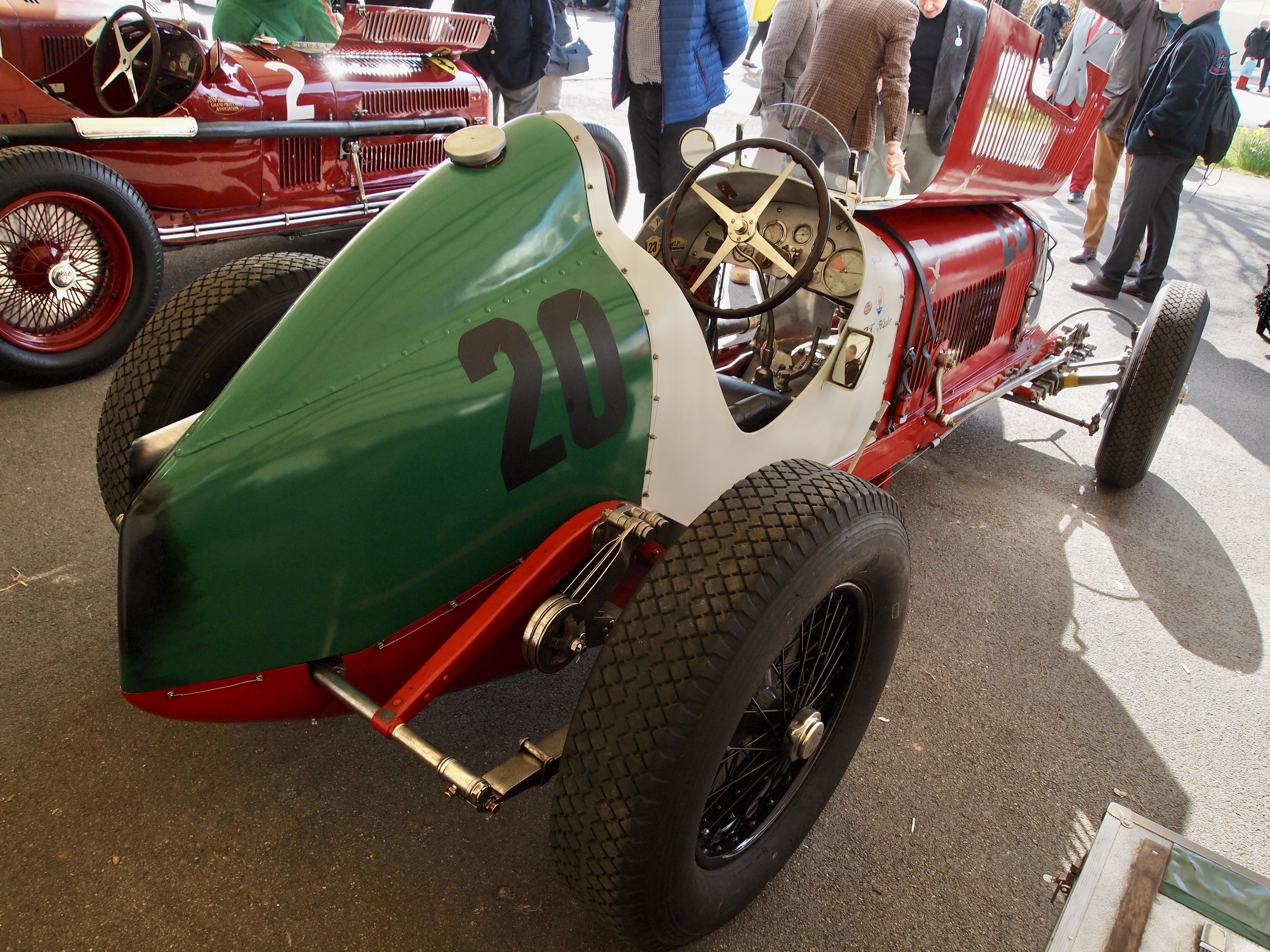
Hartmann's Maserati 8CM, Goodwood Members' Meeting 2015

Despite showing little aptitude while training for his road licence, Hartmann was on one of Hungary's leading competition drivers of the pre-World War II period. He began his racing career in the late 1920s, driving his own privately entered Hupmobile in local circuit and hillclimb events. He later bought a Bugatti Type 35B from compatriot Count Tivadar Zichy in 1929, and a Type 37A sports car bought in 1930. Following this, he began to enter more challenging European events in addition to those in his home country. Hartmann regularly featured in the top five finishers at most European hillclimb events in the following few years, and in 1930 he took second place overall in the European Mountain Championship series. His performances caught the attention of the Bugatti factory and they occasionally lent him a more powerful Type 51, with which he won the hillclimb events at Guggenberg in 1932 and 1933.

=== Grands Prix ===
In addition to racing against the clock Hartmann also participated in a number of Grand Prix circuit races during this period, never failing to finish in the top 10 when mechanical maladies or accidents didn't prevent him from finishing at all.

For 1935 Hartmann moved to Italian manufacturer Maserati and replaced his Bugattis with a Maserati 8CM, that he painted in the national red, white and green racing colours of Hungary. It was with this car that year that Hartmann recorded some of the best international circuit racing results of his career: third place in the Grand Prix du Comminges, and fourth place in the Grand Prix des Frontières. He retained the 8CM into 1936, but part way through 1937 he decided to upgrade to a Maserati 6C 34, direct from the Maserati factory and formerly driven by the Italian superstar Tazio Nuvolari. Again he posted respectable top class results for a privateer entrant, but by this time the German state-funded Silver Arrows program was beginning to take a stranglehold on European racing leaving only the lower positions as realistic targets for individuals such as Hartmann. Away from the Grand Prix circus Hartmann continued to score well and occasionally win in the lesser voiturette and hillclimb events. His successes even prompted the Maserati works team to offer him a few drives as a semi-works entry, earning a salary for his racing for the first time.

=== Death ===
His first major race of the 1938 Grand Prix season was also his last. The 1938 Tripoli Grand Prix was unusual in that instead of running the Grand Prix cars and the slower voiturette cars in separate events, the fields were combined into one race. There was confusion at the start as some of the voiturette cars were moving before the flag fell, resulting in a mixed field of fast and slower cars on the approach to the fast first corner. This confusion continued throughout the race, with the speed differential between the two classes causing a number of accidents, including a fatal crash for Italian Alfa Romeo works driver Eugenio Siena. On Hartmann's 11th lap his Maserati 4CM voiturette was caught by the Grand Prix-class Alfa Romeo 312 of Giuseppe Farina, well over a lap ahead already. As the Italian made to lap Hartmann for a second time their cars touched wheels, sending them both rolling off the race track. Both drivers were thrown from their vehicles, and although Farina escaped with only cuts and bruises Hartmann's spine was broken. He died during the early hours of the following morning, in hospital. After a short ceremony at the circuit Hartmann's body was flown back to Hungary, and he was buried in Budapest's Rákoskeresztúr Cemetery.

== Complete European Championship results ==
| Year | Entrant | Chassis | Engine | 1 | 2 | 3 | 4 | 5 | 6 | 7 | EDC | Pts | Ref |
|---|---|---|---|---|---|---|---|---|---|---|---|---|---|
| 1935 | László Hartmann | Maserati 8CM | Maserati 3.0 L Straight-8 | MON | FRA | BEL | GER; Ret | SUI; Ret | ITA | ESP | NC | 0 | |
| 1937 | László Hartmann | Maserati 8CM | Maserati 3.0 L Straight-8 | BEL | GER; Ret | MON; 10 | | ITA | | | 11th | 29 | |
| 1937 | László Hartmann | Maserati 6CM | Maserati 1,493.2 cc inline-6 | | | | SUI; Ret | | | | 11th | 29 | |
