= List of 1937 motorsport champions =

1937 motorsport champions
Previous: 1936	Next: 1938

This list of 1937 motorsport champions is a list of national or international auto racing series with a Championship decided by the points or positions earned by a driver from multiple races.

== Open wheel racing ==
Series	Driver	Season article
AIACR European Championship	(Germany) Rudolf Caracciola	1937 Grand Prix season
AAA National Championship	(United States) Wilbur Shaw	1937 AAA Championship Car season

== Motorcycle ==
Series	Rider	Season article
Speedway World Championship	(United States) Jack Milne	1937 Individual Speedway World Championship

== Stock car ==
Series	Rider	Season article
Campeonato Argentino de Velocidad	(Argentina) Eduardo Pedrazzini	1937 Campeonato Argentino de Velocidad

== See also ==
- List of motorsport championships
- Auto racing
