= 1937 German Grand Prix =

Race 2 of 5 in the 1937 European Championship
← Previous race	Next race →

Race details
- Date: 25 July 1937
- Official name: X Großer Preis von Deutschland
- Location: Nürburgring; Nürburg, Germany
- Course: Permanent racing facility
- Course length: 22.810 km (14.173 miles)
- Distance: 22 laps, 501.82 km (311.82 miles)
- Weather: Cold, windy

Pole position
Driver	(Germany) Bernd Rosemeyer	Auto Union
- Time: 9:46.2

Fastest lap
Driver	(Germany) Bernd Rosemeyer	Auto Union
- Time: 9:53.4

Podium
First	(Germany) Rudolf Caracciola	Mercedes-Benz
Second	(Germany) Manfred von Brauchitsch	Mercedes-Benz
Third	(Germany) Bernd Rosemeyer	Auto Union

The 1937 German Grand Prix was a Grand Prix motor race held at the Nürburgring on 25 July 1937.

Driver Ernst von Delius collided with Richard Seaman during this race on lap 6 and the accident was eventually fatal for von Delius, experiencing thrombosis. Von Delius was 25 years old.

== Classification ==
Pos	No	Driver	Team	Car	Laps	Time/Retired	Grid	Points
1	12	(Germany) Rudolf Caracciola	Daimler-Benz AG	Mercedes-Benz W125	22	3:46:00.1	4	1
2	14	(Germany) Manfred von Brauchitsch	Daimler-Benz AG	Mercedes-Benz W125	22	+46.2	3	2
3	4	(Germany) Bernd Rosemeyer	Auto Union	Auto Union C	22	+1:01.3	1	3
4	22	(Italy) Tazio Nuvolari	Scuderia Ferrari	Alfa Romeo 12C-36	22	+4:03.9	5	4
5	8	(Germany) Rudolf Hasse	Auto Union	Auto Union C	22	+5:25.0	6	4
6	20	(Switzerland) Christian Kautz	Daimler-Benz AG	Mercedes-Benz W125	22	+6:10.2	10	4
7	16	(Germany) Hermann Lang	Daimler-Benz AG	Mercedes-Benz W125	21	+1 Lap	2	4
8	44	(Switzerland) Hans Ruesch	Private entry	Alfa Romeo 8C-35	21	+1 Lap	13	4
9	42	(United Kingdom) Kenneth Evans	Private entry	Alfa Romeo Tipo B	19	+3 Laps	19	4
DNF	34	(Italy) Luigi Soffietti	Private entry	Maserati 6C-34	19		22	4
10	46	(Hungary) Ernő Festetics	Private entry	Maserati 8CM	18	+4 Laps	21	4
11	54	(Italy) Attilio Marinoni	Scuderia Ferrari	Alfa Romeo 12C-36	18	+4 Laps	18	4
12	28	(Italy) Vittorio Belmondo	Graf Salvi del Pero	Alfa Romeo C	18	+4 Laps	15	4
DNF	48	(Hungary) László Hartmann	Private entry	Maserati 8CM	18		24	4
DNF	24	(Italy) Giuseppe Farina	Scuderia Ferrari	Alfa Romeo 12C-36	18	Ignition	11	4
DNF	38	(Italy) Franco Cortese	Scuderia Maremmana	Maserati 6CM	7	Chassis	23	6
DNF	2	(Germany) Ernst von Delius	Auto Union	Auto Union C	6	Fatal accident	9	6
DNF	18	(United Kingdom) Richard Seaman	Daimler-Benz AG	Mercedes-Benz W125	6	Accident	8	6
DNF	10	(Germany) Hans Stuck	Auto Union	Auto Union C	6	Engine	12	6
DNF	40	(Germany) Paul Pietsch	Private entry	Maserati 6C-34	5	Fuel tank	14	7
DNF	30	(Italy) Giovanni Minozzi	Private entry	Maserati 8CM	4	Accident	25	7
DNF	52	(Italy) Francesco Severi	Scuderia Maremmana	Maserati 6C-34	4	Accident	17	7
DNF	32	(Italy) Renato Balestrero	Scuderia Maremmana	Alfa Romeo Tipo B	3	Fuel pipe	20	7
DNF	36	(Italy) Edoardo Teagno	Scuderia Subauda	Maserati 8CM	2	Rear axle	26	7
DNF	50	(France) Raymond Sommer	Private entry	Alfa Romeo C	2	Rear axle	16	7
DNF	6	(Germany) Hermann Paul Müller	Auto Union	Auto Union C	2	Accident	7	7

Grand Prix Race
Previous race: 1937 Belgian Grand Prix	1937 Grand Prix season Grandes Épreuves	Next race: 1937 Monaco Grand Prix
Previous race: 1936 German Grand Prix	German Grand Prix	Next race: 1938 German Grand Prix
