= List of 1938 motorsport champions =

1938 motorsport champions
Previous: 1937	Next: 1939

This list of 1938 motorsport champions is a list of national or international auto racing series with a Championship decided by the points or positions earned by a driver from multiple races.

== Open wheel racing ==
Series	Driver	Season article
AIACR European Championship	(Germany) Rudolf Caracciola	1938 Grand Prix season
AAA National Championship	(United States) Floyd Roberts	1938 AAA Championship Car season

== Motorcycle ==
Series	Rider	Season article
Speedway World Championship	(Australia) Bluey Wilkinson	1938 Individual Speedway World Championship

== Stock car ==
Series	Rider	Season article
Campeonato Argentino de Velocidad	(Argentina) Ricardo Leopoldo Risatti	1938 Campeonato Argentino de Velocidad

== See also ==
- List of motorsport championships
- Auto racing
