= List of 1936 motorsport champions =

1936 motorsport champions
Previous: 1935	Next: 1937

This list of 1936 motorsport champions is a list of national or international auto racing series with a Championship decided by the points or positions earned by a driver from multiple races.

== Open wheel racing ==
Series	Driver	Season article
AIACR European Championship	(Germany) Bernd Rosemeyer	1936 Grand Prix season
AAA National Championship	(United States) Mauri Rose	1936 AAA Championship Car season

== Motorcycle ==
Series	Rider	Season article
Speedway World Championship	(Australia) Lionel Van Praag	1936 Individual Speedway World Championship

== See also ==
- List of motorsport championships
- Auto racing
