= Christian Kautz =

Swiss racing driver (1913–1948)

Portrait of Christian Kautz

Christian Kautz (23 November 1913 – 4 July 1948) was an auto racing driver from Switzerland.

Son of a Swiss multi-millionaire, he career started with Mercedes-Benz as a junior driver in 1936, then as an Auto Union junior driver in 1938, starting in three Grands Prix. Kautz was a test pilot for Lockheed in the United States during the Second World War. He was only 34 when he died in an accident in a Maserati at the 1948 Swiss Grand Prix in Bremgarten.

== Racing record ==
=== Complete European Championship results ===
(key) (Races in bold indicate pole position) (Races in italics indicate fastest lap)

Year	Entrant	Chassis	Engine	1	2	3	4	5	EDC	Pts
1937	Daimler-Benz AG	Mercedes W125	Mercedes 5.7 L8s	BEL; 4	GER; 6	MON; 3	SUI; 6	ITA; Ret	3rd	19
1938	Auto Union AG	Auto Union D	Auto Union 3.0 V12s	FRA; Ret	GER	SUI; Ret	ITA; Ret		14th	28
1939	Christian Kautz	Alfa Romeo Tipo 308	Alfa Romeo 3.0 L8s	BEL	FRA; DNS	GER	SUI		—^{1}	

Notes

- **^1** – Not listed in the Championship.

=== Post WWII Grandes Épreuves results ===
(key) (Races in bold indicate pole position; races in italics indicate fastest lap)

Year	Entrant	Chassis	Engine	1	2	3	4
1947	Christian Kautz	Maserati 4CL	Maserati 4CL 1.5 L4s	SUI	BEL; Ret	ITA	FRA
1948	Enrico Platé	Maserati 4CL	Maserati 4CL 1.5 L4s	MON	SUI; Ret	FRA	ITA
