= Manfred von Brauchitsch =

German racing driver (1905–2003)

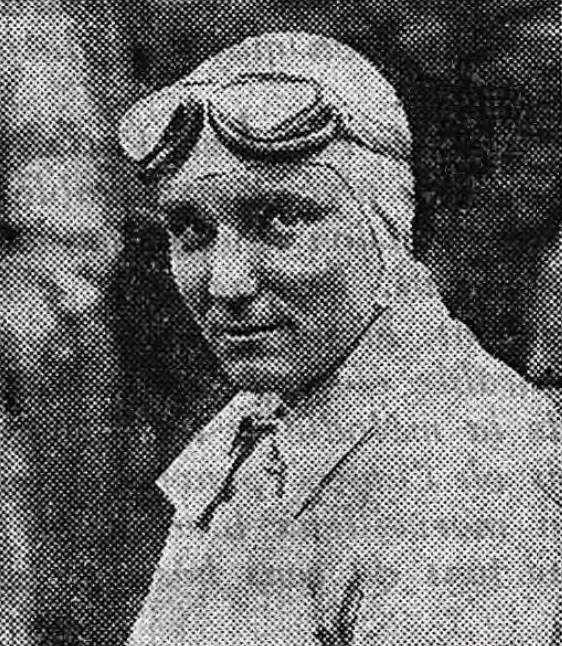
- Von Brauchitsch in 1937
- Born: 15 August 1905; Hamburg, Germany
- Died: 5 February 2003 (aged 97); Gräfenwarth, Schleiz, Germany
- Occupation: Racing driver

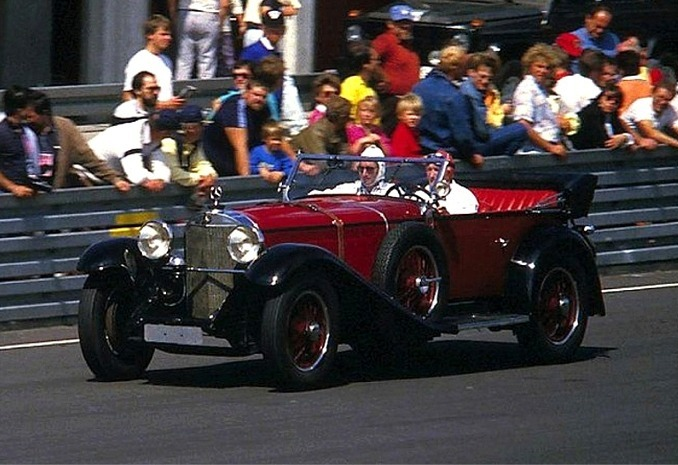
Manfred von Brauchitsch in 1986 with Mercedes-Benz K

Manfred Georg Rudolf von Brauchitsch (15 August 1905 – 5 February 2003) was a German auto racing driver who drove for Mercedes-Benz in the famous "Silver Arrows" of Grand Prix motor racing in the 1930s.

== Racing career ==
Brauchitsch won three Grands Prix - the 1934 ADAC Eifelrennen which saw the first appearance of Silver Arrows Mercedes Race cars, the 1937 Monaco Grand Prix (considered his greatest victory), and the 1938 French Grand Prix. His fastest lap in the 1937 Monaco race (1 minute 46.5 seconds, 11.9 seconds faster than the old record lap) set a record that stood for 18 years.

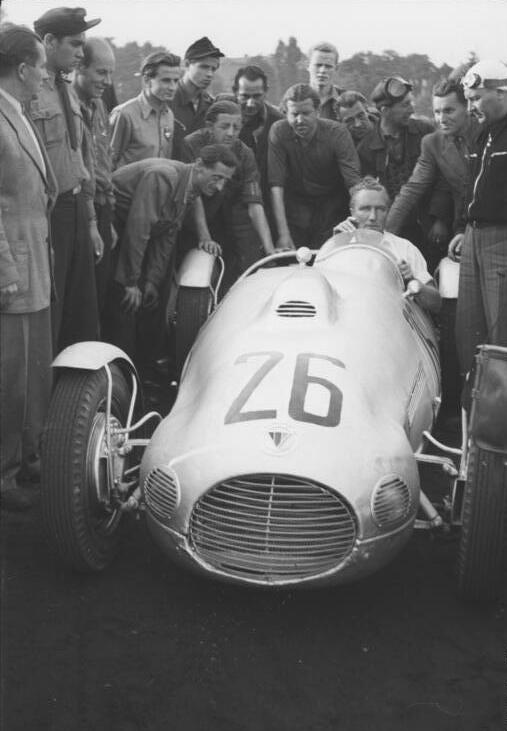
Von Brauchitsch in 1951

He was twice runner-up in the European Championship, in 1937 and 1938, and finished third in 1935.

He was noted for his red helmet and his bad luck, losing a number of other Grands Prix when he was on the very verge of winning (no less than five, by some counts). His most famous loss was the 1935 German Grand Prix, when a tire blew while he was leading the last lap, handing victory to Tazio Nuvolari in an Alfa Romeo in one of the latter's most famous victories - one of the only times during the reign of the Silver Arrows when a Grand Prix was won by a car other than a Mercedes or Auto Union.

== Personal life ==
Brauchitsch was born in Hamburg, of an old military family (his uncle was the World War II general Walther von Brauchitsch). He had a brother, Harald. He entered the German Reichswehr after World War I, but after a serious accident he was invalided out in 1928. Due to his many racing injuries, he was rejected for military service in World War II. While working during the war, he met his first wife, Gisela. He became a member of the National Socialist Motor Corps, in which he held the rank of Sturmführer.

Following World War II, being the son and nephew of military officers was not of much practical use in West Germany. After several failed businesses, Brauchitsch contacted Caracciola, who gave him contacts in South America. Unable to settle there, he returned to West Germany embittered and became a target for the communists of East Germany. Again unable to settle, he returned to West Germany, where he was arrested and charged with espionage. In 1951, he was jailed and then released on bail.

During a bail period in 1955, Brauchitsch defected to East Germany; after his wife Gisela committed suicide a year earlier. He was put in charge of the East German national motor sport organisation, as well as becoming president of its movement to promote the Olympic ideal. The latter led to his being awarded the Olympic Order in 1988 by the International Olympic Committee.

Brauchitsch later remarried, to Lieselotte, and they were permitted to visit West Germany occasionally. Following the death of Hermann Lang in 1987, Brauchitsch was regarded as the last surviving member of the pre-war "Silver Arrow" drivers. He died in Gräfenwarth in 2003.

== Complete European Championship results ==
(key) (Races in bold indicate pole position, * denotes a shared drive)

Year	Entrant	Make	1	2	3	4	5	6	7	EDC	Points
1935	Daimler-Benz AG	Mercedes-Benz	MON; Ret	FRA; 2	BEL; 2 *	GER; 5	SUI; Ret	ITA; Ret	ESP; 3	3	34
1936	Daimler-Benz AG	Mercedes-Benz	MON; Ret	GER; 7	SUI; Ret	ITA				10=	24
1937	Daimler-Benz AG	Mercedes-Benz	BEL; Ret	GER; 2	MON; 1	SUI; 3	ITA; Ret			**2**	**15**
1938	Daimler-Benz AG	Mercedes-Benz	FRA; 1	**GER**; Ret	SUI; 3	ITA; 3 *				**2**	**15**
1939	Daimler-Benz AG	Mercedes-Benz	BEL; 3	FRA; Ret	GER; Ret	SUI; 3				4=	19
