= List of 1935 motorsport champions =

1935 motorsport champions
Previous: 1934	Next: 1936

This list of 1935 motorsport champions is a list of national or international auto racing series with a Championship decided by the points or positions earned by a driver from multiple races.

== Open wheel racing ==
Series	Driver	Season article
AIACR European Championship	(Germany) Rudolf Caracciola	1935 Grand Prix season
AAA National Championship	(United States) Kelly Petillo	1935 AAA Championship Car season

== Motorcycle racing ==
=== Speedway ===
Series	Driver	Season article
Star Riders' Championship	(United Kingdom) Frank Charles	1935 Star Riders' Championship

== See also ==
- List of motorsport championships
- Auto racing
