= Maserati V8RI =

Maserati V8 RI
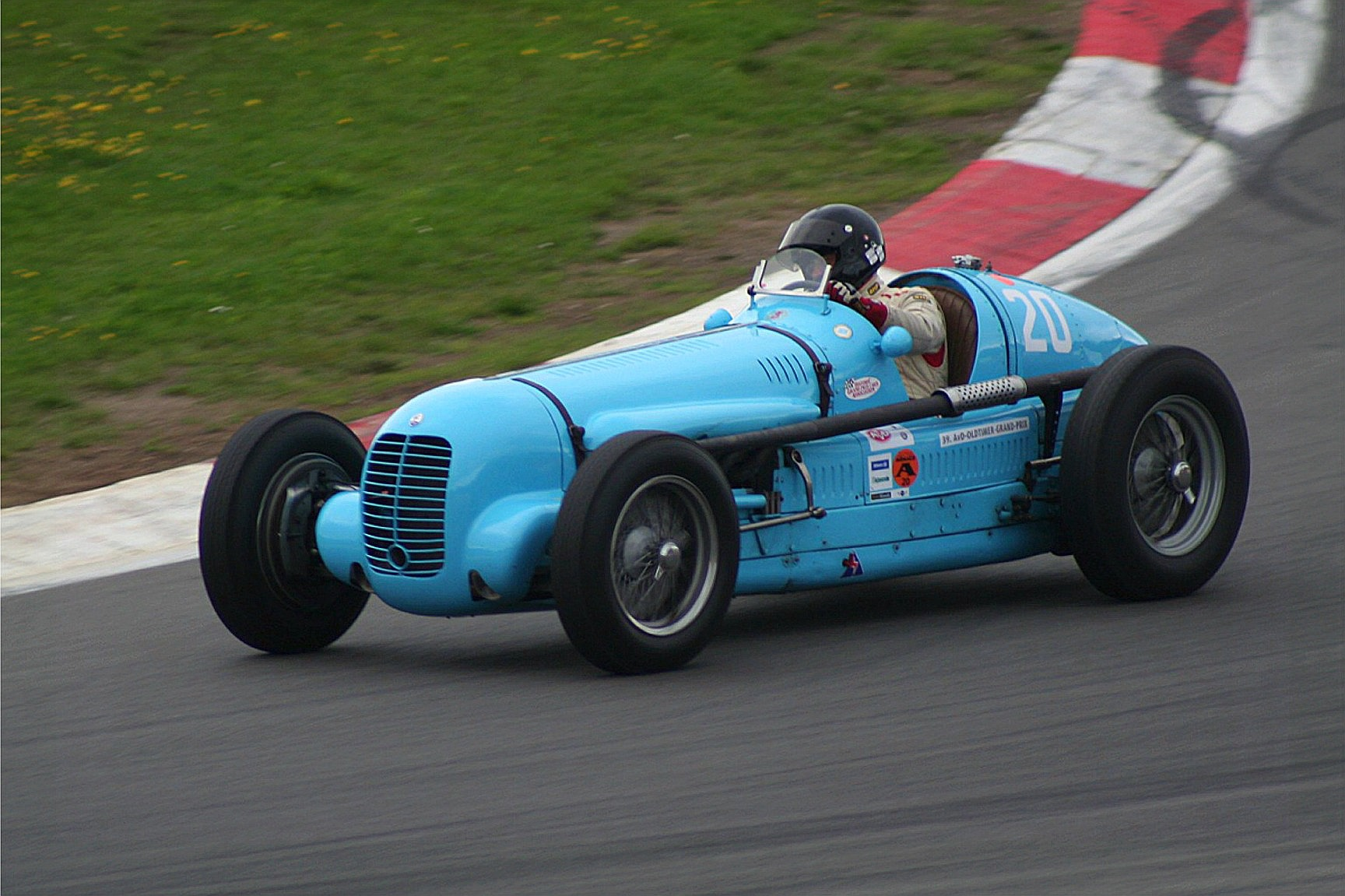
- A Maserati V8RI in 2011

Overview
- Manufacturer: Maserati
- Production: 1935-1936

Body and chassis
- Class: Race car
- Layout: FR layout

Powertrain
- Engine: 4.8 L (4,788 cc), 90° V8 engine
- Power output: 320 horsepower
- Transmission: 4-speed manual

Dimensions
- Wheelbase: 2,560 mm (101 in)
- Length: 3,865 mm (152.2 in)
- Width: 1,490 mm (59 in)
- Height: 1,250 mm (49 in)
- Curb weight: 750 kg (1,650 lb)

Chronology
- Predecessor: Maserati 6C 34
- Successor: Maserati 8CTF

The Maserati V8RI was a model of racing car produced by Italian manufacturer Maserati of Modena from 1935 to 1936, with a total of four units.

Designed by Ernesto Maserati, they had a front-mounted 4.788-liter V8 engine, 90 degrees, bore was 84 mm and stroke was 108 mm. A Roots type supercharger and dual choke Weber carburetor, single camshaft resulted in 320 bhp (239 kW) and a maximum speed of 270 km/h (168 mph). The "RI" denoted Ruote indipendenti, the then innovative independent four-wheel suspension. The cars measurements were wheelbase 2,560 mm (101 in), length 3,865 mm (152.2 in), width 1,490 mm (59 in), and height 1,250 mm (49 in).

Chassis #4501 debuted at Grand Prix de la Marne 1935, driven by Philippe Étancelin. Its only victory was the Pau Grand Prix in 1936. All four V8RIs built competed in the 1937 Vanderbilt Cup at New York's Roosevelt Field, and all four remained in the United States for many years afterwards.

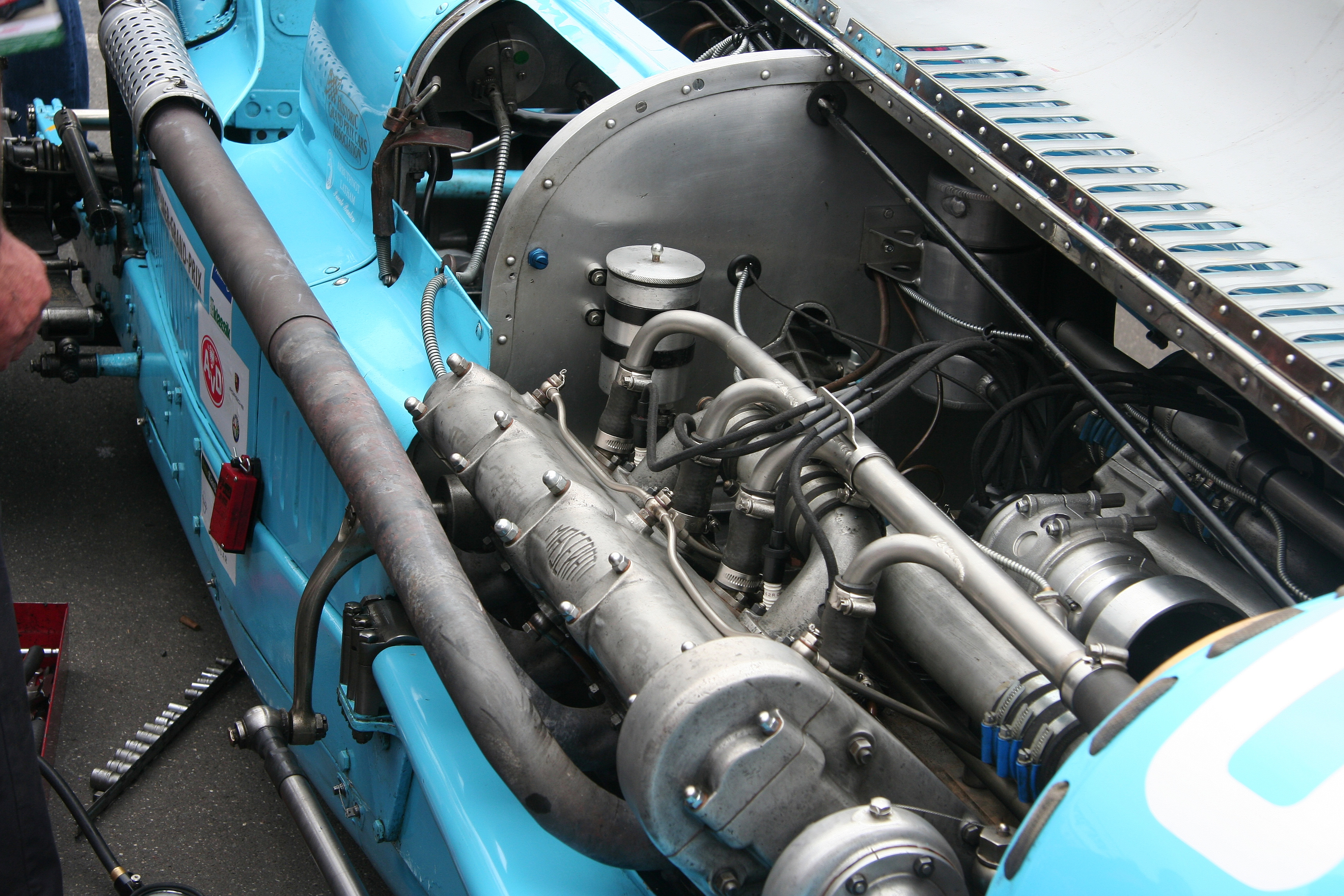
Maserati V8 RI engine

== Technical Data ==
| Technical data | V8RI |
|---|---|
| Engine: | Front mounted 90° 8 cylinder V engine |
| displacement | 4788 cm³ |
| Bore x stroke: | 84 x 108 mm |
| Max power at rpm: | 320 hp at 5 300 rpm |
| Valve control: | 1 overhead camshaft per cylinder row, 2 valves per cylinder |
| Compression: | 5.0:1 |
| Carburetor: | Double Weber 55 |
| Upload: | Roots compressor |
| Gearbox: | 4-speed manual, transaxle |
| suspension front: | Double cross links, torsion springs |
| suspension rear: | Pendulum shaft, leaf springs |
| Brakes: | Hydraulic drum brakes |
| Chassis & body: | Box beam frame with aluminum body |
| Wheelbase: | 256 cm |
| Dry weight: | 750 kg |
| Top speed: | 280 km/h |
