= List of 1939 motorsport champions =

1939 motorsport champions
Previous: 1938	Next: 1940

This list of 1939 motorsport champions is a list of national or international auto racing series with a Championship decided by the points or positions earned by a driver from multiple races.

== Open wheel racing ==
Series	Driver	Season article
AIACR European Championship	(Germany) Hermann Paul Müller	1939 Grand Prix season
AAA National Championship	(United States) Wilbur Shaw	1939 AAA Championship Car season

== Stock car racing ==
Series	Driver	Season article
Turismo Carretera	(Argentina) Ángel Lo Valvo	1939 Turismo Carretera

== See also ==
- List of motorsport championships
- Auto racing
