= Vittorio Belmondo =

Italian racing driver

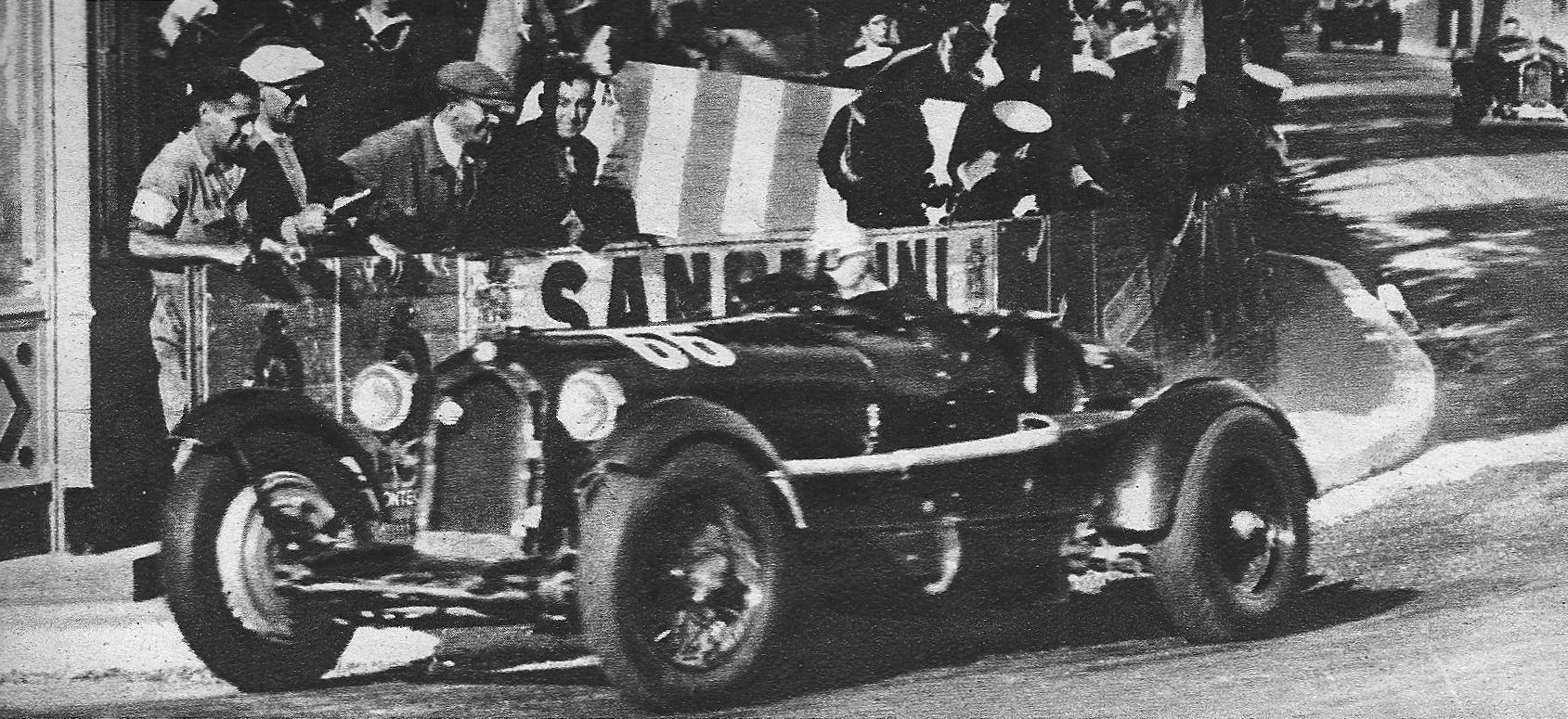
Vittorio Belmondo in an Alfa Romeo 8C, at the Varese circuit in 1935

Vittorio Belmondo (1 January 1912 – 25 June 1962) was an Italian racing driver. He entered 23 races in Maseratis and Alfa Romeos between 1934 and 1938, his best results being one victory, one second place and three third places.

== Complete results ==
| Year | Date | Race | Location | Entrant | Car | Teammate(s) | Result |
|---|---|---|---|---|---|---|---|
| 1934 | August 26 | Stelvio Hillclimb | Stelvio Pass | - | Alfa Romeo 8C | - | - |
| 1935 | April 28 | XXVI° Targa Florio | Madonie | V Belmondo | Alfa Romeo 8C 2300 Monza | none | 7th |
| 1935 | July 21 | I Circuito di Varese | Varese | V Belmondo | Alfa Romeo 8C 2300 Monza | none | 1st |
| 1936 | April 5 | Mille Miglia | - | - | Alfa Romeo 6C 2300 Pescara | "F. Balbis" | 11th |
| 1936 | June 28 | I° Circuito di Milano | Parco Sempione | - | Alfa Romeo Tipo B | - | DNF |
| 1936 | June 28 | I° Circuito di Milano (Voiturette) | Parco Sempione | - | Maserati 4C | - | 3rd |
| 1936 | August 2 | X° Coppa Ciano | Montenero Circuit | - | Maserati | - | DNS |
| 1936 | August 23 | III Prix de Berne | Bremgarten Circuit | - | Maserati 4CM | - | DNF |
| 1936 | September 6 | II Coppa Edda Ciano | Lucca | - | Alfa Romeo | - | DNS |
| 1936 | September 7 | II Coppa Edda Ciano (Voiturette) | Lucca | - | Maserati 4CM | - | 2nd |
| 1937 | April 18 | II° Gran Premio del Valentino / Circuito di Torino | Parco del Valentino | V. Belmondo | Maserati 4CM | none | DNS |
| 1937 | April 25 | III° Grand Prix of Naples | Posillipo | Officine A Maserati | Maserati 6CM | Ettore Bianco | 5th |
| 1937 | May 9 | XI Gran Premio di Tripoli | Mellaha Lake | V. Belmondo | Maserati 4C(M) | none | NC |
| 1937 | May 23 | XXVIII Targa Florio | Circuito del Parco della Favorita | - | Maserati | - | 6th |
| 1937 | May 30 | I Circuito della Superba | Genoa | - | Maserati 4CM | - | 3rd |
| 1937 | June 13 | Gran Premio di Firenze | Florence | - | Maserati 4CM | - | DNF |
| 1937 | June 20 | II Circuito di Milano | Parco Sempione | - | Maserati | - | 5th |
| 1937 | July 25 | 1937 German Grand Prix | Nürburgring | Graf Salvi del Pero | Alfa Romeo 8C-35 | none | 12th |
| 1937 | August 15 | XIII Coppa Acerbo | Pescara | Graf Selvi del Pero | Alfa Romeo 8C-35 | none | 6th |
| 1937 | September 12 | 1937 Italian Grand Prix | Montenero Circuit | V. Belmondo | Alfa Romeo 8C-35 | none | 10th |
| 1938 | August 7 | Coppa Ciano | Montenero Circuit | "R. Balestrero" | Alfa Romeo Tipo 308 | none | 4th |
| 1938 | August 14 | XIV Coppa Acerbo | Pescara Circuit | - | Alfa Romeo Tipo 308 | - | 3rd |
| 1938 | September 11 | 1938 Italian Grand Prix | Autodromo Nazionale Monza | "R. Balestrero" | Alfa Romeo Tipo 308 | none | NC |

== Sources ==
- Racing Sports Cars
- 1937 AIACR European Driver Championship
- 1938 AIACR European Driver Championship
- kolumbus.fi, Vittorio Belmondo
- motorgraphs.com
- Vittorio Belmondo career summary at DriverDB.com
- kolumbus.fi, Circuits in Italy
