= 1937 Flatenloppet =

The 1937 Flatenloppet was an ice race run on a small lake 7 km (4.3 mi) south of downtown Stockholm on 14 February 1937.

== Classification ==
| Pos | Driver | Car | Laps | Time/Retired |
|---|---|---|---|---|
| 1 | (Norway) Eugen Bjørnstad | Alfa Romeo Monza | 15 | 22:54.0 |
| 2 | (United Kingdom) Ian Connell | ERA B | 15 | + 2:39.7 |
| 3 | (Sweden) Karl-Gustav Sundstedt | Bugatti T35B | 15 | + 2:51.7 |
| 4 | (Finland) Alexi Patama | Ford Special | 15 | + 2:51.7 ? |
| 5 | (Sweden) John Forsberg | Ford Special | 15 | + 5:16.9 |
| 6 | (Sweden) Karl-Emil Rolander | Bugatti T35C | 15 | + 6:28.0 |
| 7 | (Sweden) Helmer Carlsson-Alsed | Alfa Romeo Monza | 15 | + 7:20.4 |
| Ret | (Germany) Herbert Berg | Alfa Romeo Monza | | |
| Ret | (Sweden) Tore Wistedt | MG K3 | | |
| DNS | (Sweden) Axel Johnsson | Bugatti | | |
| DNS | (Sweden) Adolf Westerblom | Amilcar | | |
| DNS | (Finland) Arvo Sorri | Chrysler | | |
