= 1938 Italian Grand Prix =

- Race 4 of 4 in the 1938 European Championship
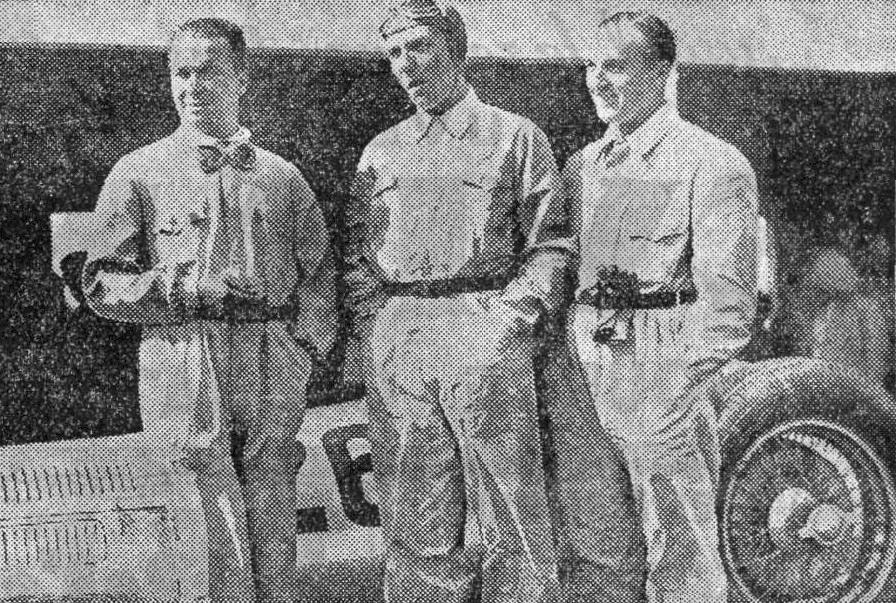

Race details
- Date: 11 September 1938
- Official name: XVI Gran Premio d'Italia
- Location: Autodromo Nazionale di Monza; Monza, Italy
- Course: Permanent racing facility
- Course length: 6.993 km (4.345 miles)
- Distance: 60 laps, 419.58 km (260.71 miles)
- Weather: Warm, sunny

Pole position
| Driver | (Germany) Hermann Lang | Mercedes-Benz |
- Time: 2:32.4

Fastest lap
| Driver | (Germany) Hermann Lang | Mercedes-Benz |
- Time: 2:34.2

Podium
| First | (Italy) Tazio Nuvolari | Auto Union |
| Second | (Italy) Giuseppe Farina | Alfa Romeo |
| Third | (Germany) Rudolf Caracciola; (Germany) Manfred von Brauchitsch | Mercedes-Benz |

The 1938 Italian Grand Prix was a Grand Prix motor race held at Monza on 11 September 1938.

== Classification ==
| Pos | No | Driver | Team | Car | Laps | Time/Retired | Grid | Points |
|---|---|---|---|---|---|---|---|---|
| 1 | 22 | (Italy) Tazio Nuvolari | Auto Union | Auto Union D | 60 | 2:41:39.6 | 5 | 1 |
| 2 | 30 | (Italy) Giuseppe Farina | Alfa Corse | Alfa Romeo Tipo 316 | 59 | +1 Lap | 13 | 2 |
| 3 | 12 | (Germany) Rudolf Caracciola | Daimler-Benz AG | Mercedes-Benz W154 | 57 | +3 Laps | 3 | 3 |
| 3 | 12 | (Germany) Manfred von Brauchitsch | Daimler-Benz AG | Mercedes-Benz W154 | 57 | +3 Laps | 3 | n/a |
| 4 | 6 | (Italy) Clemente Biondetti | Alfa Corse | Alfa Romeo Tipo 316 | 57 | +3 Laps | 8 | 4 |
| Ret | 20 | (Germany) Hermann Paul Müller | Auto Union | Auto Union D | 57 | | 4 | 4 |
| DSQ | 14 | (Italy) Carlo Felice Trossi | Officine A. Maserati | Maserati 8CTF | 56 | Disqualified | 11 | 8 |
| 5 | 2 | (Italy) Pietro Ghersi | Scuderia Torino | Alfa Romeo Tipo 308 | 47 | +13 Laps | 15 | 4 |
| Ret | 36 | (Germany) Hans Stuck | Auto Union | Auto Union D | 41 | Mechanical | 14 | 5 |
| Ret | 26 | (Germany) Hermann Lang | Daimler-Benz AG | Mercedes-Benz W154 | 35 | Engine | 1 | 5 |
| Ret | 8 | (Italy) Luigi Villoresi | Officine A. Maserati | Maserati 8CTF | 24 | Mechanical | 12 | 6 |
| Ret | 4 | (Germany) Manfred von Brauchitsch | Daimler-Benz AG | Mercedes-Benz W154 | 19 | Mechanical | 2 | 6 |
| Ret | 28 | (France) Jean-Pierre Wimille | Alfa Corse | Alfa Romeo Tipo 312 | 17 | | 9 | 6 |
| Ret | 18 | (Italy) Goffredo Zehender | Officine A. Maserati | Maserati 8CTF | 15 | | 16 | 6 |
| Ret | 28 | (Italy) Vittorio Belmondo | Renato Balestrero | Alfa Romeo Tipo 308 | 15 | | 17 | 6 |
| Ret | 16 | (United Kingdom) Richard Seaman | Daimler-Benz AG | Mercedes-Benz W154 | 11 | Engine | 6 | 7 |
| Ret | 34 | (Italy) Piero Taruffi | Alfa Corse | Alfa Romeo Tipo 312 | 10 | Mechanical | 10 | 7 |
| Ret | 24 | (Switzerland) Christian Kautz | Auto Union | Auto Union D | 2 | | 7 | 7 |

Grand Prix Race
| Previous race: 1938 Swiss Grand Prix | 1938 Grand Prix season Grandes Épreuves | Next race: 1939 Belgian Grand Prix |
| Previous race: 1937 Italian Grand Prix | Italian Grand Prix | Next race: 1947 Italian Grand Prix |
