= Circuito del Montenero =

Former motor racing course

Circuito Montenero-Coppa Ciano
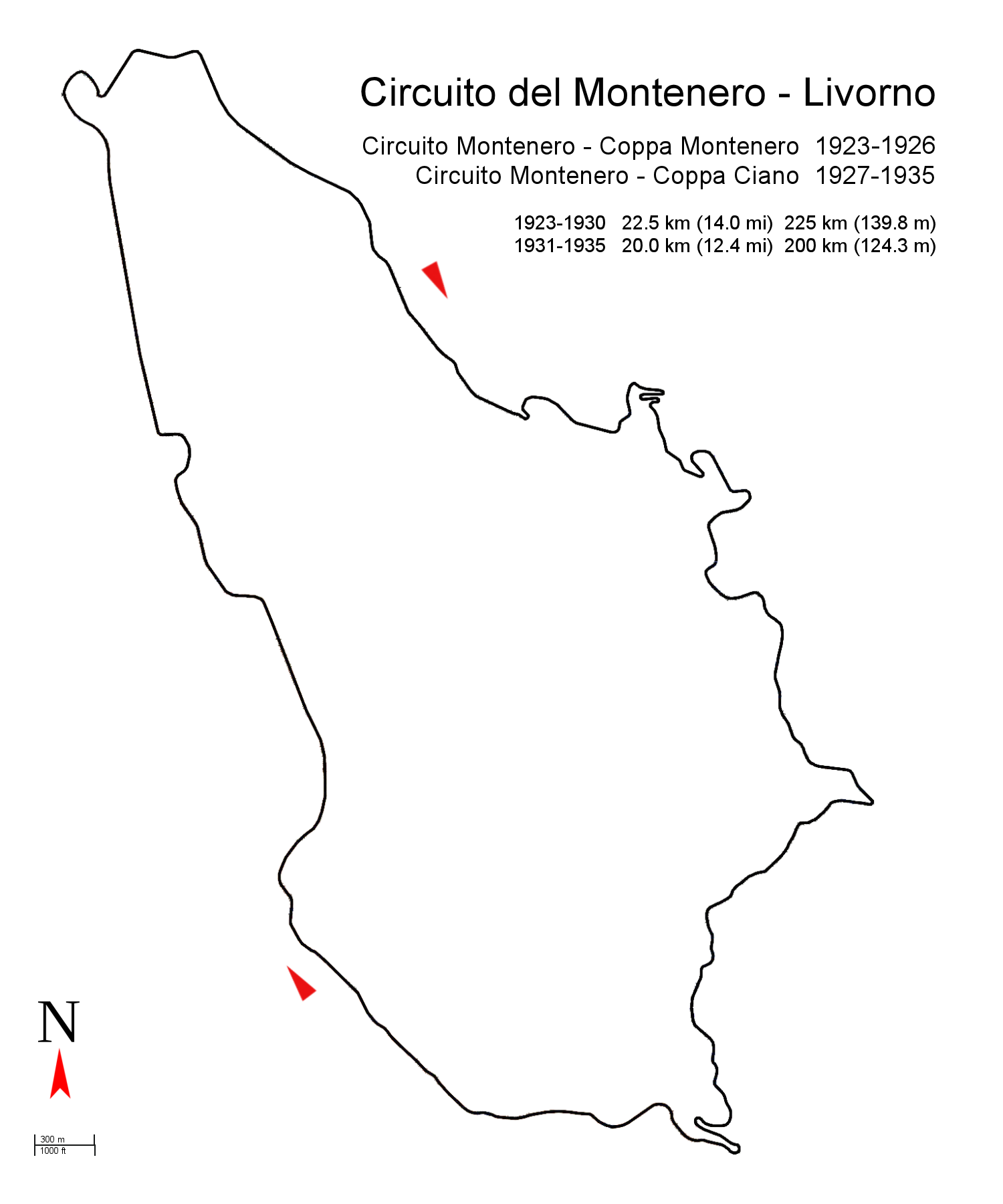
- Montenero Road Course (1922–1935)
- Location: Livorno, Italy
- Coordinates: 43°30′45″N 10°19′2″E
- Major events: Formula Libre - Grand Prix - Voiturette

Montenero Road Course (1922–1935)
- Surface: Asphalt
- Length: 22.5 km (14.0 mi)
- Turns: 164
- Race lap record: 13:27.8 (89.13 km/h) (55.8 mph) ( (Italy) Tazio Nuvolari, Alfa Romeo, 1933, GP)

Circuito Montenero (1936–1937)
- Surface: Asphalt
- Length: 7.218 km (4.485 mi)
- Turns: 14
- Race lap record: 2:44:54 (125.9 km/h) ( (Germany) Rudolf Caracciola, Mercedes, 1937, GP)

Circuito Montenero (1938–1939)
- Surface: Asphalt
- Length: 5.80 km (3.60 mi)
- Turns: 9
- Race lap record: 2:30.10 (139.5 km/h) ( (Italy) Giuseppe Farina, Alfa Romeo, 1939, GP)

Circuito Montenero (1947)
- Surface: Asphalt
- Length: 5.01 km (3.11 mi)
- Turns: 10
- Race lap record: 1:13.51 (101.56 km/h) ( (Italy) Franco Venturi, Cisitalia D46 - Fiat, 1947, Voiturette 1500)

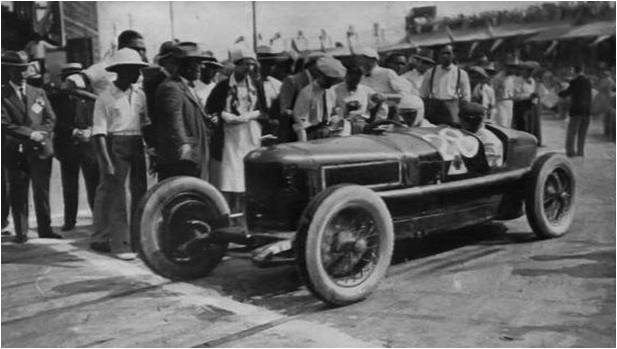
Winning Varzi in P2 on this day

The Montenero Circuit, official name: Circuito del Montenero or sometimes referred to simply as "the Livorno Circuit", was a Grand Prix motor racing road course located at the southern outskirts of Livorno, a city on the mediterranean coast of the Tuscany region in Italy. The venue was best known as the home for the annual Circuito Montenero - Coppa Ciano and the 1937 Italian Grand Prix.

== History ==
The circuit was created in 1921 at the initiative of Paolo Fabbrini, owner of the newspaper Corriere di Livorno to host local sports car races. On September 25 the same year, the first "Coppa Montenero" was held on an 18.5 km long public roads circuit with 164 corners, starting at the seafront "Rotonda" (Parco Bartolini) in the Ardenza district of Livorno, stretching up into the hills of Montenero, climbing to about 300 meters above sea level before returning down to the start/finish line. The circuit was long, with dangerous sections and extremely hard on both man and machine but considered a huge success, attracting interest from regional motoring clubs and the automobile industry alike.

In 1927, Livorno-born politician Costanzo Ciano donated the first "Coppa Ciano" trophy, starting one of the most prestigious Grand Prix racing series to endure for the next 12 years. Like many other circuits of the era, Montenero had to change its layout several times over the years to accommodate the growing demands of racing technology. The last major Circuito Montenero - Coppa Ciano Grand Prix in 1939 also marks the end of the great road course era. Safety concerns, increasingly unmanageable circuit demands, faster cars among other factors left shorter, purpose-built race tracks as the only viable alternative for future Grand Prix venues. One last "Coppa Montenero" was held in 1947 in an attempt to revive the circuit but proved to be financially unsuccessful. A minor sports car race in 1953 was the last event before the track was closed down for good.

== List of events ==
- 1921:
- 1922–1924:
- 1925–1930:
- 1931–1932:
- 1933–1935:
- 1936:
- 1937:
- 1938:
- 1939:
- 1947:

I Circuito Montenero (Coppa Montenero)
Circuito Montenero
Circuito Montenero (I Coppa Ciano 1937)
Circuito Montenero - Coppa Ciano
Circuito Montenero - Coppa Ciano
Circuito Montenero - Coppa Ciano (*)
XV Gran Premio d'Italia (XVII Coppa Ciano)
Circuito Montenero - Coppa Ciano, (Voiturette)
Circuito Montenero - Coppa Ciano
Coppa Montenero

110 km
180 km
225 km
200 km
240 km
216.5 km
360 km
145.0 km
232.0 km
125.0 km

(6 laps - 18.5 km road course)
(8 laps - 22.5 km road course)
(10 laps - 22.5 km road course)
(10 laps - 20 km road course)
(12 laps - 20 km road course)
(30 laps - 7.218 km street circuit)
(50 laps - 7.218 km street circuit)
(25 laps - 5.8 km street circuit)
(40 laps - 5.8 km street circuit)
(25 laps - 5.01 km street circuit)

(*) The mountain section of the circuit was dropped from 1936 to 1947

== Circuito Montenero by year ==
Year	Race Name	Dist.	Circuit	Formula	Driver	Manufacturer	Time	Report
1921	I Circuito del Montenero	109.2 km	18.5 km	2000cc	(Italy) Corrado Lotti	Ansaldo 2000	2:44:26	Report
1922	II Circuito Montenero	180 km	22.5 km	Formula Libre	(Italy) Carlo Masetti	Bugatti 37 1500	2:52:42	Report
1923	III Circuito Montenero	180 km	22.5 km	Formula Libre	(Italy) Mario Razzauti	Ansaldo 2000	2:52:42	Report
1924	IV Circuito Montenero	180 km	22.5 km	Formula Libre	(Italy) Renato Balestrero	OM 665	2:34:58	Report
1925	V Circuito Montenero	225 km	22.5 km	Formula Libre	(Italy) Emilio Materassi	Itala Special	3:16:40	Report
1926	VI Circuito Montenero	225 km	22.5 km	Formula Libre	(Italy) Emilio Materassi	Itala Special	2:55:10	Report
1927	VII Circuito Montenero	225 km	22.5 km	Formula Libre	(Italy) Emilio Materassi	Bugatti T35C	2:45:18	Report
1927	I Coppa Ciano (Sport)	225 km	22.5 km	Sports car	(Italy) Attilio Marinoni	Alfa Romeo 6C-1500	2:52:42	Report
1928	VIII Circuito Montenero	225 km	22.5 km	Grand Prix	(Italy) Emilio Materassi	Talbot 700	2:38:57	Report
1928	II Coppa Ciano (Sport)	225 km	22.5 km	Sports car	(Italy) Mario Razzauti	Alfa Romeo 6C-1500	2:52:42	Report
1929	IX (Circuito Montenero) Coppa Ciano	225 km	22.5 km	Grand Prix	(Italy) Achille Varzi	Alfa Romeo P2	2:38:51	Report
1930	X (Circuito Montenero) Coppa Ciano	225 km	22.5 km	Grand Prix	(Italy) Luigi Fagioli	Maserati 26M	2:33:50	Report
1931	XI (Circuito Montenero) Coppa Ciano	200 km	20.0 km	Grand Prix	(Italy) Tazio Nuvolari	Alfa Romeo 8C 2300 Monza	2:23:40	Report
1932	XII (Circuito Montenero) Coppa Ciano	200 km	20.0 km	Grand Prix	(Italy) Tazio Nuvolari	Alfa Romeo Tipo-B 'P3'	2:18:19	Report
1933	XIII (Circuito Montenero) Coppa Ciano	240 km	20.0 km	Grand Prix	(Italy) Tazio Nuvolari	Maserati 8CM	2:45:08	Report
1934	XIV (Circuito Montenero) Coppa Ciano	240 km	20.0 km	Grand Prix	(Italy) Achille Varzi	Alfa Romeo Tipo-B 'P3'	2:49:52	Report
1935	XV (Circuito Montenero) Coppa Ciano	240 km	20.0 km	Grand Prix	(Italy) Tazio Nuvolari	Alfa Romeo Tipo-B 'P3'	2:42:08	Report
1936	XVI (Circuito Montenero) Coppa Ciano	216.5 km	7.218 km	Grand Prix	(Italy) Nuvolari / Pintacuda	Alfa Romeo 8C-35	1:44:54.4	Report
1937	XVII (Circuito Montenero) Coppa Ciano *	360.0 km	7.218 km	Grand Prix	(Germany) Rudolf Caracciola	Mercedes-Benz W125	2:44:54.4	Report
1938	XVIII (Circuito Montenero) Coppa Ciano	232.0 km	5.80 km	Grand Prix	(Germany) Hermann Lang	Mercedes-Benz W154	1:00:35.2	Report
1938	XVIII (Circuito Montenero) Coppa Ciano	145.0 km	5.80 km	Voiturette	(Italy) Emilio Villoresi	Maserati 6CM	1:05:21.6	Report
1939	XIX (Circuito Montenero) Coppa Ciano	348.0 km	5.80 km	Grand Prix	(Italy) Giuseppe Farina	Alfa Romeo 158	2:30:10.4	Report
1940–1946 (Not held)
1947	XX Coppa Montenero	125.0 km	5.01 km	Voiturette	(Italy) Franco Venturi	Cisitalia D46 - Fiat	1:13:51.2	Report
* (AIACR European Driver Championship round) - Sources:

== Montenero circuit maps ==
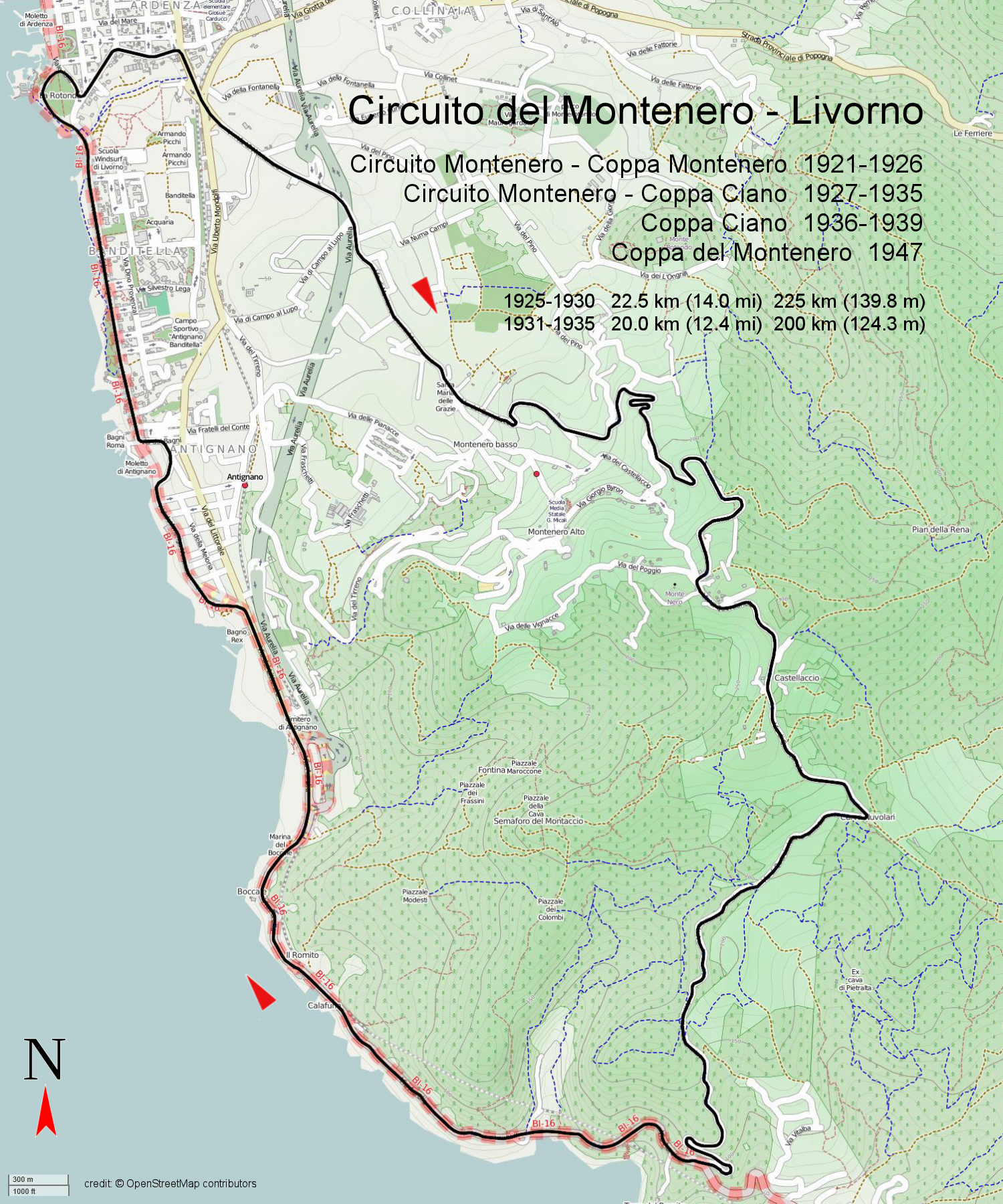
Circuito Montenero (1922–1935)

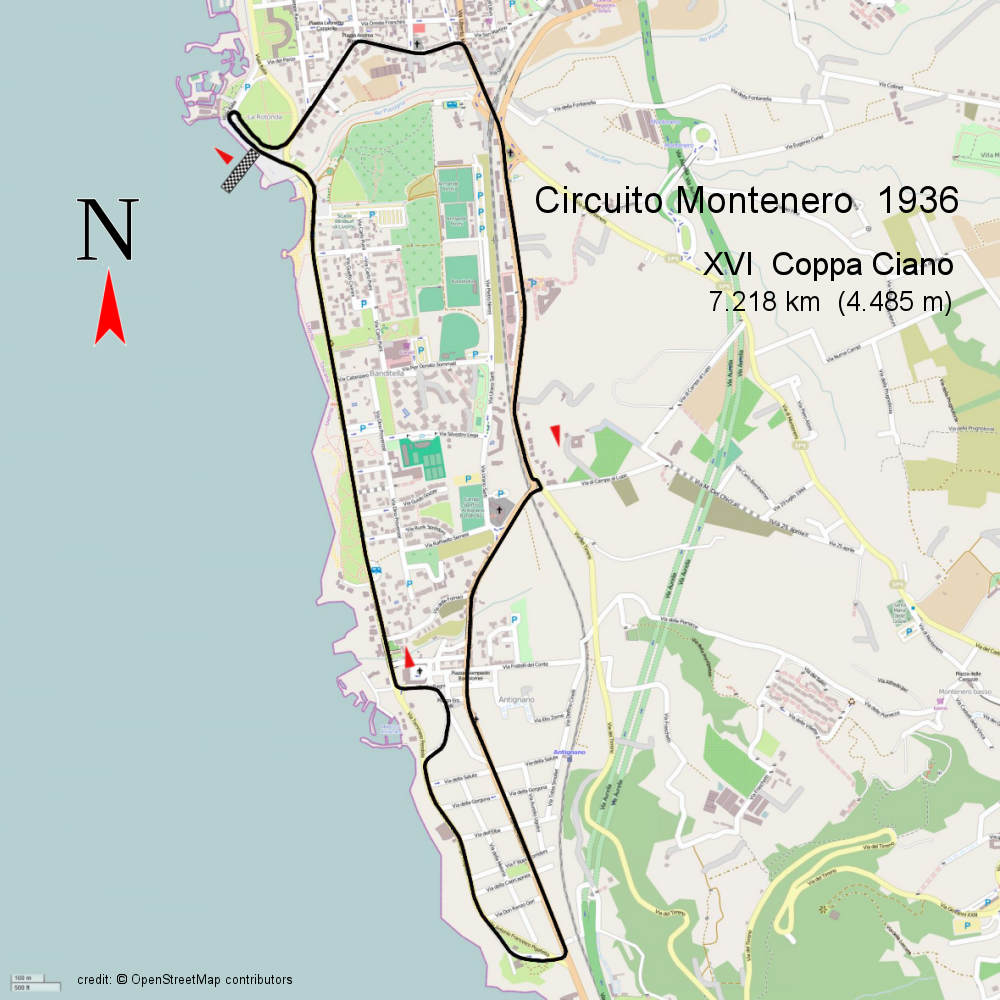
Circuito Montenero (1936)

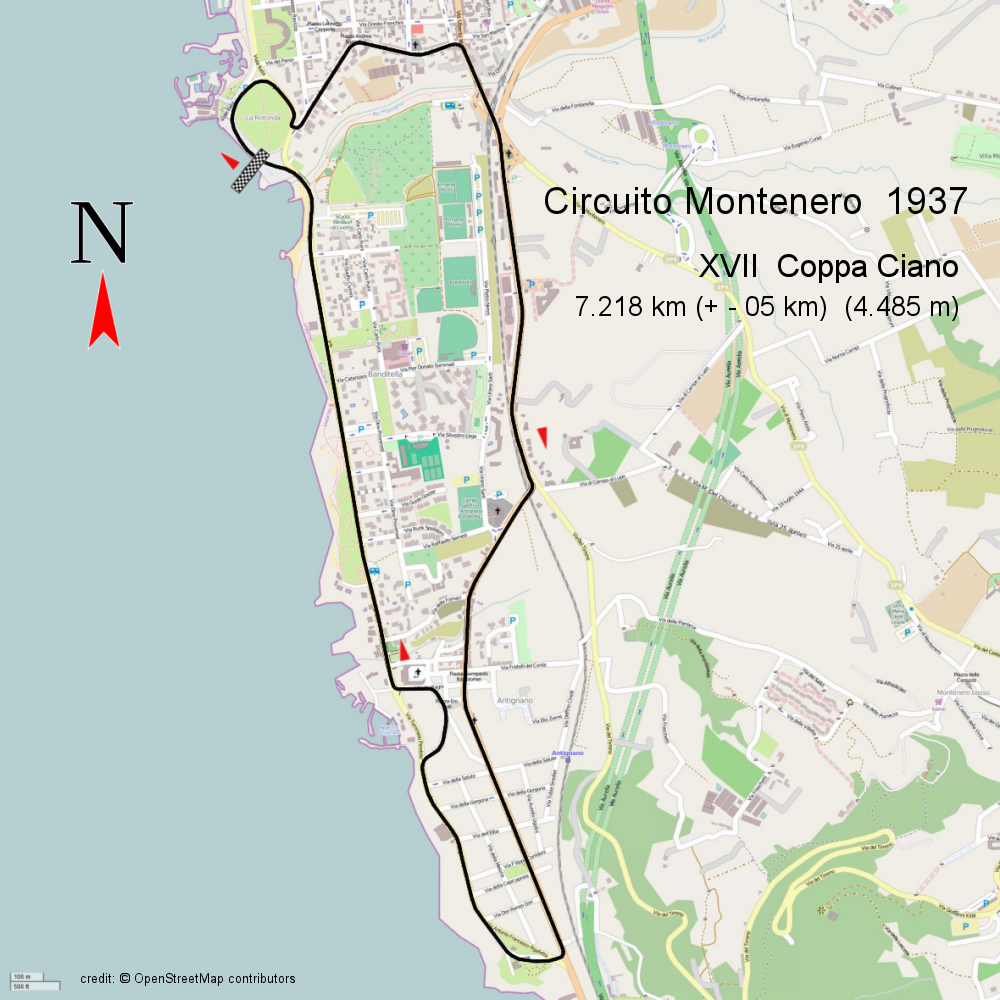
Circuito Montenero (1937)

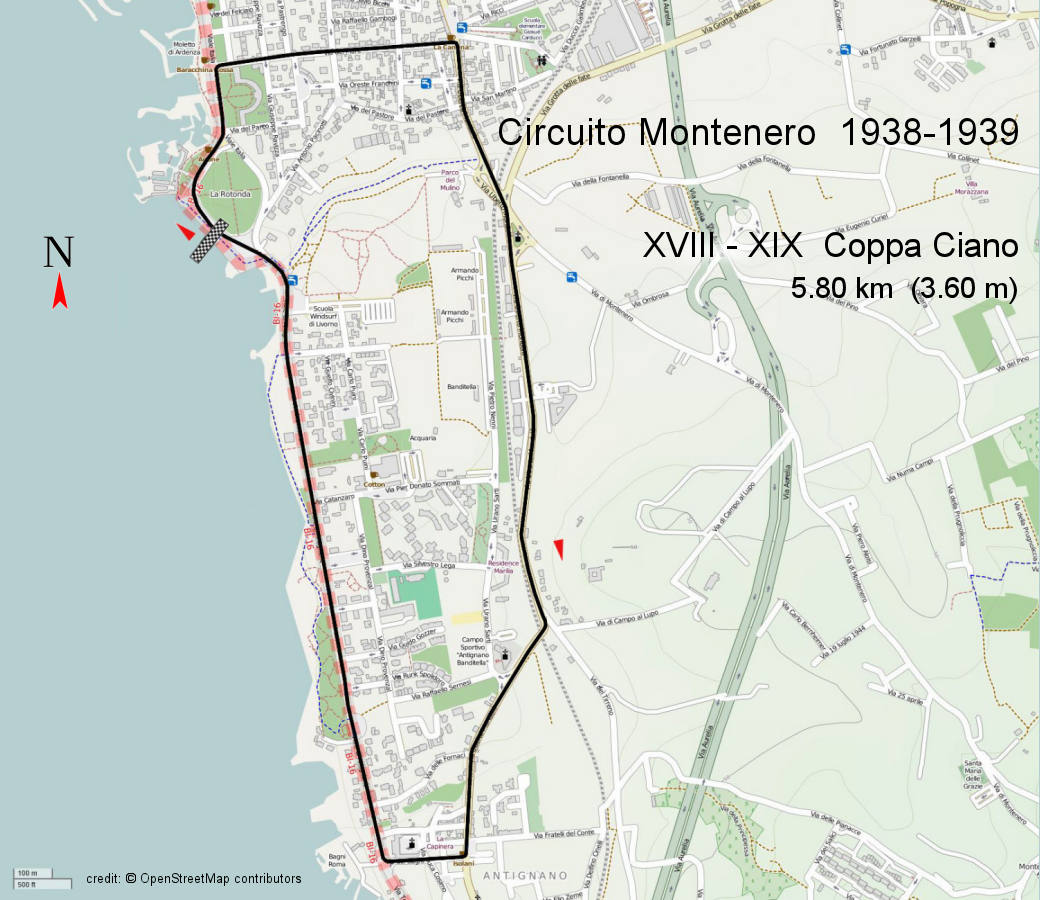
Circuito Montenero (1938–1939)

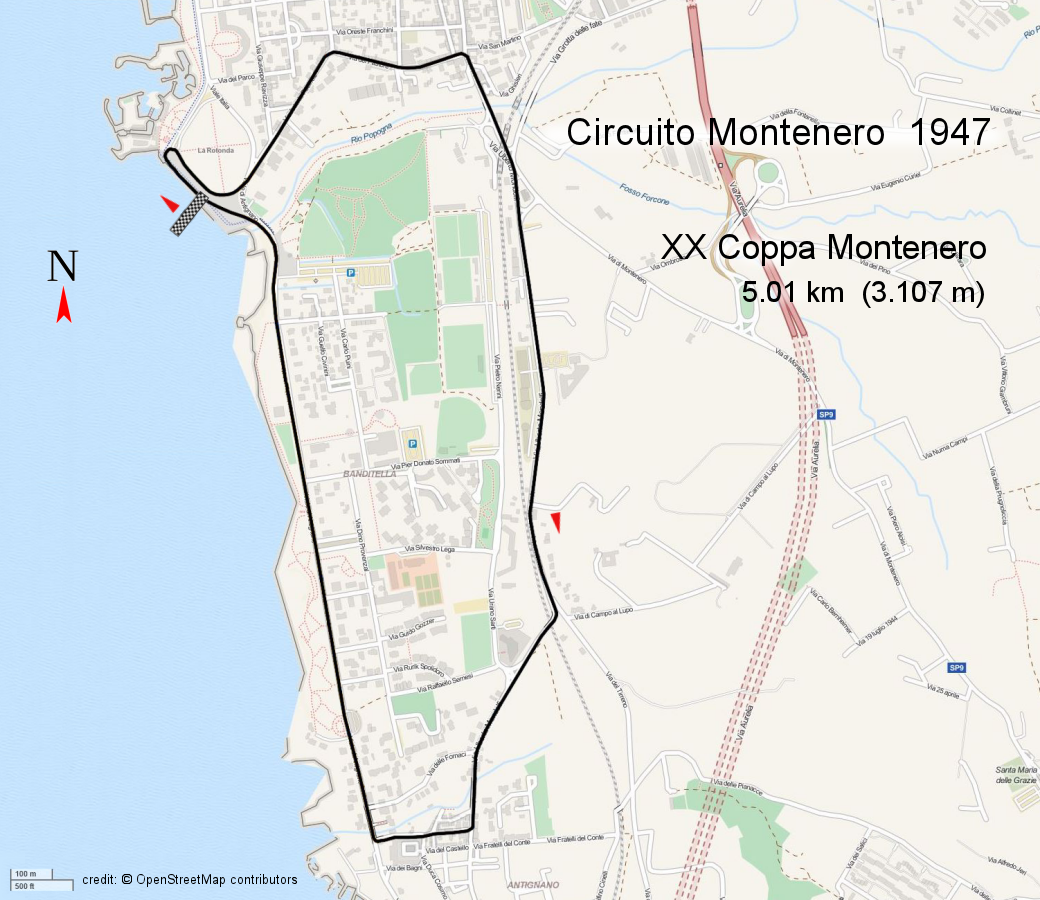
Street Map - Montenero Circuit (1947)

== Notes ==
- Circuit data for 'Fast Lap' (if available) is inconsistent.
- Times given are for the completed race.
- Fastest drivers for the major circuit variants are determined by median speed average
- Race (event) numbering is adopted from "Circuito del Montenero Coppa Ciano" (Italian)

Inconsistencies and discrepancies in Grand Prix era race numbering were often due to political conflicts between regional municipalities and national sanctioning bodies. (example: Grand Prix de la Marne vs Grand Prix de Reims vs Grand Prix de l'ACF
