= Franz Gouvion =

Belgian racing driver

Franz Gouvion was a Belgian racing driver, active before the Second World War.

== Career ==
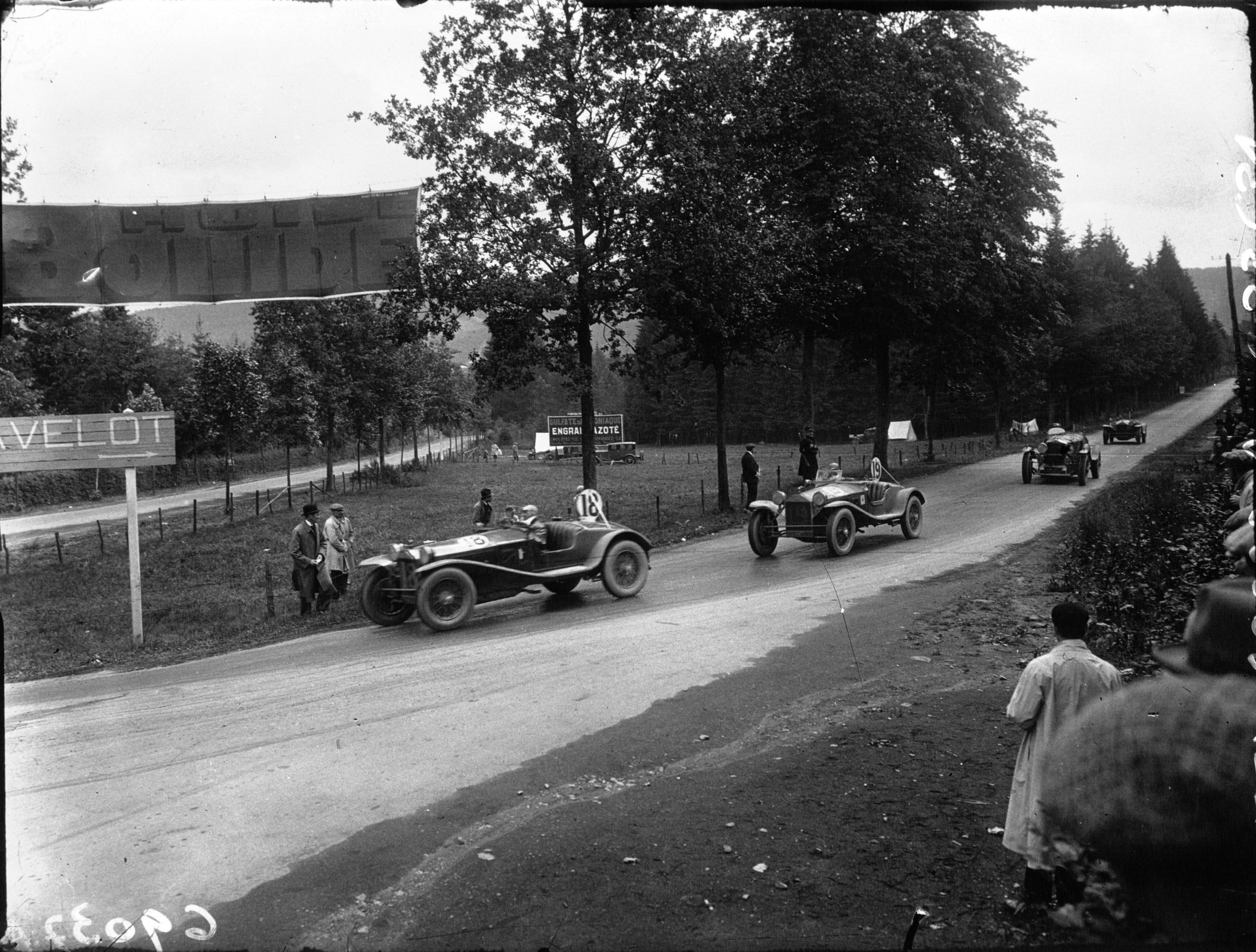
The Gouvion/Swaelens Lancia Lambda leading a run of cars at the 1929 Spa 24 Hours

Gouvion was the Belgian representative for Lancia, and the first Belgian to drive at over 200 km/h. The bulk of his races were sportscar races in his native country. He was a regular entrant to the 24 Hours of Spa between 1928 and 1938, his best result coming in 1929, when he and Swaelens finished 4th in a Lancia Lambda.

He also entered for two Grands Prix, both in Belgium; the 1930 event, in a Lombard AL3 sportscar stripped down for racing, and the 1937 event, in a Maserati 8CL. In the former event, his car had much the smallest engine in the field, and he was lapped by a quarter distance. He did not finish, due to running out of fuel just before the end, even though, with five laps to go, he was five laps behind the leaders, and stone last. In the latter, he was the oldest entrant, but a blown engine prevented him from starting.

After the Second World War, Gouvion added an Alfa Romeo distributorship to his business, and in May 1949 was one of the first buyers of a Ferrari (an example of the 166MM model).

== Results ==
- Sports car results
