= 1937 Monaco Grand Prix =

Coordinates: 43°44′4.74″N 7°25′16.8″E

Race 3 of 5 in the 1937 European Championship
← Previous race	Next race →
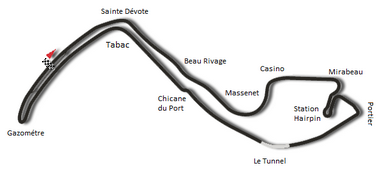

Race details
- Date: 8 August 1937
- Official name: IX Grand Prix de Monaco
- Location: Circuit de Monaco; Monte Carlo
- Course: Street circuit
- Course length: 3.180 km (1.976 miles)
- Distance: 100 laps, 318.0 km (197.6 miles)

Pole position
Driver	(Germany) Rudolf Caracciola	Mercedes-Benz
- Time: 1:47.5

Fastest lap
Driver	(Germany) Rudolf Caracciola	Mercedes-Benz
- Time: 1:46.5

Podium
First	(Germany) Manfred von Brauchitsch	Mercedes-Benz
Second	(Germany) Rudolf Caracciola	Mercedes-Benz
Third	(Switzerland) Christian Kautz	Mercedes-Benz

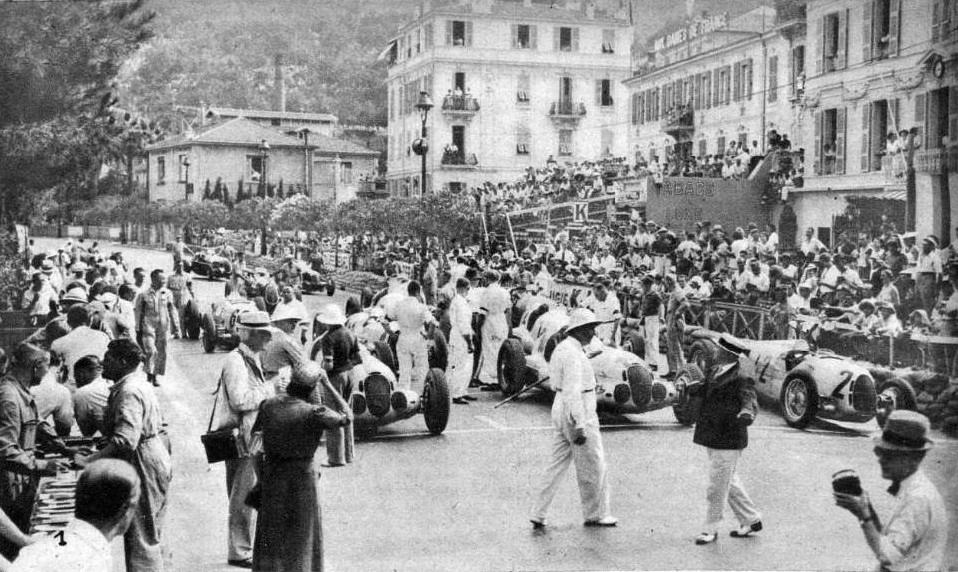
The start

The 1937 Monaco Grand Prix was a Grand Prix motor race held at the Circuit de Monaco on 8 August 1937. The 100 lap event was won by Manfred von Brauchitsch.

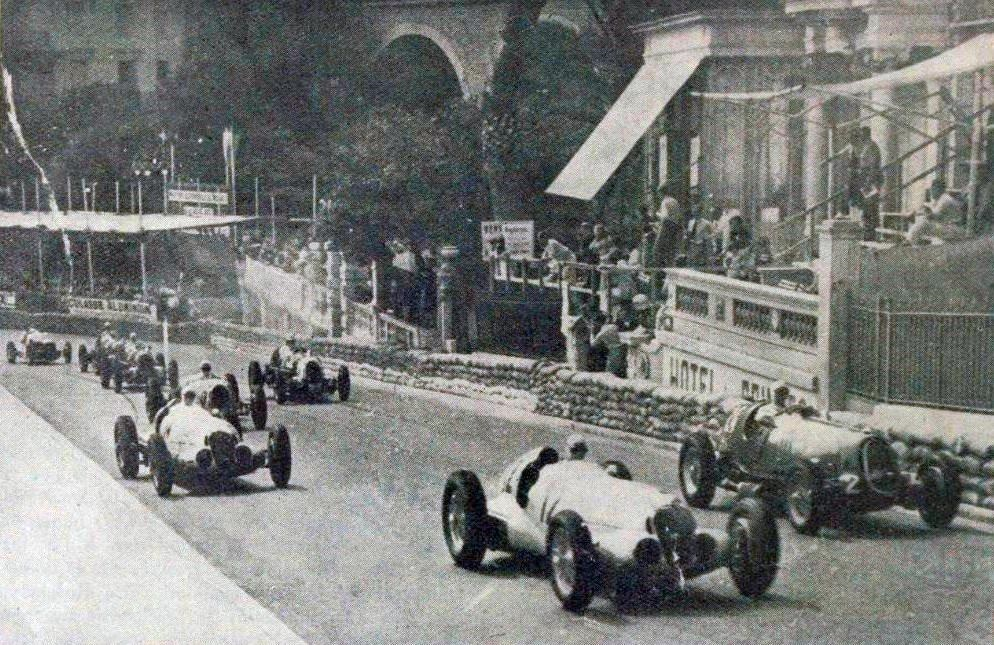
Just after the start of the race

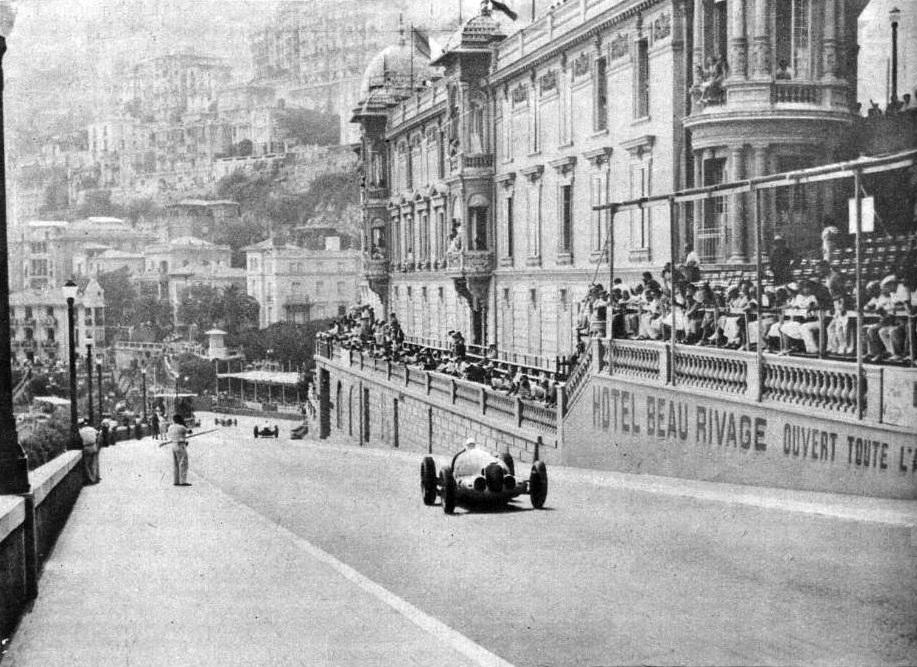
Rudolf Caracciola

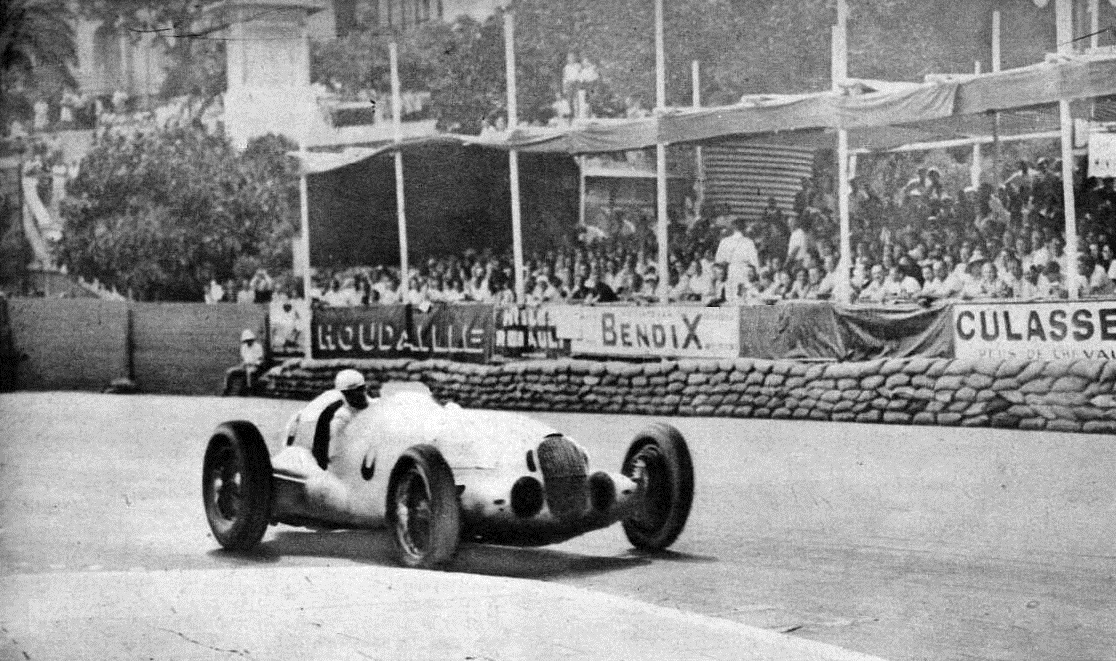
Caracciola

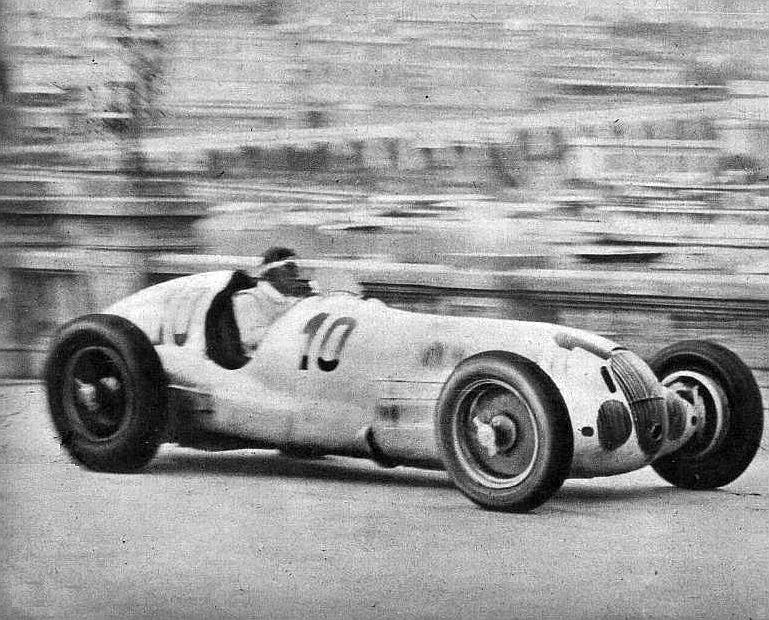
Manfred von Brauchitsch, the winner

== Classification ==
Pos	No	Driver	Team	Car	Laps	Time/Retired	Grid	Points
1	10	(Germany) Manfred von Brauchitsch	Daimler-Benz AG	Mercedes-Benz W125	100	3:07:23.9	2	1
2	8	(Germany) Rudolf Caracciola	Daimler-Benz AG	Mercedes-Benz W125	100	+1:24.3	1	2
3	12	(Switzerland) Christian Kautz	Daimler-Benz AG	Mercedes-Benz W125	98	+2 Laps	5	3
4	4	(Germany) Hans Stuck	Auto Union	Auto Union C	97	+3 Laps	4	4
4	4	(Germany) Bernd Rosemeyer	Auto Union	Auto Union C	97	+3 Laps	4	n/a
5	14	(Italy) Goffredo Zehender	Daimler-Benz AG	Mercedes-Benz W125	97	+3 Laps	7	4
6	24	(Italy) Giuseppe Farina	Scuderia Ferrari	Alfa Romeo 12C-36	97	+3 Laps	8	4
7	18	(France) Raymond Sommer	Private entry	Alfa Romeo 8C-35	95	+5 Laps	12	4
8	32	(Switzerland) Hans Ruesch	Private entry	Alfa Romeo 8C-35	92	+8 Laps	10	4
9	26	(Italy) Carlo Maria Pintacuda	Scuderia Ferrari	Alfa Romeo 8C-35	87	+13 Laps	9	4
Ret	20	(Hungary) László Hartmann	Private entry	Maserati 8CM	69	Engine	13	5
Ret	28	(Italy) Clemente Biondetti	Scuderia Maremmana	Maserati 6C-34	27	Engine	15	6
Ret	22	(Italy) Antonio Brivio	Scuderia Ferrari	Alfa Romeo 12C-36	21	Radiator	11	7
Ret	2	(Germany) Bernd Rosemeyer	Auto Union	Auto Union C	19	Steering	3	7
Ret	30	(Italy) Luigi Soffietti	Private entry	Maserati 6C-34	3	Fuel feed	14	7
Ret	6	(Germany) Rudolf Hasse	Auto Union	Auto Union C	1	Accident	6	7
DNS	16	(Germany) Paul Pietsch	Private entry	Maserati 6C-34		Oil leak		8

Grand Prix Race
Previous race: 1937 German Grand Prix	1937 Grand Prix season Grandes Épreuves	Next race: 1937 Swiss Grand Prix
Previous race: 1936 Monaco Grand Prix	Monaco Grand Prix	Next race: 1948 Monaco Grand Prix
