= 1937 Swiss Grand Prix =

Race 4 of 5 in the 1937 European Championship
← Previous race	Next race →

Race details
- Date: 22 August 1937
- Official name: IV Großer Preis der Schweiz
- Location: Bremgarten; Bern, Switzerland
- Course: Road course
- Course length: 7.28 km (4.52 miles)
- Distance: 50 laps, 364.00 km (226.18 miles)
- Weather: Wet, drying

Pole position
Driver	(Germany) Rudolf Caracciola	Mercedes-Benz
- Time: 2:32.0

Fastest lap
Driver	(Germany) Bernd Rosemeyer	Auto Union
- Time: 2:36.1

Podium
First	(Germany) Rudolf Caracciola	Mercedes-Benz
Second	(Germany) Hermann Lang	Mercedes-Benz
Third	(Germany) Manfred von Brauchitsch	Mercedes-Benz

The 1937 Swiss Grand Prix was a 750 kg Formula race held on 22 August 1937 at the Bremgarten Circuit.

== Race Report ==
After the start, Hans Stuck chopped across the nose of the other drivers to take the early lead, followed by Caracciola and Rosemeyer. Rosemeyer was soon in trouble though, under pressure from Lang he skidded off the circuit and was bogged down in the wet ground. Some spectators came to his assistance but their help would have resulted in a disqualification so he retired his car.

Stuck could not maintain his early pace under pressure from the Mercedes' and was soon passed by Caracciola, Lang and von Brauchitsch.

Nuvolari drove for the Auto Union team for this race as he wasn't impressed with the new Alfa. However, the tricky rear-engined Auto Union was not a car to race without some practice, even for a man of Nuvolari's skill. The wet track simply compounded his problems. Whilst running in 8th place he was called into the pits and the car-less Rosemeyer took over, eventually getting up to 5th place and putting in the fastest lap in his chase after the Mercedes'.

Fagioli was also having problems being in some pain with his hip, when he retired Nuvolari decided to give it another go and brought the car home 7th.

In the closing laps Lang closed on Caracciola but was ordered to maintain position and von Brauchitsch passed Stuck for a Mercedes 1,2,3.

== Classification ==
Pos	No	Driver	Team	Car	Laps	Time/Retired	Grid	Points
1	14	(Germany) Rudolf Caracciola	Daimler-Benz AG	Mercedes-Benz W125	50	2:17:39.3	1	1
2	18	(Germany) Hermann Lang	Daimler-Benz AG	Mercedes-Benz W125	50	+ 29.4	5	2
3	12	(Germany) Manfred von Brauchitsch	Daimler-Benz AG	Mercedes-Benz W125	50	+ 1:06.4	4	3
4	10	(Germany) Hans Stuck	Auto Union	Auto Union C	50	+ 1:07.5	3	4
5	6	(Italy) Tazio Nuvolari	Auto Union	Auto Union C	50	+ 1:21.2	7	4
5	6	(Germany) Bernd Rosemeyer	Auto Union	Auto Union C	50	+ 1:21.2	7	n/a
6	16	(Switzerland) Christian Kautz	Daimler-Benz AG	Mercedes-Benz W125	49	+ 1 Lap	9	4
7	4	(Italy) Luigi Fagioli	Auto Union	Auto Union C	49	+ 1 Lap	8	4
7	4	(Italy) Tazio Nuvolari	Auto Union	Auto Union C	49	+ 1 Lap	8	n/a
8	22	(France) Raymond Sommer	Scuderia Ferrari	Alfa Romeo 12C-36	47	+ 3 Laps	10	4
9	38	(Hungary) László Hartmann	Private entry	Maserati 6CM/4CM	42	+ 8 Laps	13	4
10	2	(Germany) Paul Pietsch	Private entry	Maserati 6C-34	41	+ 9 Laps	12	4
Ret	32	(Switzerland) Henri Simonet	Private entry	Alfa Romeo Tipo B	35		16	5
Ret	36	(Switzerland) Adolfo Mandirola	Ecurie Genevoise	Maserati 8CM	28	Mechanical	17	5
Ret	20	(Italy) Giovanni Minozzi	Private entry	Alfa Romeo Monza	26	Mechanical	14	5
Ret	24	(Italy) Giuseppe Farina	Scuderia Ferrari	Alfa Romeo 12C-36	22	Rear axle	6	6
Ret	40	(Switzerland) Hans Ruesch	Private entry	Alfa Romeo 8C-35	8	Cracked cylinder	11	7
Ret	30	(Switzerland) Max Christen	Private entry	Maserati Tipo 26	4	Mechanical	15	7
Ret	8	(Germany) Bernd Rosemeyer	Auto Union	Auto Union C	1	Outside assistance	2	7

Grand Prix Race
Previous race: 1937 Monaco Grand Prix	1937 Grand Prix season Grandes Épreuves	Next race: 1937 Italian Grand Prix
Previous race: 1936 Swiss Grand Prix	Swiss Grand Prix	Next race: 1938 Swiss Grand Prix
