= Maserati 6C 34 =

Open-wheel Grand Prix motor racing car

Maserari 6C-34
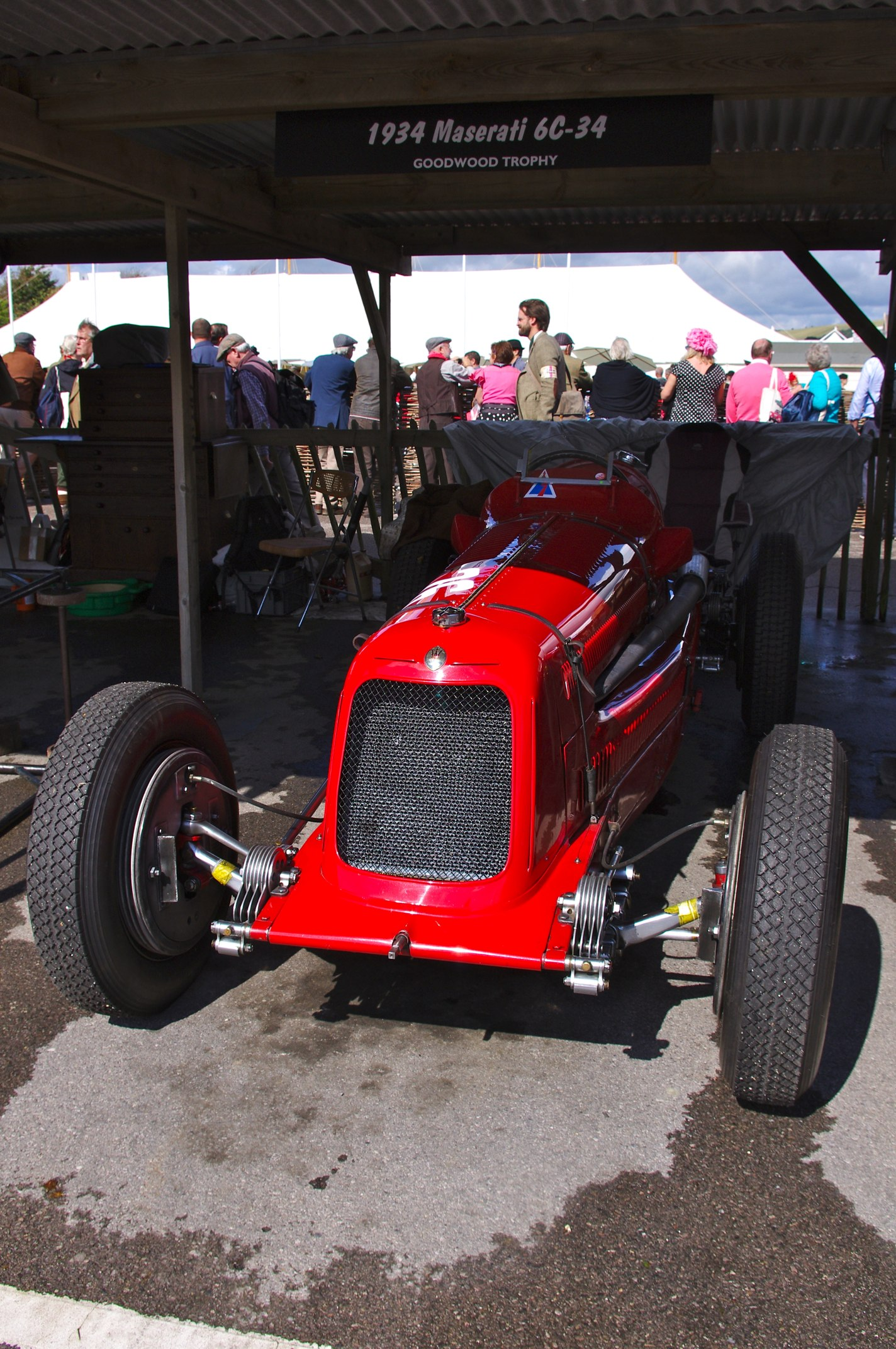
- Designer: Maserati
- Production: 1934-1935
- Predecessor: Maserati 8CM
- Successor: Maserati V8RI

Technical specifications
- Chassis: Steel ladder frame, aluminum body
- Suspension: Live axle, semi-elliptic leaf springs, friction shock absorbers
- Length: 3,850 mm (152 in)
- Width: 1,570 mm (62 in)
- Height: 1,200 mm (47 in)
- Axle track: 1,300 mm (51 in) (front & rear)
- Wheelbase: 2,560 mm (101 in)
- Engine: 12-valve DOHC supercharged straight-6 3.7 L (3,724.1 cc) Front-engine, rear-wheel drive supercharged longitudinal
- Transmission: Manual 4-speed + reverse
- Power: 270 hp (200 kW; 270 PS)
- Weight: 750 kg (1,650 lb)

Competition history

The Maserati 6C 34 is a 750 kg open-wheel Grand Prix race car, designed, developed and built by Maserati from 1934 to 1935.

== Racing history ==
The 6C 34 was equipped with an in-line six-cylinder engine that was 30 hp (22 kW; 30 PS) more powerful, and 13 kg lighter, compared to the eight-cylinder installed on the 8CM.

Only five days after the completion of the engine tests on the dyno, the 6C 34 made its racing debut at the 1934 Italian Grand Prix where, due to brake problems, the car did not perform well. At the following Grand Prix, on the Masaryk Circuit, the 6C 34 driven by Tazio Nuvolari finished third, surpassed by the elusive Mercedes-Benz and Auto Union, but ahead of the Alfa Romeo P3.

In 1935 adjustments were made to the chassis to stiffen it, and new suspensions were tested, which were now independent wheels and with the Parisi system.

The experience of the 6C 34 in racing ended as a semi-official car for the Scuderia Subalpina, driven by Achille Varzi, Pietro Ghersi, and Eugenio Siena, achieving important placings but no victory.

== Design ==
The ignition was single with a Spark or Bosch magnet. It is supercharged with a Roots-type compressor and a Weber-type 55AS1 carburetor, the latter mounted upstream of the compressor itself. The distribution was with two valves per cylinder arranged in a 90°V, and dual overhead camshafts. Lubrication was forced with delivery and recovery pumps. The cooling system was a water circulation with centrifugal pumps.

The engine was an inline-six cylinder and had a displacement of 3,724.1 cm^{3} (227.26 cu in). The bore and stroke were 84 and 112 mm (3.3 and 4.4 in) respectively, while the compression ratio was 6.4:1. This engine produced a power of 270 hp (200 kW; 270 PS) at 5,300 rpm.

The brakes were drum brakes on the wheels with hydraulic control, while the suspensions consisted of leaf springs, friction shock absorbers, and a stabilizer bar, subsequently implemented with independent wheels and with the Parisi system. The steering was a worm screw and toothed sector, while the transmission consisted of a four-speed gearbox plus reverse.

The bodywork was single-seater in aluminum, while the chassis was made up of two side members and cross members in steel profiles.

The “6C 34” reached a top speed of 250 km/h (160 mph).

== Technical Data ==
Technical data	6C 34
Engine:	Front mounted supercharged Straight-6
Displacement	3,724 cm^{3} (227.3 cu in)
Bore x stroke:	84 mm × 112 mm (3.3 in × 4.4 in)
Max power:	270 hp (200 kW; 270 PS) at 5,300 rpm
Valve control:	DOHC, 2 valves per cylinder
Compression:	6.4:1
Carburetor:	Weber-type 55AS1
Induction:	Roots compressor
Gearbox:	4-speed manual, transaxle
Front suspension:	Live axle, semi-elliptic leaf springs, friction shock absorbers
Rear suspension:	Live axle, semi-elliptic leaf springs, friction shock absorbers
Brakes:	Hydraulic drum brakes
Chassis & body:	Steel ladder frame, aluminum body
Wheelbase:	2,560 mm (101 in)
Dry weight:	750 kg (1,650 lb)
Top speed:	250 km/h (160 mph)
