= 1937 Italian Grand Prix =

Race 5 of 5 in the 1937 European Championship
← Previous race
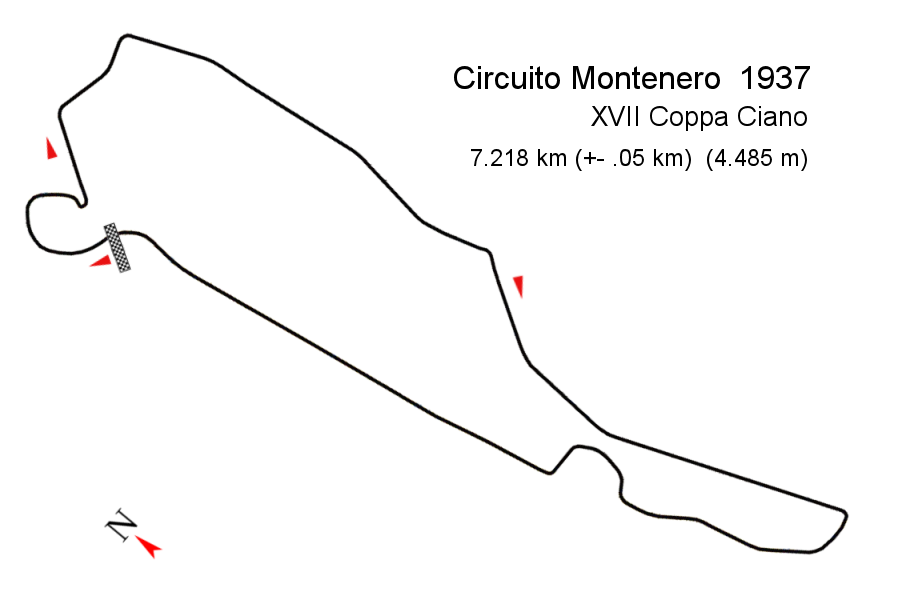

Race details
- Date: 12 September 1937
- Official name: XV Gran Premio d'Italia
- Location: Circuito del Montenero; Livorno, Italy
- Course: Permanent racing facility
- Course length: 7.218 km (4.485 miles)
- Distance: 50 laps, 360.90 km (224.25 miles)

Pole position
Driver	(Germany) Rudolf Caracciola	Mercedes-Benz
- Time: 3:11.0

Fastest lap
Drivers	(Germany) Rudolf Caracciola	Mercedes-Benz
	(Germany) Hermann Lang	Mercedes-Benz
- Time: 3:11

Podium
First	(Germany) Rudolf Caracciola	Mercedes-Benz
Second	(Germany) Hermann Lang	Mercedes-Benz
Third	(Germany) Bernd Rosemeyer	Auto Union

The 1937 Italian Grand Prix was a "750 kg Formula" Grand Prix race held on 12 September 1937 at the Montenero Circuit in Livorno.

== Race report ==
Caracciola took an early lead from pole, Lang was second but he soon took the lead from Caracciola, the two Mercedes drivers pushing each other hard. Team manager Alfred Neubauer was not impressed by the internal fighting. The partisan crowd were disappointed when the Italian Nuvolari retired and gave his car to Farina.

Von Brauchitsch and Kautz were out, the two leading Mercedes had a fierce fight to the flag with Caracciola blocking any attempt to pass by Lang. Rosemeyer couldn't match their pace and Caracciola held on for a win with Lang just 0.4s behind him at the flag.

== Classification ==
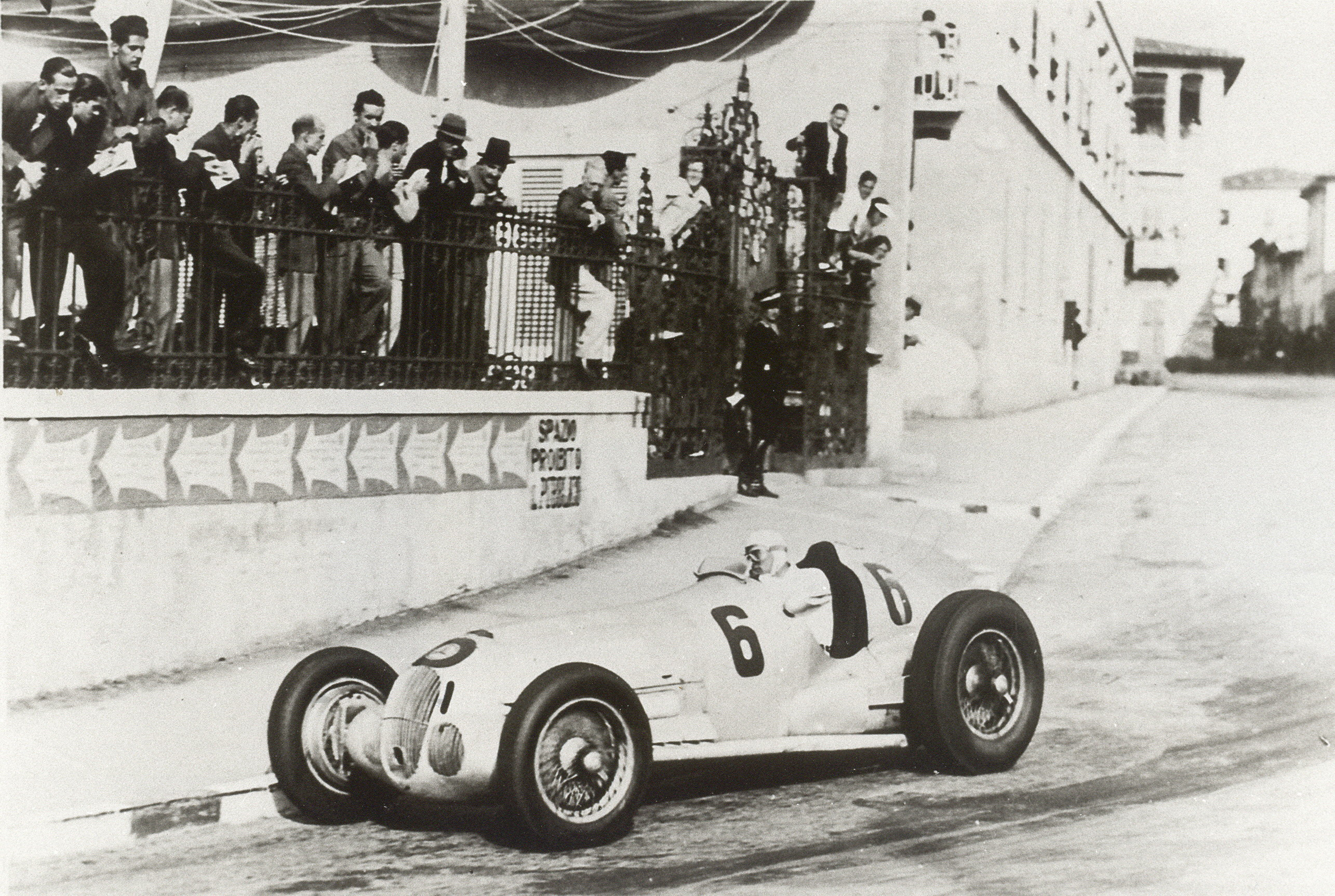
Hermann Lang, Mercedes-Benz W125

Pos	No	Driver	Team	Car	Laps	Time/Retired	Grid	Points
1	2	(Germany) Rudolf Caracciola	Daimler-Benz AG	Mercedes-Benz W125	50	2:44:54.4	1	1
2	6	(Germany) Hermann Lang	Daimler-Benz AG	Mercedes-Benz W125	50	+ 0.4	4	2
3	12	(Germany) Bernd Rosemeyer	Auto Union	Auto Union C	50	+ 2:25.4	3	3
4	8	(United Kingdom) Richard Seaman	Daimler-Benz AG	Mercedes-Benz W125	49	+ 1 Lap	8	4
5	18	(Germany) Hermann Paul Müller	Auto Union	Auto Union C	49	+ 1 Lap	10	4
6	14	(Italy) Achille Varzi	Auto Union	Auto Union C	49	+ 1 Lap	2	4
7	22	(Italy) Tazio Nuvolari	Scuderia Ferrari	Alfa Romeo 12C-36	49	+ 1 Lap	7	4
7	22	(Italy) Giuseppe Farina	Scuderia Ferrari	Alfa Romeo 12C-36	49	+ 1 Lap	7	n/a
8	26	(Italy) Carlo Felice Trossi	Scuderia Ferrari	Alfa Romeo 12C-36	47	+ 3 Laps	9	4
9	16	(Germany) Hans Stuck	Auto Union	Auto Union C	47	+ 3 Laps	5	4
9	16	(Germany) Rudolf Hasse	Auto Union	Auto Union C	47	+ 3 Laps	5	n/a
10	20	(Italy) Vittorio Belmondo	Private entry	Alfa Romeo C	45	+ 5 Laps	15	4
DNF	10	(Switzerland) Christian Kautz	Daimler-Benz AG	Mercedes-Benz W125	43		14	4
DNF	28	(Italy) Clemente Biondetti	Private entry	Alfa Romeo C	38		13	4
DNF	4	(Germany) Manfred von Brauchitsch	Daimler-Benz AG	Mercedes-Benz W125	36	Mechanical	6	5
DNF	30	(Italy) Giovanbattista Guidotti	Alfa Corse	Alfa Romeo 12C-37	24	Mechanical	11	6
DNF	24	(Italy) Giuseppe Farina	Scuderia Ferrari	Alfa Romeo 12C-36	13	Mechanical	12	6
* (AIACR European Driver Championship round) - Sources:

Grand Prix Race
Previous race: 1937 Swiss Grand Prix	1937 Grand Prix season Grandes Épreuves	Next race: 1938 French Grand Prix
Previous race: 1936 Italian Grand Prix	Italian Grand Prix	Next race: 1938 Italian Grand Prix
