= 1937 Belgian Grand Prix =

Motor race held at Spa-Francorchamps on 11 July 1937

Race 1 of 5 in the 1937 European Championship
Next race →
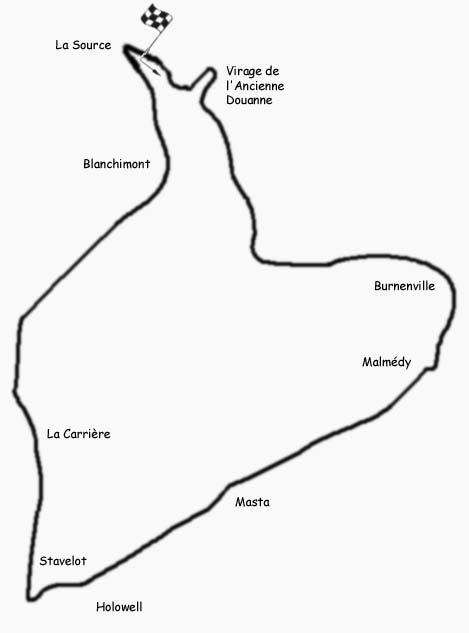

Race details
- Date: 11 July 1937
- Official name: VII Grand Prix de Belgique
- Location: Spa-Francorchamps; Spa, Belgium
- Course: Road course
- Course length: 14.95 km (9.29 miles)
- Distance: 34 laps, 508.30 km (315.86 miles)

Pole position
Driver	(France) Raymond Sommer	Alfa Romeo
- Grid positions set by ballot

Fastest lap
Driver	(Germany) Hermann Lang	Mercedes-Benz
- Time: 5:04.7

Podium
First	(Germany) Rudolf Hasse	Auto Union
Second	(Germany) Hans Stuck	Auto Union
Third	(Germany) Hermann Lang	Mercedes-Benz

The 1937 Belgian Grand Prix was a Grand Prix motor race held at Spa-Francorchamps on 11 July 1937.

== Circuit ==
It was the last Grand Prix to be held at the circuit's original configuration with the slow corner at the former Belgian-German border. This was bypassed by the fast Raidillon uphill shortcut after the bridge over Eau Rouge river.

== Vanderbilt Cup ==
A week prior, the 1937 Vanderbilt Cup race was held in the USA, and the German teams split their efforts, while Alfa Romeo's Scuderia Ferrari preferred to race in the US with its main drivers, sending only a B-team to Spa; the Belgians were particularly disappointed that Rudolf Caracciola, who was supposed to come to Belgium, pulled rank, and decided to go to the Cup, which opened up a berth for Hermann Lang. Some German pilots were supposed to take the LZ 129 Hindenburg to return in time to Europe, but this Zeppelin was destroyed to months earlier and the German airship flights were cancelled.

== Classification ==
Pos	No	Driver	Team	Car	Laps	Time/Retired	Grid	Points
1	12	(Germany) Rudolf Hasse	Auto Union	Auto Union C	34	3:01:22	5	1
2	8	(Germany) Hans Stuck	Auto Union	Auto Union C	34	+0:42	3	2
3	2	(Germany) Hermann Lang	Daimler-Benz AG	Mercedes-Benz W125	34	+2:45	4	3
4	6	(Switzerland) Christian Kautz	Daimler-Benz AG	Mercedes-Benz W125	34	+3:03	7	4
5	16	(France) Raymond Sommer	Scuderia Ferrari	Alfa Romeo 12C-36	33	+1 Lap	1	4
Ret	4	(Germany) Manfred von Brauchitsch	Daimler-Benz AG	Mercedes-Benz W125	31	Supercharger	2	4
Ret	14	(Germany) Hermann Paul Müller	Auto Union	Auto Union C	13	Oil pipe	8	6
Ret	18	(Italy) Carlo Felice Trossi	Scuderia Ferrari	Alfa Romeo 12C-36	5	Engine	6	7
DNS	10	(Italy) Luigi Fagioli	Auto Union	Auto Union C				8
DNS	20	(Belgium) Franz Gouvion	F. Gouvion	Maserati 8CM		Engine		8

Grand Prix Race
Previous race: 1936 Italian Grand Prix	1937 Grand Prix season Grandes Épreuves	Next race: 1937 German Grand Prix
Previous race: 1935 Belgian Grand Prix	Belgian Grand Prix	Next race: 1939 Belgian Grand Prix
