= Antonio Brivio =

Italian racing driver (1905–1995)

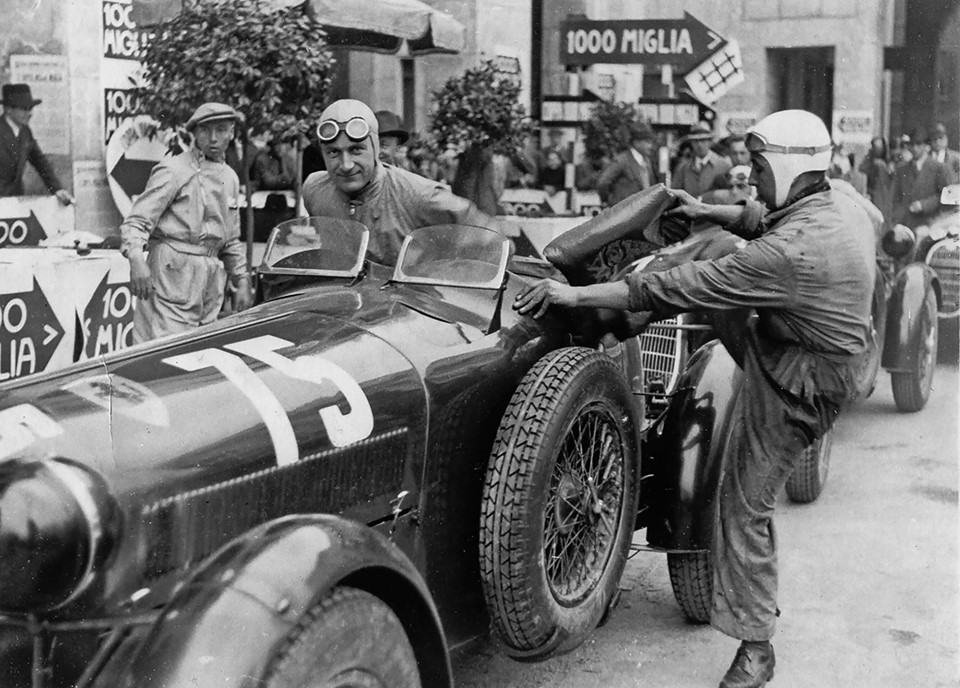
- Brivio and co-driver Ongaro at 1936 Mille Miglia

Personal information
- Born: Antonio Brivio Sforza; 27 December 1905 Biella, Piedmont, Italy
- Died: 20 January 1995 (aged 89) Milan, Lombardy, Italy

Champ Car career
- 1 race run over 1 year
- Best finish: 9th (1936)
- First race: 1936 Vanderbilt Cup (Westbury)
Wins	Podiums	Poles
0	1	1
Medal record
Bobsleigh
World Championships
Bronze medal – third place	1935 Igls	Two-man

Antonio Brivio Sforza (occasionally seen as Marchese Sforza Brivio; 27 December 1905 – 20 January 1995) was an Italian racing driver and bobsledder.

== Auto racing career ==
Among Brivio's greatest successes in the field of sports cars include a victory in the 24-hour race at Spa-Francorchamps (1932), two victories in the Targa Florio (1933 and 1935) and a win at the Mille Miglia (1936). His greatest successes in Grand Prix races were third places in the Monaco Grand Prix in 1935 and German Grand Prix in 1936. That year he won the pole position for the AAA-sanctioned Vanderbilt Cup, finishing third. He stopped racing after winning Mille Miglia in his own category in 1952.

After the Second World War, Brivio was a motorsport functionary; he became a member of the Italian Automobile Club and the Federation Internationale de l'Automobile (FIA), where he participated in the launch of the Formula One World Championship.

== Bobsleigh career ==
As a bobsledder, Brivio won a bronze medal in the two-man event at the 1935 FIBT World Championships in Igls.

At the 1936 Winter Olympics in Garmisch-Partenkirchen, he finished tenth in the four-man event and 12th in the two-man event.

== Motorsport career results ==
=== European Championship results ===
(key) (Races in bold indicate pole position) (Races in italics indicate fastest lap)

Year	Entrant	Chassis	Engine	1	2	3	4	5	6	7	EDC	Pts
1935	Scuderia Ferrari	Alfa Romeo Tipo B/P3	Alfa Romeo 2.9 L8	MON; 3	FRA	BEL					19th	50
1935	Scuderia Ferrari	Alfa Romeo Tipo B/P3	Alfa Romeo 3.2 L8				GER; Ret	SUI	ITA	ESP	19th	50
1936	Scuderia Ferrari	Alfa Romeo 8C-35	Alfa Romeo 3.8 L8	MON; 5							7th	23
1936	Scuderia Ferrari	Alfa Romeo 12C 1936	Alfa Romeo 4.1 V12		GER; 3	SUI	ITA				7th	23
1937	Scuderia Ferrari	Alfa Romeo 12C-36	Alfa Romeo 4.1 V12	BEL	GER	MON; Ret	SUI	ITA			33rd	39
