= Pietro Ghersi =

Italian motorcycle racer

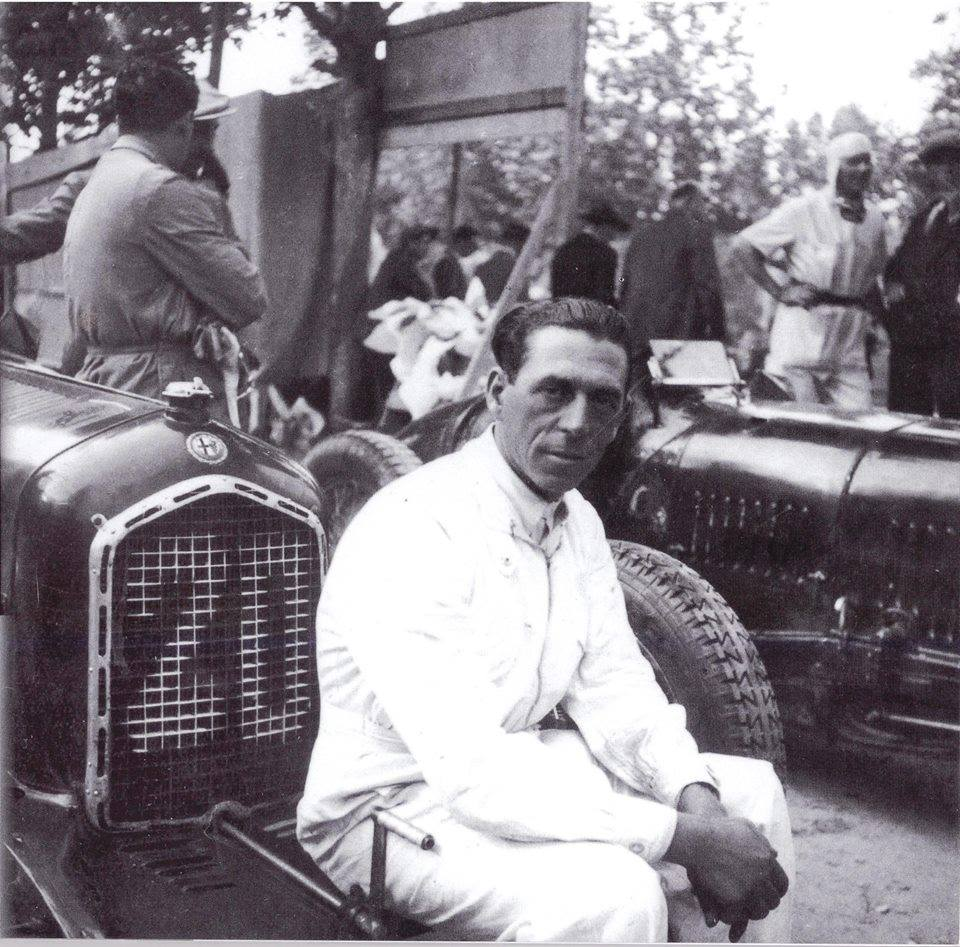
Ghersi in 1934

Pietro Ghersi (24 January 1899 – 1 August 1972) was an Italian motorcycle racer and, from 1927, also a racecar driver. He was born in Genoa.

With his brother Mario Ghersi and Luigi Arcangeli he biked in the 1926 Isle of Man TT and 1930 Isle of Man TT in Moto Guzzi.

Racing cars, Ghersi won the Spa 24 Hours 1930 with Attilio Marinoni in an Alfa Romeo 6C. In 1932, Ghersi was in the Mille Miglia and XXII Targa Florio in an Alfa Romeo 8C 2300. In 1933, with himself as the only driver, he formed the Pietro Ghersi Racing Team based in Genova, using a 2.3-liter Bugatti Type 35, a 1.1-liter Maserati monoposto, and a 2.3-liter Alfa Romeo. He raced for Scuderia Ferrari 1934 and privately in a Maserati 8CM 1935–36. He continued until the 1938 season.

== Racing record ==
=== Complete European Championship results ===
(key) (Races in bold indicate pole position) (Races in italics indicate fastest lap)

| Year | Entrant | Chassis | Engine | 1 | 2 | 3 | 4 | 5 | 6 | 7 | EDC | Pts |
|---|---|---|---|---|---|---|---|---|---|---|---|---|
| 1931 | U. Klinger | Maserati 26M | Maserati 2.5 L8 | ITA; 8 | | | | | | | —^{1} | |
| 1931 | Officine A. Maserati | Maserati 26M | Maserati 2.5 L8 | | FRA; 8 | BEL | | | | | —^{1} | |
| 1932 | Scuderia Ferrari | Alfa Romeo Monza | Alfa Romeo 2.3 L8 | ITA; 7 | FRA | GER | | | | | 9th | 20 |
| 1935 | Scuderia Subalpina | Maserati 8CM | Maserati 3.0 L8 | MON | FRA | BEL | GER; 12 | SUI | | | 21st | 51 |
| 1935 | Scuderia Subalpina | Maserati 6C-34 | Maserati 3.7 L6 | | | | | | ITA; Ret | ESP | 21st | 51 |
| 1936 | Scuderia Torino | Maserati 6C-34 | Maserati 4.7 V8 | MON; 8 | GER | SUI | | | | | 17th | 27 |
| 1936 | Scuderia Maremmana | Maserati 6C-34 | Maserati 3.7 L6 | | | | ITA; Ret | | | | 17th | 27 |
| 1938 | Scuderia Torino | Alfa Romeo 8C 2900A | Alfa Romeo 2.9 L8 | FRA | GER; 8 | SUI | | | | | 9th | 24 |
| 1938 | Scuderia Torino | Alfa Romeo Tipo 308 | Alfa Romeo 3.0 L8 | | | | ITA; 5 | | | | 9th | 24 |

Notes

- **^1** – Ghersi was co-driver with Klinger at the Italian GP and with Dreyfus at the French GP, therefore rules excluded him from the championship.
