= Attilio Marinoni =

Italian racing driver (1892–1940)

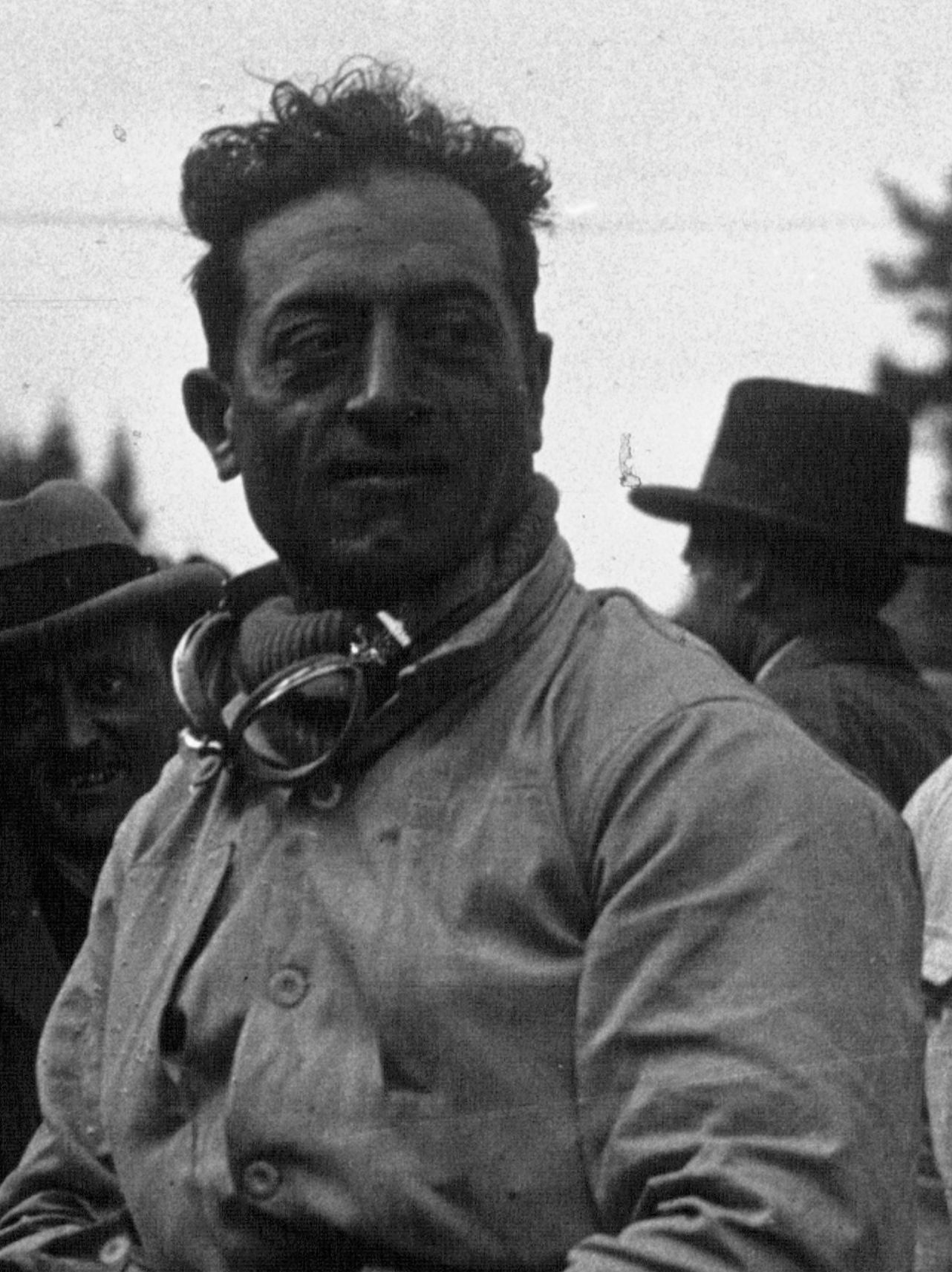
- Marinoni at the 1929 24 Hours of Spa
- Born: Attilio Marinoni; 14 January 1892 Lodi, Lombardy, Italy
- Died: 18 June 1940 (aged 48) Lainate, Lombardy, Italy

24 Hours of Le Mans career
- Years: 1931–1932
- Teams: Alfa Romeo, Djordjadze
- Best finish: DNF (1931, 1932)
- Class wins: 0

Attilio Marinoni (14 January 1892 – 18 June 1940) was an Italian racing driver.

== Biography ==
After World War I, Marinoni joined the Alfa Romeo racing team as a mechanic. He served as co-driver with Giuseppe Campari in the 1924 French Grand Prix. In an Alfa Romeo 6C, Marinoni won the 1927 Coppa Ciano, as well as three Spa 24 Hours in a row: in 1928 with Boris Ivanowski, in 1929 with Robert Benoist, and in 1930 with Pietro Ghersi. Marinoni was the chief mechanic and test driver of Scuderia Ferrari between 1934 and 1937. He traveled with the team to New York City for the 1936 Vanderbilt Cup. He died when he crashed an Alfa Romeo 158/159 Alfetta in a truck while testing for the expected 1943 season.

== Motorsports career results ==
=== European Championship results ===
(key) (Races in bold indicate pole position) (Races in italics indicate fastest lap)

Year	Entrant	Chassis	Engine	1	2	3	4	5	6	7	EDC	Pts
1931	SA Alfa Romeo	Alfa Romeo 8C-2300	Alfa Romeo 2.3 L8	ITA; DNS	FRA	BEL					—^{1}	
1932	SA Alfa Romeo	Alfa Romeo Monza	Alfa Romeo 2.3 L8	ITA; 3^{2}	FRA	GER					—^{2}	
1935	Scuderia Ferrari	Alfa Romeo Tipo B/P3	Alfa Romeo 3.2 L8	MON	FRA	BEL; 4^{2}	GER	SUI	ITA; 4	ESP	24th	52
1937	Scuderia Ferrari	Alfa Romeo 12C-36	Alfa Romeo 4.1 V12	BEL	GER; 11	MON	SUI	ITA			20th	36

Notes

- **^1** – Not listed in the Championship as Marinoni did not start a Grand Prix in 1931
- **^2** – As a co-driver Marinoni was ineligible for championship points

=== 24 Hours of Le Mans results ===
Year	Team	Co-Drivers	Car	Class	Laps	Pos.	Class Pos.
1931	(Italy) Automobili Alfa Romeo	(Italy) Goffredo Zehender	Alfa Romeo 8C 2300 LM	3.0	99	DNF	DNF
1932	(Russia) Prince Djordjadze	(Italy) Angelo Guatta	Alfa Romeo 8C 2300 LM	3.0	14	DNF	DNF
