= Achille Varzi =

Italian racing driver (1904–1948)

- Nationality: (Italy) Italian
- Born: 8 August 1904 Galliate, Piedmont, Italy
- Died: 1 July 1948 (aged 43) Bremgarten bei Bern, Bern, Switzerland

Championship titles
- Major victories Monaco Grand Prix (1933)

24 Hours of Le Mans career
- Years: 1931
- Teams: Bugatti
- Best finish: DNF (1931)
- Class wins: 0

Achille Varzi (8 August 1904 – 1 July 1948) was an Italian racing driver. He is remembered as the winner of the 1933 Monaco Grand Prix, as well as the winner of the first Formula One Grand Prix at the 1946 Turin Grand Prix, and as the chief rival of Tazio Nuvolari.

== Career ==
Born in Galliate, province of Novara (Piedmont), Achille Varzi was the son of a textile manufacturer. As a young man, he was a successful motorcycle racer of Garelli, DOT, Moto Guzzi and Sunbeam, and rode seven times in the Isle of Man TT from 1924 before switching to auto racing in 1928 where, for the next ten years, he would rival Tazio Nuvolari, Rudolf Caracciola and Bernd Rosemeyer.

Varzi's first race car was a Type 35 Bugatti but he shortly changed to driving an Alfa Romeo, a brand with which he would score many victories during the 1929 Italian racing season. In 1930 Varzi acquired a vehicle from the relatively new Maserati company. He drove it as well as an Alfa Romeo earning his country's racing championship, a feat he would repeat in 1934. One of his big victories came at the prestigious Targa Florio, where he upset the favored Louis Chiron. Following his win at the 1933 Tripoli Grand Prix, a race at the time associated with a lottery, Varzi was at the forefront of allegations that the race had been fixed.

Varzi won six Grand Prix in 1934 driving the Alfa Romeo P3, at Alessandria, Tripoli, Targa Florio, Penya Rhin at Barcelona, Coppa Ciano and Nice. He also became the first driver in history to hold both the Targa Florio and Mille Miglia title in one season

Although the Alfa Romeo team had proved to be competitive under the management of Enzo Ferrari, Varzi decided to join the Auto Union team, racing for them between 1935 and 1937. This move coincided with Varzi having serious personal problems, including an addiction to morphine and a difficult affair with Ilse Pietsch (Engel/Hubitsch/Feininger), the wife of fellow driver Paul Pietsch. Quickly overshadowed by teammate Bernd Rosemeyer, his trips to the winners circle dropped to only four, but he did win his third Tripoli Grand Prix in his third different vehicle. By 1938, he had dropped out of sight and the advent of World War II ended racing in Europe. During the war, Varzi overcame his drug addiction and settled down with his new wife, Norma Colombo. At the end of the War, Varzi made a remarkable comeback at the age of 42. In 1946, he attempted to race a Maserati for the Indianapolis 500 but failed to qualify. In 1947, he won three minor Grand Prix races and traveled to Argentina to race in the Buenos Aires Grand Prix.

== Death ==
During practice runs for the 1948 Swiss Grand Prix, a light rain fell on the Bremgarten track in Berne, Switzerland. Varzi's Alfa Romeo 158 skidded on the wet surface, flipping over and crushing him to death. He was buried in his hometown.

== Legacy ==
Varzi's death resulted in the FIA mandating the wearing of crash helmets for racing, which had been optional previously. In 1950, Varzi's chief mechanic, Amedeo Bignami, co-established the Scuderia Achille Varzi in Argentina. The team entered some Formula One races in 1950 equipped with Maseratis 4CL and 4CLT and featured drivers José Froilán González, Antonio Branca, Alfredo Pián and Nello Pagani.

On 5 June 2004, Poste Italiane issued a stamp commemorating Varzi.

== In popular culture ==
Varzi was mentioned more than once in the 2023 movie, Ferrari (2023 film). In the film, at least twice, Enzo Ferrari said that the newest addition to his racing team, Alfonso de Portago, "drives like Varzi."

== Motorsports career results ==
=== Notable victories ===
In 1991, motorsport journalist Giorgio Terruzzi recounted Varzi's story in a book titled Una curva cieca – Vita di Achille Varzi. During his career, Achille Varzi competed in 139 races, winning 33. Some of his major victories include:

- Avusrennen: 1933
- Coppa Acerbo: 1930, 1935
- Coppa Ciano: 1929, 1934
- French Grand Prix: 1931
- Monza Grand Prix: 1929, 1930
- Nice Grand Prix: 1934
- Gran Premio del Valentino: 1946
- Mille Miglia: 1934
- Monaco Grand Prix: 1933
- Penya Rhin Grand Prix: 1934
- Targa Florio: 1930, 1934
- San Remo Grand Prix: 1937
- Spanish Grand Prix: 1930
- Tripoli Grand Prix: 1933, 1934, 1936
- Tunis Grand Prix: 1931, 1932
- Turin Grand Prix: 1946

=== European Championship results ===
(key) (Races in bold indicate pole position)

Year	Entrant	Make	1	2	3	4	5	6	7	EDC	Points
1931	Usines Bugatti	Bugatti	ITA; Ret	FRA; 1	BEL; Ret					4=	12
1932	Ettore Bugatti	Bugatti	ITA; Ret	FRA; Ret	GER					16=	21
1935	Auto Union	Auto Union	MON	FRA; 5	BEL	GER; 8	**SUI**; 4	ITA; Ret	ESP; Ret	7=	39
1936	Auto Union	Auto Union	MON; 2	GER	SUI; 2	ITA; Ret				4	19
1937	Auto Union	Auto Union	BEL	GER	MON	SUI	ITA; 6			20=	36

=== Other Grandes Épreuves ===
(key) (Races in bold indicate pole position)

1933	Ettore Bugatti	Bugatti	MON; 1	FRA	BEL; 2	ITA; Ret	ESP; 4	
1934	Scuderia Ferrari	Alfa Romeo	MON; 6	FRA; 2	BEL; Ret	BEL; Ret	ITA; Ret	ESP; 5

=== Post-WWII Grandes Épreuves results ===
(key)

Year	Entrant	Chassis	1	2	3	4	5
1947	Alfa Corse	Alfa Romeo 158	SUI; 2	BEL; 2	ITA; 2	FRA	
1948	Alfa Corse	Alfa Romeo 158	MON	SUI; DNS †	FRA	ITA	GBR
