= Goffredo Zehender =

Italian racing driver (1901–1958)

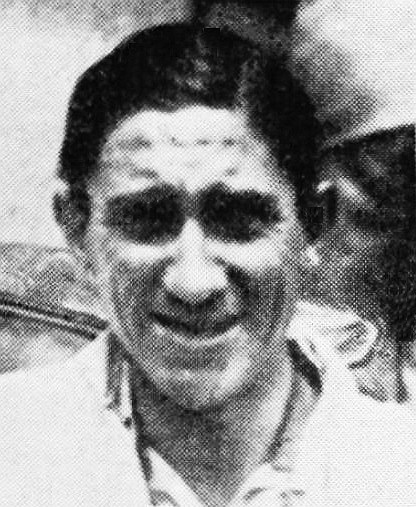
Geoffredo Zehender in 1929, au circuit de Lazarte.

Goffredo 'Freddie' Zehender (Reggio Calabria, Italy, 27 February 1901 - 7 January 1958) was an Italian racing driver. He started his driving career with Chrysler, then Bugatti and most of his career with Alfa Romeo as works or private driver. He won the 1932 Grand Prix du Comminges with private Alfa Romeo 8C 2300 'Monza'. From 1934 he raced also for Maserati.

== Racing record ==
=== Complete 24 Hours of Le Mans results ===
Year	Team	Co-Drivers	Car	Class	Laps	Pos.	Class Pos.
1928	No Team Name	(France) Jérôme Ledure	Chrysler 72	5.0	5	DNF	DNF
1931	(Italy) Soc. Anon. Alfa Romeo	(Italy) Attilio Marinoni	Alfa Romeo 8C 2300	3.0	99	DNF	DNF
1956	(France) Automobiles Talbot	(France) Jean Lucas	Talbot-Lago Sport 2500-Maserati	S 3.0	32	DNF	DNF

=== Complete European Championship results ===
(key) (Races in bold indicate pole position) (Races in italics indicate fastest lap)

Year	Entrant	Chassis	Engine	1	2	3	4	5	6	7	EDC	Pts
1931	SA Alfa Romeo	Alfa Romeo 8C-2300	Alfa Romeo 2.3 L8	ITA; DNS		BEL; Ret					—^{1}	
1931	SA Alfa Romeo	Alfa Romeo Monza	Alfa Romeo 2.3 L8		FRA; 6						—^{1}	
1932	G. Zehender	Alfa Romeo Monza	Alfa Romeo 2.3 L8	ITA	FRA; 7	GER					9th	20
1935	Scuderia Subalpina	Maserati 8CM	Maserati 3.2 L8	MON; 7							11th	42
1935	Scuderia Subalpina	Maserati 6C-34	Maserati 3.7 L6		FRA; 3	BEL			ITA; Ret	ESP	11th	42
1935	Scuderia Subalpina	Maserati 6C-34	Maserati 3.3 L6				GER; 11	SUI			11th	42
1937	Daimler Benz AG	Mercedes W125	Mercedes M125 5.7 L8	BEL	GER	MON; 5	SUI	ITA			20th	36
1938	Officine A. Maserati	Maserati 8CTF	Maserati 3.0 L8	FRA	GER	SUI	ITA; Ret				26th	30

Notes

- **^1** – Zehender was co-driver with Minoia at the French GP and with Campari at the Belgian GP, therefore rules excluded him from the championship.
