= 1935 Grand Prix season =

Third AIACR European Championship season

1935 AIACR European Championship season

Seasons
- ← 1932 1936 →

1935 Grand Prix season

Seasons
- ← 1934 1936 →

The 1935 Grand Prix season was the second year of the new 750 kg Formula. The success of the previous year encouraged the AIACR to reinitiate the European Championship. It was composed of the seven national Grands Prix and was won by Rudolf Caracciola, driving for the Mercedes-Benz team. The team dominated the season winning five of those Grand Épreuves, as well as four of the other major races of the season. However, in one of the great motor-races in sporting history, Tazio Nuvolari in a Scuderia Ferrari Alfa Romeo beat the combined numbers of the German teams in their home Grand Prix. The season also saw the arrival on the international stage of the bright young talent Bernd Rosemeyer in the Auto Union team.

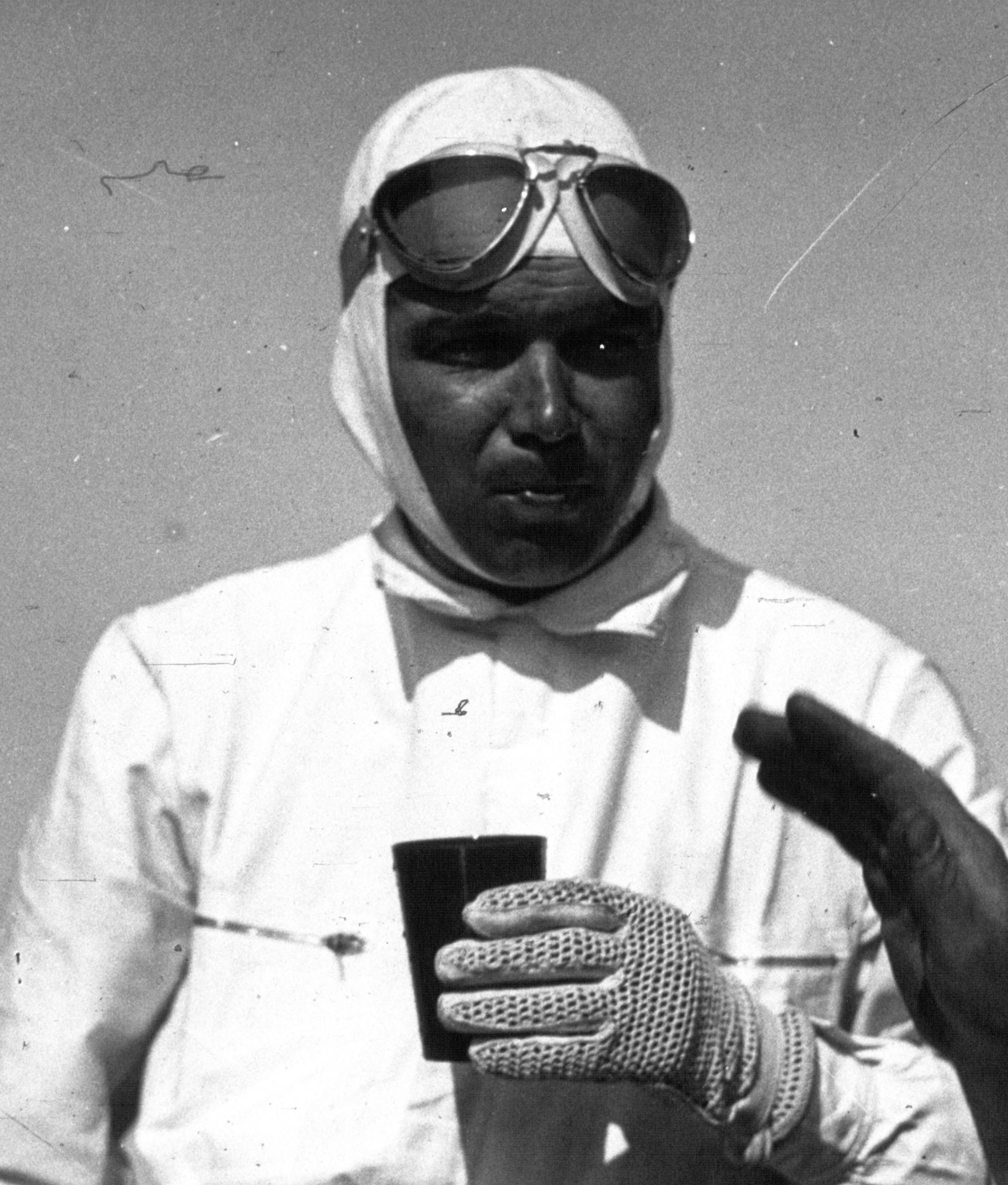
Rudolf Caracciola, 1935 European Champion, after his victory at the French GP

Note that the Nazi German flag, bearing the swastika, was adopted on 15 September 1935 – one week before the final championship race of the season.

== European Championship Grands Prix ==
	Date	Name	Circuit	Race Regulations	Weather	Race Distance	Winner's Time	Winning driver	Winning constructor	Fastest lap	Report
1	22 Apr	VII Grand Prix de Monaco	Monte Carlo	AIACR	overcast	320 km	3h 24m	(Italy) Luigi Fagioli	Mercedes-Benz W25	Luigi Fagioli; Mercedes-Benz	Report
2	23 Jun	(France) XXIX Grand Prix de l’ACF	Montlhéry	AIACR	hot	500 km	4h 01m	(Germany) Rudolf Caracciola	Mercedes-Benz W25B	Tazio Nuvolari; Alfa Romeo	Report
3	14 Jul	(Belgium) VI Grand Prix de Belgique	Spa-Francorchamps	AIACR	hot	505 km	3h 13m	(Germany) Rudolf Caracciola	Mercedes-Benz W25B	Manfred von Brauchitsch; Mercedes-Benz	Report
4	28 Jul	(Germany) VIII Grosser Preis von Deutschland	Nürburgring	AIACR	rain	500 km	4h 09m	(Italy) Tazio Nuvolari	Alfa Romeo Tipo B	Manfred von Brauchitsch; Mercedes-Benz	Report
5	25 Aug	(Switzerland) II Grosser Preis der Schweiz	Bremgarten	AIACR	rain	510 km	3h 31m	(Germany) Rudolf Caracciola	Mercedes-Benz W25B	Rudolf Caracciola; Mercedes-Benz	Report
6	8 Sep	(Italy) XIII Gran Premio d’Italia	Monza	AIACR	hot, windy	500 km	3h 40m	(Germany) Hans Stuck	Auto Union Type B	Tazio Nuvolari; Alfa Romeo	Report
7	22 Sep	(Spain) X Gran Premio de España	Lasarte	AIACR	hot	520 km	3h 10m	(Germany) Rudolf Caracciola	Mercedes-Benz W25A	Achille Varzi; Auto Union	Report

== Major Non-championship Races ==
Multiple classes are mentioned when they were divided and run to different race lengths.

	Date	Name	Circuit	Race Regulations	Weather	Race Distance	Winner's Time	Winning driver	Winning constructor	Report
	10 Feb	(Norway) II Norges Grand Prix	Bogstadvannet, Oslo	Formula Libre	snowstorm	100 km	51m	(Sweden) Per-Viktor Widengren	Alfa Romeo 8C 2600 Monza	Report
	17 Feb	(Sweden) II Vallentunaloppet	Vallentunasjön	Formula Libre	snowstorm	40 km	22m	(Sweden) Per-Viktor Widengren	Alfa Romeo 8C 2600 Monza	Report
	24 Feb	(France) III Grand Prix de Pau	Pau	Formula Libre	sunny	220 km	2h 38m	(Italy) Tazio Nuvolari	Alfa Romeo Tipo B	Report
	1 Apr	(Australia) VIII Australian Grand Prix	Phillip Island	Up to 2-litre handicap	sunny, dusty	200 miles	3h 03m	(Australia) Les Murphy	MG P-type	Report
	28 Apr	(Italy) XXVI Targa Florio	Piccolo Madonie	Formula Libre; Voiturette	sunny	430 km	5h 27m	(Italy) Antonio Brivio	Alfa Romeo Tipo B	Report
A	5 May	(French protectorate of Tunisia) VI Grand Prix de Tunisie	Carthage	Formula Libre	sunny, windy	500 km	3h 06m	(Italy) Achille Varzi	Auto Union Type A	Report
B	12 May	(Libya) IX Gran Premio di Tripoli (III Lotteria di Tripoli)	Mellaha	Formula Libre	warm	525 km	2h 39m	(Germany) Rudolf Caracciola	Mercedes-Benz W25	Report
	12 May	(Finland) IV Eläintarhanajot (Djurgårdsloppet)	Eläintarharata	Formula Libre	sunny, cold	100 km	60m	(Finland) Karl Ebb	Mercedes-Benz SSK	Report
	19 May	(Italy) I Circuito di Bergamo (Coppa Citta di Bergamo)	Bergamo	Formula Libre	sunny	200 km	2h 23m	(Italy) Tazio Nuvolari	Alfa Romeo Tipo B	Report
C	26 May	(Germany) V Internationales Avusrennen	AVUS	Formula Libre heats	overcast	200 km	49m	(Italy) Luigi Fagioli	Mercedes-Benz W25	Report
	26 May	(France) XI Grand Prix de Picardie	Péronne	Formula Libre	overcast	390 km	3h 00m	(France) Robert Benoist	Bugatti Type 59	Report
	26 May	(France) III Circuit d'Orléans	Orléans	Formula Libre	rain	110 km* race stopped at 25 km	17m*	(France) Robert Cazaux	Bugatti Type 51	Report
	29 May	(United Kingdom) III Mannin Beg	Douglas	Voiturette		200 miles	3h 00m	(United Kingdom) Pat Fairfield	ERA Type A	Report
	30 May	(United States) XXIII International 500 Mile; Sweepstakes	Indianapolis	AAA	overcast	500 miles	4h 42m	(United States) Kelly Petillo	Wetteroth-Offenhauser	Report
	31 May	(United Kingdom) III Mannin Moar	Douglas	Formula Libre	overcast	200 miles	2h 40m	(United Kingdom) Brian Lewis, Baron Essendon	Bugatti Type 59	Report
	2 Jun	(France) II Grand Prix de l’UMF	Montlhéry	Formula Libre	wet	90 km	36mins	(France) Raymond Sommer	Alfa Romeo Tipo B	Report
	2 Jun	(Brazil) III Grande Prêmio da Cidade de Rio de Janeiro	Gávea	Formula Libre	sunny	280 km	4h 03m	(Argentina) Riccardo Carú	Fiat 1.5-litre	Report
	9 Jun	(Belgium) X Grand Prix des Frontières	Chimay	Formula Libre	sunny	220 km	1h 44m	(Germany) Rudolf Steinweg	Bugatti Type 51A	Report
	9 Jun	(Italy) II Circuito di Biella	Biella	Formula Libre, heats Voiturette	hot	110 km	1h 15m	(Italy) Tazio Nuvolari	Alfa Romeo Tipo B	Report
D	16 Jun	(Germany) IX Eifelrennen	Nürburgring	AIACR; Voiturette	rain	250 km	2h 08m	(Germany) Rudolf Caracciola	Mercedes-Benz W25B	Report
	23 Jun	(Brazil) Circuito do Chapadão	Campinas	Formula Libre		200 km		(Brazil) Chico Landi	Fiat 1500	Report
E	30 Jun	(Spain) VI Gran Premio de Penya Rhin	Montjuïc Park	AIACR	hot	270 km	2h 28m	(Italy) Luigi Fagioli	Mercedes-Benz W25B	Report
	30 Jun	(France) IV Grand Prix de Lorraine (Les Trois Heures de Nancy)	Seichamps, Nancy	Formula Libre; Voiturette	?	326 km (winner)	3 hours	(Monaco) Louis Chiron	Alfa Romeo Tipo B	Report
	7 Jul	(France) X Grand Prix de la Marne	Reims-Gueux	Formula Libre, heats	windy	326 km (winner)	1 hour (final)	(France) René Dreyfus	Alfa Romeo Tipo B	Report
	7 Jul	(Italy) I Gran Premio del Valentino	Parco del Valentino, Turin	Formula Libre, heats	sunny	125 km (reduced)	1h 04m	(Italy) Tazio Nuvolari	Alfa Romeo Tipo B	Report
	14 Jul	(France) III Grand Prix de l'Albigeois	Les Planques, Albi	Voiturette, heats	rain	360 km	2h 35m	(France) Pierre Veyron	Bugatti Type 51A	Report
	21 Jul	(France) VII Grand Prix de Dieppe	Dieppe<	Formula Libre; Voiturette	sunny	400 km (winner)	3 hours	(France) René Dreyfus	Alfa Romeo Tipo B	Report
	4 Aug	(Italy) IX Coppa Ciano	Montenero	Formula Libre; Voiturette	hot	240 km	2h 42m	(Italy) Tazio Nuvolari	Alfa Romeo Tipo B	Report
	4 Aug	(France) XI Grand Prix du Comminges	Saint-Gaudens	Formula Libre, heats	cloudy	165 km	1h 04m	(France) Raymond Sommer	Alfa Romeo Tipo B	Report
F	15 Aug	(Italy) XI Coppa Acerbo	Pescara	AIACR; Voiturette	overcast	520 km	3h 44m	(Italy) Achille Varzi	Auto Union B	Report
	18 Aug	(France) IV Grand Prix de Nice	Nice	AIACR	cloudy	320 km	3h 05m	(Italy) Tazio Nuvolari	Alfa Romeo Tipo B	Report
	25 Aug	(France) II Prix de Berne	Bremgarten	Voiturette	wet	150 km	1h 05m	(United Kingdom) Richard Seaman	ERA B	Report
	1 Sep	(France) Grand Prix de Vichy						cancelled		
	15 Sep	(Italy) IV Circuito di Modena	Modena	Formula Libre; Voiturette	sunny	190 km	1h 48m	(Italy) Tazio Nuvolari	Alfa Romeo 8C-35	Report
	15 Sep	(Estonia) III Eesti Suursõit	Pirita-Kose, Tallinn	Formula Libre; Voiturette	cloudy	70 km	42 mins	(Finland) Karl Ebb	Mercedes-Benz SSK	Report
G	29 Sep	(Czechoslovakia) VI Velká Cena Masarykova	Masaryk-Ring, Brno	Formula Libre; Voiturette	sunny	500 km	3h 44m	(Germany) Bernd Rosemeyer	Auto Union Type B	Report
	29 Sep	(Italy) Coppa Edda Ciano; I Circuito di Lucca	Lucca	Formula Libre, heats	sunny	120 km	1h 15m	(Italy) Mario Tadini	Alfa Romeo Tipo B	Report
	29 Sep	(Argentina) 200 Milles du Tucumán	Parque Neuve de Julio, Tucumán Province	Formula Libre		200 miles* shortened to 155 miles	3h 06m	(Austria) / (Argentina) Karel "Carlos" Zatuszek	Mercedes-Benz SSK	Report
	5 Oct	(United Kingdom) I Donington Grand Prix	Donington Park	Formula Libre	rain	490 km	4h 47m	(United Kingdom) Dick Shuttleworth	Alfa Romeo Tipo B	Report
	6 Oct	(Italy) IX Coppa della Sila; IV Coppa Michele Bianchi	Cosenza	Formula Libre, heats		125 km	1h 27m	(Italy) Antonio Brivio	Alfa Romeo Tipo B	Report
	20 Oct	(Portugal) II Circuito do Estoril	Estoril	Formula Libre		185 km	2h 00m	(Portugal) Francisco Ribeiro Ferreira	Bugatti Type 51	Report
	27 Oct	(Italy) Coppa Principessa di Piemonte	Posillipo					cancelled		
	15 Nov	(Brazil) Grande Prêmio da Cidade de Porto Alegre	Porto Alegre	Formula Libre				(Brazil) Norberto Jung	Ford	Report
	29 Dec	(Argentina) Premio Emilio Saint	Parque Urquioza Parana, Entre Ríos Province	Formula Libre		100 miles	2h 18m	(Austria) / (Argentina) Karel "Carlos" Zatuszek	Mercedes-Benz SSK	Report

== Regulations ==
This was the second year of the 750 kg Formula, and also marked the return of the European Championship. Seven of the eight recognised national races were included (excepting a British GP) with the AIACR requiring a minimum race-length of 500 km. After a successful inaugural race, the AIACR elevated the Swiss Grand Prix to Grand Épreuve status.

Top-tier racing was quickly becoming the preserve of the major manufacturers and big customer teams. With limited funds and a good quantity of entries from those teams, race organisers were less likely to pay starting-money to the solo privateers. Thus, this year saw the formation in Paris of the Independent Drivers' Association, as they were gradually consigned to the lesser, local races in the Grand prix calendar. This was also a reason that 1935 saw the rise in popularity of the voiturette formula, now extended to include 1.5-litre engines. It saw close racing between tried and tested Maserati and Bugatti models versus the new British ERA.

=== Technical Innovation ===
The previous season had seen the strong debut of the two German works teams from Mercedes-Benz and Auto Union. For this year, Mercedes-Benz stayed with the W25 model, gradually boring out the engine from 3.7-litres to 4.0 then 4.3-litres. The gearbox was also uprated to be able to withstand the additional engine power. Designer Dr Hans Nibel had died of a stroke the previous November, and former racer Max Sailer had replaced him as Technical Director.

By contrast, Auto Union unveiled its Type B, with 56 individual changes, including torsion bar rear suspension and increasing the engine size to 4.9-litres (and then 5.6-litres late in the season).

The Alfa Romeo Tipo B had been the only car able to take on the German cars with any consistency. This year it was overhauled, getting an improved 3.2-litre engine, new independent rear-suspension and hydraulic brakes. Scuderia Ferrari stayed on as the works team, however the Tipo B was also now released to private sale and there were a number of buyers from Italy, France and Britain. Later in the year, the latest iteration of the 8C, the 8C-35 was given to Ferrari. A sleek new design in the style of the Mercedes, it had a 3.8-litre engine and fully independent suspension. Enzo Ferrari also unveiled the mighty Bimotore for the open-formula races on the high-speed tracks. Designed by Ferrari engineer Luigi Bazzi, it featured two 3.2-litre Tipo B engines, mounted in front of, and behind, the driver. The clutch was mounted by the front engine, with the gearbox between the engines and twin driveshafts sending power to the rear wheels. Despite its potential power (developing 540 bhp), it was very difficult to handle and ferocious on tyre wear and fuel consumption. Nuvolari, however, did set a flying kilometre speed-record later in the year on the Florence Autostrada.

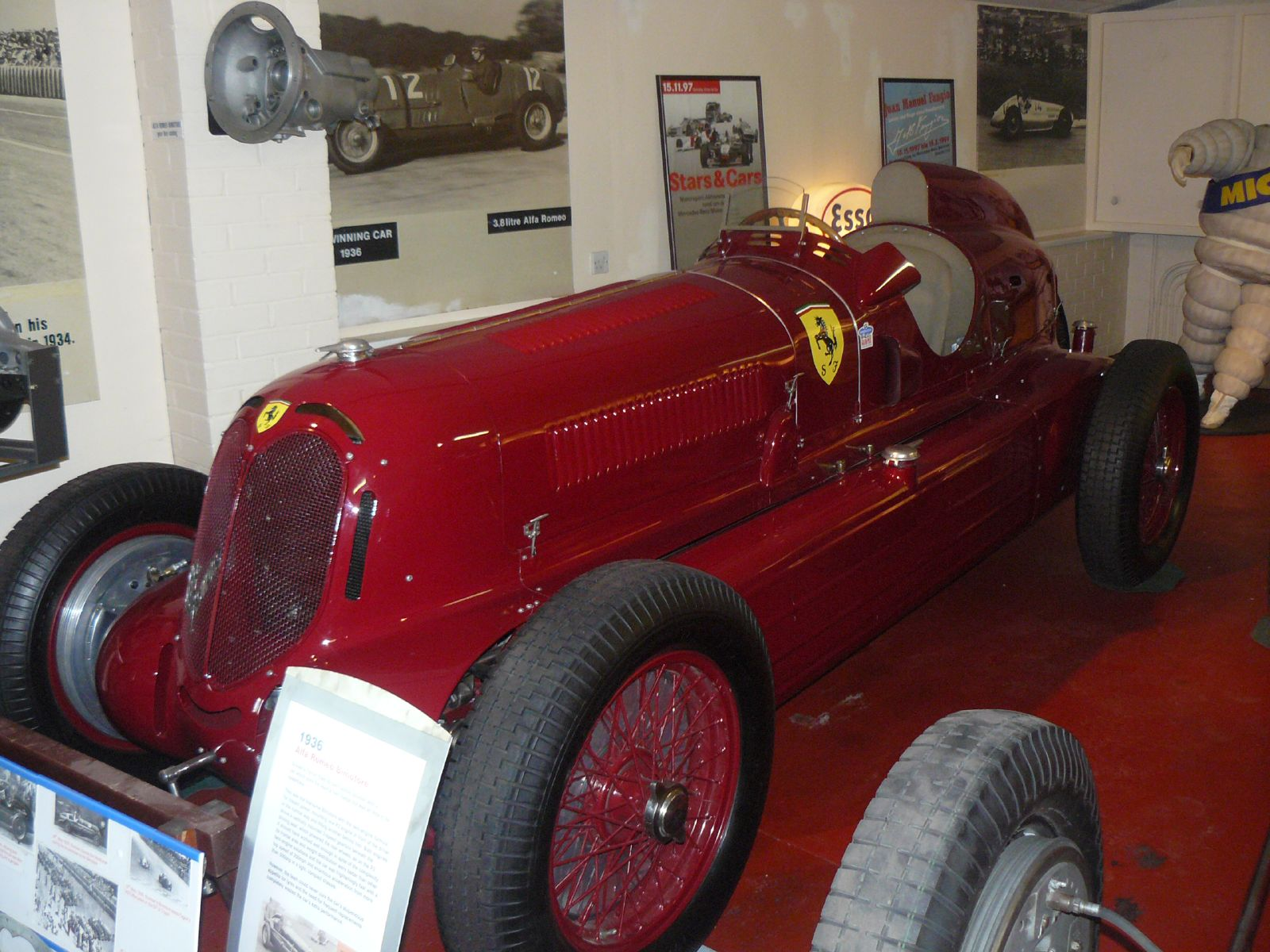
Alfa Romeo Bimotore

Near the end of the season, Alfa Romeo released its new model to Ferrari – the 8C-35. The 3.8-litre engine was put onto a new chassis with a rear-mounted gearbox and swing-axle rear suspension. It was an interim measure while Vittorio Jano worked on a new V12.

Maserati had unveiled its next model, the 6C-34, to Nuvolari near the end of the last season to limited success. They continued to campaign both that and the older 8CM. In the middle of the year, they released the new V8-RI model. It had a supercharged 4.8-litre engine, was fitted with independent suspension on all four wheels, and rear-mounted drivetrain. However, the lack of interest from the company left it undeveloped.

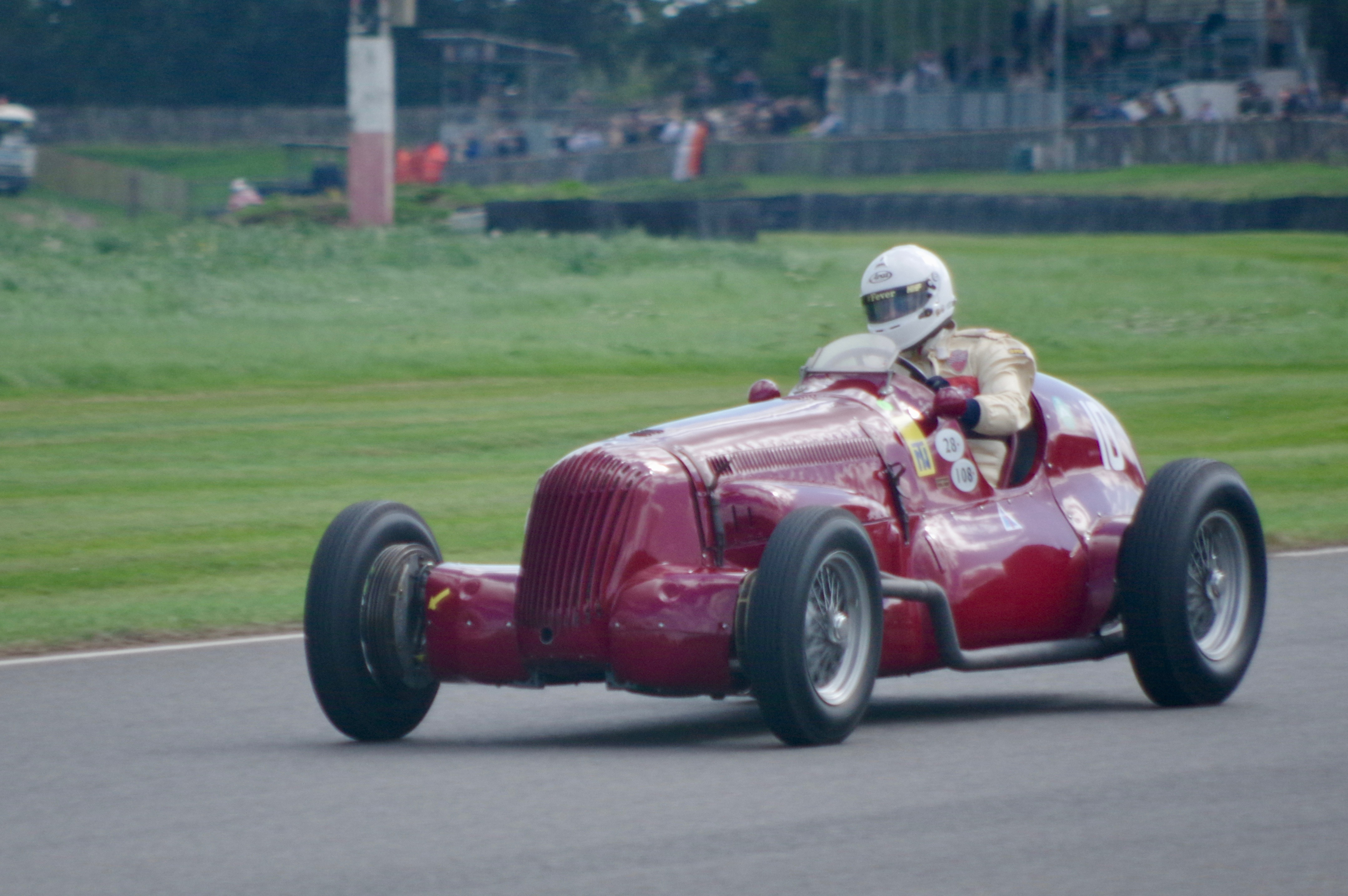
The new Maserati V8-RI

Automobiles Ettore Bugatti saw that its Type 59 was uncompetitive, even with a bigger 3.8-litre. Therefore, the team chose only to contest the Championship sporadically. Instead they, and their fleet of customer drivers, entered the second tier races where the German teams did not arrive, with much improved reliability finally. The French SEFAC project was established by the new government to take up the French response to the German teams. Aiming to be supported by public fundraising, little interest was shown. Designer Émil Petit, who had previously worked at Salmson had a novel supercharged 3-litre engine with two block of four cylinders beside each other. However, it was put into an obsolete chassis design that suffered from lack of power and unreliability.

In the voiturette class, the normal order of Bugatti versus Maserati was upstaged by the new English English Racing Automobiles (ERA). An improved B version had been developed with more chassis bracing. Success had attracted private interest with cricketer Pat Fairfield the first to buy one, for £1700, and the second was young, up-and-coming British driver Dick Seaman. Another car was bought by Prince Chula of Siam for his younger cousin, Prince Birabongse, as a 21st present. Meanwhile, wealthy British privateer, Earl Howe carried on campaigning his 1927 Delage, which was still powerful enough to be competitive.

Manufacturer	Model	Engine	Power Output	Max. Speed (km/h)	Dry Weight (kg)
(Germany) Mercedes-Benz	W25B	Mercedes-Benz 4.0L S8 supercharged	430 bhp	310	750
(Germany) Auto Union	Type B	Auto Union 5.0L V16 supercharged	375 bhp	290	745
(Italy) Alfa Romeo	Tipo B	Alfa Romeo 3.2L S8 twin-supercharged	265 bhp	275	740
(Italy) Alfa Romeo	Bimotore	Alfa Romeo 2x 3.2L S8 twin-supercharged	540 bhp	320	1030 (full)
(France) Bugatti	Type 59	Bugatti 3.8L S8 supercharged	250 bhp	250	740
(Italy) Maserati	V8-RI	Maserati 4.8L V8 supercharged	320 bhp	270	735
(Italy) Maserati	6C-34	Maserati 3.7L S6 supercharged	260 bhp	250	745
(United Kingdom) ERA	B	ERA 1488cc S6 supercharged	150 bhp	200	780

== Teams and drivers ==
After the previous season, it was seen that the German cars would be the teams to beat. Mercedes-Benz, managed by Alfred Neubauer, stayed with their experienced driver line-up of Rudolf Caracciola, Luigi Fagioli and Manfred von Brauchitsch. Reserve drivers would be test driver Hanns Geier and Faglioli's chief mechanic, Hermann Lang.

At the start of the year, Auto Union was in a bind with drivers - Prinz von Leiningen had retired after several episodes the year before of kidney problems. August Momberger had retired with worsening arthritis and personality clashes with team manager Willy Walb, while Wilhelm Sebastian recognised he was too slow with such powerful machinery. Walb therefore enticed Achille Varzi away from Ferrari to join Hans Stuck. German privateer Paul Pietsch was brought on as the reserve driver and 25-year old motorcycle racer Bernd Rosemeyer joined the team. Recognising that he could not succeed as a privateer, Nuvolari approached Auto Union for a place. He was refused, however, as neither Stuck nor Varzi wanted him as their teammate.

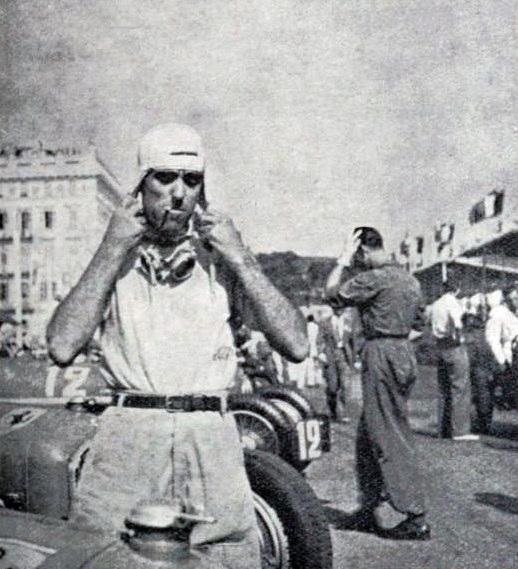
Nuvolari, at Nice, with his ‘lucky’ yellow shirt and blue trousers

The Scuderia Ferrari remained Alfa Romeo's primary team, but after the death of Guy Moll and loss of Varzi to Auto Union were in a difficult position. Louis Chiron remained but it took a personal directive from Italian leader Benito Mussolini to force Ferrari to re-hire the great Tazio Nuvolari to maintain Italy's racing prestige. Nuvolari had previously left the team acrimoniously in the middle of the 1933 season. Nuvolari thus joined Chiron, René Dreyfus and a number of Italian regulars brought in to fill the grids with Ferrari's cars. For the first time, Alfa Romeo also released the Tipo B for sale to privateers and a number were quickly snapped up, being instantly competitive in their local races.

Maserati followed Alfa Romeo's lead and took on board the Scuderia Subalpina of Conte Luigi della Chiesa as its de facto works team. Team drivers were the experienced Philippe Étancelin and Goffredo Zehender, with a number of other drivers brought in as support. They ran a mix of the 8CM (3.0 and 3.2-litre versions) and the newer 6C-34. Whitney Straight had given up racing but Maserati still had a variety of customer teams including Gino Rovere and the Gruppo Genovese San Giorgio (Italy), Écurie Braillard (Switzerland) and Scuderia Villapadierna (Spain).

Bugatti was in the worst shape of the five manufacturers, stripped of their best drivers and running an increasingly dated car based on the elderly Type 35 chassis. Long-time team manager ”Meo” Costantini had retired at the end of the last season and returned to Italy. Jean Bugatti took up the role in his stead. The works team drivers were 40-year old Robert Benoist and the young prospect Jean-Pierre Wimille. The company sold four of the eight Type 59 cars to English drivers and were supported by a squadron of privateer drivers still filling out the fields with their Type 51s and Type 35s in the non-championship races.

Anglo-American Whitney Straight had left Grand Prix racing at the start of the year after unsuccessfully trying to buy an Auto Union car for his team. There were still a number of wealthy owner-drivers running several cars at local events or their own national Grand Prix. The change of the voiturette regulations opened those races to the older 1.5-litre Bugattis and Maseratis, but it was the new British ERA cars proving the cars to beat. Aside from the works team run by Raymond Mays, there were notable privateer efforts by Englishman Richard Seaman and wealthy Siamese Prince Birabongse (racing under the pseudonym of 'B. Bira').

These tables only intend to cover entries in the major races, using the key above. It includes all starters in the European Championship races. Sources:

Entrant	Constructor	Chassis	Engine	Tyre	Driver	Rounds
(Germany) Daimler-Benz AG	Mercedes-Benz	W25 W25A; W25B	Mercedes-Benz 3.4L S8 s/c Mercedes-Benz 3.7L S8 s/c Mercedes-Benz 4.0L S8 s/c Mercedes-Benz 3.7L S8 s/c Mercedes-Benz 4.0L S8 s/c	C	(Germany) Rudolf Caracciola	1, 2, 3, 4, 5, 6, 7; B, C, D, E, [G]
(Germany) Daimler-Benz AG	Mercedes-Benz	W25 W25A; W25B	Mercedes-Benz 3.4L S8 s/c Mercedes-Benz 3.7L S8 s/c Mercedes-Benz 4.0L S8 s/c Mercedes-Benz 3.7L S8 s/c Mercedes-Benz 4.0L S8 s/c	C	(Italy) Luigi Fagioli	1, 2, 3, 4, 5, 6, 7; B, C, D, E, [G]
(Germany) Daimler-Benz AG	Mercedes-Benz	W25 W25A; W25B	Mercedes-Benz 3.4L S8 s/c Mercedes-Benz 3.7L S8 s/c Mercedes-Benz 4.0L S8 s/c Mercedes-Benz 3.7L S8 s/c Mercedes-Benz 4.0L S8 s/c	C	(Germany) Manfred von Brauchitsch	1, 2, 3, 4, 5, 6, 7; B, C, D, [G]
(Germany) Daimler-Benz AG	Mercedes-Benz	W25 W25A; W25B	Mercedes-Benz 3.4L S8 s/c Mercedes-Benz 3.7L S8 s/c Mercedes-Benz 4.0L S8 s/c Mercedes-Benz 3.7L S8 s/c Mercedes-Benz 4.0L S8 s/c	C	(Germany) Hanns Geier	4, 5, 6, 7; C
(Germany) Daimler-Benz AG	Mercedes-Benz	W25 W25A; W25B	Mercedes-Benz 3.4L S8 s/c Mercedes-Benz 3.7L S8 s/c Mercedes-Benz 4.0L S8 s/c Mercedes-Benz 3.7L S8 s/c Mercedes-Benz 4.0L S8 s/c	C	(Germany) Hermann Lang	4, 5, 6; D
(Germany) Auto Union AG	Auto Union	Type A Type B	Auto Union 4.4L V16 s/c Auto Union 4.9L V16 s/c Auto Union 5.6L V16 s/c Auto Union 5.0L V16 s/c	C	(Germany) Hans Stuck	2, 4, 5, 6, 7; B, C, D, F, G
(Germany) Auto Union AG	Auto Union	Type A Type B	Auto Union 4.4L V16 s/c Auto Union 4.9L V16 s/c Auto Union 5.6L V16 s/c Auto Union 5.0L V16 s/c	C	(Italy) Achille Varzi	2, 4, 5, 6, 7; A, B, C, D, [E], F, G
(Germany) Auto Union AG	Auto Union	Type A Type B	Auto Union 4.4L V16 s/c Auto Union 4.9L V16 s/c Auto Union 5.6L V16 s/c Auto Union 5.0L V16 s/c	C	(Germany) Bernd Rosemeyer	2, 4, 5, 6, 7; C, D, [E], F, G
(Germany) Auto Union AG	Auto Union	Type A Type B	Auto Union 4.4L V16 s/c Auto Union 4.9L V16 s/c Auto Union 5.6L V16 s/c Auto Union 5.0L V16 s/c	C	(Germany) Paul Pietsch	4, 5*, 6, 7*; D, G*
(Germany) Auto Union AG	Auto Union	Type A Type B	Auto Union 4.4L V16 s/c Auto Union 4.9L V16 s/c Auto Union 5.6L V16 s/c Auto Union 5.0L V16 s/c	C	(Germany) Hermann, Prinz zu Leiningen	C, D*
(Italy) Scuderia Ferrari	Alfa Romeo	Tipo B 8C-35; Bi-motore	Alfa Romeo 2.9L S8 s/c Alfa Romeo 3.2L S8 s/c Alfa Romeo 3.8L S8 s/c Alfa Romeo 6.3L 2x8 s/c Alfa Romeo 5.8L 2x8 s/c	D/E	(Italy) Tazio Nuvolari	1, 2, 4, 5, 6, 7; A, B, C, E, F, G
(Italy) Scuderia Ferrari	Alfa Romeo	Tipo B 8C-35; Bi-motore	Alfa Romeo 2.9L S8 s/c Alfa Romeo 3.2L S8 s/c Alfa Romeo 3.8L S8 s/c Alfa Romeo 6.3L 2x8 s/c Alfa Romeo 5.8L 2x8 s/c	D/E	(Monaco) Louis Chiron	1, 2, 3, 4, 5, 7; B, C, D, F, G
(Italy) Scuderia Ferrari	Alfa Romeo	Tipo B 8C-35; Bi-motore	Alfa Romeo 2.9L S8 s/c Alfa Romeo 3.2L S8 s/c Alfa Romeo 3.8L S8 s/c Alfa Romeo 6.3L 2x8 s/c Alfa Romeo 5.8L 2x8 s/c	D/E	(France) René Dreyfus	1, 3, 5, 6; B, C, D
(Italy) Scuderia Ferrari	Alfa Romeo	Tipo B 8C-35; Bi-motore	Alfa Romeo 2.9L S8 s/c Alfa Romeo 3.2L S8 s/c Alfa Romeo 3.8L S8 s/c Alfa Romeo 6.3L 2x8 s/c Alfa Romeo 5.8L 2x8 s/c	D/E	(France) Marchese Antonio Brivio	1, 4; E, F, G
(Italy) Scuderia Ferrari	Alfa Romeo	Tipo B 8C-35; Bi-motore	Alfa Romeo 2.9L S8 s/c Alfa Romeo 3.2L S8 s/c Alfa Romeo 3.8L S8 s/c Alfa Romeo 6.3L 2x8 s/c Alfa Romeo 5.8L 2x8 s/c	D/E	(Italy) Attilio Marinoni	3*, 6;
(Italy) Scuderia Ferrari	Alfa Romeo	Tipo B 8C-35; Bi-motore	Alfa Romeo 2.9L S8 s/c Alfa Romeo 3.2L S8 s/c Alfa Romeo 3.8L S8 s/c Alfa Romeo 6.3L 2x8 s/c Alfa Romeo 5.8L 2x8 s/c	D/E	(Italy) Gianfranco Comotti	A, F
(Italy) Scuderia Ferrari	Alfa Romeo	Tipo B 8C-35; Bi-motore	Alfa Romeo 2.9L S8 s/c Alfa Romeo 3.2L S8 s/c Alfa Romeo 3.8L S8 s/c Alfa Romeo 6.3L 2x8 s/c Alfa Romeo 5.8L 2x8 s/c	D/E	(Italy) Carlo Pintacuda	B, F
(Italy) Scuderia Ferrari	Alfa Romeo	Tipo B 8C-35; Bi-motore	Alfa Romeo 2.9L S8 s/c Alfa Romeo 3.2L S8 s/c Alfa Romeo 3.8L S8 s/c Alfa Romeo 6.3L 2x8 s/c Alfa Romeo 5.8L 2x8 s/c	D/E	(Italy) Mario Tadini	B, F
(Italy) Scuderia Subalpina	Maserati Alfa Romeo	Tipo 8CM Tipo 6C-34 V8-R1; 8C-2600; 8C-2300 Monza	Maserati 3.2L S8 s/c Maserati 3.0L S8 s/c Maserati 3.7L S6 s/c Maserati 3.3L S6 s/c Maserati 4.8L V8 s/c Alfa Romeo 2.6L S8 s/c Alfa Romeo 2.3L S8 s/c	?	(Italy) Conte Goffredo Zehender	1, 2, 4, 6, 7; A, B, C, D, E, [F]
(Italy) Scuderia Subalpina	Maserati Alfa Romeo	Tipo 8CM Tipo 6C-34 V8-R1; 8C-2600; 8C-2300 Monza	Maserati 3.2L S8 s/c Maserati 3.0L S8 s/c Maserati 3.7L S6 s/c Maserati 3.3L S6 s/c Maserati 4.8L V8 s/c Alfa Romeo 2.6L S8 s/c Alfa Romeo 2.3L S8 s/c	?	(France) Philippe Étancelin	1, 4, 5, 6; A, B, C, D, E, F
(Italy) Scuderia Subalpina	Maserati Alfa Romeo	Tipo 8CM Tipo 6C-34 V8-R1; 8C-2600; 8C-2300 Monza	Maserati 3.2L S8 s/c Maserati 3.0L S8 s/c Maserati 3.7L S6 s/c Maserati 3.3L S6 s/c Maserati 4.8L V8 s/c Alfa Romeo 2.6L S8 s/c Alfa Romeo 2.3L S8 s/c	?	(Italy) Piero Dusio	1; F
(Italy) Scuderia Subalpina	Maserati Alfa Romeo	Tipo 8CM Tipo 6C-34 V8-R1; 8C-2600; 8C-2300 Monza	Maserati 3.2L S8 s/c Maserati 3.0L S8 s/c Maserati 3.7L S6 s/c Maserati 3.3L S6 s/c Maserati 4.8L V8 s/c Alfa Romeo 2.6L S8 s/c Alfa Romeo 2.3L S8 s/c	?	(Italy) Pietro Ghersi	4, 5v, 6; A, B, [C♠]
(Italy) Scuderia Subalpina	Maserati Alfa Romeo	Tipo 8CM Tipo 6C-34 V8-R1; 8C-2600; 8C-2300 Monza	Maserati 3.2L S8 s/c Maserati 3.0L S8 s/c Maserati 3.7L S6 s/c Maserati 3.3L S6 s/c Maserati 4.8L V8 s/c Alfa Romeo 2.6L S8 s/c Alfa Romeo 2.3L S8 s/c	?	(Italy) Eugenio Siena	[4], [5], 6*, 7; A, B, C
(Italy) Scuderia Subalpina	Maserati Alfa Romeo	Tipo 8CM Tipo 6C-34 V8-R1; 8C-2600; 8C-2300 Monza	Maserati 3.2L S8 s/c Maserati 3.0L S8 s/c Maserati 3.7L S6 s/c Maserati 3.3L S6 s/c Maserati 4.8L V8 s/c Alfa Romeo 2.6L S8 s/c Alfa Romeo 2.3L S8 s/c	?	(Italy) Dr Giuseppe Farina	6;
(Italy) Scuderia Subalpina	Maserati Alfa Romeo	Tipo 8CM Tipo 6C-34 V8-R1; 8C-2600; 8C-2300 Monza	Maserati 3.2L S8 s/c Maserati 3.0L S8 s/c Maserati 3.7L S6 s/c Maserati 3.3L S6 s/c Maserati 4.8L V8 s/c Alfa Romeo 2.6L S8 s/c Alfa Romeo 2.3L S8 s/c	?	(Italy) Guglielmo Carraroli	B
(Italy) Scuderia Subalpina	Maserati Alfa Romeo	Tipo 8CM Tipo 6C-34 V8-R1; 8C-2600; 8C-2300 Monza	Maserati 3.2L S8 s/c Maserati 3.0L S8 s/c Maserati 3.7L S6 s/c Maserati 3.3L S6 s/c Maserati 4.8L V8 s/c Alfa Romeo 2.6L S8 s/c Alfa Romeo 2.3L S8 s/c	?	(Italy) Conte Luigi Della Chiesa	Dv
(France) Automobiles; Ettore Bugatti	Bugatti	Bugatti Type 59/50S; Type 59	Bugatti 4.9L S8 s/c Bugatti 3.3L S8 s/c	?	(France) Robert Benoist	2, 3, 7;
(France) Automobiles; Ettore Bugatti	Bugatti	Bugatti Type 59/50S; Type 59	Bugatti 4.9L S8 s/c Bugatti 3.3L S8 s/c	?	(France) Jean-Pierre Wimille	3, 6, 7; A, G♠
(France) Automobiles; Ettore Bugatti	Bugatti	Bugatti Type 59/50S; Type 59	Bugatti 4.9L S8 s/c Bugatti 3.3L S8 s/c	?	(Italy) Piero Taruffi	3, 4, 6
(France) Automobiles; Ettore Bugatti	Bugatti	Bugatti Type 59/50S; Type 59	Bugatti 4.9L S8 s/c Bugatti 3.3L S8 s/c	?	(France) Pierre Veyron	5v; Gv♠
(United Kingdom) ERA	ERA	B A	ERA 2.0L S6 s/c ERA 1.5L S6 s/c	?	(United Kingdom) Raymond Mays	4, 5v; Dv
(United Kingdom) ERA	ERA	B A	ERA 2.0L S6 s/c ERA 1.5L S6 s/c	?	(Germany) Ernst von Delius	4*
(United Kingdom) ERA	ERA	B A	ERA 2.0L S6 s/c ERA 1.5L S6 s/c	?	(Germany) Hermann, Prinz zu Leiningen	5v
(United Kingdom) ERA	ERA	B A	ERA 2.0L S6 s/c ERA 1.5L S6 s/c	?	(United Kingdom) Humphrey Cook	Dv
(United Kingdom) ERA	ERA	B A	ERA 2.0L S6 s/c ERA 1.5L S6 s/c	?	(United Kingdom) Tim Rose-Richards	Dv
(France) S.E.F.A.C.	S.E.F.A.C.		S.E.F.A.C. 2.8L 2x4 s/c	?	(French Algeria) Marcel Lehoux	[1], 2; [A], [B]
(Spain) Scuderia; Villapadierna	Maserati	Tipo 8CM; Tipo 6C-34	Maserati 3.0L S8 s/c Maserati 3.7L S6 s/c	?	(Spain) Conde José de Villapadierna	1, [3]; [D], E
(Spain) Scuderia; Villapadierna	Maserati	Tipo 8CM; Tipo 6C-34	Maserati 3.0L S8 s/c Maserati 3.7L S6 s/c	?	(French Algeria) Marcel Lehoux	3
(United Kingdom) Earl Howe	Bugatti Delage Maserati	Type 59; 15S8; Tipo 8CM	Bugatti 3.3L S8 s/c Delage 1.5L S8 s/c Maserati 3.0L S8 s/c	?	(United Kingdom) Earl Howe	1, 5v, 5; [B], [F]
(United Kingdom) Earl Howe	Bugatti Delage Maserati	Type 59; 15S8; Tipo 8CM	Bugatti 3.3L S8 s/c Delage 1.5L S8 s/c Maserati 3.0L S8 s/c	?	(United Kingdom) Brian Lewis	5
(Italy) Gino Rovere	Maserati	6C-34	Maserati 3.7L S6 s/c	?	(Italy) Dr Giuseppe Farina	1, 5; A, B, C, [D], [G♠]
(Italy) Gino Rovere	Maserati	6C-34	Maserati 3.7L S6 s/c	?	(Italy) Pietro Ghersi	Dv, Fv
(Italy) Gruppo Genovese; San Giorgio	Alfa Romeo Maserati	Tipo B 8C-3000; 26M	Alfa Romeo 2.6L S8 s/c Maserati 3.0L S8 s/c Maserati 3.0L S8 s/c	?	(Italy) Renato Balestrero	4, 5; A, B, C, D
(Italy) Gruppo Genovese; San Giorgio	Alfa Romeo Maserati	Tipo B 8C-3000; 26M	Alfa Romeo 2.6L S8 s/c Maserati 3.0L S8 s/c Maserati 3.0L S8 s/c	?	(Italy) Archimede Rosa	B
(Switzerland) Ecurie Braillard	Maserati	8CM	Maserati 3.0L S8 s/c	?	(France) Benoît Falchetto	[5♠]; A
(Switzerland) Ecurie Braillard	Maserati	8CM	Maserati 3.0L S8 s/c	?	(France) Robert Brunet	A
(Italy) Franco Sardi	Maserati Alfa Romeo	4CM; Tipo B	Maserati 1.5L S4; Alfa Romeo 2.9L S8 s/c	?	(Italy) Ferdinando Barbieri	5v, 5; A♠, B♠, C♠, Dv, [Fv]

=== Privateer Drivers ===
Entrant	Constructor	Chassis	Engine	Driver	Rounds
Private Entrant	Alfa Romeo	Tipo B	Alfa Romeo 2.9L S8 s/c Alfa Romeo 3.2L S8 s/c	(France) Raymond Sommer	1, 3, 5, 7; A, B
Private Entrant	Maserati	8CM	Maserati 3.0L S8 s/c	(Italy) Luigi Soffietti	1; A, B, E, F
Private Entrant	Maserati	8CM; 6C-34	Maserati 3.0L S8 s/c Maserati 3.7L S6 s/c	(Italy) / (Switzerland) Hans Rüesch]	4, 5; B, [C]
Private Entrant	Maserati	8CM	Maserati 3.0L S8 s/c	(Hungary) László Hartmann	4, 5; A, C, D, G
Private Entrant	Monaco-Trossi		Monaco 4.0L 2x8 radial twin-s/c	(Italy) Conte Carlo Felice Trossi	6;
Private Entrant	Bugatti	Type 51	Bugatti 2.3L S8 s/c	(Spain) Genaro Léoz-Abad	7;
Private Entrant	Maserati	8CM	Maserati 3.0L S8 s/c	(Italy) Piero Taruffi	B, D
Private Entrant	Maserati	8CM	Maserati 3.0L S8 s/c	(Sweden) Per-Viktor Widengren	B
Private Entrant	Bugatti	Type 35	Bugatti 2.3L S8 s/c	(Italy) "Hellé Nice" (Hélène Delangle)	E

‘’Note: ‘’ * indicates only raced in the event as a relief driver,
“♠“ Works driver raced as a privateer in that race,
“v” indicates the driver ran in the Voiturette race,
“†” driver killed during this racing season,
Those in brackets show that, although entered, the driver did not race

== Season review ==
=== Opening at Monaco ===
The start of the year commenced in winter with ice-racing on the frozen lakes of Scandinavia. Both the major races of Norway and Sweden were won by Per-Viktor Widengren in his Alfa Romeo Monza, the only Scandinavian driver to race regularly elsewhere on the continent. Nuvolari re-opened his account with Scuderia Ferrari with a victory at the revised circuit at Pau, after his teammate Dreyfus had led for most of the race.

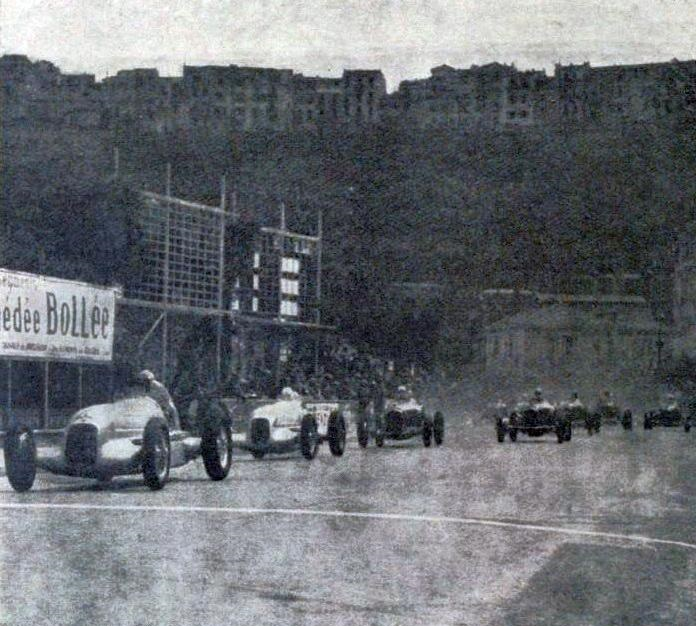
Start of the Monaco GP with Mercedes in front

Two months later, the season proper opened with the Monaco Grand Prix, first event in the rejuvenated European Championship (although technically, the CSI did not authorise the championship to start until May 8). Full teams were sent by Mercedes-Benz (x3), Scuderia Ferrari (four Alfa Romeos) and Scuderia Subalpina (three Maseratis). Neither Auto Union nor Bugatti entered their teams, and the remainder of the field were made up of experienced privateers. These were Frenchman Raymond Sommer (Alfa Tipo B), Italians Giuseppe Farina and Luigi Soffieti, Spaniard Conte de Villapadierna (all Maseratis) and the Englishman Earl Howe in the sole Bugatti. The abortive SEFAC project, although entered, yet again failed to materialise for Marcel Lehoux. The circuit had been modified by levelling off some off-camber corners and moving the chicane 180 metres further from the tunnel to allow more time for braking. As was standard now across France, the grid positions were decided by the fastest times in practice. Von Brauchitsch was impressive breaking the lap record in the second practice on a circuit he had never raced on before, but it was Caracciola who pipped him in the final session, and with Fagioli going third fastest, it was an all-Mercedes front row. Run on Easter Monday, the race was under some political tension as Germany had recently re-occupied the Saarland region on the French border. From the flagfall, von Brauchitsch failed to get away well and it was Fagioli who took the lead from Caracciola, chased by Dreyfus and Nuvolari from the second row. Étancelin was having a good race, lapping faster than Fagioli, and had moved to third by quarter-distance as first Chiron, then Nuvolari, had problems with locked-up brakes. Just before half-distance the Frenchman planted his Maserati inside of Caracciola at the Gasometer hairpin to take second, much to the delight of the parochial crowd.

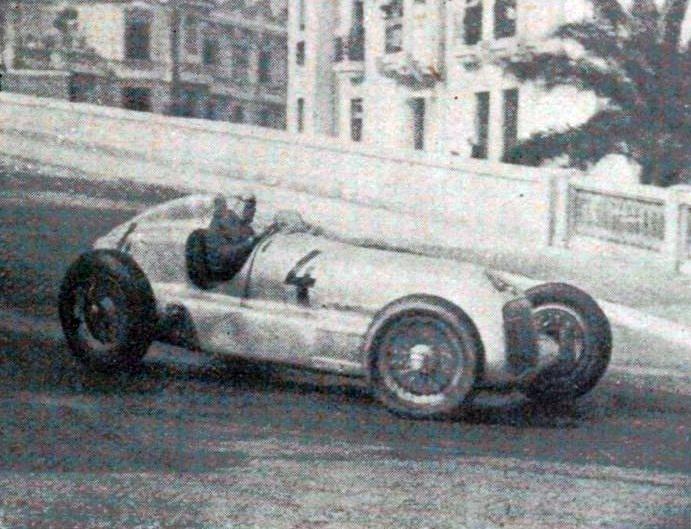
Fagioli, winner of the Monaco GP (Mercedes)

But the effort had taken its toll on his car, and with brakes fading he gradually lost ground. Caracciola retired with engine issues and the Ferrari-Alfas of Dreyfus and Brivio repassed Étancelin. But no-one could catch Fagioli and he took a comfortable victory.

After a year in abeyance, the Tunis Grand Prix returned to the calendar. The two Italian Scuderia, Ferrari and Subalpina had six cars between them, while Wimille arrived for Bugatti and Varzi convinced the Auto Union managers to allow him to bring one of the previous year's A-models. Alongside Ecurie Braillard and the Gruppo Genovese San Giorgio, there were a number of amateurs to make up a big field of 22 starters. Three of the Tipo Bs sold to privateers were present, with Frenchmen Raymond Sommer and "Raph", and Italian 'Nando' Barbieri in the field. In practice, Varzi was over three seconds faster than Nuvolari and Wimille to take pole position. From the start, Varzi leapt into the lead and stayed there for the whole race. In a race of attrition, almost everyone else had problems: Nuvolari had early engine issues and retired; Wimille came second despite his bonnet flying off and almost hitting him. Zehender went off the track and ended upside down in an orange orchard. His Subalpina teammate Étancelin finished third, two laps behind Varzi, after running for most of the race with only top gear.

A week later, the teams met along the coast at Tripoli. The Mellaha track was recognised as one of the fastest on the European circuit and the national lottery attracted a strong field. Mercedes arrived with three cars and Auto Union had two of their new Model B for Varzi and Stuck. Ferrari had five entries including two of the big new Bimotore for their lead drivers. Nuvolari's was fitted with two 3.2-litre engines while Chiron's had twin 2.9-litre engines. Subalpina likewise had five entries – a mix of Maseratis and Alfa Tipo B. Giuseppe Farina ran Gino Rovere's Maserati 6C-34 and among the remaining privateers were Sommer (Tipo B), Widengren, Taruffi and Ruesch (Maseratis). Practice had shown that the combination of the fast circuit and the heat would be a big issue on tyre wear and all the teams had their concerns. As it was, race-day was cloudy with a light wind and the successful lottery tickets for the drivers were drawn just before the start. Initially Caracciola was leading, until a puncture forced him to pit on the fifth lap. By lap ten, Nuvolari had already had two punctures and Varzi and Fagioli had taken over at the front. When they both pitted, Stuck led until his Auto Union had an exhaust fire. With the engine behind him, he was unaware of the danger, until he suddenly found his rear brakes burnt through. Marshals helped him out of the narrow cockpit and put the fire out before the car was destroyed. Meanwhile, Nuvolari's hard driving style was taking a punishing toll on his tyres, and he had to make 13 pit-stops. In the second half of the race Varzi was chased hard by Caracciola. When the latter pitted for his final tyre stop, Varzi got sucked into a duel with his rival Nuvolari, who he was trying to lap. The effort caused a puncture and the time taken to get back to the pits ended up with the German right behind him. With a lap to go, Caracciola passed Varzi who had another puncture that enabled "Caratsch" to ease off for the victory – the first since his big accident at Monaco in 1933.

=== Races in Germany ===
The Avusrennen was another extremely fast race, held on the twin 9 km straights of the AVUS circuit. Instead of a single long race, which proved a bit boring to the spectators the year before, this year's event was run as two heats with the top four in each going to a 10-lap, 200 km final. Once again, tyre wear would be the decider with the very high speeds. The German teams both put a big effort in, entering four cars and both teams had specialised "streamliner" versions of their cars for Rosemeyer and Prinz von Leiningen (Auto Union) and Geier (Mercedes). Ferrari again had the Bimotore for Nuvolari and Chiron, and a Tipo B for Dreyfus. There were also six Maseratis, represented by Subalpina, Gino Rovere and privateers, but there was only a single Bugatti – the 4.9-litre Type 54 of Englishman Dudley Froy. In practice, Stuck easily outpaced all other drivers, over fifteen seconds faster in his Auto Union, and easily won the first heat. Despite being only five laps, Nuvolari, Rosemeyer and Geier all needed to pit for tyres. Froy was completely outclassed, being lapped in a car that had won the event only two years earlier. Caracciola won the second heat when Varzi had to pit for tyres. In the final, Stuck again took the lead, gradually pulling away. However, on the fifth lap he had an alarming moment when a rear tyre blew when he was travelling at 290 km/h. At the halfway point, Fagioli, Varzi and Caracciola were separated by only five seconds, but the German retired with supercharger problems while Varzi had to pit for a third set of tyres. Fagioli took the win, as both he and Chiron (who took a surprising second for Ferrari) had looked after their tyres and not needed to pit.

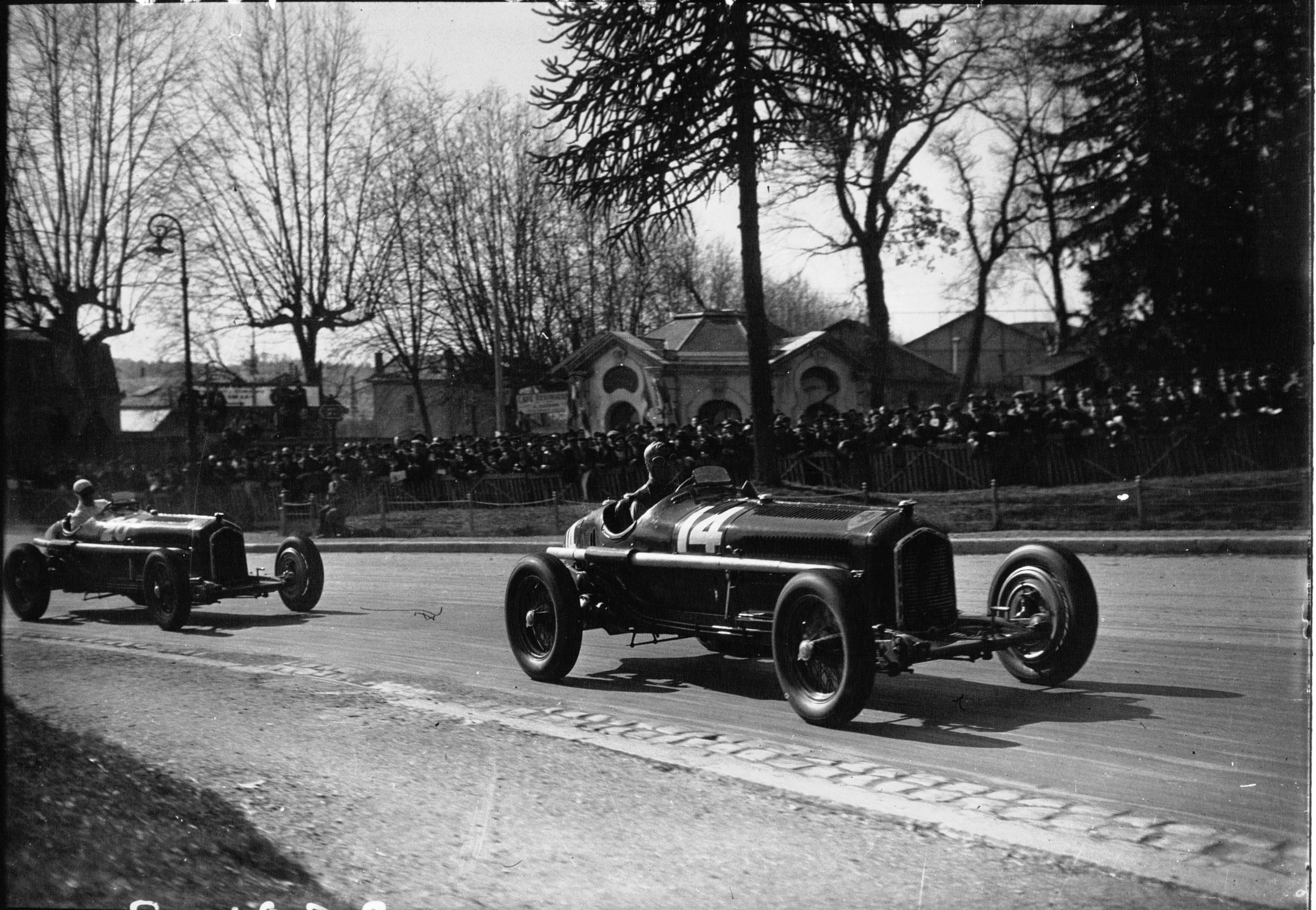
Nuvolari and Dreyfus in their Alfa Romeos, Pau GP

Before the next major European race, at the Nürburgring, the racing attention turned to the United States and the Indianapolis 500 at the end of May. Kelly Petillo won the race and Pete DePaolo became the first person to win the race as a driver and a team-owner. His car had a new Offenhauser engine. Fred Offenhauser had been Harry Miller's foreman and bought out his company when it was declared bankrupt. However, this was all overshadowed by the terrible accidents that killed four people through the practice and the race. Stubby Stubblefield and his mechanic, and Johnny Hannon all died in practice when their cars burst through the outside wall. In the race, Clay Weatherly, driving Hannon's repaired car was killed when he crashed into the infield fence. The week's events forced the organisers to adopt tougher testing of rookie drivers.

Most of the same entrants from Berlin arrived at the Nürburgring for the Eifelrennen. Again the German teams fielded four entrants each, with their regular cars. This time the fourth driver for Auto Union was former privateer driver Paul Pietsch and for Mercedes, Hermann Lang made his racing debut in a smaller, 3.4-litre, car. Ferrari had two of the Tipo Bs for Chiron and Dreyfus, while Nuvolari was attempting a new speed record with the Bimotore.

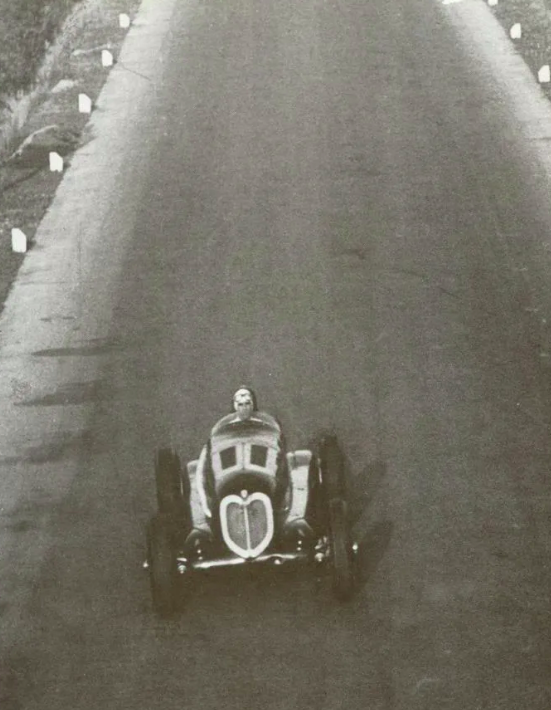
Nuvolari on the Florence autostrada breaking 200mph for Class C

Raceday was cold and wet. Earlier in the day, the British ERAs had dominated the voiturette race taking four of the top five places. The race was won by Raymond Mays and only the Maserati of Hans Rüesch could keep up, finishing second. Varzi had developed appendicitis in the previous few days and was advised not to start, but he insisted. A new coloured-light system had been installed for starting, with a red, orange and delayed green combination. Von Brauchitsch immediately took the lead and quickly had a gap of almost a minute after just 3 of the 11 laps. A number of drivers, including Stuck and Varzi, were pitting to change plugs from the wet electrics. Rosemeyer had started from the fifth row, but despite a windscreen and goggles broken by flying stones, was rapidly moving through the field. The rain returned on the 7th lap and Varzi finally pulled in to be replaced by reserve driver zu Leiningen. In pouring rain, Rosemeyer put in a lap fully 46 seconds faster than Caracciola (the renowned rain-specialist), passing him to take second. When von Brauchitsch over-revved his engine and blew the supercharger, he had the lead in only his second grand prix. As the rain eased, Rosemeyer also had ignition problems and lost two cylinders from his V16 engine. That allowed Caracciola to catch up again and going into the last lap was just seconds behind. Going into the long last straight, he forced the error and at the final corner, Hohenrain, he outbraked Rosemeyer to pass and win by 1.2 seconds. With everyone else having engine issues, Chiron finished third 92 seconds back. However, an auspicious result for Rosemeyer, in only his second race.

=== French Grand Prix ===
This year the entry list was limited to authorised works teams only and up to three cars from each. Mercedes-Benz had B-models for Caracciola and von Brauchitsch while Fagioli ran a W25A. Auto Union also changed their cars with Varzi and Stuck given 5.6-litre engines, while Rosemeyer stayed with the 5-litre version. Scuderia Ferrari represented Alfa Romeo with just two Tipo Bs, for Nuvolari and Chiron (with Dreyfus as reserve). Similarly, Scuderia Subalpina, representing Maserati, had their 6C-34 for Zehender and Raymond Sommer called up for the race. Étancelin had been promised the new V8-R1 model and when that was not ready, refused to race the older model. Bugatti's sole entry, for Robert Benoist, was originally to be a Type 59, but late on Saturday, a brand new car was sent from the factory. Called a Type 59/50S it had 4.9-litre supercharged engine from the Type 54. The final entrant was the long-awaited appearance of the French SEFAC car with Marcel Lehoux. To limit the impact of the powerful German cars, the organisers had installed three tight chicanes. Moreover, portions of the road-section were in poor condition. Practice would decide grid positions: Varzi took pole with a 5m 20s lap, with the Maseratis and Bugatti over fifty seconds slower. Lehoux managed only two practice laps before parking the SEFAC with supercharger problems. It would not be seen again for three years. Nuvolari, on the front row got a good start and was able to pass Stuck for the lead halfway round the opening lap. The Auto Unions were having a bad race, with Varzi pitting with plug misfires and Stuck having brake lock-ups. On lap four, the hood of Benoist's Bugatti came loose and blew off. Retrieving the panel, he made it back to the pits, driving one-handed. Chiron retired after eight laps, crawling into the pits with a broken differential, and Rosemeyer was out soon after with the same brake problems as Stuck. Then on lap 14, Nuvolari came slowly into the pits. When the mechanics examined the rear of the car, they confirmed that his differential was broken too. The three Mercedes now had a lap's lead over the rest of the field. Their dominance continued after the mid-race refuelling, racing in close formation until Fagioli had to pit with a sick engine, and change plugs losing two laps. Rosemeyer had taken over Varzi's troublesome car and on lap 34 made his twelfth stop. Caracciola took the win, just a half second from von Brauchitsch. Fagioli's car was suffering a fuel leak and Zehender was able to overtake him to bring his Maserati home in third place.

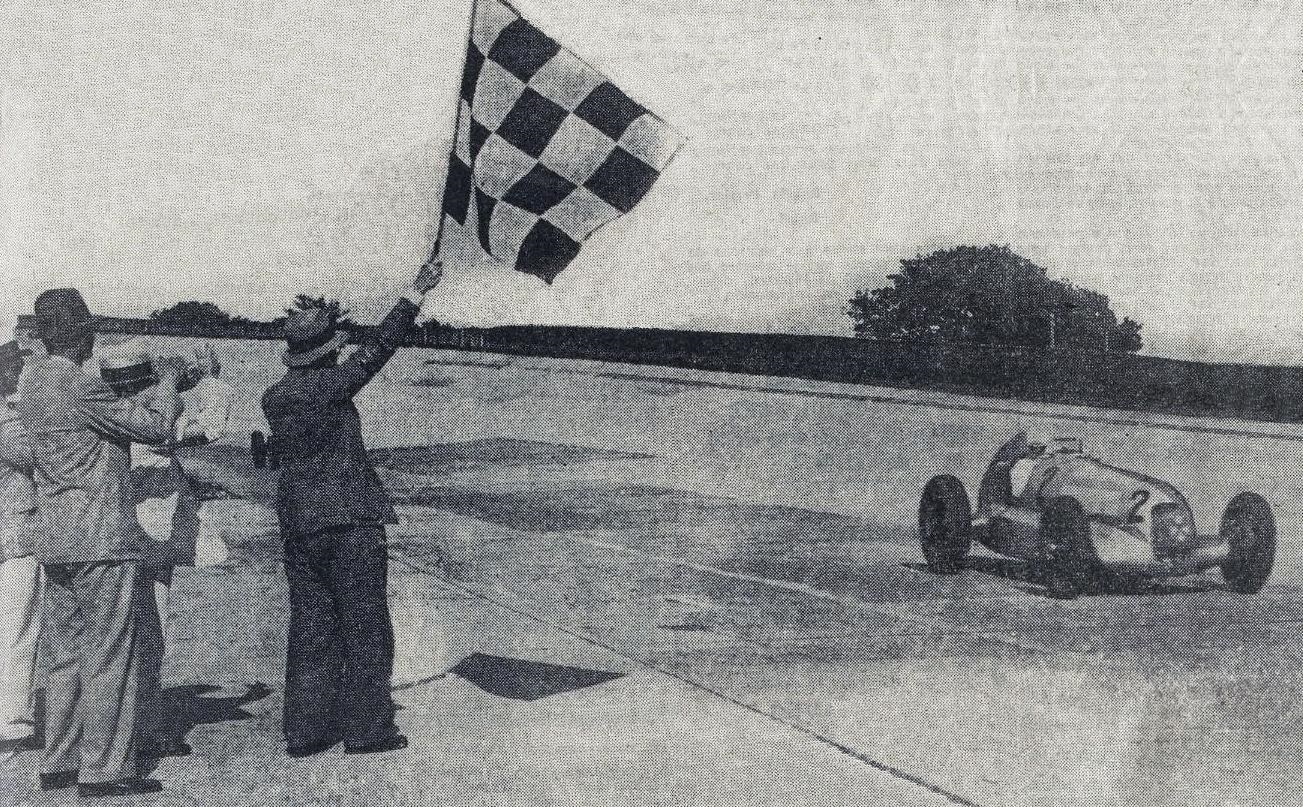
Caracciola winning the French Grand Prix

After their poor showing, Auto Union scratched their entry for the next event, the Penya Rhin GP. That left the Mercedes team as clear favourites. The first practice session had to be cancelled as the Spanish Customs had commandeered the racing fuel. The race ran to the formbook, and this time it was Fagioli taking the win from Caracciola, with Nuvolari third. Run on the same day, the Three Hours of Nancy, was instead a race between Bugatti and the rest of Scuderia Ferrari. It turned into a duel between Chiron and Wimille, decided in favour of the Ferrari driver.

The Belgian Grand Prix was the second round of the European Championship. There were only ten starters as the new Maserati was not ready yet, and the Auto Union team were still upgrading their cars. The three Mercedes lined up against a full team of three Bugattis (Wimille, Benoist and Piero Taruffi). There were three Alfa Romeos; two from Scuderia Ferrari (Nuvolari and Chiron) and one from privateer Raymond Sommer. The final pair of entries were the Maseratis of Conte de Villapadierna. Although the team-owner did not arrive, his driver Marcel Lehoux (who had got fed up with the failed SEFAC project) had a 6C-34 car. With the start line on the slope going down toward the Eau Rouge left-hand corner, several of the cars rolled forward before the flagfall. Caracciola surged to the lead straight away and by the end of the second lap the three Mercedes were established in front. After a strong start, Wimille fell back with engine problems, leaving Chiron and Dreyfus, driving in tandem chasing the German cars. Von Brauchitsch retired his misfiring car on lap 15, then soon after Fagioli sped up and starting harrying his teammate, trying to get past. After two laps of this, Neubauer called Fagioli into the pits. An intense argument ensued about the manager's apparent favouritism towards Caracciola, which ended with the Italian throwing his goggles down and storming out of the pits. Von Brauchitsch was recalled and took over the car, and in making up for lost time, he broke Fagioli's lap record. His hard driving got him back up to second ahead of the Alfas, but Caracciola was uncatchable and took another comfortable victory. After the race there were complaints that Caracciola had jumped the start, owing to his lead at the Eau Rouge corner. CSI regulations introduced the year before stated that a premature-start would take a 1-minute penalty on their final time. This was a moot point as the winning margin was 97 seconds. Photographs of the start also vindicated Caracciola with him barely moving when the flag hit the ground, and accentuated by the very poor starts of Dreyfus and Lehoux ahead of him on the front row. Reporter Charles Faroux, in French automobile magazine l'Auto, raised another complaint. He blamed the illness and exhaustion of Chiron and Dreyfus on them inhaling the toxic exhaust fumes of the Mercedes cars. Certainly, the WW fuel was a potent brew when the cars were idling on the grid. Such was a furore that it compelled the German company to issue a rebuttal. They pointed out three contradictions: that their own drivers had not suffered travelling behind each other; it was the same fuel used earlier at the French Grand Prix with no ill effects; and that the Alfa drivers were almost never following the German cars closely for any length of time, but were left behind as the Mercedes pulled away on them. This all added to the dissatisfaction by the establishment at the German teams' dominance.

=== A classic German Grand Prix ===
For the German teams, and their political masters, this race was the most important event of the year. A quality field of 22 cars was entered. Auto Union had four Type B models, all fitted with the 5.0-litre engine. Drivers would be Stuck, Varzi, Rosemeyer and Pietsch. Mercedes went one better with five cars entered: a mix of A and B models and 4.0-litre engines (Caracciola, Fagioli, von Brauchitsch) and 3.4-litre (Geier and Lang). Ferrari had three cars for Nuvolari (Note: There have been a number of sources claiming Nuvolari had a new 3.8-litre engine fitted to his car. However Snellmann has checked with Alfa Romeo staff that the new engine could not fit into the Tipo B engine bay), Chiron and Antonio Brivio (replacing Dreyfus) while Bugatti only sent Taruffi. There were a number of Maseratis, including three cars for Subalpina (Zehender, Étancelin and Ghersi), San Giorgio's Balestrero and privateers Hartmann and Ruësch. A final, surprising, entry was the pair of works cars from ERA, fitted with 2-litre engines. Owner-driver Raymond Mays was joined by local Ernst von Delius. Auto Union had missed several races to improve their engines, renting the Nürburgring circuit for a week's testing. It worked when they put in the fastest times in practice. The Alfa Romeos only put in a few average laps, but it was apparent that they were quicker than the German cars through the twisty parts of the track. The only incident was when von Delius slid off the road hitting a pine tree. The driver was uninjured but the car would not take the start. After examining their tyres, the Continental manager advised Neubauer that Caracciola's smooth driving would let him get by with a single stop, but von Brauchitsch's aggressive style would need two stops.

A foggy morning saw 250,000 spectators arrive for the race. Heavy rain only abated as the cars were forming up on the grid. Stuck, Nuvolari and Balestrero had drawn the front row by ballot. Once again, the starter lights were used and Nuvolari vaulted into the lead, while Stuck stalled on the grid. His mechanic ran onto the track to assist, which was not allowed. Varzi, coming from the back through the mist and smoke, just missed Stuck but clipped the mechanic, knocking him to the ground unconscious. At the end of the first lap, Caracciola came by with a twelve-second lead from Nuvolari, Fagioli, Rosemeyer and von Brauchitsch. On the second lap, Nuvolari spun at Bergwerk. Facing the wrong way, by the time he had turned around, he had lost 25 seconds and dropped to sixth. By the fifth lap, Nuvolari was the sole Alfa Romeo remaining – both Brivio and Chiron had retired with broken differentials. As the track dried, Rosemeyer broke the lap record to close right up to Caracciola, however on lap 6 he dropped a wheel into the ditch at Breidscheid, damaging his rear suspension and jamming his throttle open. By lap 9 of the 22, the track was drying and Nuvolari put in the fastest lap of the race so far, passing Caracciola to take the lead on the next lap. By now all the Maseratis and the ERA were a lap behind. The leaders all pitted on lap 11, at the halfway point, within 5 seconds of each other. Von Brauchitsch was out first in 47 seconds, then Rosemeyer in 75 seconds. Caracciola had lost a lot of time, coming into the pits in fourth, but left after just over a minute. In a bad pitstop, the Ferrari mechanics broke the fuel unit and had to refill using churns. An apoplectic Nuvolari, having spent 2m14s stationary, roared out in a fury, now down in sixth position. However, the German cars were also having issues – Fagioli with his shock absorbers, Rosemeyer his fuel pump, Varzi distracted with worries of having hit his team's mechanic at the start. In two laps, Nuvolari had blazed his way up to third. After 15 laps, von Brauchitsch had a 97-second lead over Nuvolari, both racing almost ten seconds faster than any other drivers except for a resurgent Rosemeyer back in fifth. Two laps later, the gap was down to 73 seconds. Nuvolari was driving the race of his life – cutting across the inside grass-verges, and using four-wheel drift round the corners. Although taking ten seconds a lap, Neubauer saw there was enough of a lead and signalled to his leader to slow down to preserve his tyres. However, seeing Nuvolari's pace von Brauchitsch pushed hard on lap 21 to build the gap back to 53 seconds. The next time around he signalled the pits his tyres were down to their base. Going into the last lap, Nuvolari was 45 seconds behind then, halfway round at the Karussell, it was down to ten seconds. There von Brauchitsch's rear tyre blew, and the Alfa Romeo was through to take the win. The huge crowd was confounded and stunned into silence. Stuck finished second two minutes back, ahead of Caracciola and Rosemeyer. A disconsolate von Brauchitsch arrived with his rear tyres in shreds for fifth. Embarrassingly, the officials had no copy of the Italian national anthem to play but Nuvolari always carried a copy on record with him. It is rightfully regarded as the 43-year old's finest race, and was suitable revenge on the drivers who had blocked his aspiration to join them. It was also down to Neubauer's (uncharacteristic) strategic mistake to not call in his leader when he had the gap to absorb the 1-minute pit-stop. After the race, doctors found Caracciola had been suffering the effects of a tape-worm, giving him blurred vision and exhaustion.

=== The Mid-Season ===
A week later, Nuvolari dominated the Coppa Ciano leading home a 1-2-3-4 result for the Scuderia Ferrari. A week after that was the Coppa Acerbo. Only a dozen cars arrived this year: Mercedes did not enter, but Auto Union sent three cars. For a home race, Ferrari had six cars and the Scuderia Subalpina finally had the new Maserati V8 RI car for Étancelin. In an eventful practice, there were issues for Ferrari and Auto Union with tyres, affected by the high speed on the long straights and the high temperatures. Varzi was clocked at 295 km/h on a flying kilometre on the downhill straight. Stuck had severe engine problems which could not be repaired in time. Although Varzi offered his car to his team-leader, Stuck declined instead chose to be the reserve driver. After a satisfactory initial practice, the supercharger of Étancelin's new Maserati wrecked itself and he too was a non-starter. In contrast, race-day was overcast and windy. Dick Seaman dominated the preliminary voiturette race in his privateer ERA. The great rivals, Nuvolari and Varzi, started beside each other on the front row of the grid. Varzi was the first back into the town, while third was Rosemeyer who had charged up from the back row of the grid. Varzi kept building his lead while Rosemeyer got past Nuvolari into second. Then on the third lap, Rosemeyer crept slowly into the pits. In the twisty hill section, he had spun at speed going backwards into a ditch before threading the needle between a power pole and a stone wall (subsequently measured as 6 cm narrower than his car). Fitted with a new rear wheel, he took off again in sixth place. After the half-distance pitstops, Varzi had a 4-minute lead over Nuvolari who started pressing harder until his engine broke under him. Rosemeyer had also fought his way back through the field to second, but Varzi was untouchable finishing almost ten minutes ahead of the four Ferrari Alfas who were the only other finishers.

The next round of the European Championship was the Swiss Grand Prix. Excepting Bugatti, the other four works teams were present along with the regular half-down top privateers. Mercedes brought a brand new prototype to trial, lower and slimmer in shape with an 8-cylinder engine. The officials adopted the French idea where practice would decide the starting grid position. However, this was interrupted by a bad accident to Mercedes reserve driver Hanns Geier. Approaching the very fast right-hand kink by the grandstand at 240 km/h, his car suddenly snapped left, hitting the wall before ricocheting across the track. Geier was thrown 20 metres, ending up under a parked truck. In a coma for seven days, he spent four months in hospital. Chiron, coming up quickly, was lucky to miss everything and he down blind through all the dust and smoke. Rain on Saturday meant the Friday practice times were not bettered and Varzi was on pole (2m 42s). Farina, in the fastest Maserati, was 11th and over 20 seconds slower, showing the gulf between the old and new. Early-morning rain had passed and the track was still drying in places. The Prix de Berne voiturette race attracted a strong field with 18 starters. The ERAs were expected to dominate, but it was not by the works cars, that were held back by engine troubles. Instead, it was the two privateers who saw off the field, with a 1-2 result – Seaman taking the win from the Thai Prince 'Bira' (in just his second European race). In the main race, Caracciola beat Varzi off the line and led the first laps from Stuck. Étancelin went wide at the Eymatt corner, into the sandbags, halfway round on the first lap. Varzi clipped the fence avoiding his Maserati next time around that affected his steering. On the seventh lap, Chiron had a serious accident when he slid on gravel and clouted the outside barrier. Thrown out, he was knocked unconscious but otherwise uninjured. Showers returned on the 13th lap, and the front-runners all pitted for rain-tyres. Stuck had lost a tyre tread and with brake and shock absorber problems just gave up in disgust, handing the car over to Pietsch (who had never driven a lap of the circuit). In trying to chase down the leader, Rosemeyer had a lurid slide and spin at Eymatt, dropping a place. After the halfway fuel-stops, Caracciola kept his 1-minute lead over Fagioli and Rosemeyer, with Varzi and Nuvolari a further three minutes back. The race fell into a pattern and Caracciola continued on to win, with his team-mate Fagioli 30 seconds behind. Once again, Rosemeyer had impressed with his driving skill in the rain. Pietsch had pitted almost every other lap making a dozen stops and finished thirteen laps behind. Geier recovered from his injuries but would not race again, returning to the Mercedes team as a timekeeper and assistant team manager.

=== The Italian GP and the end of season ===
This year's Italian Grand Prix featured only works teams. The Germans brought four cars each, as did the Scuderia Subalpina. They had two of the new Maserati V8 RI models, for Étancelin and Giuseppe Farina (bought in for this race). Ferrari only had three cars, with Attilio Marinoni racing for the convalescing Chiron. Bugatti arrived with two Type 59s for Wimille and Trossi, fitted with 3.3-litre engines. The final, and most curious entry was Conte Carlo Felice Trossi's own pet project. The Ferrari director had engineer Augusto Monaco design a unique car. Fitted with a 4-litre air-cooled, 16-cylinder radial engine with twin Zoller superchargers, it developed 240 bhp.

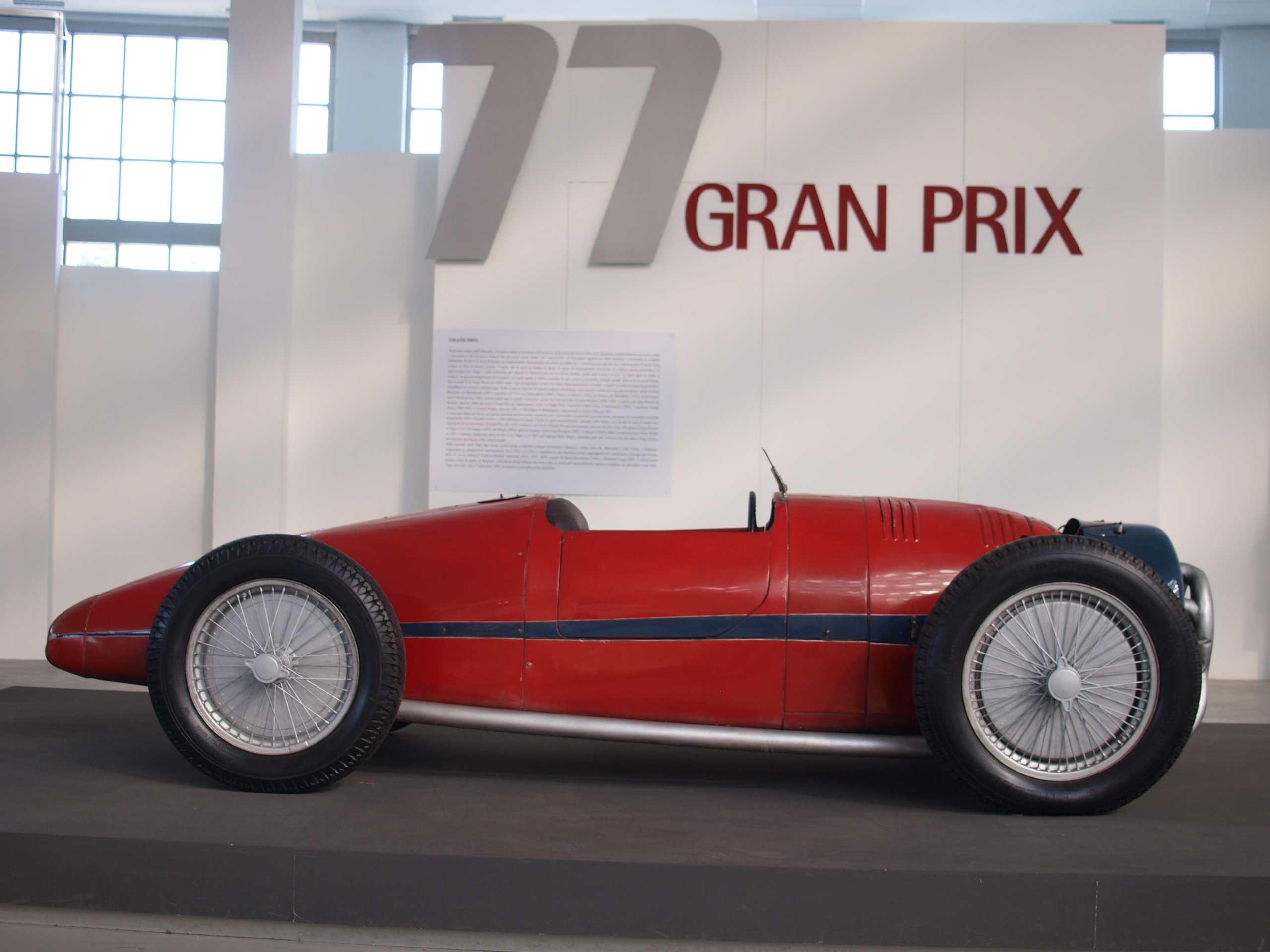
The Monaco-Trossi

Like the French, the Italian officials looked to limit the power of the German cars by putting five chicanes around the Monza circuit, using straw bales. After his heroics in Germany, the Italian crowds were optimistic for Nuvolari. A week of practice was allocated for the teams. Unfortunately, Trossi and his team could not solve ongoing engine problems and withdrew. Farina had piston problems in the morning warm-up and did not take the start, having drawn the pole position in the ballot. From the start, it was the silver cars of Caracciola, Stuck, Varzi and Fagioli that set the pace with Nuvolari, further back, leading the rest. Varzi had got to the front by lap ten but four laps later he pulled over with his engine on fire. At almost the same time, the throttle of Étancelin's Maserati jammed open sending him into a chicane's haybales. The car bounced over a low stone wall, somersaulted and crashed into a tree. The brand new Maserati was wrecked but Étancelin escaped just with cuts and bruises. Pietsch was called in to be replaced by Rosemeyer, whose car had retired with brake issues.

Nuvolari now started his charge, putting in blistering times and setting a new lap record and thrilling the crowd. He briefly led when Stuck and Caracciola both had their mid-race fuel stops. However, on lap 45 Nuvolari's Alfa pulled up on the main straight with a blown piston. Two laps later, when Dreyfus pitted from third, he handed his car over to Nuvolari. In a race of heavy attrition, only five cars finished, with Stuck winning by almost two minutes from Nuvolari with Rosemeyer three laps back. None of the Mercedes finished, all being afflicted by the failure of their rear brake drums.

The final race of the championship was the Spanish Grand Prix, held on the Lasarte circuit in the north of the country in an increasingly tense political climate. The major teams all attended, and Wimille impressed with his pace in the works Bugatti in practice, being able to keep pace with the silver cars. Ferrari unveiled the new Alfa Romeo 8C-35 for Nuvolari, while Chiron was back after his accident at Berne. A crowd of 100,000 arrived on a hot summer day. Stuck led on the first lap, while Varzi had to pit to be relieved by Pietsch, after stones smashed his windscreen dazing him. Rosemeyer had also lost his windscreen and stopped a lap later. By lap 10 Stuck, Caracciola and Fagioli had built a lead, with Wimille a minute back, himself well ahead of the pack. Then on lap 13 Stuck had to pit with clutch problems. Nuvolari's debut with the new Alfa had already ended with engine issues. The stones were also harsh on tyres and bodywork – launched like bullets from the road by the cars. Von Brauchitsch had a tyre delaminate at 230 km/h approaching the grandstands, but was fortunate to be able to pull straight into the pits. Over the rest of the race he pushed hard and eventually overhauled Wimille, who had an excellent race. Mercedes claimed a clean sweep of the podium with Caracciola's victory crowning him as European Champion.

The last major race of the year was the Masaryk Grand Prix, held a week later in Czechoslovakia. The circuit had undergone a major re-surfacing and the corners improved. Although entered, Mercedes-Benz did not arrive. Nuvolari once again ran the new 8C-35 for Ferrari, alongside Chiron and Brivio. Wimille ran his Bugatti as a privateer, while the favourites, though, were the Auto Unions. There was also a voiturette class run beside them, looking to be a showdown between Seaman's ERA and the Bugattis of Veyron and Czech local Bruno Sojka. Despite there only being the nine Group 1 cars, over 150,000 spectators arrived. The Auto Unions quickly fell into formation from the start, led by Varzi. Stuck had to be relieved by Pietsch after being struck by a bird, and at two-thirds distance, Varzi had to retire with a broken gearbox. This left a clear run for Rosemeyer to claim his first Grand Prix victory, winning by over six minutes to Nuvolari and Chiron. Seaman again had the edge over the Bugattis, winning the junior class.

Car-racing at the Donington track had only started in 1933. Unlike Brooklands, which mainly hosted short handicap races, the inaugural Donington Grand Prix, held in October, was an open Formula Libre race. Although the German Grand Prix teams had been invited, they did not enter. Giuseppe Farina arrived with Rovere's brand new Maserati V8-RI, the largest car in the field. Raymond Sommer came across from France with his Alfa Romeo Tipo B, alongside Dick Shuttleworth. There were also the three Bugatti Type 59s of Earl Howe, Charles Martin and Welshman Lindsey Eccles. A heavy rainstorm swept the circuit just a quarter-hour before the start, leaving the track wet. Farina built a good lead initially in the first third of the race, but a broken half-shaft ended his race just after another shower. Sommer was leading at the halfway pitstops but was black-flagged when his bonnet strap came loose, posing a danger. Charging back up the field his race was also ended by a broken half-shaft. That in turn put Martin into the lead, until he had a late-race fuel stop then a spin from failing brakes. This dropped the race into the hands of Dick Shuttleworth, and despite his own brake-fade and a late charge from Earl Howe, he held on for the win, with Martin in third.

Nuvolari's stunning victory at the Nürburgring aside, the season had been dominated by the German teams, who, between them, won every race they entered. However, the win in Germany marked the final Grand Prix win for the Tipo B. The season also saw the arrival of the talented young Bernd Rosemeyer with Auto Union.

== Race results ==
=== Drivers' Race Results ===
Pos	Driver	Team	MON (Monaco)	FRA (France)	BEL (Belgium)	GER (Germany)	SUI (Switzerland)	ITA (Italy)	ESP (Spain)	Pts	TUN (French protectorate of Tunisia)	TRI (Libya)	AVS (Germany)	EIF (Germany)	PYR (Spain)	CAC (Italy)	MSK (Czechoslovakia)
1	(Germany) Rudolf Caracciola	Daimler-Benz AG	**Ret***	1	1	3	1	Ret	1	**(16*) 17**		1	Ret	1	2		
2	(Italy) Luigi Fagioli	Daimler-Benz AG	1	4	2	6	2	Ret	2	**22**		3	1	4	1		
3	(Germany) Manfred von Brauchitsch	Daimler-Benz AG	Ret*	2	Ret [2]*	5	Ret *	Ret	3	**(31*) 34**		Ret	5	Ret			
4	(Italy) Tazio Nuvolari	Scuderia Ferrari	Ret	Ret*		1	5	Ret [2]	Ret*	**(37*) 35**	Ret	4	DNQ		3	Ret	2
5	(Germany) Hans Stuck	Auto Union AG		Ret		**2**	11*	1	Ret	**(37*) 36**		Ret	4	Ret		DNS	Ret
=	(France) René Dreyfus	Scuderia Ferrari	2	[Res]*	4	[Res]	7	2	[Res]	**(35*) 36**		6	6	7			
7	(Germany) Bernd Rosemeyer	Auto Union AG		Ret [5]		4	3	Ret [3]	5	**39**			DNQ	2		2	1
=	(Italy) Achille Varzi	Auto Union AG		**5**		8	**4**	Ret	Ret*	**(40) 39**	**1**	2	3	9		1	Ret
=	(France) Raymond Sommer	Private Entry; Scuderia Subalpina	6	6	Ret		9		7	**39**	Ret	7					
10	(Monaco) Louis Chiron	Scuderia Ferrari	5	Ret	3	Ret	Ret		Ret	**40**		5	2	3		6	3
11	(Italy) Goffredo Zehender	Scuderia Subalpina	7	3		11		Ret		**42**	Ret	8	DNQ	Ret	5		
12	(Germany) Hermann Lang	Daimler-Benz AG				Ret	6	Ret		**45**				5			
13	(France) Robert Benoist	Automobiles Ettore Bugatti		Ret*	5				6	**46**							
=	(France) Philippe Étancelin	Scuderia Subalpina	4			Ret	Ret	Ret		**46**	3	Ret	DNQ	8	Ret	DNS	
15	(Italy) Piero Taruffi	Automobiles Ettore Bugatti; Private Entry			7	Ret		5	[Res]	**47**		Ret		Ret			
=	(Germany) Paul Pietsch	Auto Union AG				9	[11]	3	[Ret]	**47**				6			[Ret]
17	(French Algeria) Marcel Lehoux	SEFAC; Scuderia Villapadierna		DNS	6				8	**48**							
18	(France) Jean-Pierre Wimille	Automobiles Ettore Bugatti			Ret			Ret	4	**49**	2						Ret
19	(Italy) Antonio Brivio	Scuderia Ferrari	3			Ret				**50**		Ret			4	3	4
=	(United Kingdom) Earl Howe	Earl Howe	Ret				10			**50**							
21	(Italy) Pietro Ghersi	Scuderia Subalpina				12		Ret		**51**	Ret	Ret					
=	(Italy) Renato Balestrero	Gruppo Genovese San Giorgio				Ret	12			**51**	Ret	Ret	DNQ	Ret			
=	(Italy) Giuseppe Farina	G. Rovere; Scuderia Subalpina	Ret				8	DNS		**51**	5	Ret	DNQ				
24	(Italy) Attilio Marinoni	Scuderia Ferrari			[4]			4		**52**							
=	(Germany) Hanns Geier	Daimler-Benz AG				7		DNS		**52**			Ret				
=	(Italy) Luigi Soffietti	Private Entry	8							**52**	Ret	Ret			6	Ret	
=	(Switzerland) Hans Rüesch	Private Entry				10	DNS			**52**		Ret					
=	(Hungary) László Hartmann	Private Entry				Ret	Ret			**52**	7		DNQ	Ret			5
29	(Spain) José de Villapadierna	Scuderia Villapadierna	Ret							**53**					Ret		
=	(United Kingdom) Raymond Mays	ERA				Ret				**53**							
=	(Spain) Genaro Léoz-Abad	Private Entry							Ret	**53**							
32	(Italy) Piero Dusio	Scuderia Subalpina	Ret	[Res]						**55**						Ret	
=	(Italy) Ferdinando Barbieri	Private Entry; F. Sardi					Ret			**55**	Ret	Ret	DNQ				
=	(United Kingdom) Brian Lewis	Earl Howe					Ret			**55**							
=	(Italy) Eugenio Siena	Scuderia Subalpina							Ret	**55**	Ret	Ret	DNQ				
	(Italy) Gianfranco Comotti	Scuderia Ferrari									4					4	
	(Italy) Mario Tadini	Scuderia Ferrari										10				5	
	(France) Albert 'Raymond' Chambost	Private Entry									6						
Pos	Driver	Team	1 (Monaco)	2 (France)	3 (Belgium)	4 (Germany)	5 (Switzerland)	6 (Italy)	7 (Spain)	Pts	A (Tunisia)	B (Libya)	C (Germany)	D (Germany)	E (Spain)	F (Italy)	G (Czechoslovakia)

Bold font indicates starting on pole position, while italics show the driver of the race's fastest lap.
The results of reserve or relieving drivers are shown with [square brackets]
All drivers who started a Championship race are shown, while only those drivers with a best finish of 6th or better in the non-Championship races, or a fastest lap, are shown. Sources:

- The published CSI points (in brackets) are incorrect, according to their own rules for points' allocation. Table is updated by Snellman & Etzrodt from their forensic review, according to the points for the actual time of retirement from the official race results.

=== Manufacturers' Race Results ===
Pos	Manufacturer	MON (Monaco)	FRA (France)	BEL (Belgium)	GER (Germany)	SUI (Switzerland)	ITA (Italy)	ESP (Spain)	TUN (Tunisia)	TRI (Libya)	AVS (Germany)	EIF (Germany)	PYR (Spain)	CAC (Italy)	MSK (Czechoslovakia)
	(Germany) Mercedes-Benz	1	1	1	3	1	Ret	1		1	1	1	1		
	(Italy) Alfa Romeo	2	Ret	3	1	5	4	7	4	4	2	3	3	3	2
	(Germany) Auto Union		5		2	3	1	5	1	2	3	2		1	1
	(Italy) Maserati	4	3	6	10	8	Ret	Ret	3	8	DNQ	8	5	Ret	5
	(France) Bugatti		Ret	5	Ret	10	5	4	2		DNQ	Ret	Ret		Ret
	(United Kingdom) ERA				Ret										
	(France) SEFAC		DNS												

Colour	Result	Points
Gold	Winner	1
Silver	2nd place	2
Bronze	3rd place	3
Green	Completed more than 75%	4
Blue	Completed between 50% and 75%	5
Purple	Completed between 25% and 50%	6
Red	Completed less than 25%	7
Black	Disqualified	8
Blank	Did not participate	8

Footnotes

Citations
