= 1935 Italian Grand Prix =

- Race 6 of 7 in the 1935 European Championship

Race details
- Date: 8 September 1935
- Official name: XIII Gran Premio d'Italia
- Location: Autodromo Nazionale di Monza; Monza, Italy
- Course: Permanent racing facility
- Course length: 6.95 km (4.32 miles)
- Distance: 73 laps, 507.35 km (315.36 miles)

Pole position
Driver	(Italy) Giuseppe Farina	Maserati
- Grid positions set by ballot

Fastest lap
Driver	(Italy) Tazio Nuvolari	Alfa Romeo
- Time: 2:49.8

Podium
First	(Germany) Hans Stuck	Auto Union
Second	(France) René Dreyfus; (Italy) Tazio Nuvolari	Alfa Romeo
Third	(Germany) Paul Pietsch; (Germany) Bernd Rosemeyer	Auto Union

The 1935 Italian Grand Prix was a Grand Prix motor race held at Monza on 8 September 1935.

== Classification ==
Pos	No	Driver	Team	Car	Laps	Time/Retired	Grid	Points
1	12	(Germany) Hans Stuck	Auto Union	Auto Union B	73	3:40:09	5	1
2	20	(France) René Dreyfus	Scuderia Ferrari	Alfa Romeo 8C-35	73	+1:41	9	2
2	20	(Italy) Tazio Nuvolari	Scuderia Ferrari	Alfa Romeo 8C-35	73	+1:41	9	n/a
3	36	(Germany) Paul Pietsch	Auto Union	Auto Union B	70	+3 Laps	17	3
3	36	(Germany) Bernd Rosemeyer	Auto Union	Auto Union B	70	+3 Laps	17	n/a
4	28	(Italy) Attilio Marinoni	Scuderia Ferrari	Alfa Romeo Tipo B	68	+5 Laps	13	4
5	4	(Italy) Piero Taruffi	Bugatti	Bugatti T59	59	+14 Laps	2	4
Ret	34	(Germany) Hermann Lang	Daimler-Benz AG	Mercedes-Benz W25	55	Engine	16	4
Ret	10	(Italy) Tazio Nuvolari	Scuderia Ferrari	Alfa Romeo 8C-35	45		4	5
Ret	26	(Germany) Manfred von Brauchitsch	Daimler-Benz AG	Mercedes-Benz W25	42	Accident	12	5
Ret	6	(Germany) Rudolf Caracciola	Daimler-Benz AG	Mercedes-Benz W25	41	Transmission	3	5
Ret	6	(Italy) Luigi Fagioli	Daimler-Benz AG	Mercedes-Benz W25	41	Transmission	3	n/a
Ret	16	(France) Jean-Pierre Wimille	Bugatti	Bugatti T59	27		7	6
Ret	30	(Germany) Bernd Rosemeyer	Auto Union	Auto Union B	19	Rear axle	14	6
Ret	24	(Italy) Goffredo Zehender	Scuderia Subalpina	Maserati 6C-34	15	Mechanical	11	7
Ret	14	(France) Philippe Étancelin	Scuderia Subalpina	Maserati V8-RI	15	Accident	6	7
Ret	22	(Italy) Achille Varzi	Auto Union	Auto Union B	14	Engine	10	7
Ret	18	(Italy) Luigi Fagioli	Daimler-Benz AG	Mercedes-Benz W25	11		8	7
Ret	32	(Italy) Pietro Ghersi	Scuderia Subalpina	Maserati 6C-34	4	Engine	8	7
DNS	2	(Italy) Giuseppe Farina	Scuderia Subalpina	Maserati V8-RI		Engine	1	8

== Notes ==
- Paul Pietsch and René Dreyfus were called in so that Bernd Rosemeyer and Tazio Nuvolari, respectively, could take over their cars.

Grand Prix Race
Previous race: 1935 Swiss Grand Prix	1935 Grand Prix season Grandes Épreuves	Next race: 1935 Spanish Grand Prix
Previous race: 1934 Italian Grand Prix	Italian Grand Prix	Next race: 1936 Italian Grand Prix
