= 1935 Monaco Grand Prix =

Grand Prix race held in Monaco in 1935

The 1935 Monaco Grand Prix (formally the VII Grand Prix de Monaco) was a Grand Prix motor race held on 22 April 1935.

== Classification ==
Pos	No	Driver	Team	Car	Laps	Time/Retired	Grid
1	4	(Italy) Luigi Fagioli	Daimler-Benz AG	Mercedes-Benz W25K	100	3:23:49.8	3
2	18	(France) René Dreyfus	Scuderia Ferrari	Alfa Romeo Tipo B/P3	100	+31.5	4
3	22	(Italy) Antonio Brivio	Scuderia Ferrari	Alfa Romeo Tipo B/P3	100	+1:06.4	6
4	24	(France) Philippe Étancelin	Scuderia Subalpina	Maserati 6C-34	99	+1 lap	9
5	16	(Monaco) Louis Chiron	Scuderia Ferrari	Alfa Romeo Tipo B/P3	97	+3 laps	7
6	14	(France) Raymond Sommer	Private entry	Alfa Romeo Tipo B/P3	94	+6 laps	8
7	26	(Italy) Goffredo Zehender	Scuderia Subalpina	Maserati 8CM	93	+7 laps	10
8	32	(Italy) Luigi Soffietti	Private entry	Maserati 8CM	91	+9 laps	13
DNF	2	(Germany) Rudolf Caracciola	Daimler-Benz AG	Mercedes-Benz W25K	65	Broken valve	1
DNF	10	(Spain) José de Villapadierna	Private entry	Maserati 8CM	65	Crash	15
DNF	20	(Italy) Tazio Nuvolari	Scuderia Ferrari	Alfa Romeo Tipo B/3	53	Brakes	5
DNF	20	(Italy) Carlo Felice Trossi	Scuderia Ferrari	Alfa Romeo Tipo B/3	53	Brakes	5
DNF	8	(United Kingdom) Earl Howe	Private entry	Bugatti T59	34	Brakes/crash	12
DNF	30	(Italy) Giuseppe Farina	Gino Rovere	Maserati 6C-34	21	Fuel feed/valve?	11
DNF	28	(Italy) Piero Dusio	Scuderia Subalpina	Maserati 8CM	3	Crash	14
DNF	6	(Germany) Manfred von Brauchitsch	Daimler-Benz AG	Mercedes-Benz W25K	1	Gearbox	2

Fastest lap: Luigi Fagioli, 1:58.4 (96.7 km/h - 60.1 mph)

Grand Prix Race
Previous race: 1934 Spanish Grand Prix	1935 Grand Prix season Grandes Épreuves	Next race: 1935 French Grand Prix
Previous race: 1934 Monaco Grand Prix	Monaco Grand Prix	Next race: 1936 Monaco Grand Prix
