= 1935 French Grand Prix =

- Race 2 of 7 in the 1935 European Championship

Race details
- Date: 23 June 1935
- Official name: XXIX Grand Prix de l'Automobile Club de France
- Location: Montlhéry, France
- Course: Autodrome de Linas-Montlhéry
- Course length: 12.50 km (7.767 miles)
- Distance: 40 laps, 500.0 km (310.7 miles)

Pole position
| Driver | (Italy) Achille Varzi | Auto Union |
- Time: 5:20.1

Fastest lap
| Driver | (Italy) Tazio Nuvolari | Alfa Romeo |
- Time: 5:29.1

Podium
| First | (Germany) Rudolf Caracciola | Mercedes-Benz |
| Second | (Germany) Manfred von Brauchitsch | Mercedes-Benz |
| Third | (Italy) Goffredo Zehender | Maserati |

The 1935 French Grand Prix (formally the XXIX Grand Prix de l'Automobile Club de France) was a Grand Prix motor race which was held at Montlhéry, France on 23 June 1935. The race lasted 500 km (12.5 km x 40 laps) and was won by Rudolf Caracciola driving a Mercedes-Benz.

== Background ==
For the first time, the Automobile Club of France decided that the grid positions should be set by practice times, rather than by ballot, a practice introduced in Europe at the Monaco Grand Prix.

Having witnessed the more powerful German cars winning nearly every race they entered (notably not the 1934 French Grand Prix), the organisers decided to reduce the speeds of the Montlhéry circuit by installing three slow chicanes. This was ultimately successful in ensuring the competitiveness of the Alfa Romeos, with Tazio Nuvolari able to set second fastest time in practice, and completing the fastest lap of the race, albeit 23 seconds slower than last year's fastest lap due to the chicanes.

== Starting Grid (3x2) ==
| Grid | No | Driver | Car | Time |
|---|---|---|---|---|
| 1 | 8 | (Italy) Achille Varzi | Auto Union B | 5:20.1 |
| 2 | 14 | (Italy) Tazio Nuvolari | Alfa Romeo Tipo-B P3 | 5:23.6 |
| 3 | 10 | (Germany) Hans Stuck | Auto Union B | 5:28.8 |
| 4 | 2 | (Germany) Rudolf Caracciola | Mercedes-Benz W25 | 5:31.6 |
| 5 | 16 | (Monaco) Louis Chiron | Alfa Romeo Tipo-B P3 | 5:31.9 |
| 6 | 12 | (Germany) Bernd Rosemeyer | Auto Union B | 5:36.6 |
| 7 | 6 | (Italy) Luigi Fagioli | Mercedes-Benz W25 | 5:37.9 |
| 8 | 4 | (Germany) Manfred von Brauchitsch | Mercedes-Benz W25 | 5:46.6 |
| 9 | 24 | (France) Robert Benoist | Bugatti T59/50 | |
| 10 | 18 | (Italy) Goffredo Zehender | Maserati Tipo 34 | 6:10.8 |
| 11 | 20 | (France) Raymond Sommer | Maserati 8CM | |
| DNQ | 22 | (France) Marcel Lehoux | S.E.F.A.C. | Practiced only |

== Classification ==
| Pos | No | Driver | Car | Laps | Time/Retire |
|---|---|---|---|---|---|
| 1 | 2 | (Germany) Rudolf Caracciola | Mercedes-Benz W25B | 40 | 4h00m54.6 |
| 2 | 4 | (Germany) Manfred von Brauchitsch | Mercedes-Benz W25B | 40 | +0.5 |
| 3 | 18 | (Italy) Goffredo Zehender | Maserati Tipo 34 | 38 | +2 laps |
| 4 | 6 | (Italy) Luigi Fagioli | Mercedes-Benz W25B | 37 | +3 laps |
| 5 | 8 | (Italy) Achille Varzi (Germany) Bernd Rosemeyer | Auto Union B | 35 | +5 laps |
| 6 | 20 | (France) Raymond Sommer | Maserati 8CM | 35 | +5 laps |
| NC | 24 | (France) Robert Benoist | Bugatti T59/50 | 16 | Not Classified |
| Ret | 14 | (Italy) Tazio Nuvolari | Alfa Romeo Tipo-B P3 | 14 | Transmission |
| Ret | 12 | (Germany) Bernd Rosemeyer | Auto Union B | 11 | Spark plugs/transmission? |
| Ret | 16 | (Monaco) Louis Chiron | Alfa Romeo Tipo-B P3 | 8 | Transmission |
| Ret | 10 | (Germany) Hans Stuck | Auto Union B | 7 | Brakes |

Fastest Lap: Tazio Nuvolari (Alfa Romeo Tipo-B P3) 5:29.1, 136.74 km/h

Grand Prix Race
| Previous race: 1935 Monaco Grand Prix | 1935 Grand Prix season Grandes Épreuves | Next race: 1935 Belgian Grand Prix |
| Previous race: 1934 French Grand Prix | French Grand Prix | Next race: 1936 French Grand Prix |
