= 1935 Belgian Grand Prix =

- Race 3 of 7 in the 1935 European Championship
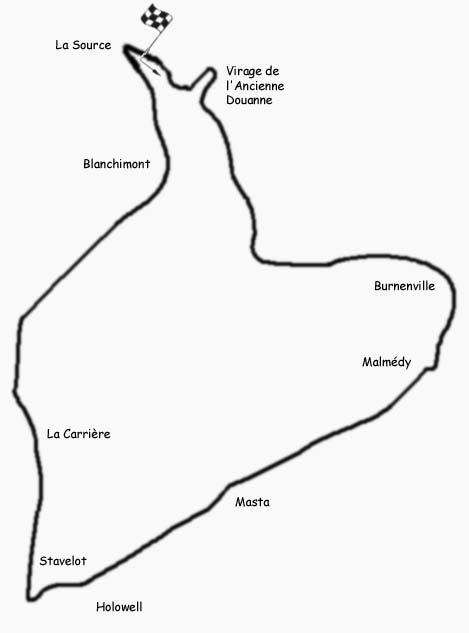

Race details
- Date: 14 July 1935
- Official name: VI Grand Prix de Belgique
- Location: Spa-Francorchamps; Spa, Belgium
- Course: Road course
- Course length: 14.95 km (9.29 miles)
- Distance: 34 laps, 508.3 km (315.8 miles)
- Weather: Dry, hot

Pole position
Driver	(France) Marcel Lehoux	Maserati
- Grid positions set by ballot

Fastest lap
Driver	(Germany) Manfred von Brauchitsch	Mercedes-Benz
- Time: 5:23

Podium
First	(Germany) Rudolf Caracciola	Mercedes-Benz
Second	(Italy) Luigi Fagioli; (Germany) Manfred von Brauchitsch	Mercedes-Benz
Third	(Monaco) Louis Chiron	Alfa Romeo

The 1935 Belgian Grand Prix was a Grand Prix motor race held at Spa-Francorchamps on 14 July 1935.

== Classification ==
=== Race ===
Pos	No	Driver	Team	Car	Laps	Time/Retired	Grid	Points
1	2	(Germany) Rudolf Caracciola	Daimler-Benz AG	Mercedes-Benz W25B	34	3:12:31	5	1
2	6	(Italy) Luigi Fagioli	Daimler-Benz AG	Mercedes-Benz W25B	34	+1:37	10	2
2	6	(Germany) Manfred von Brauchitsch	Daimler-Benz AG	Mercedes-Benz W25B	34	+1:37	10	n/a
3	14	(Monaco) Louis Chiron	Scuderia Ferrari	Alfa Romeo Tipo B	34	+2:16	3	3
4	16	(France) René Dreyfus	Scuderia Ferrari	Alfa Romeo Tipo B	34	+5:23	2	4
4	16	(Italy) Attilio Marinoni	Scuderia Ferrari	Alfa Romeo Tipo B	34	+5:23	2	n/a
5	8	(France) Robert Benoist	Bugatti	Bugatti T59	31	+ 3 Laps	9	4
6	20	(France) Marcel Lehoux	Scuderia Villapadierna	Maserati 8CM	31	+ 3 Laps	1	4
7	12	(Italy) Piero Taruffi	Bugatti	Bugatti T59	31	+3 Laps	7	4
Ret	4	(Germany) Manfred von Brauchitsch	Daimler-Benz AG	Mercedes-Benz W25B	15	Engine	6	6
Ret	18	(France) Raymond Sommer	Private entry	Alfa Romeo Tipo B	7	Mechanical	8	7
Ret	10	(France) Jean-Pierre Wimille	Bugatti	Bugatti T59	7	Engine	4	7

=== Starting grid positions ===
1st Row		1 Pos.		2 Pos.	
		(France); Lehoux; Maserati		(France); Dreyfus; Alfa Romeo	
2nd Row	1 Pos.		2 Pos.		3 Pos.
	(Monaco); Chiron; Alfa Romeo		(France); Wimille; Bugatti		(Germany); Caracciola; Mercedes-Benz
3rd Row		1 Pos.		2 Pos.	
		(Germany) von Brauchitsch; Mercedes-Benz		(Italy); Taruffi; Bugatti	
4th Row	1 Pos.		2 Pos.		3 Pos.
	(France); Sommer; Alfa Romeo		(France); Benoist; Bugatti		(Italy); Fagioli; Mercedes-Benz

== Notes ==
- Manfred von Brauchitsch took Luigi Fagioli's car after Fagioli walked off due to an argument with team boss Alfred Neubauer.
- René Dreyfus became ill after inhaling exhaust fumes and handed his car over to Attilio Marinoni.

Grand Prix Race
Previous race: 1935 French Grand Prix	1935 Grand Prix season Grandes Épreuves	Next race: 1935 German Grand Prix
Previous race: 1934 Belgian Grand Prix	Belgian Grand Prix	Next race: 1937 Belgian Grand Prix
