= 1935 Spanish Grand Prix =

- Race 7 of 7 in the 1935 European Championship
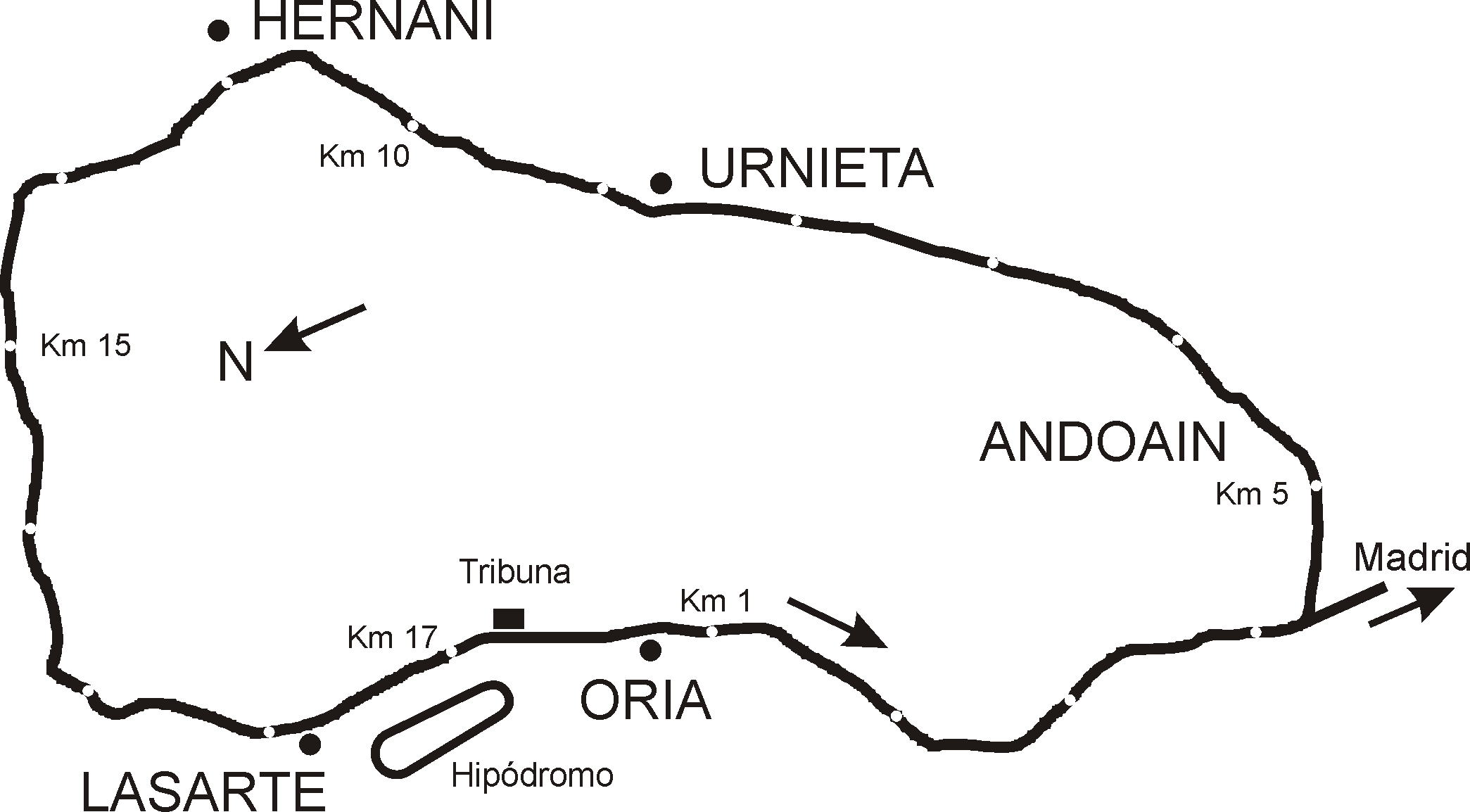

Race details
- Date: 22 September 1935
- Official name: X Gran Premio de España
- Location: Circuito Lasarte; Lasarte-Oria, Spain
- Course: Road course
- Course length: 17.32 km (10.76 miles)
- Distance: 30 laps, 519.45 km (322.77 miles)

Pole position
Driver	(France) Jean-Pierre Wimille	Bugatti
- Grid positions set by car number

Fastest lap
Driver	(Italy) Achille Varzi	Auto Union
- Time: 5:58.0

Podium
First	(Germany) Rudolf Caracciola	Mercedes-Benz
Second	(Italy) Luigi Fagioli	Mercedes-Benz
Third	(Germany) Manfred von Brauchitsch	Mercedes-Benz

The 1935 Spanish Grand Prix was a Grand Prix motor race held at Lasarte on 22 September 1935.

== Classification ==
Pos	No	Driver	Team	Car	Laps	Time/Retired	Grid	Points
1	26	(Germany) Rudolf Caracciola	Daimler-Benz AG	Mercedes-Benz W25B	30	3:09:59.4	13	1
2	8	(Italy) Luigi Fagioli	Daimler-Benz AG	Mercedes-Benz W25B	30	+43.0	4	2
3	22	(Germany) Manfred von Brauchitsch	Daimler-Benz AG	Mercedes-Benz W25B	30	+2:14.6	11	3
4	2	(France) Jean-Pierre Wimille	Bugatti	Bugatti T59	30	+2:55.4	1	4
5	4	(Germany) Bernd Rosemeyer	Auto Union	Auto Union B	30	+5:51.6	2	4
6	12	(France) Robert Benoist	Bugatti	Bugatti T59	29	+1 Lap	6	4
Ret	20	(Monaco) Louis Chiron	Scuderia Ferrari	Alfa Romeo Tipo B	28	Driver unwell	10	4
7	28	(France) Raymond Sommer	Private entry	Alfa Romeo Tipo B	27	+3 Laps	14	4
8	24	(France) Marcel Lehoux	Scuderia Subalpina	Maserati 6C-34	25	+5 Laps	12	4
Ret	6	(Italy) Achille Varzi	Auto Union	Auto Union B	25	Piston	3	4
Ret	6	(Germany) Paul Pietsch	Auto Union	Auto Union B	25	Piston	3	n/a
Ret	30	(Spain) Genaro Léoz-Abad	Private entry	Bugatti	22		15	5
Ret	10	(Germany) Hans Stuck	Auto Union	Auto Union B	14	Transmission	5	6
Ret	16	(Italy) Tazio Nuvolari	Scuderia Ferrari	Alfa Romeo 8C-35	8	Suspension	8	6
Ret	14	(Italy) Eugenio Siena	Scuderia Subalpina	Maserati 6C-34	2	Mechanical	7	7

== Notes ==
- Paul Pietsch took over from Achille Varzi after the latter's face was cut due to a stone smashing his windscreen. After treatment, Varzi took the car back but gave it back to Pietsch after it developed a gearbox problem.

Grand Prix Race
Previous race: 1935 Italian Grand Prix	1935 Grand Prix season Grandes Épreuves	Next race: 1936 Monaco Grand Prix
Previous race: 1934 Spanish Grand Prix	Spanish Grand Prix	Next race: 1951 Spanish Grand Prix
