= Mercedes-Benz Grand Prix results =

These are the complete European Championship and Formula One results for Mercedes-Benz.

== Complete European Championship results ==
(key) (results in bold indicate pole position, results in italics indicate fastest lap)

Year	Chassis	Engine	Tyres	Drivers	1	2	3	4	5	6	7
1935	W25A; W25B	M25A 3.4 L8; M25B 4.0 L8	C		MON	FRA	BEL	GER	SUI	ITA	ESP
1935	W25A; W25B	M25A 3.4 L8; M25B 4.0 L8	C	(Germany) Rudolf Caracciola	**Ret**	1	1	3	1	Ret (Note: After Caracciola's car developed mechanical problems, he gave up and Fagioli took over as his car had already retired.)	1
1935	W25A; W25B	M25A 3.4 L8; M25B 4.0 L8	C	(Italy) Luigi Fagioli	1	4	2 (Note: Von Brauchitsch took over Fagioli's car after his own retired.)	6	2	Ret	2
1935	W25A; W25B	M25A 3.4 L8; M25B 4.0 L8	C	(Germany) Manfred von Brauchitsch	Ret	2	Ret	5	Ret	Ret	3
1935	W25A; W25B	M25A 3.4 L8; M25B 4.0 L8	C	(Germany) Hermann Lang				Ret	6	Ret	
1935	W25A; W25B	M25A 3.4 L8; M25B 4.0 L8	C	(Germany) Hanns Geier				7	DNS		
1936	W25K	ME25 4.7 L8	C		MON	GER	SUI	ITA			
1936	W25K	ME25 4.7 L8	C	(Germany) Rudolf Caracciola	1	Ret (Note: Caracciola took over Lang's car after his own retired. Lang then took over von Brauchitsch's car. Caracciola retired Lang's car and then took over Fagioli's car.)	**Ret**				
1936	W25K	ME25 4.7 L8	C	(Germany) Manfred von Brauchitsch	Ret	7	Ret				
1936	W25K	ME25 4.7 L8	C	(Germany) Hermann Lang		Ret	4 (Note: Fagioli took over Lang's car after his own retired.)				
1936	W25K	ME25 4.7 L8	C	(Italy) Luigi Fagioli	Ret	5	Ret				
1936	W25K	ME25 4.7 L8	C	(Monaco) Louis Chiron	**Ret**	Ret					
1937	W125	M125 5.6 L8	C		BEL	GER	MON	SUI	ITA		
1937	W125	M125 5.6 L8	C	(Germany) Rudolf Caracciola		1	**2**	**1**	**1**		
1937	W125	M125 5.6 L8	C	(Germany) Manfred von Brauchitsch	Ret	2	1	3	Ret		
1937	W125	M125 5.6 L8	C	(Germany) Hermann Lang	3	7	DNS	2	2		
1937	W125	M125 5.6 L8	C	(Switzerland) Christian Kautz	4	6	3	6	Ret		
1937	W125	M125 5.6 L8	C	(United Kingdom) Richard Seaman		Ret	DNS		4		
1937	W125	M125 5.6 L8	C	(Italy) Goffredo Zehender			5				
1938	W154	M154 3.0 V12	C		FRA	GER	SUI	ITA			
1938	W154	M154 3.0 V12	C	(Germany) Rudolf Caracciola	2	2 (Note: Lang's car developed a problem and was handed over to reserve driver Walter Bäumer. Caracciola fell ill and handed his car over to Lang.)	1	3 (Note: Caracciola was burnt by leaking exhaust and handed his car over to von Brauchitsch, who later handed it back after suffering the same problem.)			
1938	W154	M154 3.0 V12	C	(Germany) Manfred von Brauchitsch	1	**Ret**	3	Ret			
1938	W154	M154 3.0 V12	C	(Germany) Hermann Lang	**3**	Ret	10 (Note: Lang got glass in his eye after his goggles were smashed by a stone. His car was taken over by reserve driver Walter Bäumer.)	**Ret**			
1938	W154	M154 3.0 V12	C	(United Kingdom) Richard Seaman		1	**2**	Ret			
1938	W154	M154 3.0 V12	C	(Germany) Walter Bäumer		Ret	10				
1939	W154	M154 3.0 V12; M163 3.0 V12	C		BEL	FRA	GER	SUI			
1939	W154	M154 3.0 V12; M163 3.0 V12	C	(Germany) Hermann Lang	1	**Ret**	**Ret**	**1**			
1939	W154	M154 3.0 V12; M163 3.0 V12	C	(Germany) Rudolf Caracciola	Ret	Ret	1	2			
1939	W154	M154 3.0 V12; M163 3.0 V12	C	(Germany) Manfred von Brauchitsch	3	Ret	Ret	3			
1939	W154	M154 3.0 V12; M163 3.0 V12	C	(Germany) Hans Hartmann				6			
1939	W154	M154 3.0 V12; M163 3.0 V12	C	(United Kingdom) Richard Seaman	Ret						
1939	W154	M154 3.0 V12; M163 3.0 V12	C	(Germany) Heinz Brendel			Ret				

== Complete Formula One results ==
=== As a constructor ===
==== 1954–1955 ====
(key)

Year	Chassis	Engine	Tyres	Drivers	1	2	3	4	5	6	7	8	9	Points	WCC
1954	W196	M196 2.5 L8	C		ARG	500	BEL	FRA	GBR	GER	SUI	ITA	ESP	—N/a	—N/a
1954	W196	M196 2.5 L8	C	(Argentina) Juan Manuel Fangio				1^{P} (Note: Streamlined version used.)	4^{P}^{F}	1^{P}	1^{F}	1^{P}	3	—N/a	—N/a
1954	W196	M196 2.5 L8	C	(Germany) Karl Kling				2	7	4^{F}	Ret	Ret	5	—N/a	—N/a
1954	W196	M196 2.5 L8	C	(Germany) Hans Herrmann				Ret^{F}		Ret	3	4	Ret	—N/a	—N/a
1954	W196	M196 2.5 L8	C	(Germany) Hermann Lang						Ret				—N/a	—N/a
1955	W196	M196 2.5 L8	C		ARG	MON	500	BEL	NED	GBR	ITA			—N/a	—N/a
1955	W196	M196 2.5 L8	C	(Argentina) Juan Manuel Fangio	1^{F}	Ret^{P}^{F}		1^{F}	1^{P}	2	1^{P}			—N/a	—N/a
1955	W196	M196 2.5 L8	C	(Germany) Karl Kling	4 / Ret (Note: Shared drive.)			Ret	Ret	3	Ret			—N/a	—N/a
1955	W196	M196 2.5 L8	C	(Germany) Hans Herrmann	4	DNQ								—N/a	—N/a
1955	W196	M196 2.5 L8	C	(United Kingdom) Stirling Moss	4 / Ret	9		2	2	1^{P}^{F}	Ret^{F}			—N/a	—N/a
1955	W196	M196 2.5 L8	C	(France) André Simon		Ret								—N/a	—N/a
1955	W196	M196 2.5 L8	C	(Italy) Piero Taruffi						4	2			—N/a	—N/a
1956 – 2009: Mercedes-Benz did not compete as a constructor.

==== 2010s ====
(key)

Year	Chassis	Engine	Tyres	Drivers	1	2	3	4	5	6	7	8	9	10	11	12	13	14	15	16	17	18	19	20	21	Points	WCC
2010	MGP W01	FO 108X 2.4 V8	B		BHR	AUS	MAL	CHN	ESP	MON	TUR	CAN	EUR	GBR	GER	HUN	BEL	ITA	SIN	JPN	KOR	BRA	ABU			214	4th
2010	MGP W01	FO 108X 2.4 V8	B	(Germany) Nico Rosberg	5	5	3	3	13	7	5	6	10	3	8	Ret	6	5	5	17	Ret	6	4			214	4th
2010	MGP W01	FO 108X 2.4 V8	B	(Germany) Michael Schumacher	6	10	Ret	10	4	12	4	11	15	9	9	11	7	9	13	6	4	7	Ret			214	4th
2011	MGP W02	FO 108Y 2.4 V8	P		AUS	MAL	CHN	TUR	ESP	MON	CAN	EUR	GBR	GER	HUN	BEL	ITA	SIN	JPN	KOR	IND	ABU	BRA			165	4th
2011	MGP W02	FO 108Y 2.4 V8	P	(Germany) Nico Rosberg	Ret	12	5	5	7	11	11	7	6	7	9	6	Ret	7	10	8	6	6	7			165	4th
2011	MGP W02	FO 108Y 2.4 V8	P	(Germany) Michael Schumacher	Ret	9	8	12	6	Ret	4	17	9	8	Ret	5	5	Ret	6	Ret	5	7	15			165	4th
2012	F1 W03	FO 108Z 2.4 V8	P		AUS	MAL	CHN	BHR	ESP	MON	CAN	EUR	GBR	GER	HUN	BEL	ITA	SIN	JPN	KOR	IND	ABU	USA	BRA		142	5th
2012	F1 W03	FO 108Z 2.4 V8	P	(Germany) Nico Rosberg	12	13	1^{P}	5	7	2	6	6^{F}	15	10	10	11	7^{F}	5	Ret	Ret	11	Ret	13	15		142	5th
2012	F1 W03	FO 108Z 2.4 V8	P	(Germany) Michael Schumacher	Ret	10	Ret	10	Ret	Ret	Ret	3	7	7^{F}	Ret	7	6	Ret	11	13	22^{†}	11	16	7		142	5th
2013	F1 W04	FO 108F 2.4 V8	P		AUS	MAL	CHN	BHR	ESP	MON	CAN	GBR	GER	HUN	BEL	ITA	SIN	KOR	JPN	IND	ABU	USA	BRA			360	2nd
2013	F1 W04	FO 108F 2.4 V8	P	(United Kingdom) Lewis Hamilton	5	3	3^{P}	5	12	4	3	4^{P}	5^{P}	1^{P}	3^{P}	9^{F}	5	5	Ret	6	7	4	9			360	2nd
2013	F1 W04	FO 108F 2.4 V8	P	(Germany) Nico Rosberg	Ret	4	Ret	9^{P}	6^{P}	1^{P}	5	1	9	19^{†}	4	6	4	7	8	2	3	9	5			360	2nd
2014	F1 W05 Hybrid	PU106A Hybrid 1.6 V6 t	P		AUS	MAL	BHR	CHN	ESP	MON	CAN	AUT	GBR	GER	HUN	BEL	ITA	SIN	JPN	RUS	USA	BRA	ABU			701	1st
2014	F1 W05 Hybrid	PU106A Hybrid 1.6 V6 t	P	(United Kingdom) Lewis Hamilton	Ret^{P}	1^{P}^{F}	1	1^{P}	1^{P}	2	Ret	2	1^{F}	3^{F}	3	Ret	1^{P}^{F}	1^{P}^{F}	1^{F}	1^{P}	1	2^{F}	1			701	1st
2014	F1 W05 Hybrid	PU106A Hybrid 1.6 V6 t	P	(Germany) Nico Rosberg	1^{F}	2	2^{P}^{F}	2^{F}	2	1^{P}	2^{P}	1	Ret^{P}	1^{P}	4^{P}^{F}	2^{P}^{F}	2	Ret	2^{P}	2	2^{P}	1^{P}	14^{P}			701	1st
2015	F1 W06 Hybrid	PU106B Hybrid 1.6 V6 t	P		AUS	MAL	CHN	BHR	ESP	MON	CAN	AUT	GBR	HUN	BEL	ITA	SIN	JPN	RUS	USA	MEX	BRA	ABU			703	1st
2015	F1 W06 Hybrid	PU106B Hybrid 1.6 V6 t	P	(United Kingdom) Lewis Hamilton	1^{P}^{F}	2^{P}	1^{P}^{F}	1^{P}	2^{F}	3^{P}	1^{P}	2^{P}	1^{P}^{F}	6^{P}	1^{P}	1^{P}^{F}	Ret	1^{F}	1	1	2	2^{F}	2^{F}			703	1st
2015	F1 W06 Hybrid	PU106B Hybrid 1.6 V6 t	P	(Germany) Nico Rosberg	2	3^{F}	2	3	1^{P}	1	2	1^{F}	2	8	2^{F}	17^{†}	4	2^{P}	Ret^{P}	2^{P}^{F}	1^{P}^{F}	1^{P}	1^{P}			703	1st
2016	F1 W07 Hybrid	PU106C Hybrid 1.6 V6 t	P		AUS	BHR	CHN	RUS	ESP	MON	CAN	EUR	AUT	GBR	HUN	GER	BEL	ITA	SIN	MAL	JPN	USA	MEX	BRA	ABU	765	1st
2016	F1 W07 Hybrid	PU106C Hybrid 1.6 V6 t	P	(United Kingdom) Lewis Hamilton	2^{P}	3^{P}	7	2	Ret^{P}	1^{F}	1^{P}	5	1^{P}^{F}	1^{P}	1	1	3^{F}	2^{P}	3	Ret^{P}	3	1^{P}	1^{P}	1^{P}	1^{P}	765	1st
2016	F1 W07 Hybrid	PU106C Hybrid 1.6 V6 t	P	(Germany) Nico Rosberg	1	1^{F}	1^{P}	1^{P}^{F}	Ret	7	5^{F}	1^{P}^{F}	4	3^{F}	2^{P}	4^{P}	1^{P}	1	1^{P}	3^{F}	1^{P}	2	2	2	2	765	1st
2017	F1 W08 EQ Power+	M08 EQ Power+ 1.6 V6 t	P		AUS	CHN	BHR	RUS	ESP	MON	CAN	AZE	AUT	GBR	HUN	BEL	ITA	SIN	MAL	JPN	USA	MEX	BRA	ABU		668	1st
2017	F1 W08 EQ Power+	M08 EQ Power+ 1.6 V6 t	P	(Finland) Valtteri Bottas	3	6	3^{P}	1	Ret	4	2	2	1^{P}	2	3	5	2	3	5	4^{F}	5	2	2^{P}	1^{P}^{F}		668	1st
2017	F1 W08 EQ Power+	M08 EQ Power+ 1.6 V6 t	P	(United Kingdom) Lewis Hamilton	2^{P}	1^{P}^{F}	2^{F}	4	1^{P}^{F}	7	1^{P}^{F}	5^{P}	4^{F}	1^{P}^{F}	4	1^{P}	1^{P}	1^{F}	2^{P}	1^{P}	1^{P}	9	4	2		668	1st
2018	F1 W09 EQ Power+	M09 EQ Power+ 1.6 V6 t	P		AUS	BHR	CHN	AZE	ESP	MON	CAN	FRA	AUT	GBR	GER	HUN	BEL	ITA	SIN	RUS	JPN	USA	MEX	BRA	ABU	655	1st
2018	F1 W09 EQ Power+	M09 EQ Power+ 1.6 V6 t	P	(Finland) Valtteri Bottas	8	2^{F}	2	14^{F}^{†}	2	5	2	7^{F}	Ret^{P}	4	2	5	4^{F}	3	4	2^{P}^{F}	2	5	5^{F}	5^{F}	5	655	1st
2018	F1 W09 EQ Power+	M09 EQ Power+ 1.6 V6 t	P	(United Kingdom) Lewis Hamilton	2^{P}	3	4	1	1^{P}	3	5	1^{P}	Ret	2^{P}	1^{F}	1^{P}	2^{P}	1^{F}	1^{P}	1	1^{P}	3^{P}^{F}	4	1^{P}	1^{P}	655	1st
2019	F1 W10 EQ Power+	M10 EQ Power+ 1.6 V6 t	P		AUS	BHR	CHN	AZE	ESP	MON	CAN	FRA	AUT	GBR	GER	HUN	BEL	ITA	SIN	RUS	JPN	MEX	USA	BRA	ABU	739	1st
2019	F1 W10 EQ Power+	M10 EQ Power+ 1.6 V6 t	P	(Finland) Valtteri Bottas	1^{F}	2	2^{P}	1^{P}	2^{P}	3	4^{F}	2	3	2^{P}	Ret	8	3	2	5	2	1	3	1^{P}	Ret^{F}	4	739	1st
2019	F1 W10 EQ Power+	M10 EQ Power+ 1.6 V6 t	P	(United Kingdom) Lewis Hamilton	2^{P}	1	1	2	1^{F}	1^{P}	1	1^{P}	5	1^{F}	9^{P}	1	2	3^{F}	4	1^{F}	3^{F}	1	2	7	1^{P}^{F}	739	1st

==== 2020s ====
Key

Key
Colour	Result
Gold	Winner
Silver	Second place
Bronze	Third place
Green	Other points position
Blue	Other classified position
Blue	Not classified, finished (NC)
Purple	Not classified, retired (Ret)
Red	Did not qualify (DNQ)
Black	Disqualified (DSQ)
White	Did not start (DNS)
White	Race cancelled (C)
Blank	Did not practice (DNP)
Blank	Excluded (EX)
Blank	Did not arrive (DNA)
Blank	Withdrawn (WD)
Blank	Did not enter (empty cell)
Annotation	Meaning
P	Pole position
F	Fastest lap
Superscript number	Points-scoring position in sprint

Year	Chassis	Engine	Tyres	Drivers	1	2	3	4	5	6	7	8	9	10	11	12	13	14	15	16	17	18	19	20	21	22	23	24	Points	WCC
2020	F1 W11 EQ Performance	M11 EQ Performance 1.6 V6 t	P		AUT	STY	HUN	GBR	70A	ESP	BEL	ITA	TUS	RUS	EIF	POR	EMI	TUR	BHR	SKH	ABU								573	1st
2020	F1 W11 EQ Performance	M11 EQ Performance 1.6 V6 t	P	(Finland) Valtteri Bottas	1^{P}	2	3	11	3^{P}	3^{F}	2	5	2	1^{F}	Ret^{P}	2	2^{P}	14	8	8^{P}	2								573	1st
2020	F1 W11 EQ Performance	M11 EQ Performance 1.6 V6 t	P	(United Kingdom) Lewis Hamilton	4	1^{P}	1^{P}^{F}	1^{P}	2^{F}	1^{P}	1^{P}	7^{P}^{F}	1^{P}^{F}	3^{P}	1	1^{P}^{F}	1^{F}	1	1^{P}		3								573	1st
2020	F1 W11 EQ Performance	M11 EQ Performance 1.6 V6 t	P	(United Kingdom) George Russell																9^{F}									573	1st
2021	F1 W12 E Performance	M12 E Performance 1.6 V6 t	P		BHR	EMI	POR	ESP	MON	AZE	FRA	STY	AUT	GBR	HUN	BEL	NED	ITA	RUS	TUR	USA	MXC	SAP	QAT	SAU	ABU			613.5	1st
2021	F1 W12 E Performance	M12 E Performance 1.6 V6 t	P	(Finland) Valtteri Bottas	3^{F}	Ret	3^{P}^{F}	3	Ret	12	4	3	2	3^{3}	Ret	12	3	3^{1}	5	1^{P}^{F}	6	15^{P}^{F}	3^{1 P}	Ret	3	6			613.5	1st
2021	F1 W12 E Performance	M12 E Performance 1.6 V6 t	P	(United Kingdom) Lewis Hamilton	1	2^{P}^{F}	1	1^{P}	7^{F}	15	2	2^{F}	4	1^{2}	2^{P}	3^{‡}	2^{F}	Ret	1	5	2^{F}	2	1	1^{P}	1^{P}^{F}	2			613.5	1st
2022	F1 W13 E Performance	M13 E Performance 1.6 V6 t	P		BHR	SAU	AUS	EMI	MIA	ESP	MON	AZE	CAN	GBR	AUT	FRA	HUN	BEL	NED	ITA	SIN	JPN	USA	MXC	SAP	ABU			515	3rd
2022	F1 W13 E Performance	M13 E Performance 1.6 V6 t	P	(United Kingdom) Lewis Hamilton	3	10	4	13	6	5	8	4	3	3^{F}	3^{8}	2	2^{F}	Ret	4	5	9	5	2	2	2^{3}	18†			515	3rd
2022	F1 W13 E Performance	M13 E Performance 1.6 V6 t	P	(United Kingdom) George Russell	4	5	3	4	5	3	5	3	4	Ret	4^{4}	3	3^{P}	4	2	3	14^{F}	8	5^{F}	4^{F}	1^{1 F}	5			515	3rd
2023	F1 W14 E Performance	M14 E Performance 1.6 V6 t	P		BHR	SAU	AUS	AZE	MIA	MON	ESP	CAN	AUT	GBR	HUN	BEL	NED	ITA	SIN	JPN	QAT	USA	MXC	SAP	LVG	ABU			409	2nd
2023	F1 W14 E Performance	M14 E Performance 1.6 V6 t	P	(United Kingdom) Lewis Hamilton	5	5	2	6^{7}	6	4^{F}	2	3	8	3	4^{P}	4^{7 F}	6	6	3^{F}	5	Ret^{5}	DSQ^{2}	2^{F}	8^{7}	7	9			409	2nd
2023	F1 W14 E Performance	M14 E Performance 1.6 V6 t	P	(United Kingdom) George Russell	7	4	Ret	8^{4 F}	4	5	3	Ret	7^{8}	5	6	6^{8}	17	5	16†	7	4^{4}	5^{8}	6	Ret^{4}	8	3			409	2nd
2024	F1 W15 E Performance	M15 E Performance 1.6 V6 t	P		BHR	SAU	AUS	JPN	CHN	MIA	EMI	MON	CAN	ESP	AUT	GBR	HUN	BEL	NED	ITA	AZE	SIN	USA	MXC	SAP	LVG	QAT	ABU	468	4th
2024	F1 W15 E Performance	M15 E Performance 1.6 V6 t	P	(United Kingdom) Lewis Hamilton	7	9	Ret	9	9^{2}	6	6	7^{F}	4^{F}	3	4^{6}	1	3	1	8	5	9	6	Ret^{6}	4	10	2	12^{6}	4	468	4th
2024	F1 W15 E Performance	M15 E Performance 1.6 V6 t	P	(United Kingdom) George Russell	5	6	17†	7	6^{8}	8	7^{F}	5	3^{P}	4	1^{4}	Ret^{P}	8^{F}	DSQ	7	7	3	4	6^{5}	5	4^{6}	1^{P}	4^{3 P}	5	468	4th
2025	F1 W16 E Performance	M16 E Performance 1.6 V6 t	P		AUS	CHN	JPN	BHR	SAU	MIA	EMI	MON	ESP	CAN	AUT	GBR	BEL	HUN	NED	ITA	AZE	SIN	USA	MXC	SAP	LVG	QAT	ABU	469	2nd
2025	F1 W16 E Performance	M16 E Performance 1.6 V6 t	P	(Italy) Kimi Antonelli	4	6^{7}	6^{F}	11	6	6^{7}	Ret	18	Ret	3	Ret	Ret	16^{F}	10	16	9	4	5	13^{8 F}	6	2^{2}	3	5^{6}	15	469	2nd
2025	F1 W16 E Performance	M16 E Performance 1.6 V6 t	P	(United Kingdom) George Russell	3	3^{4}	5	2	5	3^{4}	7	11	4	1^{P}^{F}	5	10	5	3^{F}	4	5	2	1^{P}	6^{2}	7^{F}	4^{3}	2	6^{2}	5	469	2nd
2026	F1 W17 E Performance	1.6 V6 t	P		AUS	CHN	JPN	MIA	CAN	MON	BCN	AUT	GBR	BEL	HUN	NED	ITA	ESP	AZE	BHR	SIN	USA	MXC	SAP	LVG	QAT	ABU		652*	1st
2026	F1 W17 E Performance	1.6 V6 t	P	(Italy) Kimi Antonelli	2	1^{5 P F}	1^{P}^{F}	1^{6 P}	1^{3 F}	1^{P}^{F}	16†	3^{F}	15^{1 P F}	1^{P}	3	2^{4}	1^{F}	1	5	2	3^{4}	1^{P}	3	5^{F}					652*	1st
2026	F1 W17 E Performance	1.6 V6 t	P	(United Kingdom) George Russell	1^{P}	2^{1}	4	4^{4}	Ret^{1 P}	12	2^{P}	1^{P}	2^{4}	Ret	7	3^{1}	2	5^{F}	1^{P}^{F}	20†	9	8	6	4					652*	1st

Notes

- * – Season still in progress.
- ^{†} – The driver did not finish the Grand Prix, but was classified, as he completed over 90% of the race distance.
- ^{‡} – Half points awarded as less than 75% of the race distance was completed.

=== Results of other Mercedes cars ===
(key)

Year	Entrant	Chassis	Engine	Tyres	Driver	1	2	3	4	5	6	7	8
1957	Safety Auto Glass	Mercedes W154	Jaguar 3.4 L6	F		ARG	MON	500	FRA	GBR	GER	PES	ITA
1957	Safety Auto Glass	Mercedes W154	Jaguar 3.4 L6	F	(United States) Danny Kladis			DNQ					

=== Non-championship Formula One results ===
(key)

Year	Chassis	Engine	Driver	1	2	3	4	5	6	7	8	9	10	11	12	13	14	15	16	17	18	19	20	21	22	23
1954	W196	M196 2.5 L8		LAV	BOR	INT	BAR	CUR	ROM	FRO	COR	BRC	CRY	ROU	CAE	AUG	COR	OUL	RED	PES	SAC	JOE	CAD	BER	GOO	DTT
1954	W196	M196 2.5 L8	(Argentina) Juan Manuel Fangio																					2		
1954	W196	M196 2.5 L8	(Germany) Karl Kling																					1		
1954	W196	M196 2.5 L8	(Germany) Hans Herrmann																					3		
