= 1939 Eifelrennen =

1939 Eifelrennen Grand Prix

Race details
- Date: 21 May 1939
- Official name: XII Internationales Eifelrennen
- Location: Nürburgring; Nürburg, Germany
- Course: Permanent racing facility
- Course length: 22.810 km (14.173 miles)
- Distance: 10 laps, 228.1 km (141.7 miles)
- Weather: Sunny

Pole position
Driver	(Germany) Hermann Lang	Mercedes-Benz
- Time: 9:54.4

Fastest lap
Driver	(Germany) Hermann Lang	Mercedes-Benz
- Time: 9:52.2

Podium
First	(Germany) Hermann Lang	Mercedes-Benz
Second	(Italy) Tazio Nuvolari	Auto Union
Third	(Germany) Rudolf Caracciola	Mercedes-Benz

The 1939 Eifelrennen was a Grand Prix motor race held at the Nürburgring on 21 May 1939.

== Race ==
The event was the first race under the new 3-litre Grand Prix formula, and it was evident that Mercedes-Benz had produced a better car than its German rival from Auto Union, with Nuvolari's second place being put down to a combination of his brilliance and not needing to make a refuelling stop. The cars also proved to be quicker than their 5-litre predecessors. Richard Seaman and Manfred von Brauchitsch both had rocket starts and ran 1–2 as the field entered the Südkehre, but the torque proved too much for their clutches; Seaman retired at the end of the first lap and von Brauchitsch was bedevilled with clutch slip for most of the race. Lang soon took the lead and led most of the way, dropping to third only after his refuelling stop, re-taking the lead (having passed Nuvolari) when Caracciola made his stop in turn.

The race was the only Grande Epreuve appearance for Auto Union test driver/engineer/film-maker Ulli Bigalke, who beat H. P. Müller to seventh place after the latter suffered an engine problem, and for Heinz Dipper. Mercedes-Benz was also making a film over the weekend, with Auto Union's co-operation, and footage was taken during practice of a mock start. The event marked the last appearance for René Carrière, who decided to retire from the sport, having broken his leg in a practice crash.

== Classification ==
Pos	No	Driver	Team	Car	Laps	Time/Retired	Grid
1	16	(Germany) Hermann Lang	Daimler-Benz AG	Mercedes-Benz W154	10	1:40:57.1	1
2	2	(Italy) Tazio Nuvolari	Auto Union	Auto Union D	10	+11.2	2
3	12	(Germany) Rudolf Caracciola	Daimler-Benz AG	Mercedes-Benz W154	10	+31.3	3
4	14	(Germany) Manfred von Brauchitsch	Daimler-Benz AG	Mercedes-Benz W154	10	+1:56.0	5
5	4	(Germany) Rudolf Hasse	Auto Union	Auto Union D	10	+1:59.0	8
6	10	(Germany) Ulli Bigalke	Auto Union	Auto Union D	10	+3:55.0	7
7	6	(Germany) H. P. Müller	Auto Union	Auto Union D	7	+5:34.1	6
8	20	(Germany) Hans-Hugo Hartmann	Daimler-Benz AG	Mercedes-Benz W154	9		10
9	22	(Germany) Paul Pietsch	P. Pietsch	Maserati 6CM	9		9
10	26	(Germany) Leonhard Joa	Süddeutsche Renngemeinschaft	Maserati 4CM	9		12
11	28	(France) Philippe Etancelin	Automobiles Talbot-Darracq	Talbot MD	9		11
12	24	(Germany) Heinz Dipper	Süddeutsche Renngemeinschaft	Maserati 6CM	8		13
Ret	18	(United Kingdom) Richard Seaman	Daimler-Benz AG	Mercedes-Benz W154	1	Clutch	4
DNS	8	(Germany) Georg Meier	Auto Union	Auto Union D	–	Engine	(7)
DNS	30	(France) René Carrière	Automobiles Talbot-Darracq	Talbot MD	–	Crash in practice	(9)

Grand Prix Race
Previous race: -	1939 Grand Prix season Grandes Épreuves	Next race: 1939 Belgian Grand Prix
Previous race: 1937 Eifelrennen	Eifelrennen	Next race: 1950 Eifelrennen (for Formula 2)
