= 1939 Grand Prix season =

Seventh AIACR European Championship season

1939 AIACR European Championship

Seasons
- ← 1938 none →

1939 Grand Prix season

Seasons
- ← 1938 1940–1945 →

The 1939 Grand Prix season was the seventh AIACR European Championship season. The championship winner was never officially announced by the AIACR due to the outbreak of World War II less than two weeks after the final event in Switzerland. The Italian GP initially had been a fifth event, but it became clear well before the war that it would be cancelled due to construction work. At that time, it was also undecided which scoring system would be used, the old minimum points system that basically counted positions, or the French maximum points system similar to the modern one. Although Hermann Paul Müller would have won the championship on points according to the old system, the president of Nazi Germany's highest motorsports organisation declared Hermann Lang the champion. Lang was clearly the dominating driver in that season, which was acknowledged by the international press. In the first two of the four championship events, both Lang and Müller won once while the other failed to complete 75% of the distance. The German round saw Lang retiring early, and Müller finishing 2nd behind Caracciola. This left Müller in the lead in both scoring systems, as published in magazines, with the Swiss round deciding the outcome. Müller finished 4th behind three Mercedes, which gave him the lead in the old point system, while in front, Lang had beaten Caracciola for the lead in the maximum points system.

== Teams and drivers ==
The following teams and drivers competed in the 1939 AIACR European Championship.

Entrant	Constructor	Chassis	Engine	Driver	Rounds
(Germany) Auto Union AG	Auto Union	D C/D	Auto Union 3.0 V12 s	(Italy) Tazio Nuvolari	All
(Germany) Auto Union AG	Auto Union	D C/D	Auto Union 3.0 V12 s	(Germany) Rudolf Hasse	1, 3-4
(Germany) Auto Union AG	Auto Union	D C/D	Auto Union 3.0 V12 s	(Germany) Hermann Paul Müller	All
(Germany) Auto Union AG	Auto Union	D C/D	Auto Union 3.0 V12 s	(Germany) Georg Meier	1-3
(Germany) Auto Union AG	Auto Union	D C/D	Auto Union 3.0 V12 s	(Germany) Hans Stuck	2-4
(Italy) Giuseppe Farina	Alfa Romeo	Tipo 316	Alfa Romeo 3.0 V16 s	(Italy) Giuseppe Farina	1
(France) Raymond Sommer	Alfa Romeo	Tipo 308	Alfa Romeo 3.0 L8 s	(France) Raymond Sommer	1, 3
(France) Robert Mazaud	Delahaye	135CS	Delahaye 3.6 L6	(France) Robert Mazaud	1
(France) Louis Gérard	Delahaye	135CS	Delahaye 3.6 L6	(France) Louis Gérard	1
(Germany) Daimler-Benz AG	Mercedes-Benz	W154	Mercedes-Benz M163 3.0 V12 s	(Germany) Rudolf Caracciola	All
(Germany) Daimler-Benz AG	Mercedes-Benz	W154	Mercedes-Benz M163 3.0 V12 s	(Germany) Hermann Lang	All
(Germany) Daimler-Benz AG	Mercedes-Benz	W154	Mercedes-Benz M163 3.0 V12 s	(Germany) Manfred von Brauchitsch	All
(Germany) Daimler-Benz AG	Mercedes-Benz	W154	Mercedes-Benz M163 3.0 V12 s	(United Kingdom) Richard Seaman	1
(Germany) Daimler-Benz AG	Mercedes-Benz	W154	Mercedes-Benz M163 3.0 V12 s	(Germany) Heinz Brendel	3
(Germany) Daimler-Benz AG	Mercedes-Benz	W154	Mercedes-Benz M163 3.0 V12 s	(Germany) Hans Hartmann	4
(Switzerland) Adolfo Mandirola	Maserati	8CM	Maserati 3.0 L8 s	(Switzerland) Adolfo Mandirola	1, 3
(Switzerland) Christian Kautz	Alfa Romeo	Tipo 308	Alfa Romeo 3.0 L8 s	(France) Raymond Sommer	2
(Switzerland) Christian Kautz	Alfa Romeo	Tipo 308	Alfa Romeo 3.0 L8 s	(Italy) Luigi Chinetti	2
(Switzerland) Christian Kautz	Alfa Romeo	Tipo 308	Alfa Romeo 3.0 L8 s	(France) Yves Matra	2
(France) Écurie Lucy O'Reilly Schell (France) Écurie Bleue Delahaye	Delahaye	145; 135CS; 135S	Delahaye 4.5 V12; Delahaye 4.5 L6; Delahaye 3.6 L6	(France) René Dreyfus	2-3
(France) Écurie Lucy O'Reilly Schell (France) Écurie Bleue Delahaye	Delahaye	145; 135CS; 135S	Delahaye 4.5 V12; Delahaye 4.5 L6; Delahaye 3.6 L6	(France) "Raph"	2-3
(France) Écurie Lucy O'Reilly Schell (France) Écurie Bleue Delahaye	Delahaye	145; 135CS; 135S	Delahaye 4.5 V12; Delahaye 4.5 L6; Delahaye 3.6 L6	(France) Robert Mazaud	3-4
(France) Écurie Lucy O'Reilly Schell (France) Écurie Bleue Delahaye	Maserati	8CTF	Maserati 3.0 L8 s	(France) René Dreyfus	4
(France) Écurie Lucy O'Reilly Schell (France) Écurie Bleue Delahaye	Maserati	8CTF	Maserati 3.0 L8 s	(France) "Raph"	4
(France) Automobiles Talbot-Darracq	Talbot	MD; MC	Talbot 4.5 L6	(France) Philippe Étancelin	2
(France) Automobiles Talbot-Darracq	Talbot	MD; MC	Talbot 4.5 L6	(France) René Le Bègue	2
(France) Automobiles Talbot-Darracq	Talbot	MD; MC	Talbot 4.5 L6	(United Kingdom) Raymond Mays	2
(Italy) Officine Alfieri Maserati	Maserati	8CTF	Maserati 3.0 L8 s	(Italy) Luigi Villoresi	3
(Italy) Officine Alfieri Maserati	Maserati	8CTF	Maserati 3.0 L8 s	(Germany) Paul Pietsch	3
(Germany) Süddeutsche Renngemeinschaft	Maserati	4CM; 6CM	Maserati 1.5 L4 s	(Germany) Leonhard Joa	3-4
(Switzerland) Max Christen	Maserati	26B	Maserati 2.0 L8 s	(Switzerland) Max Christen	4
(United Kingdom) Kenneth Evans	Alfa Romeo	P3	Alfa Romeo 3.0 L8 s	(United Kingdom) Kenneth Evans	4
(Germany) Paul Pietsch	Maserati	6CM	Maserati 1.5 L4 s	(Germany) Paul Pietsch	4
(France) Marc Horvilleur	Maserati	4CM	Maserati 1.5 L4 s	(France) Marc Horvilleur	4
(United Kingdom) Robert Ansell	ERA	B	ERA 1.5 L6 s	(United Kingdom) Bob Ansell	4
(United Kingdom) Conn Pollock	ERA	A	ERA 1.5 L6 s	(United Kingdom) Conn Pollock	4
(United Kingdom) Johnny Wakefield	Maserati	4CL	Maserati 1.5 L4 s	(United Kingdom) Johnny Wakefield	4
(Italy) Guido Barbieri	Maserati	6CM	Maserati 1.5 L6 s	(Italy) Guido Barbieri	4
(Italy) Giovanni Rocco	Maserati	4CL	Maserati 1.5 L4 s	(Italy) Giovanni Rocco	4
(Italy) Alfa Corse	Alfa Romeo	158	Alfa Romeo 1.5 L8 s	(Italy) Giuseppe Farina	4
(Italy) Alfa Corse	Alfa Romeo	158	Alfa Romeo 1.5 L8 s	(Italy) Clemente Biondetti	4
(Switzerland) Baron de Graffenried	Maserati	6C 34	Maserati 3.0 L6 s	(Switzerland) Toulo de Graffenried	4

=== Power for 1939 ===
Manufacturer	Model	Engine	Power Output	Max. Speed (km/h)	Dry Weight (kg)

== Season review ==
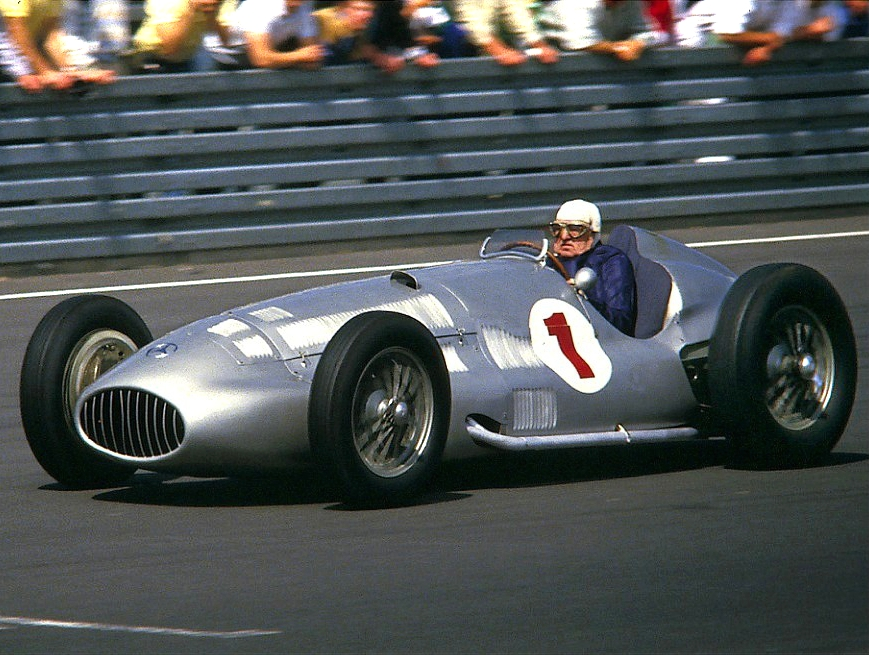
Mercedes-Benz competed with the W154.

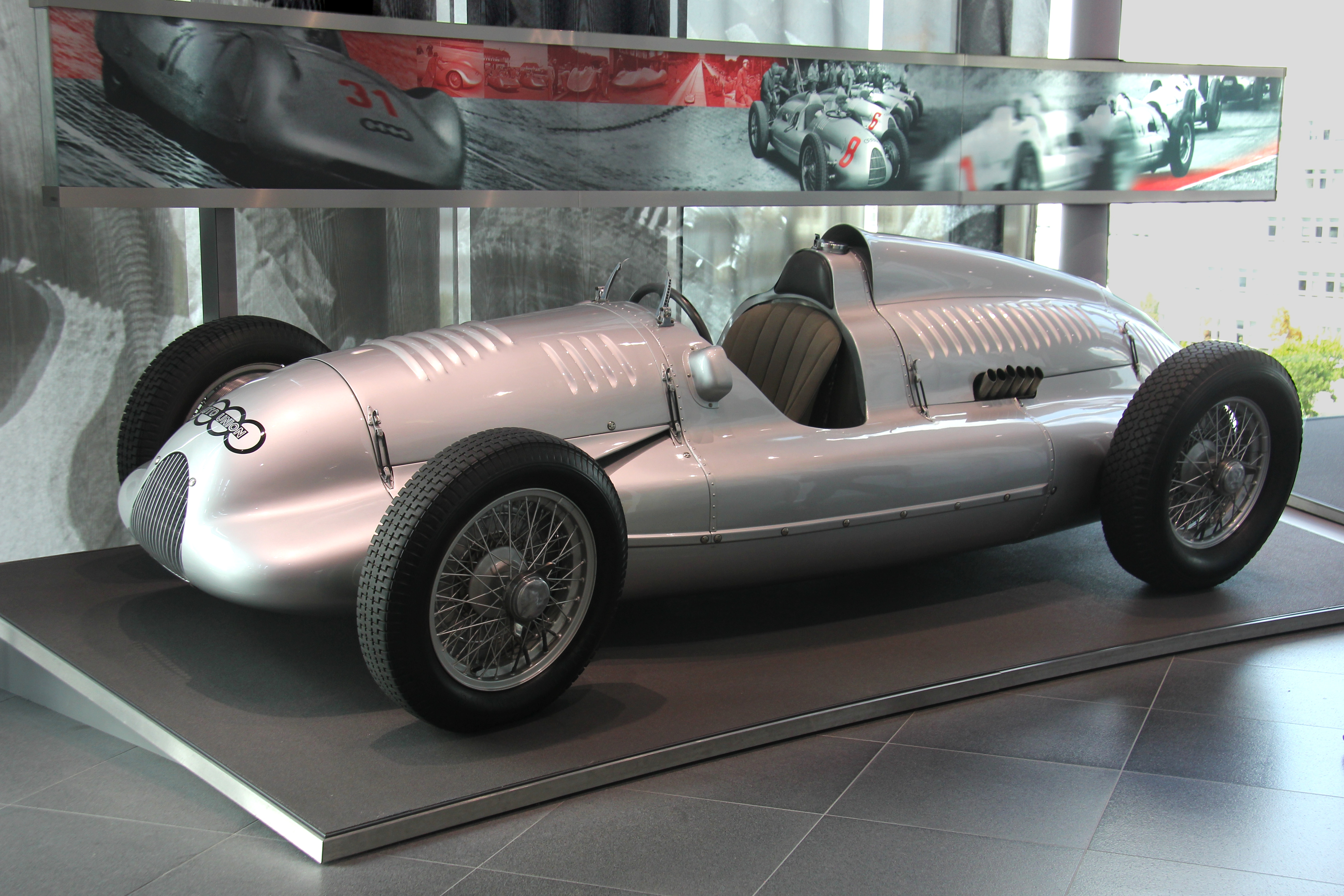
The Auto Union D Type.

=== European Championship Grands Prix ===
Rd	Date	Name	Circuit	Winning drivers	Winning constructor	Report
1	25 June	(Belgium) Belgian Grand Prix	Spa-Francorchamps	(Germany) Hermann Lang	Mercedes-Benz	Report
2	9 July	(France) French Grand Prix	Reims-Gueux	(Germany) Hermann Paul Müller	Auto Union	Report
3	23 July	(Germany) German Grand Prix	Nürburgring	(Germany) Rudolf Caracciola	Mercedes-Benz	Report
4	20 August	(Switzerland) Swiss Grand Prix	Bremgarten	(Germany) Hermann Lang	Mercedes-Benz	Report

=== Cancelled Races ===
Date	Name	Circuit
10 September	(Italy) Italian Grand Prix	Monza

=== Non-championship Grands Prix ===
Grandes Épreuves are denoted by a yellow background.

Date	Name	Circuit	Winning driver	Winning constructor	Report
2 April	(France) Pau Grand Prix	Pau	(Germany) Hermann Lang	Mercedes-Benz	Report
10 April	(United Kingdom) Road Championship	Brooklands	(United Kingdom) Arthur Dobson	ERA	Report
7 May	(France) Paris Cup	Montlhéry	(France) Jean-Pierre Wimille	Bugatti	Report
7 May	(Finland) Finnish Grand Prix	Eläintarharata	(Sweden) Adolf Westerblom	Alfa Romeo	Report
21 May	(Germany) Eifelrennen	Nürburgring	(Germany) Hermann Lang	Mercedes-Benz	Report
28 May	(Belgium) Grand Prix des Frontières	Chimay	(France) Maurice Trintignant	Bugatti	Report
25 June	(Romania) Bucharest Grand Prix	Bucharest	(Germany) Hans Stuck	Auto Union	Report
2 July	(France) Remparts Grand Prix	Angoulême	(France) Raymond Sommer	Alfa Romeo	Report
7 August	(United Kingdom) Campbell Trophy	Brooklands	(United Kingdom) Raymond Mays	ERA	Report
3 September	(Kingdom of Yugoslavia) Belgrade Grand Prix	Belgrade	(Italy) Tazio Nuvolari	Auto Union	Report
29 October	(Brazil) Gávea Nacional Circuit	Gávea	(Brazil) Manuel de Teffé	Maserati	Report

== Unofficial championship standings ==
Pos	Driver	BEL (Belgium)	FRA (France)	GER (Germany)	SUI (Switzerland)	Pts
1	(Germany) Hermann Paul Müller	Ret	1	2	4	12
2	(Germany) Hermann Lang	1	Ret	Ret	1	14
3	(Germany) Rudolf Caracciola	Ret	Ret	1	2	17
4	(Germany) Manfred von Brauchitsch	3	Ret	Ret	3	19
=	(Italy) Tazio Nuvolari	Ret	Ret	Ret	5	19
6	(Germany) Rudolf Hasse	2		Ret	Ret	20
=	(France) René Dreyfus		7	4	8	20
8	(Germany) Georg Meier	Ret	2	Ret		22
9	(France) Raymond Sommer	4	5	Ret		23
=	(Germany) Hans Stuck		6	Ret	10	23
11	(France) Robert Mazaud	5		6		24
=	(France) "Raph"		9	5		24
13	(Italy) Giuseppe Farina	Ret			7	25
14	(Germany) Paul Pietsch			3	Ret	26
15	(France) René Le Bègue		3			27
16	(France) Louis Gérard	6				28
=	(France) Philippe Étancelin		4			28
=	(Italy) Luigi Chinetti		8			28
=	(Germany) Leonhard Joa			7		28
=	(Germany) Hans Hartmann				6	28
=	(Italy) Clemente Biondetti				9	28
=	(United Kingdom) Kenneth Evans				11	28
=	(United Kingdom) John Wakefield				12	28
=	(United Kingdom) Robert Ansell				13	28
25	(United Kingdom) Richard Seaman	Ret				29
=	(Switzerland) Adolfo Mandirola	Ret		DSQ		29
=	(Switzerland) Toulo de Graffenried				Ret	29
28	(France) Yves Matra		Ret			30
=	(Italy) Luigi Villoresi			Ret		30
30	(United Kingdom) Raymond Mays		Ret			31
=	(Germany) Heinz Brendel			Ret		31
=	(Italy) Giovanni Rocco				Ret	31
Pos	Driver	BEL (Belgium)	FRA (France)	GER (Germany)	SUI (Switzerland)	Pts

Colour	Result	Points
Gold	Winner	1
Silver	2nd place	2
Bronze	3rd place	3
Green	Completed more than 75%	4
Blue	Completed between 50% and 75%	5
Purple	Completed between 25% and 50%	6
Red	Completed less than 25%	7
Black	Disqualified	8
Blank	Did not participate	8
