= Heinz Brendel =

German Grand Prix racing driver (1915–1989)

- Born: Heinz Brendel; 16 January 1915 Frankfurt-am-Main, Germany
- Died: 1 December 1989 (aged 74) Frankfurt-am-Main

Heinz Brendel (16 January 1915 - 1 December 1989) was a German Grand Prix racing driver.

== Career ==
The son of a racing driver, Brendel started racing in sportscars as a 17 year old, finishing 2nd in the 1100cc class at the Eifelrennen in 1935, At the end of the 1936 Grand Prix season, Brendel was invited by Mercedes-Benz to take part in an evaluation session, at the 14 mile long Nürburgring, as to his suitability for a Grand Prix drive. Despite a crash in a Mercedes-Benz W25, he was one of the 5 fastest to be invited to a follow-up test at the Monza circuit in March 1937, but he proved to be the slowest of the drivers tested there, and was not selected for a Grand Prix seat. He was however kept on as a reserve driver and took part in practice at the 1937 German Grand Prix.

Brendel's Grand Prix debut came at the 1939 German Grand Prix, at the Nürburgring; Brendel qualified a sensational 5th. After team-mate Hermann Lang retired from the lead, Mercedes-Benz manager Alfred Neubauer signalled Brendel to stop at the pits, and let Lang take over his car. Brendel missed the signal and, halfway around the following lap, was caught up in an accident when Paul Pietsch (Maserati) spun in front of him, and Brendel was forced to retire. Brendel rang the Mercedes-Benz pits from a trackside telephone and asked for transport back to the pits; an angry Neubauer told him to walk.

The race proved to be Brendel's only Grand Prix, but he took part in sportscar races after the Second World War and won the 1952 German sportscar championship (1,100cc class) in a Glöckler-Porsche. Brendel retired in 1953 after a serious accident.

== Results ==
=== Grands Prix ===
(key)

Year	Entrant	Chassis	Engine	1	2	3	4	5
1937	Daimler-Benz AG	Mercedes W125	Mercedes 5.7 L8	BEL –	GER reserve	MON –	SUI –	ITA –
1939	Daimler-Benz AG	Mercedes W154	Mercedes 3.0 V12	BEL –	FRA –	GER retired	SUI reserve	

== External sites ==
- Sports car results
