= Leonhard Joa =

German racing driver (1909–1981

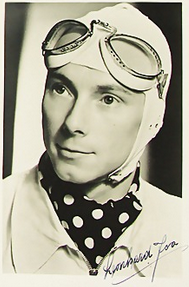
- Born: Leonhard Joa; 9 December 1909 Pirmasens, Germany
- Died: 1981 Carlsberg, Germany

Leonhard Joa (9 December 1909 – 1981) was a German racing driver, active before and after the Second World War.

== Career ==
Joa was from a wealthy family and competed as a privateer, in a run of Bugattis, including a T35 which he sold in 1937, an ex-Egon Brütsch T35B which he used until mid-1938, and a T51A, previously used by Rudolf Steinweg, which he bought in 1937. He won a handful of hillclimbs in 1937 and 1938, and turned to circuit racing. In 1939, he sold the Bugatti and formed the Süddeutsche Renngemeinschaft (South German Racing Team) with Heinz Dipper in order to take part in the 1939 Grand Prix season; Dipper ran a Maserati 6CM and Joa a 4CM, until the Swiss Grand Prix, for which Joa had a 6CM.

Joa's Grand Epreuve debut was at the 1939 Eifelrennen, in which he finished 10th, over a lap ahead of Dipper. He finished 7th (and last) at the 1939 German Grand Prix and did not qualify from the voiturette heat at the 1939 Swiss Grand Prix.

Joa returned to racing in 1947, taking part in a Formule Libre event at Hockenheim, part of the first race meeting in Germany after the war, in his 4CM. Joa finished second to Hans Stuck and gained a revenge by beating Stuck into second at the Eggberg hillclimb. The Maserati's engine blew at the Eggberg event the following year, and Joa never returned to the sport.

== Kegel ==
After his racing career ended, Joa became a successful practitioner of kegel (nine-pin bowling), winning the Rhineland-Palatinate championship in 1961, and the Class B German title in 1971. He died while taking part in the sport in his home town of Carlsberg in 1981.

== Grands Prix ==
(key)

Year	Entrant	Chassis	Engine	1	2	3	4
1939	Süddeutsche Renngemeinschaft	Maserati 4CM/6CM	Maserati	BEL –	FRA –	GER; 7	SUI; DNQ
