= AIACR European Championship =

Motor sport championship

European Championship
- Category: Single-seaters
- Country: Europe
- Inaugural season: 1931
- Folded: 1939
- Drivers: 32 (1939)
- Teams: 8 (1939)
- Constructors: 7 (1939)
- Last Drivers' champion: (Germany) Rudolf Caracciola (1938)

The European Drivers' Championship was an annual competition in auto racing that existed prior to the establishment of the Formula One world championship in 1950. It was established in 1931 and ran until the end of 1939 with a hiatus from 1933–34, and awarded points to drivers based on the results of selected Grand Prix races, the so-called Grandes Épreuves (this term had been used for the most prestigious races since the 1920s; the only Grande Épreuve to be excluded from the championship was the 1931 German Grand Prix). The championship was discontinued because of the outbreak of World War II in 1939, and no champion was officially declared for the last season.

The championship was run by the Association Internationale des Automobile Clubs Reconnus (AIACR), the forerunner to the FIA who are today's world governing body of motorsport.

== History ==
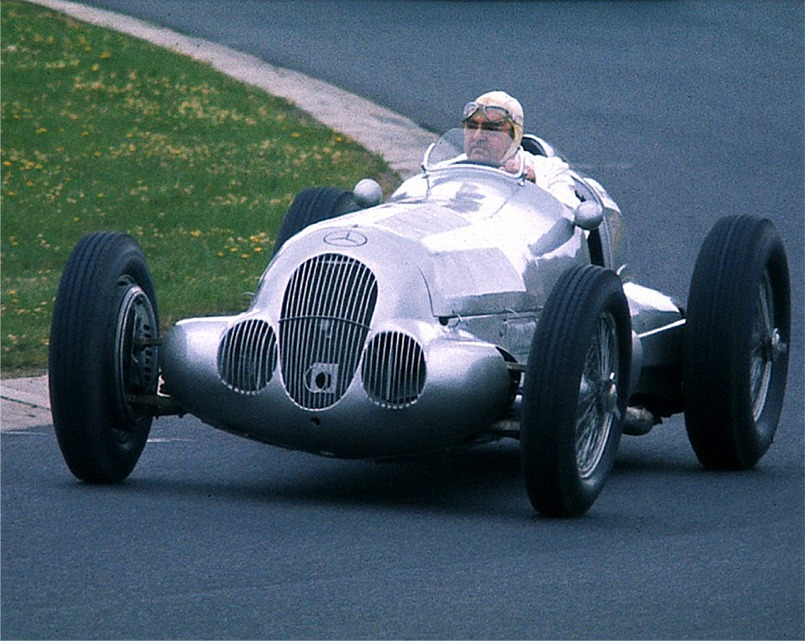
Hermann Lang demonstrating a Mercedes-Benz W125 at the Nürburgring in 1977. Lang drove a W125 to victory on its 1937 début.

The 1931 and 1932 seasons were run to existing Formula Libre regulations, with a minimum car weight of 900 kg. The calendar consisted of the Italian Grand Prix, the French Grand Prix and the Belgian Grand Prix/German Grand Prix.

In 1934, the AIACR introduced a maximum weight limit of 750 kg for Grand Prix cars. Already in 1933, new chancellor Adolf Hitler had announced that he would provide 450,000 reichsmarks to German companies to build Grand Prix cars. Eventually, the money was split between bidders, Mercedes-Benz and the newly formed Auto Union. Auto Union took over the P-Wagen concept of Ferdinand Porsche and put the engine behind the driver. Both German manufacturers proved dominant in nearly all races they entered. These cars proved to be the bases for the two companies entries in the first year of the European Championship. Other entries came from manufacturers including Alfa Romeo, whose team were being run by Scuderia Ferrari, Maserati, and Bugatti.

The 750 kg formula lasted until the end of 1937. By then, the German cars had over 600 hp, more than twice the rule makers had expected to be possible with that weight limit. For 1938, a new formula was introduced, limiting also engine sizes. Cars with a supercharger were permitted to have an engine size between 666 cc and 3000 cc, whereas normally aspirated cars were allowed between 1000 cc and 4500 cc. The cars had to weigh between 400 kg and 850 kg; the exact minimum weight specified in the regulations was dependent on a car's engine capacity and followed a linear scale.

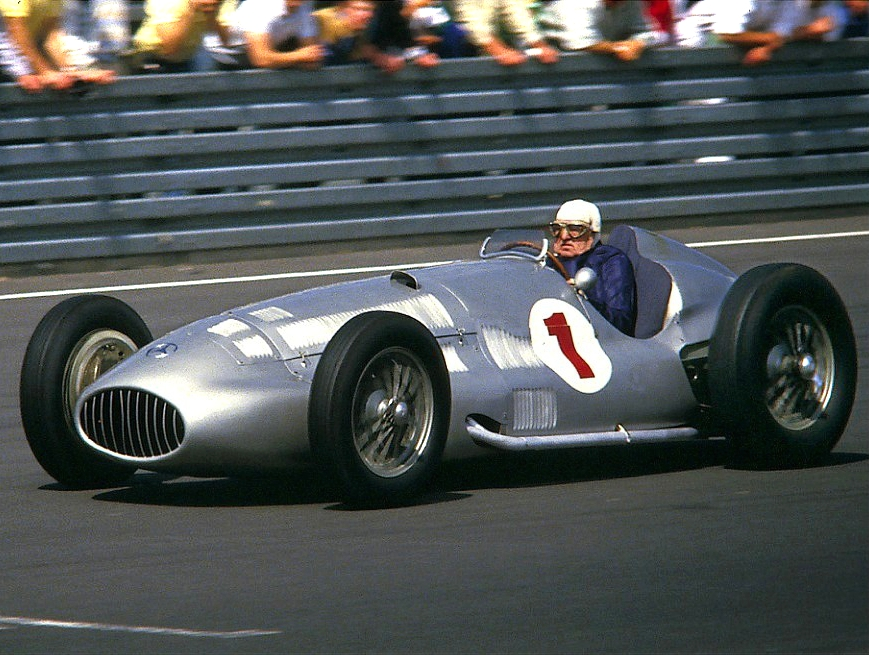
Hermann Lang, despite finishing second on points in 1939 in the Mercedes-Benz W154 (shown here in 1986), was declared champion by the Nazis.

At the AIACR's end of season meeting towards the end of 1938, it was expressed that some were not content using the then current points system. Belgium's representative, Mr. Langlois, was asked to come up with an alternative system for 1939. Langlois took several months to propose a new system and there is no evidence to suggest that the previous scoring system was rescinded.

In 1939, war broke out and the AIACR could not meet to publish an official set of championship results. Hermann Lang was declared European champion by Korpsführer Adolf Hühnlein of the NSKK, who was also president of Germany's highest racing organisation, Oberste Nationale Sportbehörde für die Deutsche Kraftfahrt. Hühnlein's declaration was published as a statement in the Völkischer Beobachter, the official Nazi Party newsletter. Hühnlein suggested that Lang had finished the season on 23 points, but this conflicts with the official scoring system, under which Hermann Paul Müller would have been the champion.

== Results ==
=== Scoring system ===
The AIACR European Championship treated the season like one race with several heats, putting emphasis on the championship challengers participating in all events and finishing the races. Thus, Championship race organisers should receive many entrants, and Championship race spectators should see many challengers racing till the end rather than staying absent or retiring early.

The scoring system was rather simple: the fewer points, the better. A win earned 1 point, the other podium places 2 and 3 points, and other participants earned 4 to 7 points based on the percentage of the race distance they completed. The worst cases, non-participation in a Championship event or disqualification, earned a driver the maximum of 8 points.

The points awarded on the completed percentage of the race distance were as follows.

% completed	Points
>75%	4
50–75%	5
25–50%	6
<25%	7

Not entering, or failing to start the race, earned the driver eight points. Drivers only scored points with the car they entered the race with. In 1931, co-drivers were eligible to score championship points, but only from the car they were assigned to at the start, and provided that they had completed a stint in the car during the race. From 1932 onwards, if a driver handed his car over to another driver mid-race, only the original driver would score points from the car's final position.

=== Championship history ===
Season	Champion Driver	Team	Poles	Wins	Podiums	Fastest laps	Points	Margin (pnts)	Championship Grands Prix						
1931	(Italy) Ferdinando Minoia	Alfa Romeo	0	0	2	0	9	0	(Italy); ITA	(France); FRA	(Belgium); BEL				
1932	(Italy) Tazio Nuvolari	Alfa Romeo	0	2	3	2	4	4	(Italy); ITA	(France); FRA	(Germany); GER				
1933–1934	Not held														
1935	(Germany) Rudolf Caracciola	Mercedes-Benz	0	4	5	1	11	6	(Monaco); MON	(France); FRA	(Belgium); BEL	(Germany); GER	(Switzerland); SUI	(Italy); ITA	(Spain); ESP
1936	(Germany) Bernd Rosemeyer	Auto Union	1	3	3	3	10	5	(Monaco); MON	(Germany); GER	(Switzerland); SUI	(Italy); ITA			
1937	(Germany) Rudolf Caracciola	Mercedes-Benz	3	3	4	2	13	2	(Belgium); BEL	(Germany); GER	(Monaco); MON	(Switzerland); SUI	(Italy); ITA		
1938	(Germany) Rudolf Caracciola	Mercedes-Benz	0	1	4	0	8	7	(France); FRA	(Germany); GER	(Switzerland); SUI	(Italy); ITA			
1939	Title not awarded due to the start of World War II (German Hermann Paul Müller who drove for Auto Union won the title unofficially)								(Belgium); BEL	(France); FRA	(Germany); GER	(Switzerland); SUI			

== See also ==
- Grand Prix motor racing
- List of AIACR European Championship winners
