= René Carrière =

French racing driver (1911–1982)

- Born: René Auguste Joseph Carrière; 10 March 1911 Marseilles, France
- Died: 22 March 1982 (aged 71) Marseilles

René Carrière (10 March 1911 – 22 March 1982) was a Grand Prix and sportscar racing driver.

== Career ==
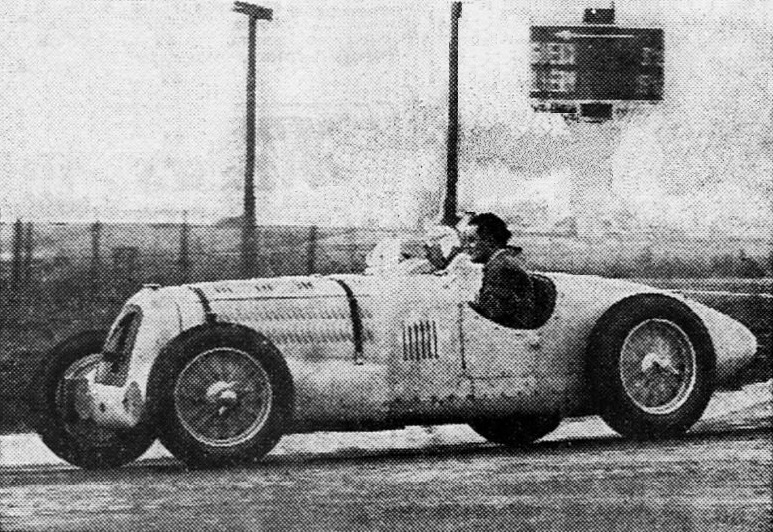
At the 1938 French Grand Prix, leaving room on the inside to be lapped

Carrière first came to attention in rallying, winning the Group 3 (1.5–2 litre capacity) class of the 1933 Coupe Internationale des Alpes in an Alfa Romeo, without suffering a single loss of marks; one of only two drivers to do so. His other rally successes included repeating his (joint) win at the Coupe Internationale des Alpes in 1934, this time in a Bugatti, and winning the 1934 Coupe des Glaciers in a Hotchkiss and 1935 Rallye d'Auvergne in a Ford. He twice finished 6th in the Monte Carlo Rally, in 1936 and 1938, both times in a Matford.

He consolidated his reputation with appearances at the 24 Hours of Le Mans, in which he drove from 1934 to 1938 with a best result of 7th in 1935, and 3rd in class, sharing a Riley Nine with Jean Trévoux.

Carrière's circuit career focussed on sportscar racing, driving in Delahaye 135CS models entered by Ecurie Bleue in 1936 and 1937. Highlights included 3rd at the 1936 24 Hours of Spa and 1937 Mille Miglia, both times with Laury Schell as co-driver. The duo also ran second at the 1937 24 Hours of Le Mans with six hours to go before a burst radiator pipe caused their Delahaye to retire; Carrière's results through the season earned him 7th place in the French drivers' championship. Carrière's most prestigious outright win for the team was at the Mont Ventoux hillclimb in 1936.

He made his Grand Prix debut at the 1936 Donington Grand Prix, sharing a Delahaye with British agent Alan Selborne; the duo were flagged off 8th. In 1938 he left for the Talbot equipe, with whom he made his one other national Grand Prix start, which was also only appearance in the AIACR European Championship, at the 1938 French Grand Prix. He finished 4th in a Talbot T150C, beaten only by three of the dominant Silver Arrows - but he was also the last finisher in a sparsely-entered race, only completing 54 of the scheduled 64 laps. It was his third consecutive 4th-place finish in the French Grand Prix, the previous two events having been degraded to local sportscar races. That season he also ran second at Le Mans, with René le Bègue as co-driver, before retiring at half-distance.

A crash at the 1939 Pau Grand Prix, and a more serious one in practice for the 1939 Eifelrennen (in which he broke his leg), persuaded Carrière to retire from the sport.

== Racing record ==
=== AIACR European Championship ===
(key) (Races in bold indicate pole position) (Races in italics indicate fastest lap)

Year	Entrant	Chassis	Engine	1	2	3	4	EDC	Pts
1938	Talbot Darracq	Talbot T150C	Talbot 2,996c 6 cyl	FRA; 4	GER –	SUI –	ITA –	14th=	28

=== Le Mans 24 Hours ===
Year	Team	Co-Drivers	Car	Class	Laps	Pos.	Class Pos.
1934	(France) Jean Trévoux	(France) Jean Trévoux	Riley Ulster Imp	1.1	174	12th	4th
1935	(France) Jean Trévoux	(France) Jean Trévoux	Riley Nine	1.5	204	7th	**3rd**
1937	(France) Ecurie Bleue	(United States) Laury Schell	Delahaye 135CS	5.0	193	ret	ret
1938	(Italy) Luigi Chinetti	(France) René Le Bègue	Talbot T150C	5.0	101	ret	ret

=== Sports car results ===
- Sports car results
