= Paul Pietsch =

German racing driver (1911–2012)

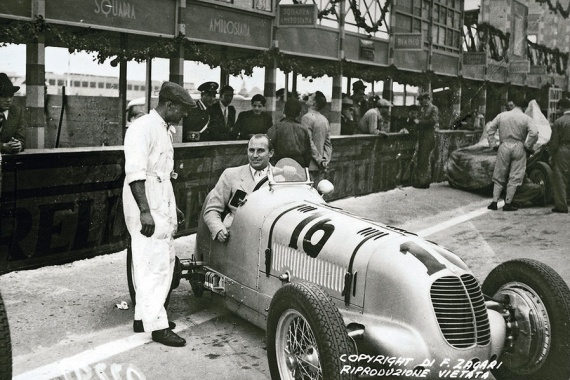
- Pietsch at 1938 Targa Florio in a Maserati 4CM
- Born: 20 June 1911; Freiburg im Breisgau, German Empire
- Died: 31 May 2012 (aged 100); Titisee-Neustadt, Germany

Formula One World Championship career
- Nationality: (Germany) German
- Active years: 1950–1952
- Team(s): Alfa Romeo, non-works Maserati and Veritas
- Entries: 3
- First entry: 1950 Italian Grand Prix
- Last entry: 1952 German Grand Prix

Paul Pietsch (20 June 1911 – 31 May 2012) was a racing driver, journalist and publisher from Germany, who founded the magazine Das Auto and published many other as his Motor Presse Stuttgart became the largest publisher in the European market for technology and special interest magazines.

He had a career in 1930s Grand Prix racing, and returned after the war, becoming the first German ever to take part in Formula One World Championship Grand Prix.

== Biography ==
Born in Freiburg, Pietsch began his racing career in 1932 with a private Bugatti and Alfa Romeo.

Racing with an Alfa Romeo, Pietsch won the 1933 III Svenska Isloppet GP ice race in Hemfjärden, and the 1934 I Vallentunaloppet ice race in Vellentunasjön, both in Sweden.

From the 1935 German Grand Prix he raced three GPs for Auto Union, and finished third in the 1935 Italian Grand Prix before leaving the team with its hard-to-drive rear engines. From 1937 onwards he entered a private Maserati. His greatest hours came in the 1939 German Grand Prix which he led from lap two until the ignition failed, making him drop down to third, which was still an excellent result for a privateer against the dominant force of the Silver Arrows.

After the war, Pietsch participated in three World Championship Grands Prix, debuting on September 3, 1950. His drive in a factory Alfa Romeo in the 1951 German Grand Prix ended with an accident. He scored no championship points.

At that time, Pietsch was already a successful editor and publisher of motorcycle and automobile magazines. His company, Motor Presse Stuttgart, is the largest in the European market for technology and special interest magazines.

From the death of his countryman Karl Kling in 2003 until his own death, Pietsch was the oldest surviving Formula One driver, at age 100 and the last surviving driver of pre-war Grand Prix era. His son Peter-Paul Pietsch races often at the Nürburgring with fellow journalists.

On 31 May 2012, Pietsch died from pneumonia at the age of 100 years, 11 months and 11 days. Pietsch was also the first Grand Prix driver to reach the age of 100.

== Racing record ==
=== Complete European Championship results ===
(key) (Races in bold indicate pole position) (Races in italics indicate fastest lap)

Year	Entrant	Chassis	Engine	1	2	3	4	5	6	7	EDC	Pts
1932	Pilesi Racing Team	Bugatti T35B	Bugatti 2.3 L8	ITA	FRA	GER; Ret					22nd	23
1935	Auto Union AG	Auto Union B	Auto Union 5.0 V16	MON	FRA	BEL	GER; 9	SUI; 11^{1}	ITA; 3	ESP; DNS	15th	47
1937	P. Pietsch	Maserati 6C-34	Maserati 3.7 L6	BEL	GER; Ret	MON; DNS	SUI; 10	ITA			17th	35
1938	P. Pietsch	Maserati 6CM	Maserati 1.5 L6	FRA	GER; 6	SUI	ITA				14th	28
1939	Officine A. Maserati	Maserati 8CTF	Maserati 3.0 L8	BEL	FRA	GER; 3					14th	26
1939	P. Pietsch	Maserati 4CL	Maserati 1.5 L4				SUI; Ret				14th	26

Notes

- **^1** – As a co-driver Pietsch was ineligible for championship points

=== Complete Formula One World Championship results ===
(key)

Year	Entrant	Chassis	Engine	1	2	3	4	5	6	7	8	WDC	Pts
1950	Paul Pietsch	Maserati 4CLT/48	Maserati 4CLT 1.5 L4s	GBR	MON	500	SUI	BEL	FRA	ITA; Ret		NC	0
1951	Alfa Romeo SpA	Alfa Romeo 159	Alfa Romeo 158 1.5 L8s	SUI	500	BEL	FRA	GBR	GER; Ret	ITA	ESP	NC	0
1952	Motor Presse Verlag	Veritas Meteor	Veritas 2.0 L6	SUI	500	BEL	FRA	GBR	GER; Ret	NED	ITA	NC	0

== See also ==
- List of centenarians (sportspeople)
