= 1947 Grand Prix du Comminges =

Race details
- Date: 10 August 1947
- Official name: XIII Grand Prix du Comminges
- Location: Saint-Gaudens, Haute-Garonne
- Course: Temporary street circuit
- Course length: 10.998 km (6.834 mi)
- Distance: 30 laps, 329.925 km (205.006 mi)

Pole position
Driver	(Italy) Luigi Villoresi	Maserati
- Time: not available

Fastest lap
Driver	(Italy) Dorino Serafini	Maserati
- Time: 4:15.5

Podium
First	(Monaco) Louis Chiron	Talbot-Lago
Second	(France) Yves Giraud-Cabantous	Talbot-Lago
Third	(France) Eugène Chaboud	Talbot-Lago

The 13th Grand Prix du Comminges was a non-championship Formula One motor race held in Saint-Gaudens on 10 August 1947. The race was held over 30 laps and was won by Louis Chiron in a Talbot-Lago. Yves Giraud-Cabantous and Eugène Chaboud were second and third, also in Talbot-Lagos. After more than two and a half hours racing, only 0.5 seconds separated Chiron and Yves-Cabantous. Maserati drivers Luigi Villoresi and Dorino Serafini respectively started from pole position and set fastest lap but both retired in separate accidents.

== Classification ==
Pos	No	Driver	Entrant	Manufacturer	Time/Retired
1	72	(Monaco) Louis Chiron	Ecurie France	Talbot-Lago	2:35:37.4, 126.72 kph
2	70	(France) Yves Giraud-Cabantous	Ecurie France	Talbot-Lago T150C	+0.5s
3	28	(France) Eugène Chaboud	Eugène Chaboud	Talbot-Lago	+1:45.7
4	52	(France) Roger Loyer	Roger Loyer	Cisitalia D46-Fiat	+3:39.5
5	66	(Switzerland) Emmanuel de Graffenried	Baron Emmanuel de Graffenried	Maserati 4CL	+3:39.6
6	80	(France) Maurice Trintignant (France) Jean Brault	Maurice Trintignant	Delahaye 135S	+1 lap
7	24	(Italy) Alberto Ascari	Scuderia Ambrosiana	Maserati 4CL	+1 lap
8	32	(France) Edmond Mouche	Edmond Mouche	Talbot-Lago 150C	+1 lap
9	34	(France) Charles de Cortanze	Emil Darl'mat	Darl'mat-Peugeot	+2 laps
10	68	(France) Gaston Serraud	Eugène Chaboud	Delahaye 135S	+2 laps
11	44	(France) Maurice Varet (France) Henri Louveau	Henri Louveau	Delage 3L	+2 laps
12	48	(United States) Harry Schell	Ecurie Laury Schell	Cisitalia D46-Fiat	+3 laps
13	74	(France) André Chardonnet	Equipe Chardonnet	BMW 328	+3 laps
14	56	(France) Robert Manzon	Robert Manzon	Cisitalia D46-Fiat	+4 laps
15	40	(France) Pierre Meyrat	Pierre Meyrat	Delahaye 135S	+5 laps
16	50	(France) Raymond de Saugé	R de Saugé	Cisitalia D46-Fiat	+5 laps
17	26	(Switzerland) Fred Meyer	Fred Meyer	Maserati 4CL	+5 laps
Ret	2	(France) Louis Rosier	Ecurie Tricolore	Talbot-Lago 150SS	21 laps, fuel pump
Ret	6	(France) Pierre Levegh	Ecurie Naphtra Course	Maserati 4CL	16 laps, accident
Ret	4	(France) "Raph"	Ecurie Naphtra Course	Maserati 4CL	16 laps
Ret	22	(Italy) Luigi Villoresi	Scuderia Ambrosiana	Maserati 4CL	16 laps, accident
Ret	54	(France) "Robert"	"Robert"	Cisitalia D46-Fiat	14 laps, accident
Ret	30	(France) Charles Pozzi	Charles Pozzi	Delahaye 135S	10 laps, con-rod
Ret	38	(France) Pierre Larrue	Pierre Larrue	Delahaye 135S	10 laps, accident/fire
Ret	14	(United Kingdom) Fred Ashmore	Reg Parnell	ERA A-Type	10 laps, accident
Ret	78	(France) Eugène Martin	Eugène Martin	BMW 328	10 laps, accident
Ret	46	(Italy) Dorino Serafini	Scuderia Milano	Maserati 4CL	7 laps, accident
Ret	8	(France) Charles Huc	Charles Huc	Bugatti Type 51A	7 laps
Ret	20	(Switzerland) Adolfo Mandirola	Adolfo Mandirola	Maserati 4CL	5 laps
Ret	60	(France) André Boyer	André Boyer	Cisitalia D46-Fiat	4 laps, accident
Ret	82	(Switzerland) Antonio Branca	Antonio Branca	Maserati 4CL	3 laps
Ret	84	(Switzerland) Rolf Kessler	Rolf Kessler	Bugatti Type 35	2 laps
Ret	16	(France) Henri Louveau	Henri Louveau	Maserati 4CL	0 laps
Ret	12	(United Kingdom) Joe Ashmore	Reg Parnell	Maserati 4CL	0 laps, accident
DNS	62	(France) Jean-Pierre Wimille	Equipe Gordini	Simca Gordini Type 15	

Grand Prix Race
1947 Grand Prix season
Previous race: 1939 Grand Prix du Comminges	Grand Prix du Comminges	Next race: 1948 Grand Prix du Comminges
