= Hans-Hugo Hartmann =

German racing driver (1916–1991)

- Born: Hans-Hugo Hartmann; 8 February 1916 Dortmund. Germany
- Died: February 1991

Hans-Hugo Hartmann (8 February 1916 - February 1991) was a German Grand Prix racing driver active in the 1930s and 1950s.

== Career ==
The son of the head of the Mercedes-Benz sales division, Hartmann - whose background was in rallying - was chosen as the marque's reserve Grand Prix driver in 1939, and took part in two Grandes Epreuves that season in a Mercedes-Benz W154; he finished 8th at the Eifelrennen at the Nürburgring and 6th at the Swiss Grand Prix, having started the latter from 5th on the grid.

Hartmann raced Borgward sportscars after the Second World War, including racing at the 1953 24 Hours of Le Mans with Adolf Brudes in a Hansa 1500 (retiring after a fuel tank split ran the car out of fuel on the Mulsanne Straight), until a serious crash in 1954, which saw him step back from racing. He made a return at the 1960 Monte Carlo Rally, again in a Borgward, finishing 54th overall.

== Grands Prix ==
(key)

Year	Entrant	Chassis	Engine	1	2	3	4
1939	Daimler-Benz AG	Mercedes W154	Mercedes 3.0 V12	BEL –	FRA –	GER –	SUI; 6th

== External sites ==
- Sports car results
