= Monaci (racing car) =

Italian racing car from the 1950s

Overview
- Production: 1952
- Model years: 1952
- Assembly: Naples, Italy
- Designer: Ugo Zagato

Body and chassis
- Class: Formula 2
- Layout: Front-engine, rear-wheel drive

Powertrain
- Engine: 2 x 1,100 cc (67 cu in) Fiat

The Monaci was a one-off Italian racing car, unusual in having twin engines, and which was eligible for the Formula 2 category in 1952.

== History ==
The car, dubbed the Monaco 8C Bimotore, was built by Ciro Monaci, showcasing an engine layout of his own design, of twin Fiat Topolino engines lying nose to tail and joined by a coupling he had developed. The car had bodywork by Zagato.

After Giuseppe Ruggero had some success in minor local races, Ciro Monaci entered the car in two international Formula 2 races; the Naples Grand Prix and Monza Grand Prix, in 1952 with Giovanni Rocco at the wheel. Rocco retired in both races, albeit after impressing with cornering speed. Rocco used the car, adapted with cycle-wings and lights, at the 1952 Bari Grand Prix for sportscars.
