= Grand Prix du Comminges =

The Grand Prix du Comminges was an automobile race held in France.

The race was named after the Comminges, one of the former Provinces of France in ancient Gascony in what is now the Haute-Garonne department of the Midi-Pyrénées region of France. The race began as part of a week-long festival organized by local officials in the town of Saint-Gaudens designed to attract tourists.

Grand Prix motor racing was at its zenith when the first race was first held in 1925 on a 27 km (17 mi) course from Saint-Gaudens to the town of Montréjeau and back again via a different route. The hilly terrain allowed for excellent viewing close to the beginning and end of the race from atop a hill at the outskirts of Saint-Gaudens. The course layout was modified a few times beginning with changes made to accommodate holding the official French Grand Prix in 1928.

At the 1932 race René Dreyfus was leading in his Bugatti going into the final lap. Rain fell and on the wet road he spun out on a sharp curve. Dreyfus was thrown from the vehicle as it somersaulted through the air but suffered only minor injuries. However, his car hurtled directly towards a large group of spectators gathered off to the side of the road but hit a small tree and smashed to the ground without injuring anyone.

Due to a controversy over vehicle regulations, both the 1937 and 1938 races had to be cancelled when major factory teams boycotted the event. After World War II, the creation of Formula One saw the Grand Prix du Comminges modified to a Formula Two event but, with the top drivers no longer competing, economics dictated cancellation after the 1952 race.

== Winners ==
- 1925 – (France) M Goury (Bignan B)
- 1926 – (Monaco) Louis Chiron (Bugatti T35)
- 1927 – (France) François Eysermann (Bugatti T37)
- 1928 – (United Kingdom) William Grover-Williams (Bugatti T35C)
- 1929 – (France) Philippe Étancelin (Bugatti T35C)
- 1930 – (France) François Miquel (Bugatti T37A)
- 1931 – (France) Philippe Étancelin (Alfa Romeo 8C 2300 'Monza')
- 1932 – (Italy) Goffredo Zehender (Alfa Romeo 8C 2300 'Monza')
- 1933 – (Italy) Luigi Fagioli (Alfa Romeo Tipo-B 'P3')
- 1934 – (Italy) Franco Comotti (Alfa Romeo Tipo-B 'P3')
- 1935 – (France) Raymond Sommer (Alfa Romeo Tipo-B 'P3')
- 1936 – (France) Jean-Pierre Wimille (Bugatti T59/57)
- 1939 – (France) René Le Bègue (Talbot MD90)
- 1947 – (Monaco) Louis Chiron (Talbot Monoplace C39)
- 1948 – (Italy) Luigi Villoresi (Maserati 4CLT/48)
- 1949 – (France) Charles Pozzi (Delahaye 145)
- 1952 – (France) André Simon / (Italy) Alberto Ascari (Ferrari Tipo 500)
