= Circuit des Remparts =

Race circuit in Angoulême, France

Coordinates: 45°38′58″N 0°09′25″E

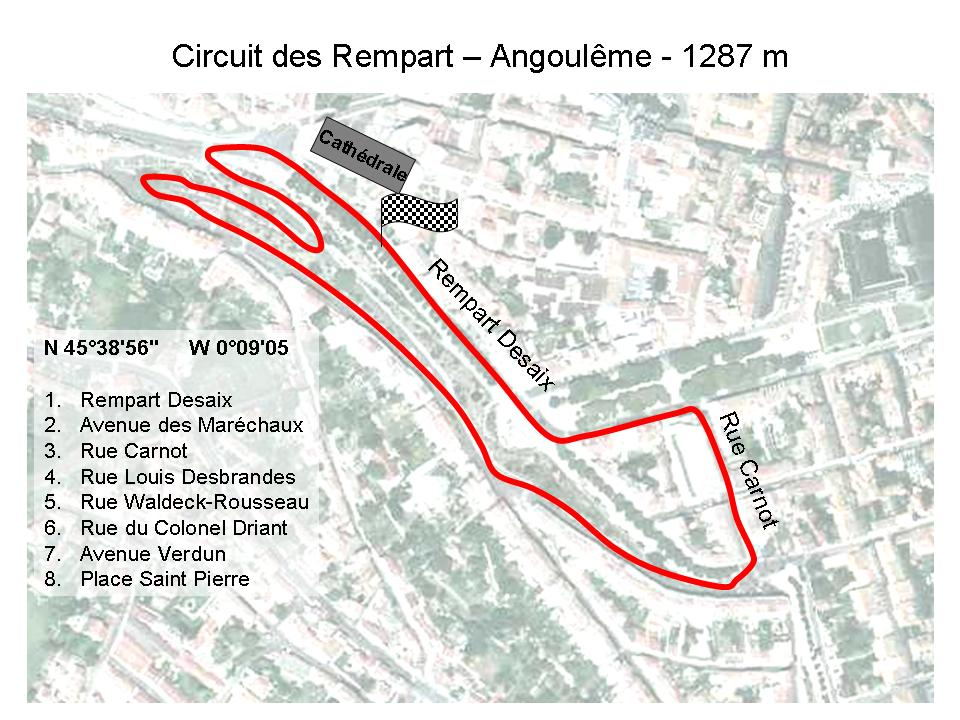

Circuit des Remparts is a historic race circuit in Angoulême, France, using the town's ancient road layout.

== History ==
Used once in 1939 for a circuit race for Grand Prix cars and Formula Two voiturettes, The circuit had a length of 1287 metres, which was driven for 80 laps. This urban race track returned to use after World War II from 1947 to 1951 as part of the Formula 2 Championship, hosting events where famous drivers could be seen, such as Juan Manuel Fangio, Maurice Trintignant, Raymond Sommer, Robert Manzon, André Simon and the like.

Today a successful historic festival event continues, usually held in September, that gathers historic car enthusiasts for a series of races for classic and historic cars, on the original race track. It also features a "Concours d'Élégance" and a concours of car restoration.

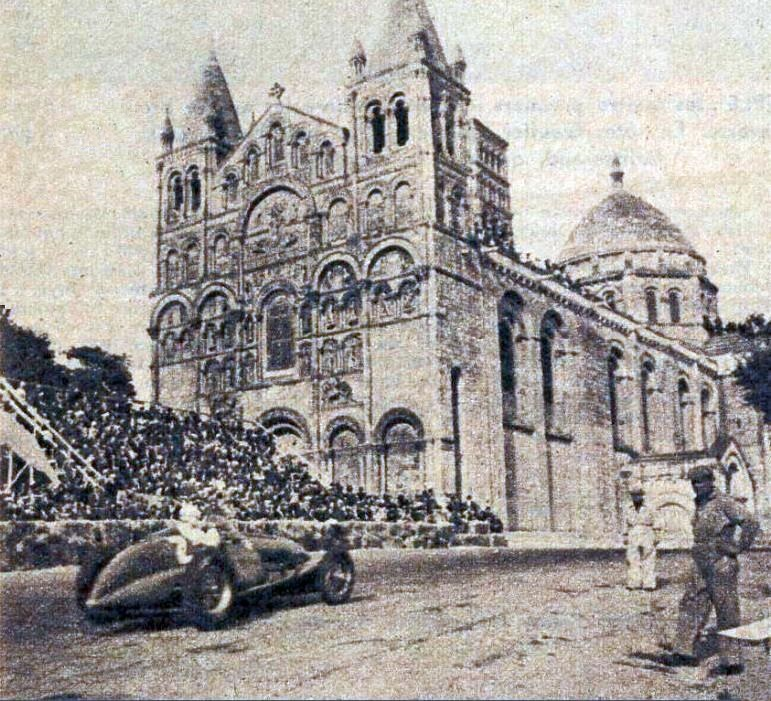
1939 winner Raymond Sommer in front of the Angoulême Cathedral

The historic event was used as the basis for "Le Défi des Remparts" (1988), a volume of the Michel Vaillant comic book series.

== Results ==
| date | Pilot | Car |
|---|---|---|
| 1939 | (France) Raymond Sommer | Alfa Romeo 308 |
| 1947 | (France) Eugène Martin | BMW 328 |
| 1948 | (Russia) Igor Troubetzkoy | Simca-Gordini T15 |
| 1949 | (France) Maurice Trintignant | Simca-Gordini T11 |
| 1950 | (Argentina) Juan Manuel Fangio | Maserati 4CLT/48 |
| 1951 | (Switzerland) Rudi Fischer | Ferrari 212 |
