= Giovanni Rocco =

Italian racing driver (1906 – ?)

- Born: Giovanni Rocco; 10 November 1906 Naples, Italy

Giovanni Rocco (10 November 1906 – ?) was an Italian racing driver, who took part in the 1939 Swiss Grand Prix.

== Career ==
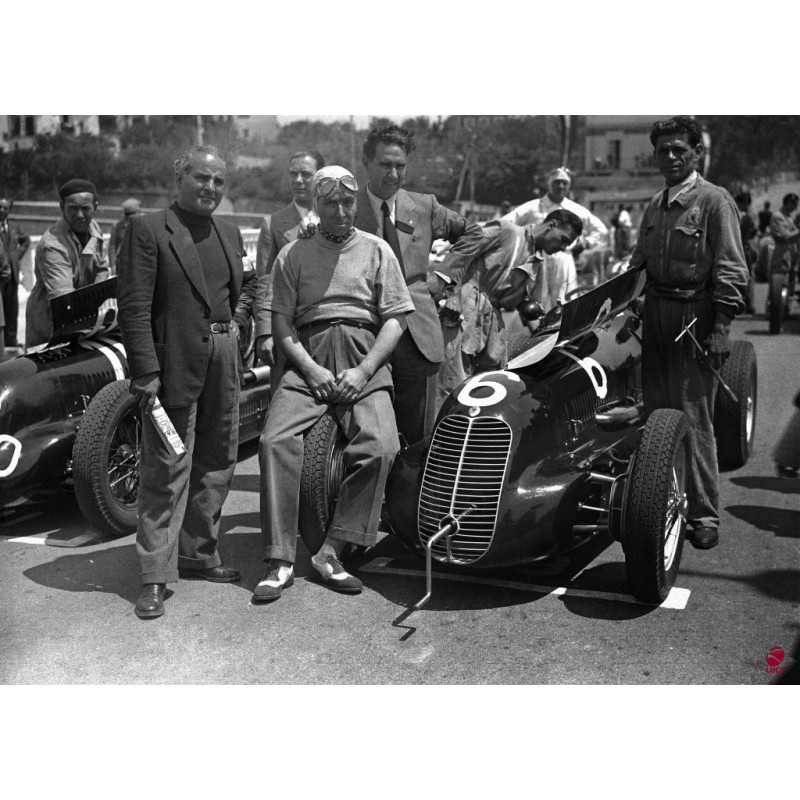
Giovanni Rocco and helpers at the Coppa Principesa di Piemonte in Naples in 1939, with Maserati 4CL

Rocco started racing in 1934 in an old Maserati 26B. In 1937 he bought a Maserati 6CM and was so successful - winning the Circuito di Campione d'Italia, and finishing 3rd at the Gran Premio di San Remo and Coppa Edda Ciano - that the works team invited him to join for the 1938 season.

He duly took part in many of the voiturette races in a Maserati 4CL, his main victories coming in the Targa Florio - by this time, a 30 lap dash around a circuit near Palermo, and in practice restricted to Italian voiturette racers - and the Coppa Acerbo Vetturette in Pescara.

His one national Grand Prix appearance came at the last before the Second World War, the 1939 Swiss Grand Prix, for which there was a voiturette heat, the first six of which could take part in the Grand Prix itself. Rocco finished 4th in his 4CL, but his Grand Prix ended on the second lap.

Rocco returned to racing after the war, mostly in small capacity sportscars, until 1954; his most notable victory came in the 1947 Circuito di Benevento, in an ageing Alfa Romeo 8C 2300. However his best result was third in a full-format Targa Florio in 1949, in the one-off A.M.P. Special, built by co-driver Placido Prete from an Alfa and a Maserati.

His final single-seater races came at the Monza Grand Prix in 1951 (driving a HWM), and at the Naples and Monza Grands Prix in 1952, driving a Zagato-bodied Monaci, powered by two 1-litre FIAT engines; he retired both times, albeit after impressing with cornering speed.

== Results ==
- Single-seaters
- Sportscars
