= Fiat Topolino =

Fiat Topolino may refer to:

- Fiat 500 "Topolino", a city car produced and manufactured by Fiat from 1936 to 1955
- Fiat Topolino (2023), a rebadged Citroën Ami electric quadricycle produced since 2023
