= Conn Pollock =

British businessman and racing driver

- Born: Allen Conn Pollock; 27 June 1902 Farsley, Yorkshire
- Died: 28 January 1969 (aged 66) Marylebone

Allen Conn Pollock (22 June 1902 – 28 January 1969), normally referred to as Conn Pollock or A. C. Pollock, was an English businessman who was also an amateur racing driver before the Second World War.

== Personal life ==
Pollock was the son of Major William Pollock, a Derry-born operator of a worsted mill in Huddersfield, operating under the name Josiah France Limited; Pollock duly entered the family business on leaving school, and spent his working life at the company, taking over as managing director on the death of his father in 1936, and holding the position until his retirement in 1962. Pollock married Claire Taylor in Huddersfield on 15 July 1946.

== Motor racing career ==
In 1938, Pollock bought a voiturette formula car - E.R.A. R2A - from Greek racer Nicholas Embiricos, and raced it 9 times between July 1938 and August 1939. His most notable results were 5th place finishes in the 1939 Coppa Acerbo on the fearsome Pescara Circuit, and in the British Empire Trophy at Donington Park. His last race was at the 1939 Swiss Grand Prix, held a mere two weeks before the start of the war; he finished 8th in the voiturette heat, so did not qualify for the Grand Prix proper. Pollock sold the car in 1946 to George Abecassis.

== Second World War ==
Pollock gained his pilot's licence in 1929 after a mere 8 hours' tuition, and took part in a number of air races in the early 1930s. After the outbreak of war, he therefore signed up to the Air Transport Auxiliary as a pilot. He survived a crash in 1944 at RAF Kirkbride after his De Havilland Mosquito suffered a birdstrike and the landing gear failed, but co-pilot Joseph Wheelock was killed.

== Horse racing ==
In 1964, Pollock went into partnership with another wool entrepreneur, Tony Holland, and they bought a number of racehorses, the entries being split between them. One of the horses, Siliconn, whose jockeys bore the Pollock colours, won the Cork and Orrery Stakes at Royal Ascot in 1967.
