= Adolfo Mandirola =

Swiss racing driver (1896–1958)

Adolfo Mandirola, also known as Adolphe Mandirola (1896–1958), was a Swiss racing driver active either side of the Second World War.

== Career ==
Mandirola's specialism was in hillclimbing, and he finished third in the 5000cc sportscar category at the prestigious La Turbie hillclimb in 1936, in a Maserati, behind future Grand Prix winner Jean-Pierre Wimille and 24 Hours of Le Mans winner Raymond Sommer. His entries were via the team name Ecurie Genevoise.

He first appeared at an international race in 1937, finishing 7th at the Turin Grand Prix in a Maserati V8RI. He took part in the 1937 and 1938 Swiss Grands Prix and 1937 Eifelrennen in a Maserati 8CM, retiring from all.

In 1939 tried his hand at the Belgian Grand Prix, in which he also retired, having managed to push Georg Meier into a ditch. His last pre-war Grand Prix appearance was at the 1939 German Grand Prix; he was running last on lap 11, already having made four pit-stops, when he ran out of fuel behind the pits, and had a can of fuel handed to him to top up. This was against the regulations and he was disqualified.

Mandirola had a handful of unsuccessful races in 1947, splitting between a Maserati 4CL and Maserati 6CM, before stepping back from elite sport; he raced in hillclimbs in his re-bodied 8CM until the mid-1950s.
