= Hermann Paul Müller =

German motorcycle racer and racing driver (1909–1975)

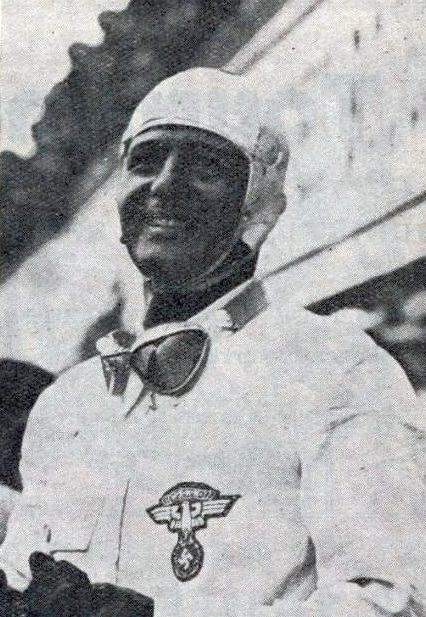
- Nationality: German
- Born: 21 November 1909; Bielefeld, German Empire
- Died: 30 December 1975 (aged 66); Ingolstadt, West Germany
Motorcycle racing career statistics
Grand Prix motorcycle racing
Active years	1952 – 1955
First race	1952 125cc Spanish Grand Prix
Last race	1955 250cc Nations Grand Prix
First win	1955 250cc German Grand Prix
Last win	1955 250cc German Grand Prix
Team	NSU
Championships	250cc – 1955
Starts / Wins / Podiums / Poles / F. laps / Points; 20 / 1 / 8 / N/A / 2 / 54 (57)

Hermann Paul Müller (21 November 1909 – 30 December 1975) was a German sidecar, motorcycle, and race car driver.

Müller started his competitive career on an Imperia in 1928. He became German Sidecar Champion in 1932, then in 1936, he took the German 500cc Motorcycle title.

Müller switched to cars the next year, driving for Auto Union. He won the 1939 edition of the FIA French Grand Prix held in Reims. The winner of that season's European Championship was never officially announced by the AIACR due to the outbreak of World War II. Although Müller would have won the championship on points, despite this the president of Germany's highest motorsports organisation declared Hermann Lang the champion.

After the war, Müller returned to motorcycle racing, winning the 1947 and 1948 German 250cc titles on DKW. In 1955, he won the 250cc world championship riding an NSU Sportmax. He also set quite a number of world speed records in five classes over six distances for NSU on the Bonneville salt flats in 1956. To this day he remains the oldest person to win a Grand Prix Motorcycle world championship, at the age of 46.

== Racing record ==
=== Complete European Championship results ===
(key) (Races in bold indicate pole position)

Year	Entrant	Make	1	2	3	4	5	EDC	Points
1937	Auto Union	Auto Union Type C	BEL; Ret	GER; Ret	MON	SUI	ITA; 5	14th	33
1938	Auto Union	Auto Union Type D	FRA; DNS	GER; 4	SUI; Ret	ITA; Ret		5th	20
1939	Auto Union	Auto Union Type D	BEL; Ret	FRA; 1	GER; 2	SUI; 4		**1st**	**12**

=== Motorcycle Grand Prix results ===
Points system from 1950 to 1968.

**Position**	1	2	3	4	5	6
**Points**	8	6	4	3	2	1

(key) (Races in italics indicate fastest lap)

Year	Class	Team	1	2	3	4	5	6	7	8	9	Points	Rank	Wins
1952	125cc	Mondial	IOM	NED	GER	ULS	NAT	ESP; 5				2	15th	0
1953	350cc	Horex	IOM	NED	BEL		FRA	ULS	SUI; 7	NAT; 7		0	-	0
1953	500cc	MV Agusta	IOM	NED	BEL		FRA	ULS	SUI; Ret	NAT; 6	ESP	1	19th	0
1954	125cc	NSU		IOM; Ret	ULS; 2	NED; 2	GER; 4		NAT	ESP		15	**3rd**	0
1954	250cc	NSU	FRA; 2	IOM; 4	ULS; 3	NED; 5	GER; 14	SUI; 3	NAT			17 (19)	**3rd**	0
1955	250cc	NSU		IOM; 3	GER; 1		NED; 3	ULS; 6	NAT; 4			19 (20)	**1st**	1
