= René Le Bègue =

French racing driver (1914–1946)

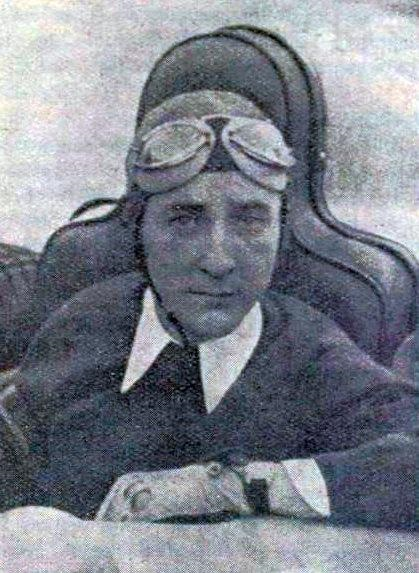
- Le Bègue in 1939
- Born: René Louis Paul Le Bègue; 15 January 1914 9th arrondissement of Paris, France
- Died: 24 February 1946 (aged 32) Versailles, Seine-et-Oise, France

Champ Car career
- 1 race run over 2 years
- Best finish: 18th (1940)
- First race: 1940 Indianapolis 500 (Indianapolis)
Wins	Podiums	Poles
0	0	0

24 Hours of Le Mans career
- Years: 1938–1939
- Teams: Chinetti
- Best finish: DNF (1938, 1939)
- Class wins: 0

René Louis Paul Le Bègue (15 January 1914 – 24 February 1946) was a French racing driver.

== Driving career ==
In his first year of top level racing, Le Bègue's best showing came at the 1936 Spa 24 Hours endurance race when he drove a Delahaye to a 2nd-place finish. In 1937 he and his co-pilot Julio Quinlin won the Monte Carlo Rally driving a Delahaye. That year Le Bègue also won the Coupe de Vitesse at the Autodrome de Montlhéry driving a Talbot-Lago T150 and had several top-three finishes. He then teamed up with André Morel to claim victory in the 1938 12 hours of Paris endurance race for sports cars. In 1939 he finished 3rd in the French Grand Prix behind the dominant Auto Union Silver Arrows then went on to win the Grand Prix du Comminges.

The following year, Le Bègue traveled to the United States to compete in the 1940 Indianapolis 500 alongside fellow Frenchman René Dreyfus. Driving a pair of Maseratis for the American/French owner Lucy O'Reilly Schell, Le Bègue qualified 31st, but Dreyfus was bumped and ended up as the second alternate. On race day, it was decided for the two drivers to split time in the car, and each drove two stints of approximately 50 laps (125 miles) apiece. Le Bègue started the race and ran approximately laps 1–50 and laps 101–150. Dreyfus piloted the car for laps 51–100 and from 151 to the finish. The pair brought the car home in 10th place, flagged 8 laps down. A rainstorm prompted officials to flag the race after only the first three finishers received the checkered flag.

Le Bègue continued racing until the German occupation of France during World War II when he joined the Free French Forces. With the war over, in 1946 he prepared to return to the racing scene and was elected vice-president of the French Drivers Association (AGACI, Association Générale des Amicales et Coureurs Indépendants). However, early that year before the season started the thirty-two-year-old Le Bègue was accidentally asphyxiated by gas leaking from a defective water heater in his bathroom. The 9 June 1946 Grand Prix race at Saint-Cloud, won by Raymond Sommer, was named the René Le Bègue Cup in his memory.

== Motorsports career results ==
=== Indianapolis 500 results ===
Year	Car	Start	Qual	Rank	Finish	Laps	Led	Retired
1940	49	31	118.981	33	10	192	0	Flagged
Totals						192	0	

Starts	1
Poles	0
Front Row	0
Wins	0
Top 5	0
Top 10	1
Retired	0
