= Hermann Lang =

German racing driver (1909–1987)

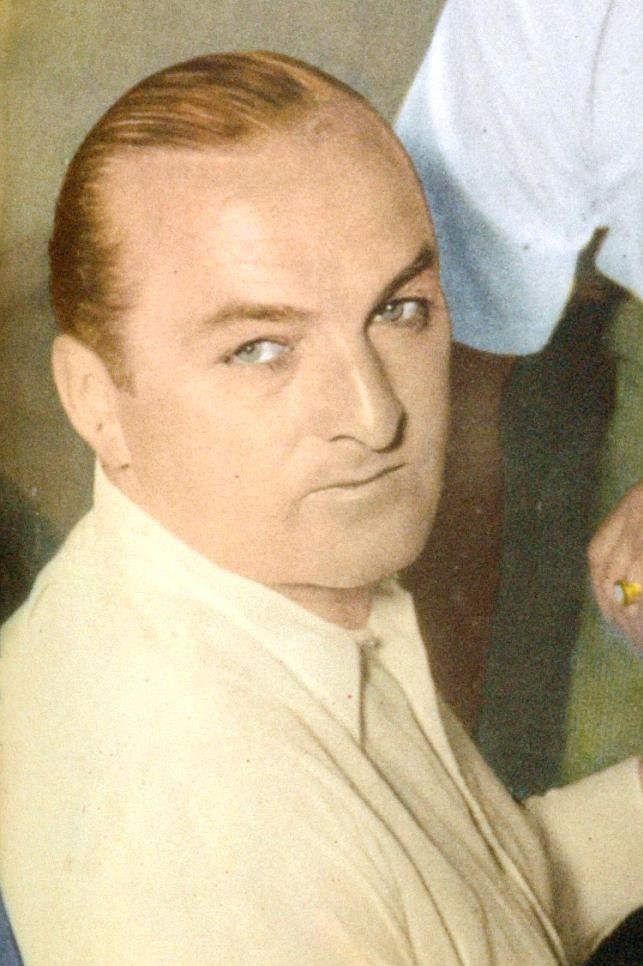
- Lang in 1951
- Born: Hermann Albert Lang; 6 April 1909; Cannstatt, Kingdom of Württemberg, German Empire
- Died: 19 October 1987 (aged 78); Bad Cannstatt, Baden-Württemberg, West Germany

Formula One World Championship career
- Nationality: (Germany) German
- Active years: 1953–1954
- Team(s): Maserati, Mercedes
- Entries: 2
- Championships: 0
- Wins: 0
- Podiums: 0
- Career points: 2
- Pole positions: 0
- Fastest laps: 0
- First entry: 1953 Swiss Grand Prix
- Last entry: 1954 German Grand Prix

Hermann Albert Lang (6 April 1909 – 19 October 1987) was a German racing driver who raced motorcycles, Grand Prix cars, and sports cars.

== Prewar racing ==
Born in Cannstatt near Stuttgart, Baden-Württemberg, Germany, Hermann Lang had to go to work at age fourteen to help support his family following the death of his father. Young Lang found a job as a motorcycle mechanic, eventually buying his own used bike with which he began amateur racing. He won the first race he entered and before long decided to compete in the sidecar class. At age twenty-two, he won the German sidecar mountain race championship.

Lang's big break came when he landed a job at the Mercedes factory where he became part of their Grand Prix motor racing team. He was made head mechanic for the Mercedes-Benz W25A model to be driven by the Italian star Luigi Fagioli who had left Alfa Romeo to create a powerhouse Mercedes factory team that also included Rudolf Caracciola. Following a very successful season in which Fagioli won both the Italian and Spanish Grand Prix, Hermann Lang was given a chance to drive for the Mercedes team. He proved to be most capable on high-speed racetracks, capturing his first win in the 1937 Tripoli Grand Prix at the Mellaha Lake course in Libya which was then the fastest racetrack in the world. Lang dominated the event, winning it for three straight years. That year he won his second major race at the AVUS extravaganza.

In 1938, Lang won two more races for Mercedes including the prestigious Coppa Ciano at Livorno, Italy. Nevertheless, in spite of Hermann Lang's skills and racing success and his popularity with racing fans, being a part of the Mercedes Silver Arrows team was not easy. Made up of wealthy and aristocratic drivers who looked down on the uneducated, working-class Lang, he was always treated as an outsider. However, in 1939, he earned their grudging respect when he won five of the eight Grand Prix races he started, including victories at the Belgian Grand Prix, the Pau Grand Prix in France, the Swiss Grand Prix and his third consecutive Tripoli Grand Prix. In addition to being a quick driver, Lang was also advantaged in that being a former mechanic, he had a lot of mechanical knowledge of cars and was able to give good technical feedback during testing and races to chief designer Rudolf Uhlenhaut, who was able to develop the Mercedes cars to a greater degree, and Lang's natural feel for the machinery meant that he was able to get set-ups on his cars that made them faster than his rivals' cars. He clocked the fastest lap at the French Grand Prix and was leading the field but engine trouble knocked him out of the race. In 1939, Lang also competed in, and won, the Kahlenberg hillclimbing race in Austria.

== 1939 championship controversy ==
In 1939, Lang was declared the champion of the European Championship, but this is unofficial. The season was cut short by World War II and Lang received this title from the German motor racing authority, instead of the official authority AIACR, based in Paris. By way of the points at the last attempted race of the season, competitor Hermann Paul Müller was considered the points leader, not Lang.

== Postwar racing ==
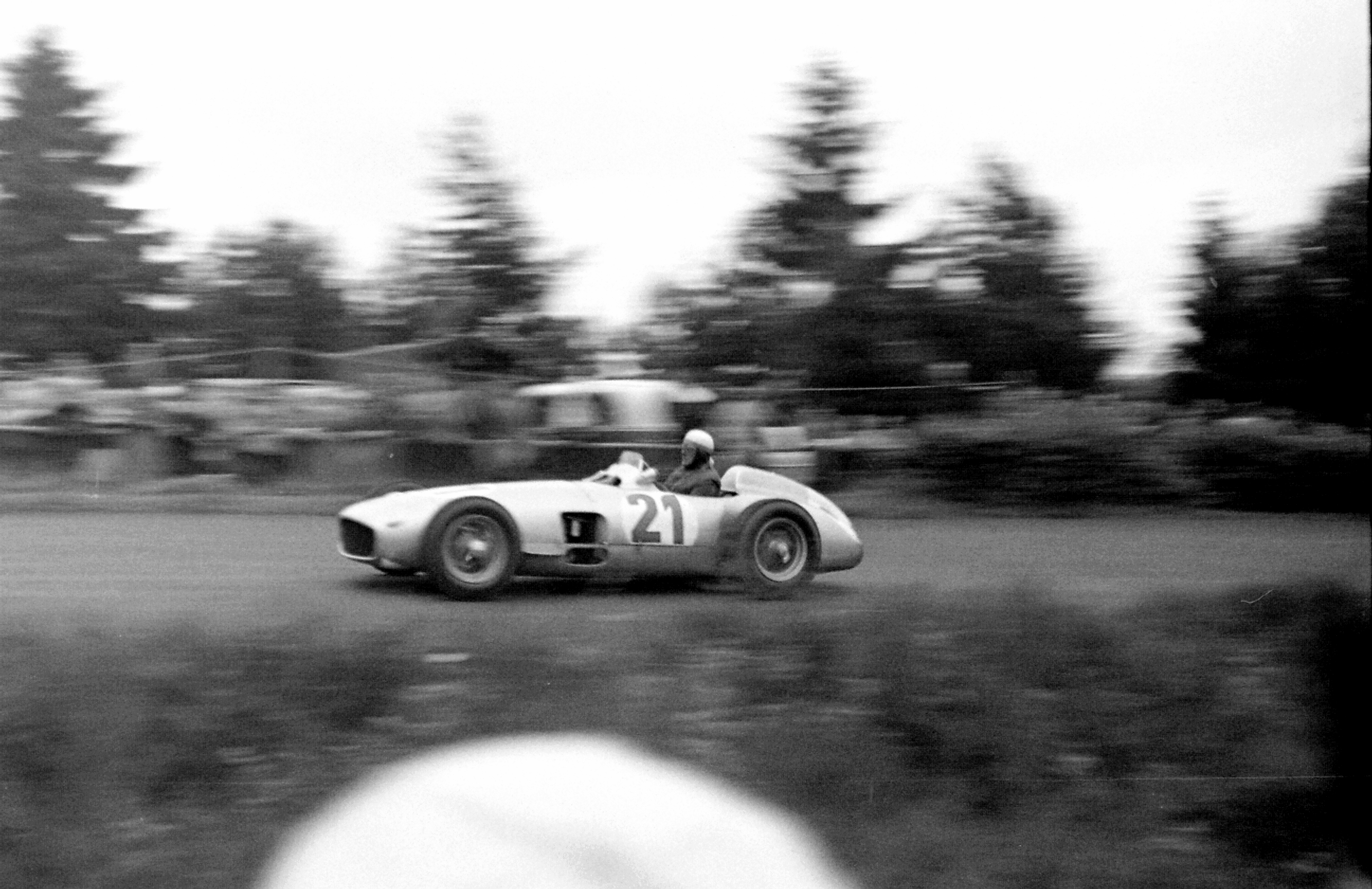
Hermann Lang in an open wheel W196 at the 1954 German Grand Prix

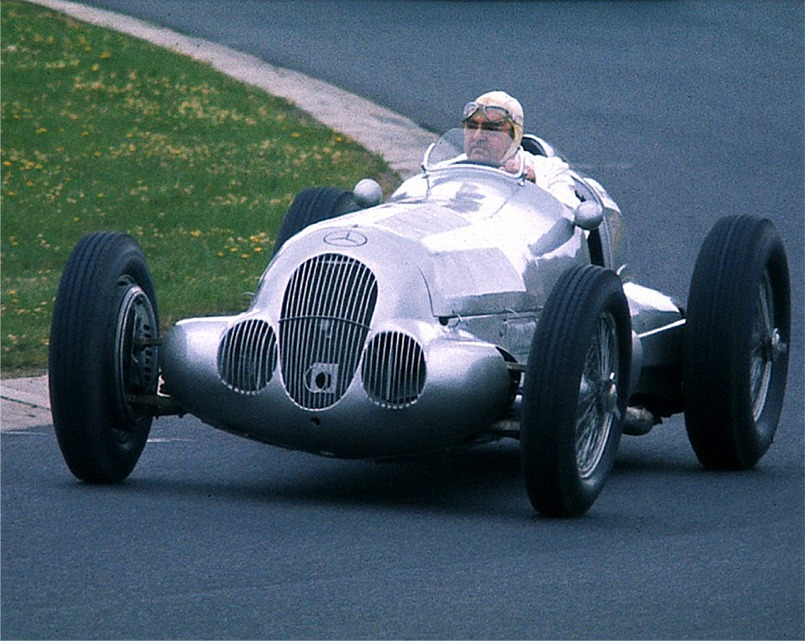
Lang, third in the 1937 European Championship, demonstrates a Mercedes-Benz W125 in 1977

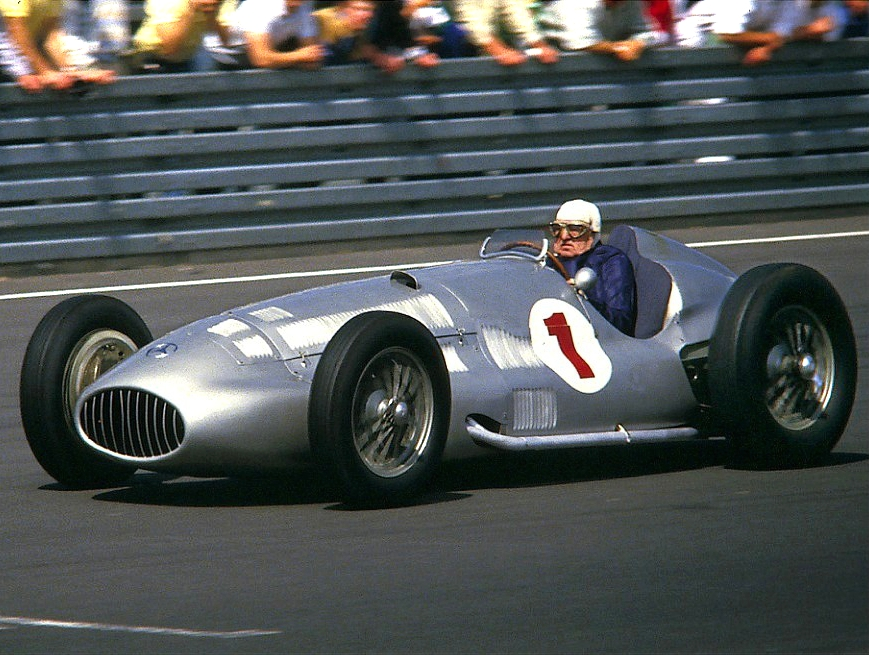
Hermann Lang in a Mercedes-Benz W154, 1986

The onset of World War II robbed Lang of his best years but after the war ended, he returned to racing in 1946 without a team, driving a six-year-old BMW to victory in the first post-war race in Germany held at Ruhestein. In 1949 he began sports car racing and then competed in Formula Two racing before rejoining the Mercedes Grand Prix racing team which in early 1951 tested pre-war Mercedes-Benz W154 in Formula Libre races in Argentina, the 1951 Buenos Aires Grand Prix (I) and 1951 Buenos Aires Grand Prix (II), in which Lang finished second and third.

As a result, Mercedes postponed Formula One racing to 1954, and in 1952 raced sportscars. At age 43, he and pre-war rival Rudolf Caracciola, were to be joined by Luigi Fagioli, another pre-war GP winner for Mercedes, but both suffered career-ending crashes before the 1952 24 Hours of Le Mans. Lang teamed up with Fritz Riess in a 300SL to capture the win. Karl Kling won the other major race for Mercedes, the 1952 Carrera Panamericana.

The following year, Lang published his autobiography titled "Grand Prix Driver," with the Foreword written by the Mercedes team manager, Alfred Neubauer. Published in Germany, it was translated into English by Charles Meisl and brought out in England. Also in 1953, an off-season for Mercedes, Lang was given a chance to participate in Formula One World Championship racing, actually run to Formula Two rules in that years. He was driving for Maserati after one of their team drivers was injured, and raced in two F1 events that year with his best result a fifth-place finish at the 1953 Swiss Grand Prix.

With new rules for the 1954 Formula One season, Mercedes rejoined Grand Prix racing. At the 1954 French Grand Prix, three Mercedes-Benz W196 debuted with enclosed streamliner bodywork suited only for fast tracks like Reims and Monza. Juan Manuel Fangio was the team leader, and having already scored two wins with Maserati, he added a third for Mercedes. He was supported by two Germans, Karl Kling and a young Hans Herrmann. The streamliners were not suitable for Silverstone and other twisty tracks, thus Mercedes added three new proper open wheel chassis for the 1954 German Grand Prix at Nürburgring. Herrmann had to use one of the streamliners, which he qualified in fourth, 11 seconds behind pole sitter Fangio, but a fuel leak cut his race short. Lang qualified 11th, 23 seconds slower in the new car, while Kling had no opportunity to practise, and had to start from the back of the field. After Kling caught up, the three 40+ years old Mercedes drivers lead the race that lasted 3 hours and 45 minutes. As usual, Fangio won, while Kling had to pit and set fastest lap of the race. Lang spun out after ten laps, even though he was running as high as second in front of his teammate Karl Kling. Lang recognized his time had come to retire from racing, and returned to his job at the Mercedes factory.

== Racing record ==
=== Complete European Championship results ===
(key) (Races in bold indicate pole position) (Races in italics indicate fastest lap)

Year	Entrant	Chassis	Engine	1	2	3	4	5	6	7	EDC	Pts
1935	Daimler-Benz AG	Mercedes W25A	Mercedes 3.4 L8	MON	FRA	BEL	GER; Ret		ITA; Ret	ESP	12th	45
1935	Daimler-Benz AG	Mercedes W25B	Mercedes 4.0 L8					SUI; 6			12th	45
1936	Daimler-Benz AG	Mercedes W25K	Mercedes 4.7 L8	MON	GER; Ret	SUI; 4	ITA				10th	24
1937	Daimler-Benz AG	Mercedes W125	Mercedes 5.7 L8	BEL; 3	GER; 7	MON; DNS	SUI; 2	ITA; 2			3rd	19
1938	Daimler-Benz AG	Mercedes W154	Mercedes 3.0 V12	**FRA**; 3	GER; Ret	SUI; 10	**ITA**; Ret				3rd	17
1939	Daimler-Benz AG	Mercedes W154	Mercedes 3.0 V12	BEL; 1	**FRA**; Ret	**GER**; Ret	**SUI**; 1				2nd	14

=== Complete Formula One results ===
(key)

Year	Team	Chassis	Engine	1	2	3	4	5	6	7	8	9	WDC	Pts
1953	Officine Alfieri Maserati	Maserati A6GCM	Maserati A6 2.0 L6	ARG	500	NED	BEL	FRA	GBR	GER	SUI; 5	ITA	17th	2
1954	Daimler Benz AG	Mercedes-Benz W196	Mercedes M196 2.5 L8	ARG	500	BEL	FRA	GBR	GER; Ret	SUI	ITA	ESP	NC	0

=== Complete 24 Hours of Le Mans results ===
Year	Team	Co-Drivers	Car	Class	Laps	Pos.	Class Pos.
1952	(West Germany) Daimler-Benz AG	(West Germany) Fritz Riess	Mercedes-Benz W194	S 3.0	277	**1st**	**1st**

Sporting positions
Preceded by Hans Stuck	German Mountain Climb Champion; 1939	Succeeded by None
Preceded by Peter Walker; Peter Whitehead	Winner of the 24 Hours of Le Mans; 1952; With: Fritz Riess	Succeeded by Tony Rolt; Duncan Hamilton
