= 1939 German Grand Prix =

- Race 3 of 4 in the 1939 European Championship

Race details
- Date: 23 July 1939
- Official name: XII Großer Preis von Deutschland
- Location: Nürburgring; Nürburg, Germany
- Course: Permanent racing facility
- Course length: 22.810 km (14.173 miles)
- Distance: 22 laps, 501.82 km (311.82 miles)
- Weather: Rain

Pole position
Driver	(Germany) Hermann Lang	Mercedes-Benz
- Time: 9:43.1

Fastest lap
Driver	(Germany) Rudolf Caracciola	Mercedes-Benz
- Time: 10:24.2

Podium
First	(Germany) Rudolf Caracciola	Mercedes-Benz
Second	(Germany) Hermann Paul Müller	Auto Union
Third	(Germany) Paul Pietsch	Maserati

The 1939 German Grand Prix was a Grand Prix motor race held at the Nürburgring on 23 July 1939.

== Classification ==
Pos	No	Driver	Team	Car	Laps	Time/Retired	Grid	Points
1	12	(Germany) Rudolf Caracciola	Daimler-Benz AG	Mercedes-Benz W154	22	4:08:41.8	3	1
2	6	(Germany) Hermann Paul Müller	Auto Union	Auto Union D	22	+57.8	4	2
3	32	(Germany) Paul Pietsch	Officine A. Maserati	Maserati 8CTF	21	+1 Lap	8	3
4	24	(France) René Dreyfus	Ecurie Lucy O'Reilly Schell	Delahaye 145	20	+2 Laps	12	4
5	26	(France) "Raph"	Ecurie Lucy O'Reilly Schell	Delahaye 145	19	+3 Laps	15	4
6	28	(France) Robert Mazaud	Private entry	Delahaye T135CS	19	+3 Laps	16	4
7	40	(Germany) Leonhard Joa	Süddeutsche Renngemeinschaft	Maserati 4CM	19	+3 Laps	14	4
Ret	2	(Italy) Tazio Nuvolari	Auto Union	Auto Union D	18	Engine	6	4
Ret	8	(Germany) Rudolf Hasse	Auto Union	Auto Union D	11	Accident	10	5
Ret	10	(Germany) Georg Meier	Auto Union	Auto Union D	10	Broken front stub axle	9	6
DSQ	36	(Switzerland) Adolfo Mandirola	Private entry	Maserati 6CM	9	Disqualified	17	8
Ret	30	(Italy) Luigi Villoresi	Officine A. Maserati	Maserati 8CTF	6	Fuel tank	11	6
Ret	14	(Germany) Manfred von Brauchitsch	Daimler-Benz AG	Mercedes-Benz W154	5	Leaking tank	2	7
Ret	20	(Germany) Heinz Brendel	Daimler-Benz AG	Mercedes-Benz W154	3	Accident	5	7
Ret	16	(Germany) Hermann Lang	Daimler-Benz AG	Mercedes-Benz W154	2	Engine	1	7
Ret	22	(France) Raymond Sommer	Private entry	Alfa Romeo Tipo 308	0	Engine	13	7
Ret	4	(Germany) Hans Stuck	Auto Union	Auto Union D	0	Fuel pipe	7	7

Grand Prix Race
Previous race: 1939 French Grand Prix	1939 Grand Prix season Grandes Épreuves	Next race: 1939 Swiss Grand Prix
Previous race: 1938 German Grand Prix	German Grand Prix	Next race: 1950 German Grand Prix
