= 1939 Swiss Grand Prix =

- Race 4 of 4 in the 1939 European Championship

Race details
- Date: 20 August 1939
- Official name: VI Großer Preis der Schweiz
- Location: Bremgarten; Bern, Switzerland
- Course: Road course
- Course length: 7.28 km (4.52 miles)
- Distance: 30 laps, 218.40 km (135.71 miles)
- Weather: Rain

Pole position
Driver	(Germany) Hermann Lang	Mercedes-Benz
- Grid positions set by heat results

Fastest lap
Driver	(Germany) Hermann Lang	Mercedes-Benz
- Time: 2:38.4

Podium
First	(Germany) Hermann Lang	Mercedes-Benz
Second	(Germany) Rudolf Caracciola	Mercedes-Benz
Third	(Germany) Manfred von Brauchitsch	Mercedes-Benz

The 1939 Swiss Grand Prix was a motor race held at Bremgarten on 20 August 1939.

The Grand Prix was run as a combined event for Grand Prix cars and Voiturettes. Each class had a heat with the best from each going through to a combined final. This was the last victory for a German driver driving a German car until Nico Rosberg's victory at the 2012 Chinese Grand Prix.

== Classification ==
=== Final ===
Voiturette cars are denoted by a pink background

Pos	No	Driver	Team	Car	Laps	Time/Retired	Grid	Points
1	16	(Germany) Hermann Lang	Daimler-Benz AG	Mercedes-Benz W154	30	1:24:47.6	1	1
2	14	(Germany) Rudolf Caracciola	Daimler-Benz AG	Mercedes-Benz W154	30	+3.1	2	2
3	10	(Germany) Manfred von Brauchitsch	Daimler-Benz AG	Mercedes-Benz W154	30	+1:09.9	3	3
4	4	(Germany) Hermann Paul Müller	Auto Union	Auto Union D	30	+2:13.7	9	4
5	6	(Italy) Tazio Nuvolari	Auto Union	Auto Union D	30	+2:25.0	4	4
6	12	(Germany) Hans Hartmann	Daimler-Benz AG	Mercedes-Benz W154	29	+1 Lap	5	4
7	64	(Italy) Giuseppe Farina	Alfa Corse	Alfa Romeo 158	29	+1 Lap	6	4
8	28	(France) René Dreyfus	Écurie Lucy O'Reilly Schell	Maserati 8CTF	28	+2 Laps	13	4
9	66	(Italy) Clemente Biondetti	Alfa Corse	Alfa Romeo 158	28	+2 Laps	8	4
10	8	(Germany) Hans Stuck	Auto Union	Auto Union D	28	+2 Laps	7	4
11	32	(United Kingdom) Kenneth Evans	Private entry	Alfa Romeo Tipo B	27	+3 Laps	16	4
12	54	(United Kingdom) John Wakefield	Private entry	Maserati 4CL	26	+4 Laps	11	4
13	48	(United Kingdom) Robert Ansell	Private entry	ERA B	25	+5 Laps	15	4
Ret	72	(Switzerland) Toulo de Graffenried	Private entry	Maserati 6C-34	22		17	5
Ret	2	(Germany) Rudolf Hasse	Auto Union	Auto Union D	20	Lubrication	10	5
Ret	40	(Germany) Paul Pietsch	Private entry	Maserati 4CL	7		14	7
Ret	60	(Italy) Giovanni Rocco	Private entry	Maserati 4CL	3		12	7

=== Grand Prix heat ===
Pos	No	Driver	Team	Car	Laps	Time/Retired	Grid
1	16	(Germany) Hermann Lang	Daimler-Benz AG	Mercedes-Benz W154	20	53:40.0	1
2	14	(Germany) Rudolf Caracciola	Daimler-Benz AG	Mercedes-Benz W154	20	+4.8	3
3	10	(Germany) Manfred von Brauchitsch	Daimler-Benz AG	Mercedes-Benz W154	20	+30.7	2
4	6	(Italy) Tazio Nuvolari	Auto Union	Auto Union D	20	+40.5	5
5	12	(Germany) Hans Hartmann	Daimler-Benz AG	Mercedes-Benz W154	20	+2:53.1	8
6	8	(Germany) Hans Stuck	Auto Union	Auto Union D	19	+1 Lap	4
7	4	(Germany) Hermann Paul Müller	Auto Union	Auto Union D	19	+1 Lap	7
8	2	(Germany) Rudolf Hasse	Auto Union	Auto Union D	19	+1 Lap	6
9	28	(France) René Dreyfus	Ecurie Lucy O'Reilly Schell	Maserati 8CTF	19	+1 Lap	9
10	32	(United Kingdom) Kenneth Evans	Private entry	Alfa Romeo Tipo B	18	+2 Laps	11
11	72	(Switzerland) Toulo de Graffenried	Private entry	Maserati 6C-34	18	+2 Laps	10
12	18	(France) Robert Mazaud	Private entry	Delahaye T135CS	17	+3 Laps	12
Ret	24	(Switzerland) Max Christen	Private entry	Maserati 26B	4	Brakes	13
DNS	30	(France) "Raph"	Ecurie Lucy O'Reilly Schell	Maserati 6C-34		Broken piston	

=== Voiturette heat ===
Pos	No	Driver	Team	Car	Laps	Time/Retired	Grid
1	64	(Italy) Giuseppe Farina	Alfa Corse	Alfa Romeo 158	20	56:28.0	1
2	66	(Italy) Clemente Biondetti	Alfa Corse	Alfa Romeo 158	20	+37.0	5
3	54	(United Kingdom) John Wakefield	Private entry	Maserati 4CL	20	+1:08.9	4
4	60	(Italy) Giovanni Rocco	Private entry	Maserati 4CL	20	+1:46.9	2
5	40	(Germany) Paul Pietsch	Private entry	Maserati 4CL	19	+1 Lap	3
6	48	(United Kingdom) Robert Ansell	Private entry	ERA B	19	+1 Lap	8
7	44	(Germany) Leonhard Joa	Süddeutsche Renngemeinschaft	Maserati			7
8	50	(United Kingdom) Conn Pollock	Private entry	ERA A			6
Ret	56	(Italy) Guido Barbieri	Private entry	Maserati			10
Ret	46	(France) Marc Horvilleur	Private entry	Maserati 6CM			9

Grand Prix Race
Previous race: 1939 German Grand Prix	1939 Grand Prix season Grandes Épreuves	Next race: 1947 Swiss Grand Prix (post-war)
Previous race: 1938 Swiss Grand Prix	Swiss Grand Prix	Next race: 1947 Swiss Grand Prix
