= Maserati 4CM =

Open-wheel Grand Prix motor racing car

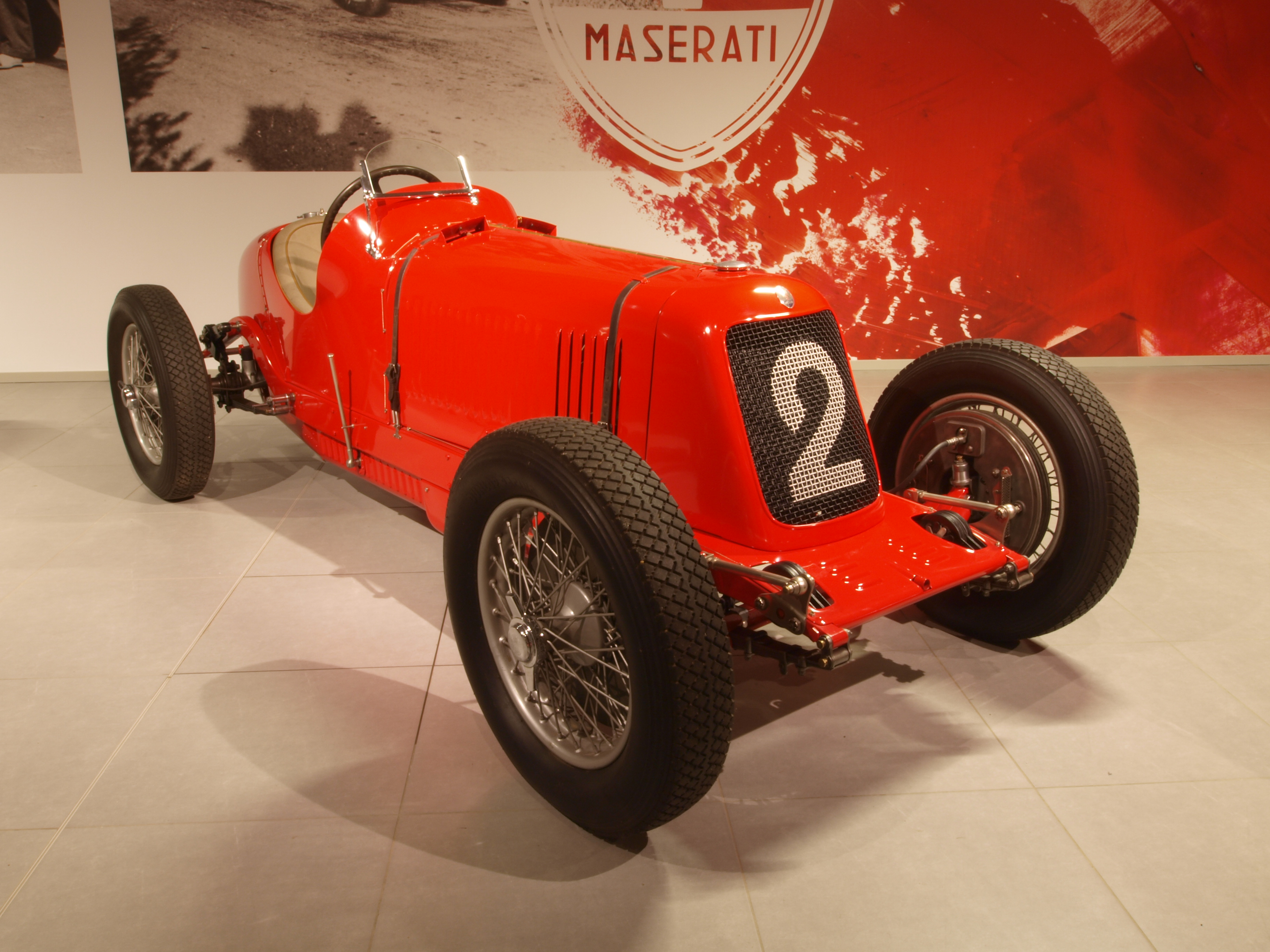
- 1933 Maserati 4CM
- Designer: Maserati
- Production: 1932-1938
- Predecessor: Maserati Tipo 26
- Successor: Maserati 6CM

Technical specifications
- Chassis: Steel box-section frame, aluminum body
- Suspension (front): Rigid axle, semi-elliptic leaf springs, friction shock absorbers
- Suspension (rear): Live axle, semi-elliptic leaf springs, friction shock absorbers
- Length: 3,680–4,000 mm (145–157 in)
- Width: 1,480–1,500 mm (58–59 in)
- Height: 1,200–1,350 mm (47–53 in)
- Axle track: 1,200 mm (47 in) (front and rear)
- Wheelbase: 2,400 mm (94 in)
- Engine: 1.1–2.5 L (67–153 cu in) I4 FR layout
- Transmission: 4 speed manual transmission
- Weight: 580 kg (1,280 lb)

Competition history

The Maserati 4CM is an open-wheel Grand Prix motor racing car, designed, developed and built by Italian manufacturer Maserati, in 1931.

In 1930, Maserati decided to concentrate its efforts on the voiturette class, which was not contested by German manufacturers such as Mercedes-Benz and Auto Union. The 1,100 cc (1.1 L; 67 cu in) Tipo 4CM was Maserati's first racing voiturette. The name of the car is derived as follows: 4: 4-cylinder engine; C: Corsa, for racing; M: Monoposto, for single seater.

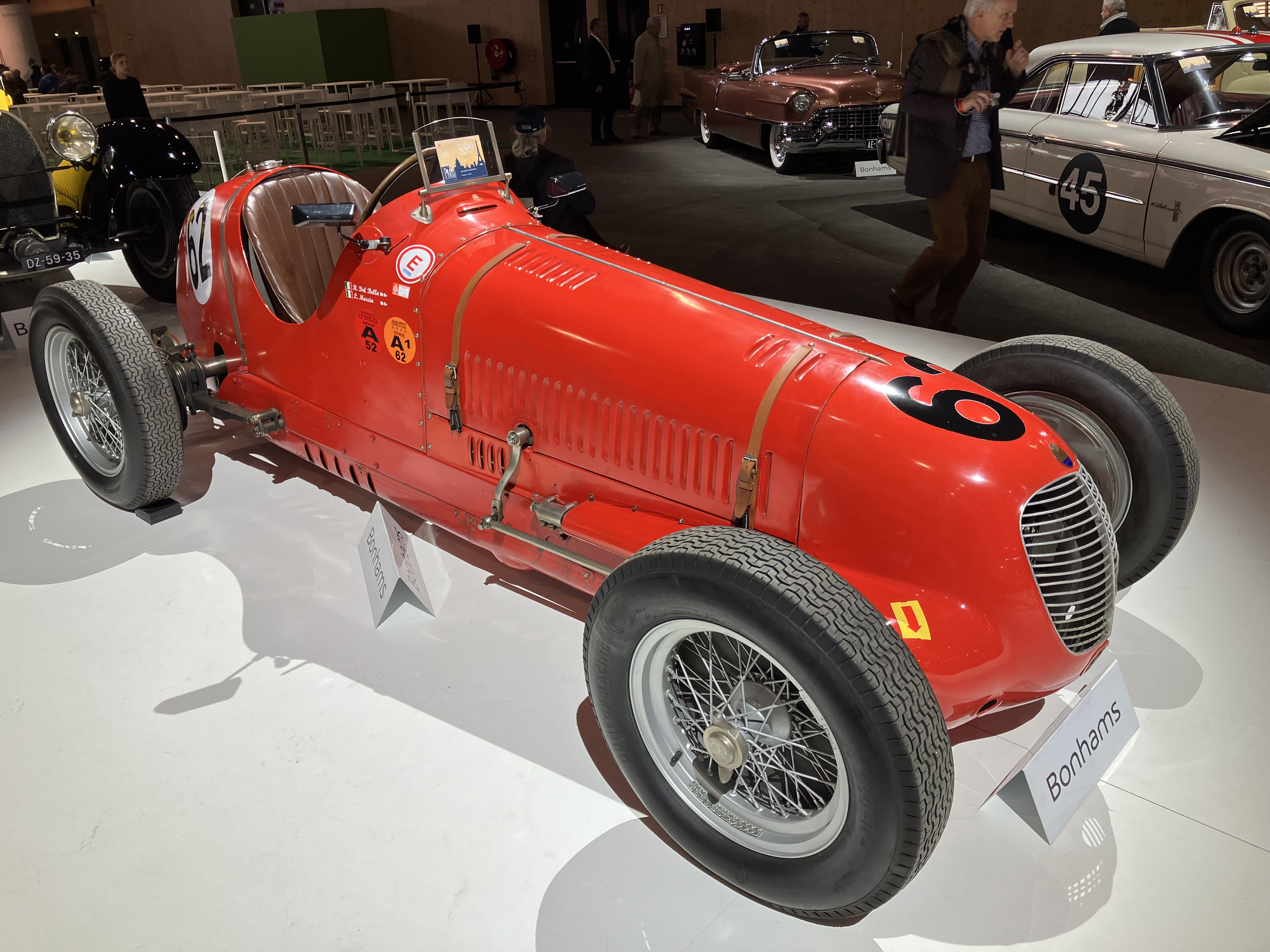
1937 Maserati 4CM

Built alongside the 4CS two-seater sports-racer, the 4CM was powered by a 1,088.4 cc (66.42 cu in), (65 x 82 mm) twin-overhead-camshaft supercharged four-cylinder engine that produced 125 hp (92 kW) at 6,600rpm, an output sufficient to propel it to a top speed of 210 km/h (130 mph). Some cars came with a spare cylinder block, pistons, connecting rods and supercharger enabling it to be converted to 1,495.7 cc (1.4957 L; 91.27 cu in), (69 x 100 mm) when required. Depending on the size of the engine, the roots-type supercharger boosted power to 90–150 hp (66–110 kW).

It succeeded the Maserati Tipo 26M, and was itself slowly replaced by the Maserati 6CM around 1936.

== Technical Information ==
	4CS-1100	4CM-1100	4CM-1500	4CM-2000	4CM-2500
Engine	straight-four engine				
Displacement	1.1 L (1,088 cc)		1.5 L (1,496 cc)	2.0 L (1,970 cc)	2.5 L (2,483 cc)
Bore × stroke	65 mm × 82 mm (2.6 in × 3.2 in)		69 mm × 100 mm (2.7 in × 3.9 in)	80 mm × 98 mm (3.1 in × 3.9 in)	84 mm × 112 mm (3.3 in × 4.4 in)
Compression ratio	5.1:1		6.0:1	5.8:1	5.8:1
Power	90 hp (66 kW) at 5,300 rpm		150 hp (110 kW) at 6,000 rpm	165 hp (121 kW) at 5,500 rpm	195 hp (143 kW) at 5,300 rpm
Valve control	two overhead camshafts / two valves per cylinder, Roots supercharger				
Body and frame	aluminium body on ladder frame				
Wheelbase	2,700 mm (110 in)	2,400 mm (94 in)			2,450 mm (96 in)
Curb weight (without driver)	630 kg (1,390 lb)	580 kg (1,280 lb)			600 kg (1,300 lb)
Top speed	150 km/h (93 mph)	185 km/h (115 mph)	190–230 km/h (118–143 mph)	215 km/h (134 mph)	220 km/h (137 mph)
