= 1939 French Grand Prix =

- Race 2 of 4 in the 1939 European Championship
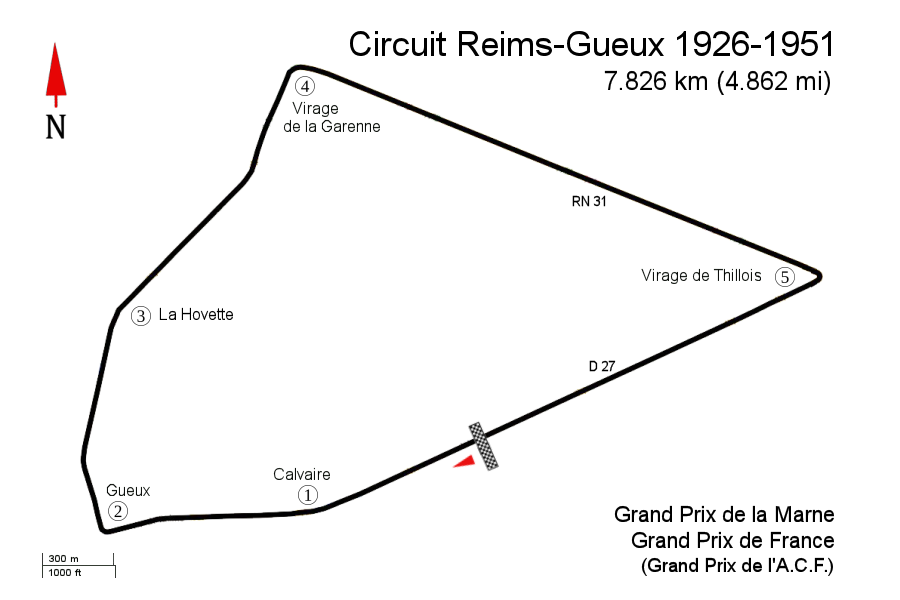

Race details
- Date: 9 July 1939
- Official name: XXXIII Grand Prix de l'Automobile Club de France
- Location: Reims-Gueux; Reims, France
- Course: Road course
- Course length: 7.816 km (4.857 miles)
- Distance: 51 laps, 398.61 km (247.68 miles)
- Weather: Wet, drying. Minor showers.

Pole position
Driver	(Germany) Hermann Lang	Mercedes-Benz
- Time: 2:27.7

Fastest lap
Driver	(Germany) Hermann Lang	Mercedes-Benz
- Time: 2:32.2

Podium
First	(Germany) Hermann Paul Müller	Auto Union
Second	(Germany) Georg Meier	Auto Union
Third	(France) René Le Bègue	Talbot

The 1939 French Grand Prix was a Grand Prix motor race held at Reims-Gueux on 9 July 1939.

== Classification ==
Pos	No	Driver	Team	Car	Laps	Time/Retired	Grid	Points
1	12	(Germany) Hermann Paul Müller	Auto Union	Auto Union D	51	2:21:11.8	5	1
2	14	(Germany) Georg Meier	Auto Union	Auto Union D	50	+1 lap	7	2
3	36	(France) René Le Bègue	Talbot-Darracq	Talbot T26C	48	+3 laps	8	3
4	34	(France) Philippe Étancelin	Talbot-Darracq	Talbot T26C	48	+3 laps	9	4
5	2	(France) Raymond Sommer	Private entry	Alfa Romeo Tipo 308	47	+4 laps	13	4
6	10	(Germany) Hans Stuck	Auto Union	Auto Union D	47	+4 laps	6	4
7	30	(France) René Dreyfus	Ecurie Lucy O'Reilly Schell	Delahaye 145	45	+6 laps	11	4
8	4	(Italy) Luigi Chinetti	Christian Kautz	Alfa Romeo Tipo 308	45	+6 laps	12	4
9	32	(France) "Raph"	Ecurie Lucy O'Reilly Schell	Delahaye 145	44	+7 laps	15	4
Ret	20	(Germany) Hermann Lang	Daimler-Benz AG	Mercedes-Benz W154	36	Engine	1	5
Ret	18	(Germany) Manfred von Brauchitsch	Daimler-Benz AG	Mercedes-Benz W154	17	Engine	4	6
Ret	6	(France) Yves Matra	Christian Kautz	Alfa Romeo Tipo 308	17		14	6
Ret	38	(United Kingdom) Raymond Mays	Talbot-Darracq	Talbot T26C	10	Split tank	10	7
Ret	8	(Italy) Tazio Nuvolari	Auto Union	Auto Union D	8	Gearbox	3	7
Ret	16	(Germany) Rudolf Caracciola	Daimler-Benz AG	Mercedes-Benz W154	1	Accident	2	7

Grand Prix Race
Previous race: 1939 Belgian Grand Prix	1939 Grand Prix season Grandes Épreuves	Next race: 1939 German Grand Prix
Previous race: 1938 French Grand Prix	French Grand Prix	Next race: 1947 French Grand Prix
