= 1939 Belgian Grand Prix =

- Race 1 of 4 in the 1939 European Championship
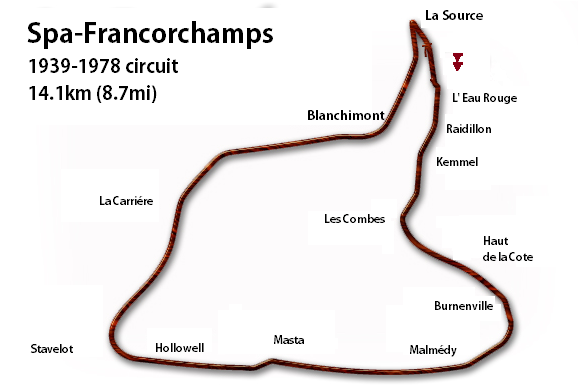

Race details
- Date: 25 June 1939
- Official name: VIII Grand Prix de Belgique
- Location: Spa-Francorchamps; Spa, Belgium
- Course: Road course
- Course length: 14.58 km (9.06 miles)
- Distance: 35 laps, 510.30 km (317.08 miles)
- Weather: Heavy rain, intermittent

Pole position
Driver	(Germany) Hermann Paul Müller	Auto Union
- Grid positions set by ballot

Fastest lap
Driver	(Germany) Hermann Lang	Mercedes-Benz
- Time: 5:19.9

Podium
First	(Germany) Hermann Lang	Mercedes-Benz
Second	(Germany) Rudolf Hasse	Auto Union
Third	(Germany) Manfred von Brauchitsch	Mercedes-Benz

The 1939 Belgian Grand Prix was a Grand Prix motor race held on 25 June 1939 at Spa-Francorchamps.

Richard Seaman crashed into a tree between Clubhouse and La Source hairpin, causing the fuel line to break. Fuel rushed over the car and the car caught fire. Seaman couldn't move because his right hand was broken and he was also trapped by his steering wheel. After a minute of futile rescue attempts, a Belgian soldier walked into the blaze and freed Seaman. However, he had suffered burns on sixty percent of the body and Britain's most successful pre-war driver died before midnight.

== Classification ==
Pos	No	Driver	Team	Car	Laps	Time/Retired	Grid	Points
1	22	(Germany) Hermann Lang	Daimler-Benz AG	Mercedes-Benz W154	35	3:20:21.0	2	1
2	8	(Germany) Rudolf Hasse	Auto Union	Auto Union D	35	+16.9	4	2
3	24	(Germany) Manfred von Brauchitsch	Daimler-Benz AG	Mercedes-Benz W154	35	+1:53.0	9	3
4	12	(France) Raymond Sommer	Private entry	Alfa Romeo Tipo 308	33	+2 Laps	10	4
5	14	(France) Robert Mazaud	Private entry	Delahaye T135CS	31	+4 Laps	11	4
6	18	(France) Louis Gérard	Private entry	Delahaye T135CS	30	+5 Laps	12	4
Ret	2	(Italy) Tazio Nuvolari	Auto Union	Auto Union D	28	Accident damage	4	4
Ret	6	(Germany) Hermann Paul Müller	Auto Union	Auto Union D	26	Valve	1	5
Ret	26	(United Kingdom) Richard Seaman	Daimler-Benz AG	Mercedes-Benz W154	21	Fatal accident	5	5
Ret	10	(Italy) Giuseppe Farina	Private entry	Alfa Romeo Tipo 316	20	Supercharger	3	5
Ret	28	(Switzerland) Adolfo Mandirola	Private entry	Maserati 6CM	19	Front Suspension	13	5
Ret	8	(Germany) Georg Meier	Auto Union	Auto Union D	13	Accident	6	6
Ret	20	(Germany) Rudolf Caracciola	Daimler-Benz AG	Mercedes-Benz W154	7	Accident	7	7

Grand Prix Race
Previous race: 1938 Italian Grand Prix	1939 Grand Prix season Grandes Épreuves	Next race: 1939 French Grand Prix
Previous race: 1937 Belgian Grand Prix	Belgian Grand Prix	Next race: 1946 Belgian Grand Prix
