= Auto Union Grand Prix racing engine =

Reciprocating big internal combustion engine

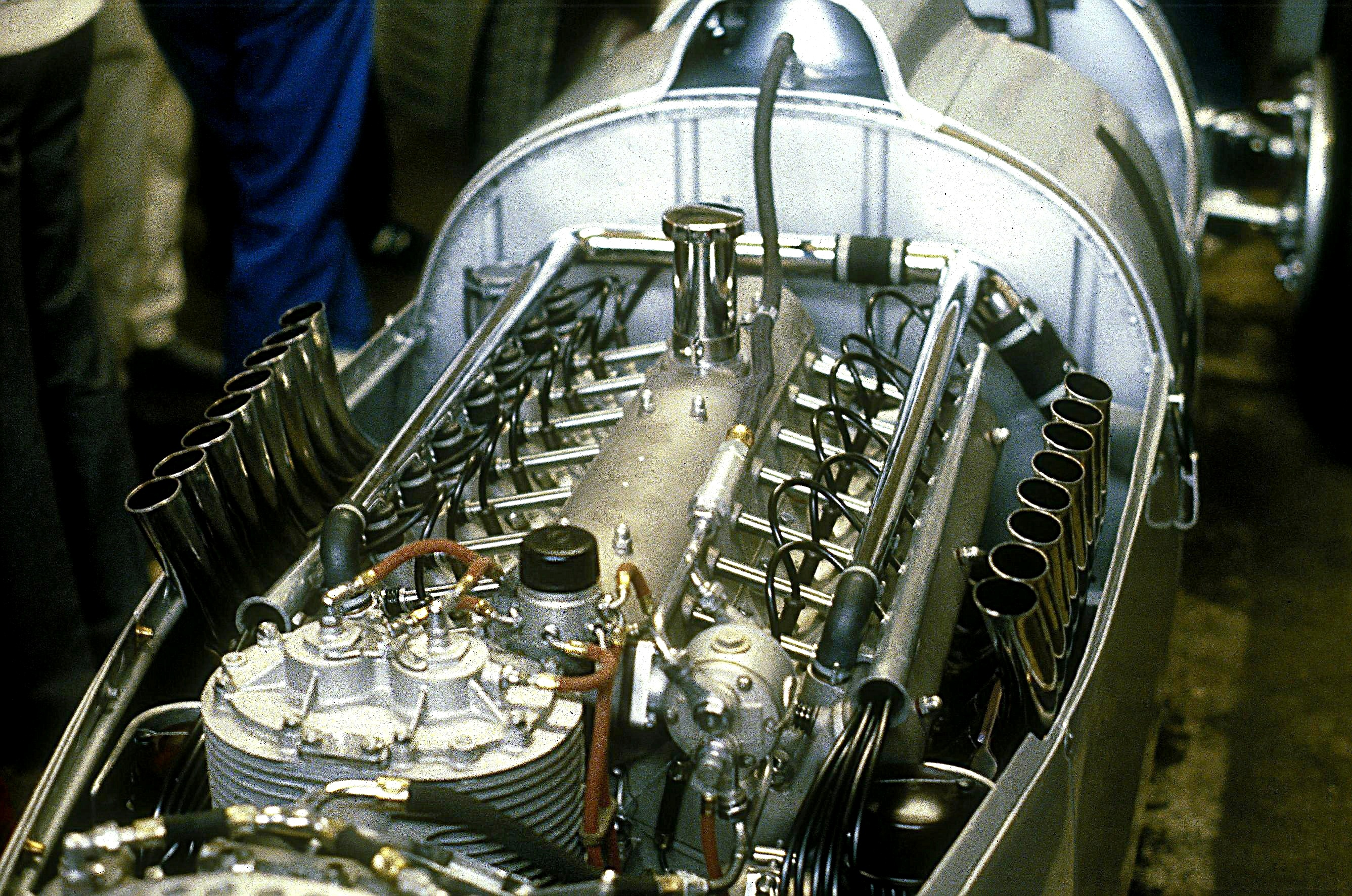

Overview
- Manufacturer: (Germany) Auto Union
- Production: 1934–1939

Layout
- Configuration: 60° V-12; 45° V-16
- Displacement: 3.0 L (2,986 cc); 4.4 L (4,358 cc); 5.0 L (4,954 cc); 6.0 L (6,008 cc)
- Cylinder bore: 65 mm (2.6 in); 68 mm (2.7 in); 72.5 mm (2.9 in); 75 mm (3.0 in)
- Piston stroke: 75 mm (3.0 in); 85 mm (3.3 in)
- Valvetrain: 48-valve to 64-valve, DOHC, four-valves per cylinder
- Compression ratio: 9.2:1

Combustion
- Supercharger: Yes
- Fuel system: Carburetor
- Oil system: Dry sump

Output
- Power output: 291–620 hp (217–462 kW)
- Torque output: 391–651 lb⋅ft (530–883 N⋅m)

Auto Union, a German automobile manufacturer, made a series of pre-war supercharged Grand Prix racing engines for their Auto Union racing cars; between 1934 and 1939.

== Overview ==
Of the four Auto Union racing cars; the Types A, B, and C, which were used from 1934 to 1937, had supercharged V16 engines, and the final car, the Type D used in 1938 and 1939 (built to new 1938 regulations), had a supercharged 3L V12 that developed almost 550 horsepower.

The rear mid-engine, rear-wheel-drive layout was unusual at the time. From front to rear the layout comprised radiator, driver, fuel tank, and engine. The layout would return to Grand Prix racing in the late 1950s by British manufacturer Cooper Car Company.

The problem with the early mid-engined design was the stiffness of the contemporary ladder chassis and suspension. The car's turning angle changed as the momentum of the centrally mounted engine increased on the chassis, causing oversteer. All Auto Unions had independent suspension, with parallel trailing arms and torsion bars at the front. At the rear, Porsche tried to counter the tendency to oversteer by using a then-advanced swing axle suspension on the early cars. On the later Type D, rear suspension was a de Dion system, following the lead of Mercedes-Benz, but the supercharged engines eventually produced almost 550 horsepower.

The original Porsche-designed V16 was modified as a V12 when in 1938 the Grand Prix regulations set a limit of 3 litres on supercharged engines. Originally designed as a 6-litre, the first Auto Union engines displaced 4,360 cc and developed 295 bhp (220 kW). They had two cylinder blocks, inclined at an angle of 45 degrees, with a single overhead camshaft to operate all 32 valves. The intake valves in the hemispherical cylinder heads were connected to the camshaft by rocker arms, while for the exhaust valves the rocker arms were connected to the camshaft by pushrods that passed through tubes situated above the spark plugs; thus the engine had three valve covers. The engine provided optimum torque at low engine speeds, and Bernd Rosemeyer later drove an Auto Union around the Nürburgring in a single gear to prove the engine's flexibility. The chassis tubes originally piped coolant from the radiator to the engine, but this was eventually abandoned owing to leaks.

Auto Union used a clockwork mechanism and a paper disc to record data such as engine revs while the car was being tested, allowing the engineers to study the collected data at a later date. It was found that additional work was needed on the car's cornering behaviour, as accelerating out of a corner would cause the inside rear wheel to spin furiously. This was much abated by the use of a Porsche innovation, limited-slip differential, manufactured by ZF, which was introduced at the end of the 1935 season.

Co-operation between Porsche and Auto Union continued through the Types A, B, and C, until the 750 kg (1,650 lb) formula ended in 1937, as engineering developments had resulted in engines producing great horsepower in lightweight vehicles, and hence high speeds and excessive accidents. Dr. Ing. Robert Eberan von Eberhorst was responsible for the new Type D engine, and was also restricted capacity to 3 litres with a supercharger, or 4.5 litres without. The Type D employed a 12-cylinder engine, while the Hillclimb versions, where the capacity limit was not enforced, used a different gearbox and final drive to retain the 16-cylinder engine of the Type C.

In 1935, the engine had been enlarged to five litres displacement, producing 370 bhp (280 kW). For 1936, the engine had grown to the full 6 litres, and was now producing 620 bhp (460 kW); and reaching 258 mph (415 km/h) in the hands of Rosemeyer and his teammates, the Auto Union Type C and its engine dominated the racing world.

== Applications ==
- Auto Union racing cars
