= Gemünden =

Gemünden may refer to several places in Germany:

- Gemünden am Main, a town in Bavaria
- Gemünden (Wohra), a town in Hesse
- Gemünden (Felda), a municipality in Hesse
- Gemünden, Rhein-Hunsrück, a municipality in Rhineland-Palatinate
- Gemünden, Westerwaldkreis, a municipality in Rhineland-Palatinate

== See also ==
- Gemünd
- Gmunden
- Gmund (disambiguation)
