= Belgrade Grand Prix =

- Kalemegdan Park

Race information
- Circuit length: 2.79 km (1.74 miles)
- Race length: 139.55 km (87.00 miles)
- Laps: 50

Last race (1939)

Pole position

Podium
- 1. Tazio Nuvolari; Auto Union; 1:04'03.000

Fastest lap
- 0:01':14.4'

The Belgrade Grand Prix is a former grand prix from the Grand Prix motor racing era - precursor to Formula One. It was held on the streets of Belgrade, the capital of Kingdom of Yugoslavia and Serbia's largest city. Only one championship event was held, on 3 September 1939. This race saw 5 drivers take part - two Mercedes-Benz in their Silver Arrows, two Auto Unions (modern Audi) and a Bugatti, which finished 19 laps down - and was won by Tazio Nuvolari. The Kalemegdan Park circuit is no longer operational.

== Organization ==
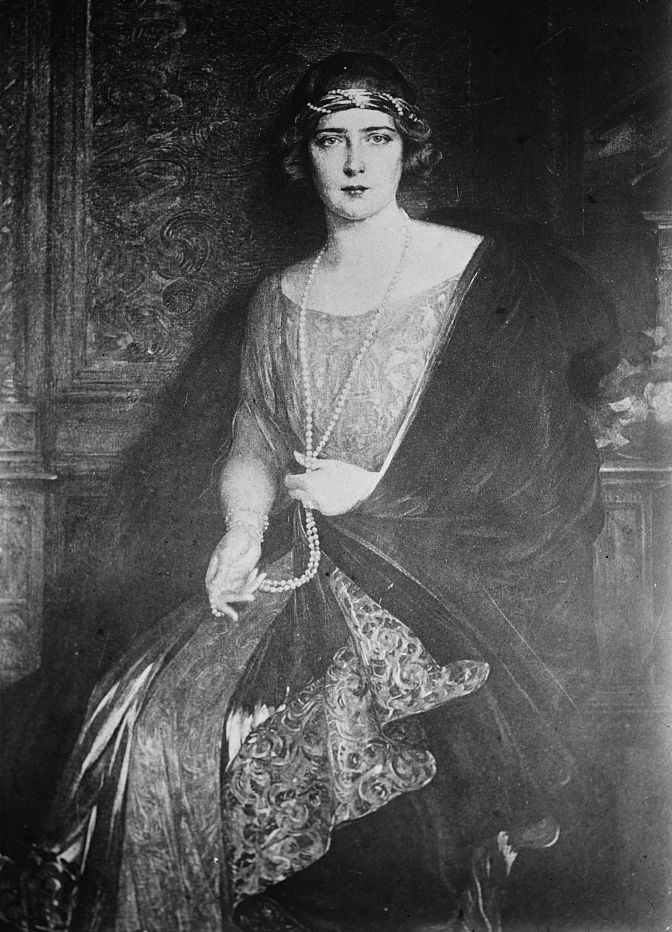
Queen Maria was the patron of the race

The international race was organized on Sunday, 3 September 1939, and was planned as the main event within the scope of the celebration of the 16th birthday of the King of Yugoslavia, Peter II, which was on 6 September. It was organized by the Automobile Club of the Kingdom of Yugoslavia, while the patrons were the Queen mother, Maria and the Politika newspapers. Queen Maria herself was a passionate driver and was often seen driving her Rolls-Royce through Belgrade during the Interbellum. She stopped driving on her own after her husband, King Alexander I of Yugoslavia was assassinated in the car, in 1934 in Marseille.

== Circuit ==
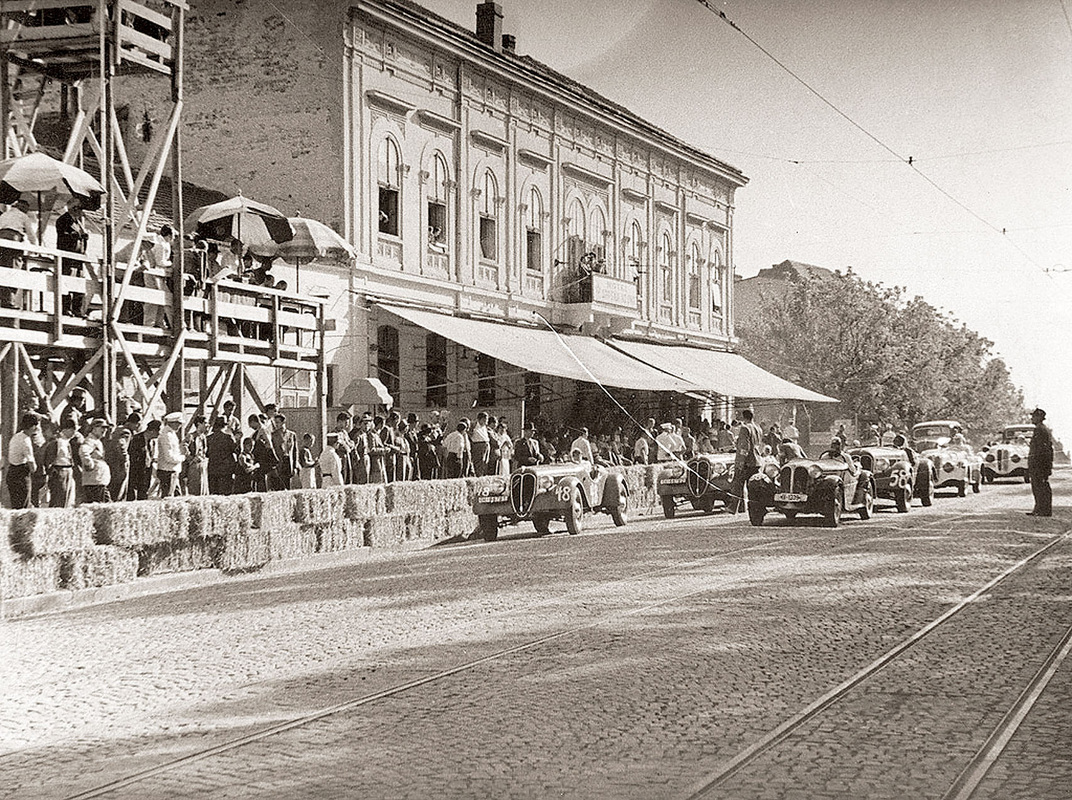
Kafana "Srpska Kruna", starting point of the race

The circuit was set as a round course surrounding the Belgrade Fortress, popularly called Kalemegdan, after the park in the fortress. The start was at the entrance into the Kalemegdan from the Knez Mihailova Street, at the kafana "Srpska Kruna" ("Serbian Crown"), which is today a location of the Belgrade City Library. The cars then went north, down the street of Maršala Pilsudskog (later Tadeuša Košćuška, today Pjarona de Mondezira) to the Dušanova Street in the neighborhood of Dorćol. The course then turned left, next to the Institute for the sewing of the military uniforms (later Beko factory, demolished in the 2010s), and then continued around the Fortress and the Nebojša Tower, along the right bank of the Sava river, constantly swirling to the left. After reaching the beginning section of the Karađorđeva street in the neighborhood of Savamala there was another turn to the left next to the Embassy of France, and then up the Knez Mihailov Venac (today Pariska Street) back to the "Srpska Kruna". First races were shorter, while the final, Grand Prix race, consisted of 50 laps.

The track was considered a challenging one, as it had a hilly section, partially was made of cobblestone and intersected with the tram tracks.

== Races ==
The entire event comprised 8 separate races. First 7 included car races with lesser known drivers in the less powerful automobiles, motorcycle race and a race for motorcycles with a sidecar and a balancer. A balancer's duty was to sit in a sidecar and to prevent the motorcycle from tipping over, by leaning on one side or another when motorcycle runs into the curve in full speed. Reporters wrote that it was on the "edge of suicide". The most important race, Grand Prix, was saved for last.

== Preparations ==
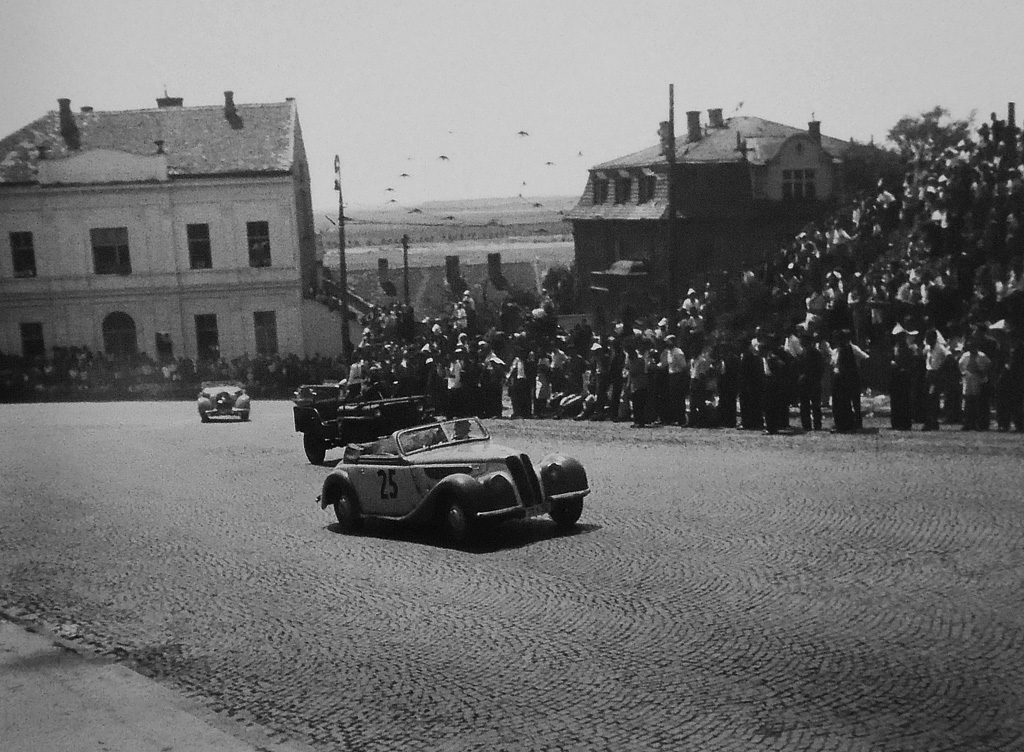
Kalemegdan Section.

At the time, Belgrade had a population of 360,000 and the race attracted 100,000 spectators, so the organization of the event was challenging. At the request from the organizers which wanted as much audience as possible, the railway reduced ticket prices to Belgrade from other parts of Yugoslavia (Niš, Sarajevo, Ljubljana, Split) by 66%. On 26 August, the airplanes flew over larger cities in the entire kingdom (Belgrade, Novi Sad, Zagreb, Skopje, Niš, Sarajevo) throwing pamphlets with invitations for everyone to "use all the benefits and discounts and not to miss the greatest sports event". The post office issued a special series of 4 stamps marking the occasion. The Cvijeta Zuzorić Art Pavilion in Kalemegdan was temporarily adapted into the post office where visitors could buy a special envelopes and stamps, with also special postmarks.

Several grandstands were constructed, near the entrance into the Kalemegdan. Both were stretching downhill, in the direction of Maršala Pilsudskog to the north and Knez Mihailov Venac to the south. Along the almost entire track, 2.7 km (1.7 mi), rooms for the standing spectators were built. The tickets for seating were 10 times higher than those for standing. Due to the great popular interest, one additional grandstand was added. As it was hastily built, to convince the public that it was properly and quality constructed, the organizers summoned 600 soldiers who tested the grandstand.

== Arrivals ==
The contestants began to arrive in the late August 1939. The Belgraders waited for the famous drivers, though they never visited Belgrade, but highly popular journals about them were shown before every show in cinemas. The most popular were Hermann Lang and Manfred von Brauchitsch from Mercedes-Benz and Tazio Nuvolari and Hermann Paul Müller from Auto-Union. Though announced, Nuvolari did not arrive. He was in Italy and the ban on leaving the country due to the international situation was introduced. German authorities intervened with its Italian counterparts, so Nuvolari arrived in Belgrade, being one day late. French and Hungarian teams also arrived, but the rivalry between the two German teams was the main attraction. The journalists besieged the Belgrade hotels ("Pariz", "Moskva") where the drivers stayed. However, the greatest crowd was in front of the "Srpska Kralj" where the team members of Auto-Union were. Starting on 25 August, a members of the German teams travelled in their cars for 1,400 km (870 mi) from Germany to Belgrade, having their own tank trucks with them. The drivers from United Kingdom didn't arrive because of the safety concerns while, due to the ban on leaving Italy, Alfa Romeo and Maserati were also absent.

== Test drives ==
On 31 August the first test drive was held. During the second lap, a tire exploded on the car of the Serbian driver Lazar Radić. The explosion blocked the wheel and the car got off the track, hitting the black locust tree and cutting it in half. The car was badly damaged, but none of the spectators were hurt, while Radić had only few scratches.

During the second test drive, on 1 September 1939, Germany attacked Poland. After the news reached Belgrade, French and Hungarian drivers withdrew, while German teams continued as if nothing happened.

== Pre-program ==
The crowd gathered from the early morning on 3 September. The guards and police officers removed people from the streets while special inspections were controlling the quality and the prices of the food and drink stands. Pre-program included 4 car and 3 motorcycle races. Race for the motorcycles with the engine displacement of over 3 L (0.66 imp gal; 0.79 US gal) was very popular.

During the races, the news of United Kingdom and France declaring a war on Germany arrived. Alfred Neubauer, the manager of Mercedes-Benz Grand Prix team, came from the German embassy and told the drivers to relax and continue with the preparations for the race. However, showing his patriotism, von Brauchitsch left the venue and went to the airport to leave Belgrade. Lang notified Neubauer, who got furious. He jumped into his car and driving frantically across the city, he arrived at the airport in Bežanija where von Brauchitsch was already boarding in the Lufthansa's plane. Neubauer talked von Brauchitsch to return to the race telling him, among other things: "If you wish war, you can wait for a few hours".

== Grand Prix ==
1939 Belgrade City Race
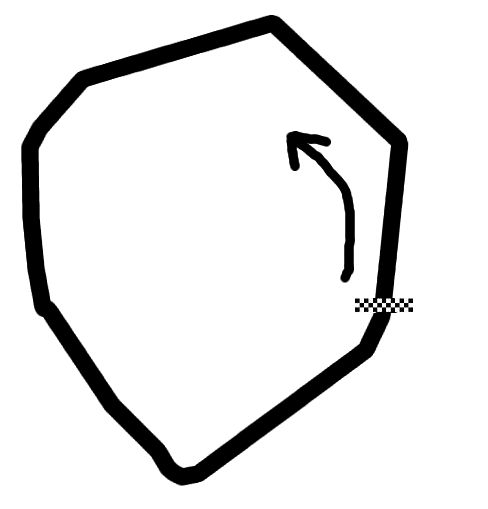

Race details
- Date: 3 September 1939
- Official name: I Belgrade City Race
- Location: Kalemegdan Park; Belgrade, Kingdom of Yugoslavia
- Course: Road circuit
- Course length: 2.790 km (1.734 miles)
- Distance: 50 laps, 139.50 km (86.68 miles)
- Weather: Sunny, hot

Pole position
Driver	(Germany) Manfred von Brauchitsch	Mercedes-Benz
- Time: 1:14.2
- Grid positions set by heat results

Fastest lap
Drivers	(Italy) Tazio Nuvolari	Auto Union
	(Germany) Manfred von Brauchitsch	Mercedes-Benz
- Time: 1:14.0

Podium
First	(Italy) Tazio Nuvolari	Auto Union
Second	(Germany) Manfred von Brauchitsch	Mercedes-Benz
Third	(Germany) Hermann Paul Müller	Auto Union

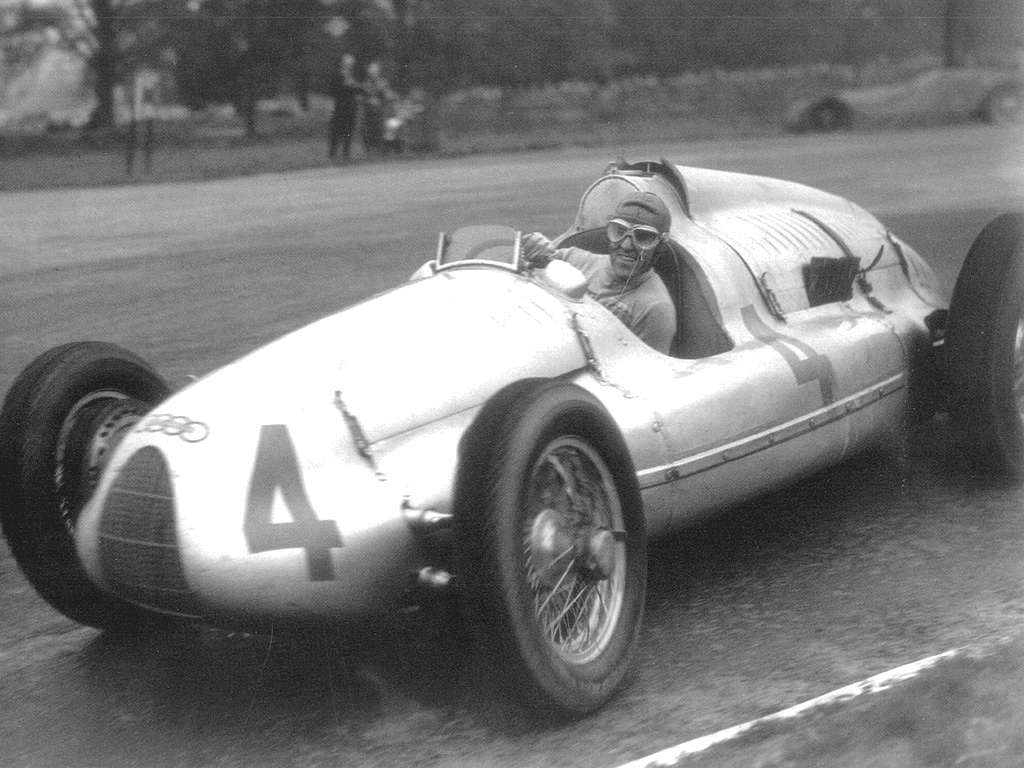
Tazio Nuvolari, winner of the race

As French and Hungarian teams withdrew, only the two German teams, with their "silver cars" and four drivers, participated in the race. They were joined by the local dandy, Boško Milenović, in the blue Bugatti Type 51.

The race began at 16:45. The average speed was 136 km/h (85 mph). However, racing next to the Nebojša Tower, Nuvolari exceeded the speed of 200 km/h (120 mph). Especially attractive was the Knez Mihailova Street section. As it was the highest point of the track, running fast up the hill the cars would literally fly for almost 10 m (33 ft) over the spot and immediately continue going downhill. During the race, a rock bounced from below the von Brauchitsch's car, hitting the goggles of his teammate Lang, breaking them, so Lang retired from the race. He was replaced with Walter Bäumer but he soon went off the road into the grove of the poplar trees near the Nebojša Tower. Bäumer was unharmed. At the final bend (French embassy) in the 16th lap, von Brauchitsch lost control on the polished cobblestone, the car positioned crosswise and shut down. Seemingly out of nowhere, Nuvolari appeared barely missing von Brauchitsch's car. Due to the hot weather and the substrates of the streets which made the course, which was not suited for the races, almost all participants had tire problems.

Nuvolari won the race with 1:04:03, von Brauchitsch was 7.6 seconds behind him and the press described him as the "eternally second", Müller was third and 31.6 seconds late while Milenović finished fourth, albeit being 19 laps behind.

=== Classification ===
Pos	No	Driver	Team	Car	Laps	Time/Retired	Grid
1	4	(Italy) Tazio Nuvolari	Auto Union	Auto Union D	50	1:04:03.8	5
2	6	(Germany) Manfred von Brauchitsch	Mercedes-Benz	Mercedes-Benz W154	50	+ 7.6s	1
3	8	(Germany) Hermann Paul Müller	Auto Union	Auto Union D	50	+ 31.6s	3
4	12	(Kingdom of Yugoslavia) Boško Milenković	Private participant	Bugatti T51	31	+19 laps	4
Ret	2	(Germany) Hermann Lang (Germany) Walter Bäumer	Mercedes-Benz	Mercedes-Benz W154	17	Accident	2
DNS	4	(Germany) Ulrich Bigalke	Auto Union	Auto Union D			
DNS	8	(Germany) Hans Stuck	Auto Union	Auto Union D			
DNS	10	(Germany) Walter Bäumer	Mercedes-Benz	Mercedes-Benz W154			

== Assessment ==
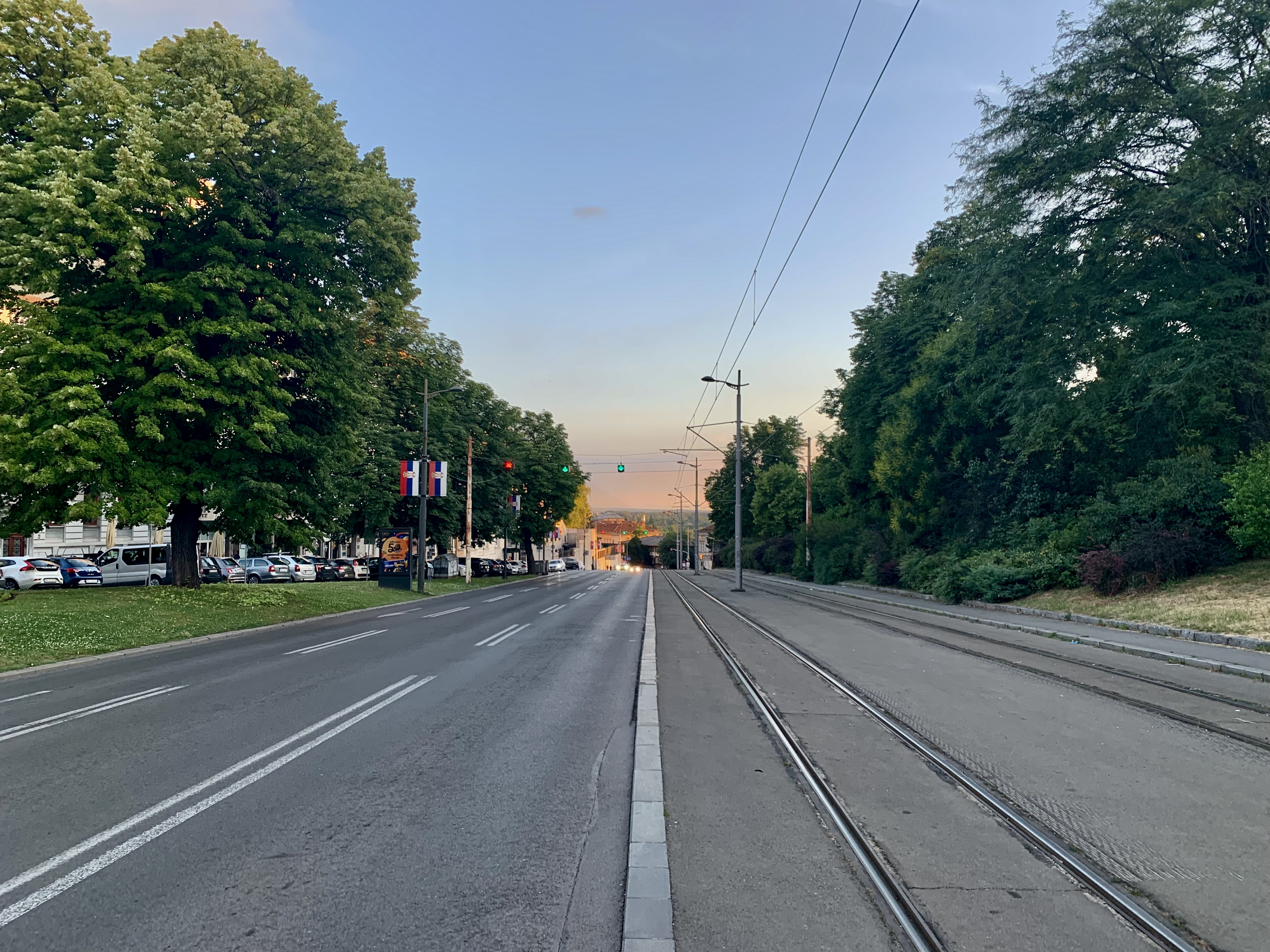
Pjarona De Mondezira, Belgrade, 2026: part of the track just past the start/finish line

The 1939 Belgrade Grand Prix holds several distinctions. As the World War II began two days prior to the race, it is the only Grand Prix race held on the European soil during the war. It is the only race of that class ever held in Belgrade. It is also significant for being the very last major win of the great Tazio Nuvolari's illustrious career (he won 1946 Albi Grand Prix). He was 46 at the time.

After the war, the new Communist authorities did their best to erase this race event from collective national memory. The problems with the event included the general feel of the new system that car racing is the elitist fun opposed to the lives of the working class, a fact that all participants came from the Axis powers but mostly, as the young King Peter II was in the organization, because it would show the dethroned Serbian king in good historical light.

On 3 September 2023, the commemorative recreation of the event was organized by the Serbian government and the Italian embassy in Belgrade. 20 classic cars from Serbia, Italy and Slovenia participated, either from museums or public collections. They made three laps around the original route, and then continued to parade through Belgrade itself. In the end, they were exhibited in front of the City Assembly.
