= Gmund =

Gmund, Gmünd or Gmuend (cf. German: Mündung, "(river) mouth") may refer to the following places:

- Schwäbisch Gmünd, a town in Baden-Württemberg, Germany
- Gmund am Tegernsee, a municipality in Bavaria, Germany
- Gmünd, Carinthia, Austria
- Gmünd, Lower Austria, Austria, capital city of
  - Gmünd District, Lower Austria, Austria

== See also ==
- Gemünd
- Gmunden
- Gemünden (disambiguation)
