= Robert Eberan von Eberhorst =

Austrian engineer (1902–1982)

Robert Eberan-Eberhorst
- Born: Robert Eberan von Eberhorst; 23 October 1902; Austria
- Died: 14 March 1982
- Engineering career
- Discipline: Automotive engineering
- Institutions: Vienna Technical University; Dresden Technical University; Auto Union, Cisitalia; English Racing Automobiles, Aston Martin, Battelle Institute, Vienna University
- Employers: Auto Union, Cisitalia, English Racing Automobiles, Aston Martin, Battelle Institute, Vienna University
- Projects: Auto Union Type D, Porsche 356 (initial work), ERA 'G' Type, Jowett Jupiter (chassis), Aston Martin DB3, Tiger tank (design involvement), V1/V2 rockets (initial testing)
- Significant design: Auto Union Type D Grand Prix car
- Significant advance: Early experiments with ground effect downforce, theoretical work on car handling ("Roll Angles")

Robert Eberan von Eberhorst (23 October 1902 – 14 March 1982), later known as Robert Eberan-Eberhorst, was a noted Austrian engineer, who designed the Auto Union Type D Grand Prix motor racing car.

== Early life ==
Born into Austrian nobility, the family shortened its name when the nobility was abolished in Austria in 1918. He studied at the Vienna Technical University until in 1927, where he earned an engineering master's degree. Later that year he joined the Institute for Automotive Engineering at Dresden Technical University as a research assistant and PhD candidate. In 1933 Ferdinand Porsche persuaded him to join Auto Union.

== Auto Union ==
Eberan-Eberhorst initially served as a development engineer within the Auto Union racing department at Horch works in Zwickau, moving to head up the racing engine department. He was responsible for turning Chief Engineer Porsche's ideas in physical reality, and his early contributions to Auto Union's successes included development of side skirts and aerodynamic bodywork along the belly of the record breaking streamliner car, additions that were some of the earliest experiments with ground effect downforce to have been applied to a car.

=== Type D ===
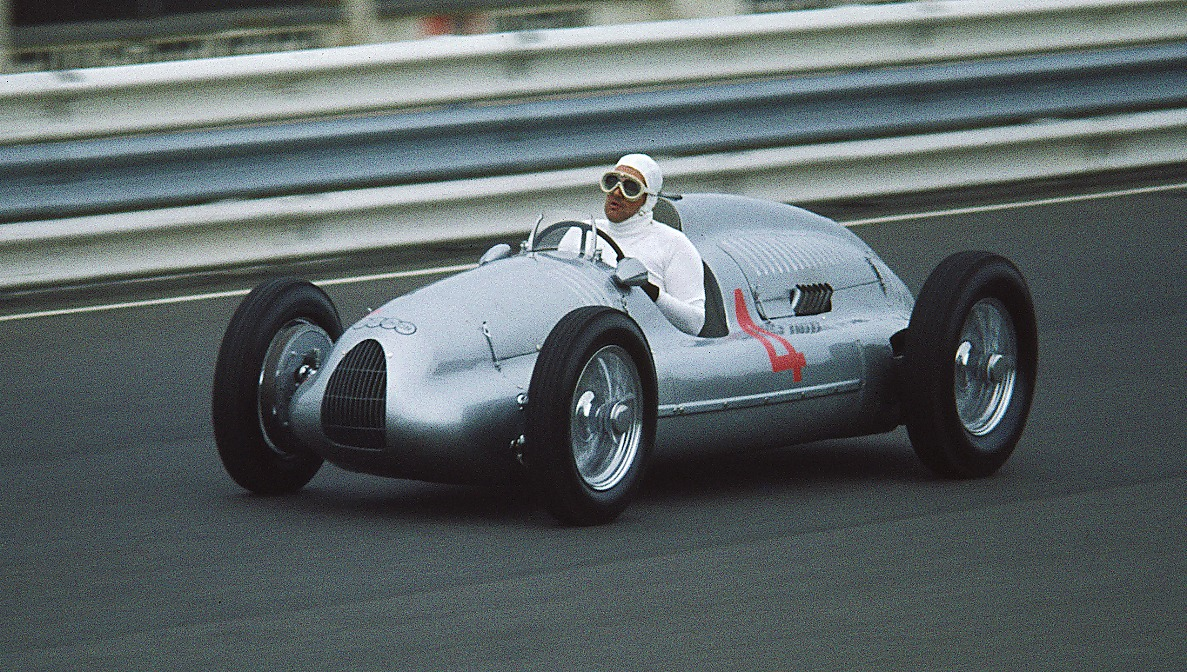
Auto Union Type D

When Porsche left Auto Union in 1938 Eberan-Eberhorst was promoted in his stead. His first full car design was for the Auto Union Type D Grand Prix car. With a swept volume of three litres, in accordance with the contemporary Grand Prix regulations, the supercharged V12 mid-mounted engine could develop 400 bhp (300 kW). Chassis modifications were made aimed at improving the drivability of the car by mass distribution (revised driver and fuel tank position), and a new de Dion rear suspension replacing the previous swing axle system. The car provided Grand Prix victories for Tazio Nuvolari and Hermann Paul Müller.

Eberan-Eberhorst was heavily involved in the initial testing of each new racing car, developing an on-board recording instrument to plot parameters such as car speed, engine speed, gear change and braking points.

== World War II ==
He gained his doctorate in 1940 and from 1941 was appointed to a full professorship at Dresden Technical University. During World War II he was involved in the design of the Tiger tank, initial testing of the V1/V2 rockets, and provided much research data on improving fuel consumption.

== After World War II ==
At the conclusion of World War II Eberan-Eberhorst fled Dresden, in the Soviet-occupied sector of defeated Germany. In 1947, in an old sawmill in Gmünd, Austria, Ferdinand Porsche's son Ferry and Eberan-Eberhorst started work on project 356, which evolved into the famous Porsche 356 sports car.

Later, the Italian Piero Dusio decided to build racing cars at his Cisitalia works in Turin, bringing in the engineers Dante Giacosa and Giovanni Savonuzzi from Fiat and Piero Taruffi to manage the racing team. When the team decided to enter Grand Prix competition, Carlo Abarth and Robert Eberan-Eberhorst were also recruited. This project went sour when the designers proposed a flat 12 four-cam engine with the possibility of supercharging and even four-wheel drive plus Eberhorst's usual requirements for proper jigs, test-beds and tooling; his view was that races are better lost on the test-beds then they can be won on the tracks.

Eberhorst was by now recognised as one of the world's premier racing car design theorists, so in 1949 he moved to Dunstable in the UK, where he worked for English Racing Automobiles designing the chassis for the 1952 Bristol engined 'G' type grand prix car, and on the Jowett Jupiter chassis. In 1950, he moved to Aston Martin to design a pure sports-racing car, the DB3, his brief being to produce a car that would be quick enough to give the 2.6-litre straight six a chance of outright wins. Whilst at Aston Martin, Eberhorst published an article in The Automobile Engineer entitled "Roll Angles". This theoretical study followed Maurice Olley's paper "Road Manners of the Modern Car" and established ex-Rolls-Royce engineer Olley and Eberhorst as two of only a handful of engineers capable of mathematically defining the essential factors in car handling. Eberhorst's contribution was to show how the several constants in Olley's complex equations could be established experimentally.

In 1953 Eberhorst returned to Germany as General Manager for Technical Development at a reviving Auto Union. In 1956 he moved to the Battelle Institute in Frankfurt as Head of Mechanical Engineering and four years later he took over responsibility for the Combustion Engines and Automotive Engineering Institute at Vienna University. He retired from there in 1965 although continuing to write important technical papers.
