= Crosthwaite & Gardiner =

- Type: Private
- Industry: building, restoring, maintaining and optimising vintage race cars
- Founded: 1969
- Website: https://crosthwaiteandgardiner.com/

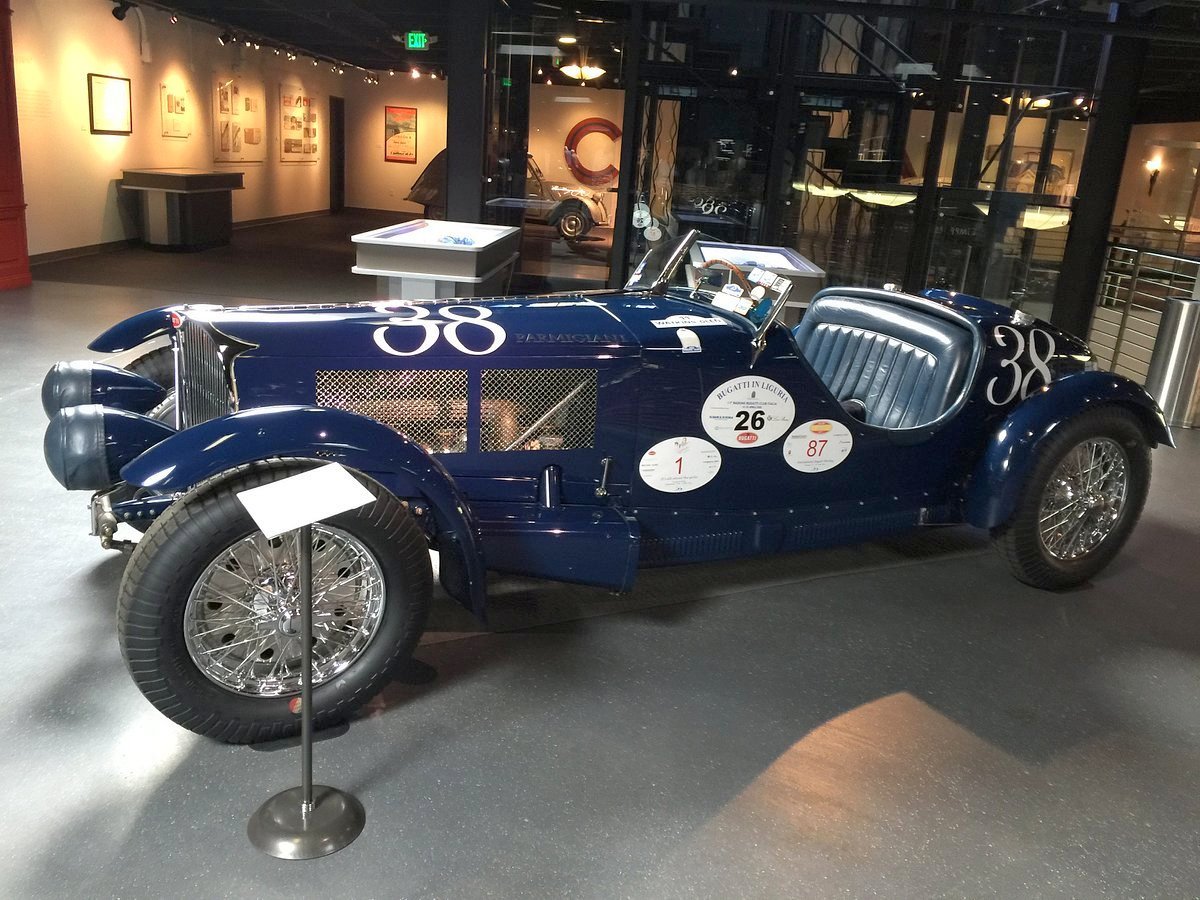
Bugatti Type 57 SC bodied as a competition roadster by Crosthwaite & Gardiner in 1936 (chassis 57-492).

Crosthwaite & Gardiner is a British historic racing car restoration company founded in 1969 in East Sussex by mechanic Dick Crosthwaite and restoration engineer John Gardiner. They started out building, restoring, maintaining and optimising Bugatti race cars, but over time they have built a reputation and competence for all kinds of vintage race cars, for full restorations and for custom parts.

== Notable cooperations ==
Due to their extensive competence Crosthwaite & Gardiner have been appointed to restore vintage Silver Arrows by Mercedes-Benz, like the 1939 Mercedes-Benz W154, and Audi, like the 1939 Auto Union Type D Grand Prix model, and also vintage racers by Bugatti, Maserati Birdcage and Jaguar E-type. In addition they have built replicas of I.e Dymaxion car for Norman Foster, and Auto Union Schnellsportwagen and Auto Union Lucca by Audi.
