= Walter Bäumer =

German racing driver (1908–1941)

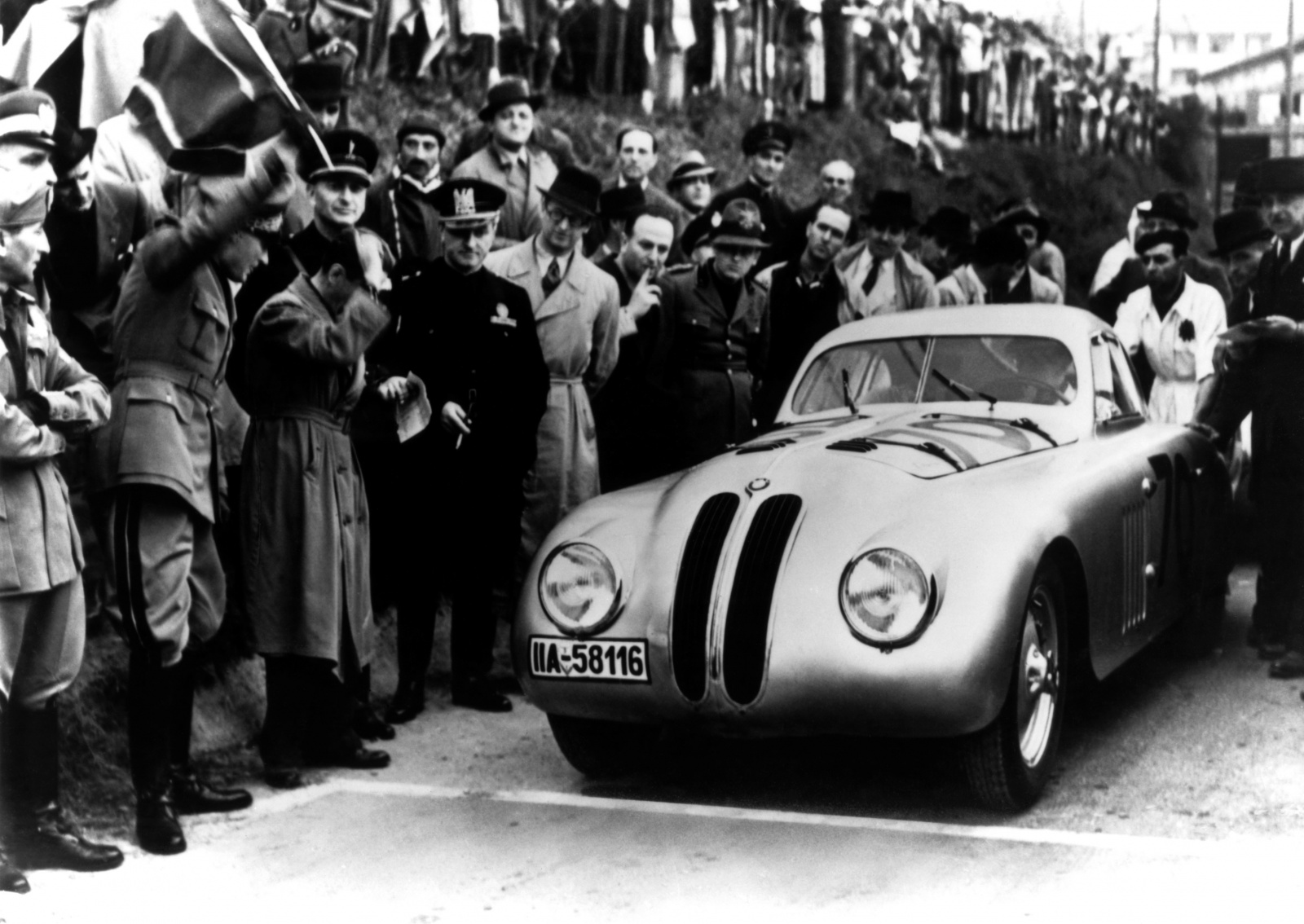
- von Hanstein and Bäumer's BMW 328 at the 1940 Mille Miglia
- Born: Walter Bäumer; 17 October 1908 Bünde, Germany
- Died: 30 June 1941 (aged 32) Herford, Germany

Walter Bäumer (17 October 1908 – 30 June 1941) was a German racing driver, whose greatest triumph was sharing the winning car in the 1940 Mille Miglia.

== Career ==
While completing a commercial apprenticeship, in 1928 Bäumer began to enter motorcycle races on an NSU. After an accident, he turned to racing on four wheels, originally in Dixi and BMW sportscars. and in the mid-thirties in an Austin, primarily in hillclimbing. Between 1937 and 1939 he was a reserve driver for the Mercedes Grand Prix team, but he only appeared in four Grande Epreuves, two of which were events in the AIACR European Championship.

The only one he started was the 1938 Donington Grand Prix, in which he ran sixth towards the end, only for an engine fire to cause his retirement. His only finish was 10th at the 1938 Swiss Grand Prix, sharing with Hermann Lang, whose car he had also taken over in the German Grand Prix. He was a reserve in the 1939 Belgrade Grand Prix, held after the start of the Second World War, and replaced an injured Lang, but soon crashed.

Bäumer, like most German racing drivers, was a member of the NSKK, and joined the NSDAP in June 1937. After the war started he was placed in the NSKK driving pool, probably in occupied France.

In 1940, he was ordered to take part in the Mille Miglia (given the title of Gran Premio de Brescia della Mille Miglia, as, instead of being a single 1,000 mile lap of central Italy, the war reduced the event to 9 laps of 100 miles), sharing a BMW 328 Touring-Coupé with SS member Fritz Huschke von Hanstein. Bäumer drove the last 3 laps to secure the victory.

== Death ==
Bäumer died in a car crash on Salzufer Street in Herford in the early hours of the morning of 30 June 1941, thrown out of his Tatra when losing control after being kissed by his girlfriend.

== Results ==
=== Grands Prix ===
(key)

Year	Entrant	Chassis	Engine	1	2	3	4	5
1937	Daimler-Benz AG	Mercedes W125	Mercedes 5.7 L8	BEL –	GER reserve	MON –	SUI –	ITA –
1938	Daimler-Benz AG	Mercedes W154	Mercedes 3.0 V12	FRA –	GER; Ret	SUI; 10	'ITA –	
1939	Daimler-Benz AG	Mercedes W154	Mercedes 3.0 V12	BEL –	FRA reserve	GER –	SUI –	
