= Gemünd =

- Municipality
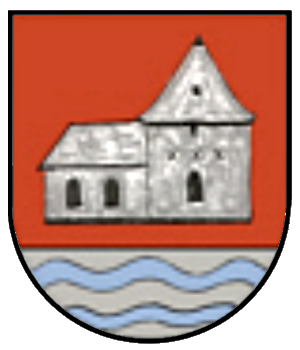
- Coat of arms

- Location of Gemünd within Eifelkreis Bitburg-Prüm district
- Interactive map of Gemünd
- Location within Germany Location within Rhineland-Palatinate
- Coordinates: 49°59′18″N 06°09′38″E
- Country: Germany
- State: Rhineland-Palatinate
- District: Eifelkreis Bitburg-Prüm
- Municipal assoc.: Südeifel

Government
  - Mayor (2019–24): Stephanie Weiler

Area
  - Total: 2.83 km^{2} (1.09 sq mi)
- Elevation: 237 m (778 ft)

Population (2025-12-31)
  - Total: 41
  - Density: 14/km^{2} (38/sq mi)
- Time zone: UTC+01:00 (CET)
  - Summer (DST): UTC+02:00 (CEST)
- Postal codes: 54673
- Dialling codes: 06524
- Vehicle registration: BIT
- Website: Gemünd at site www.suedeifelinfo.de

Gemünd is a municipality in the district of Bitburg-Prüm, in Rhineland-Palatinate, western Germany.

== History ==
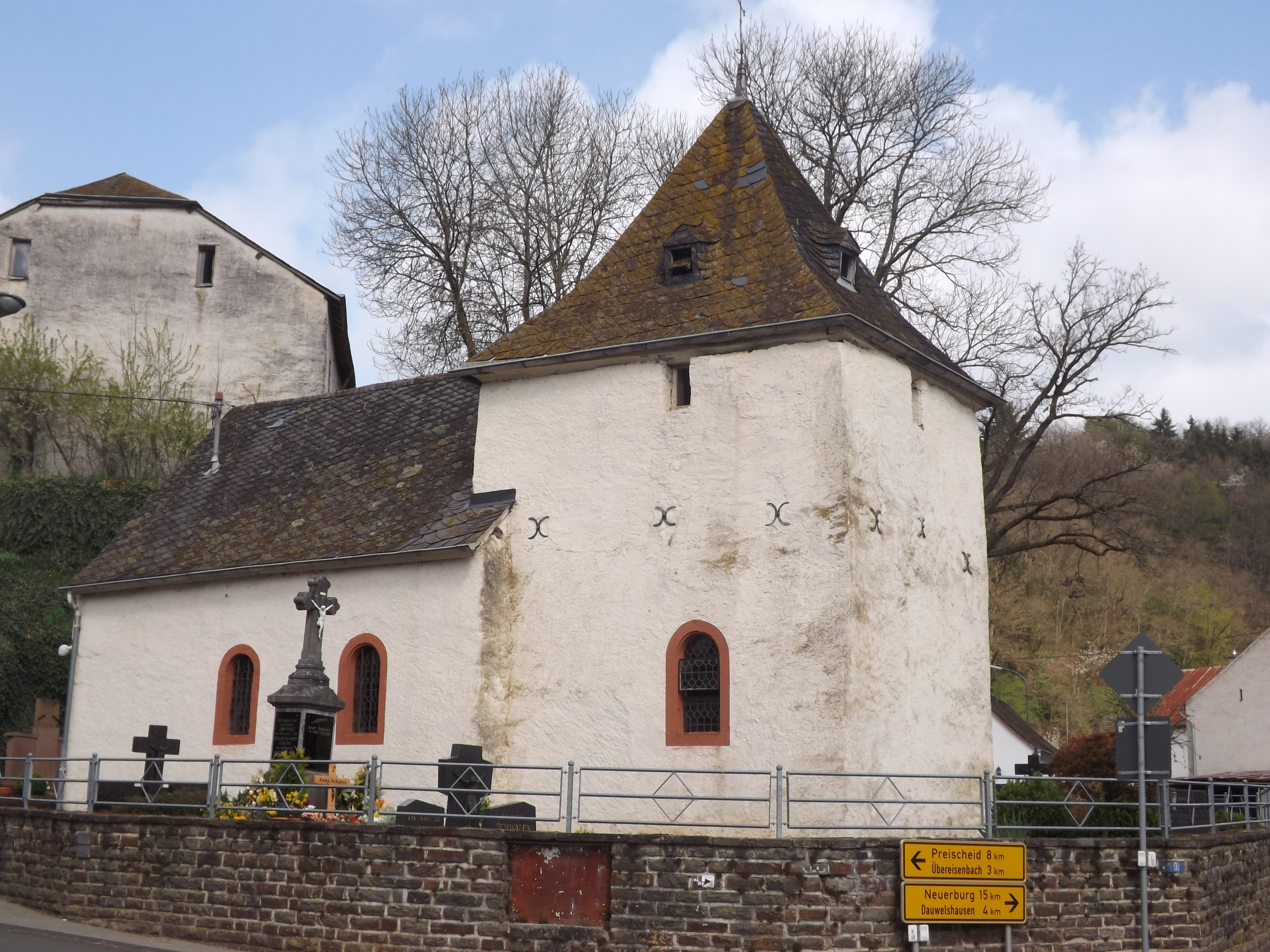
Exterior view of the church

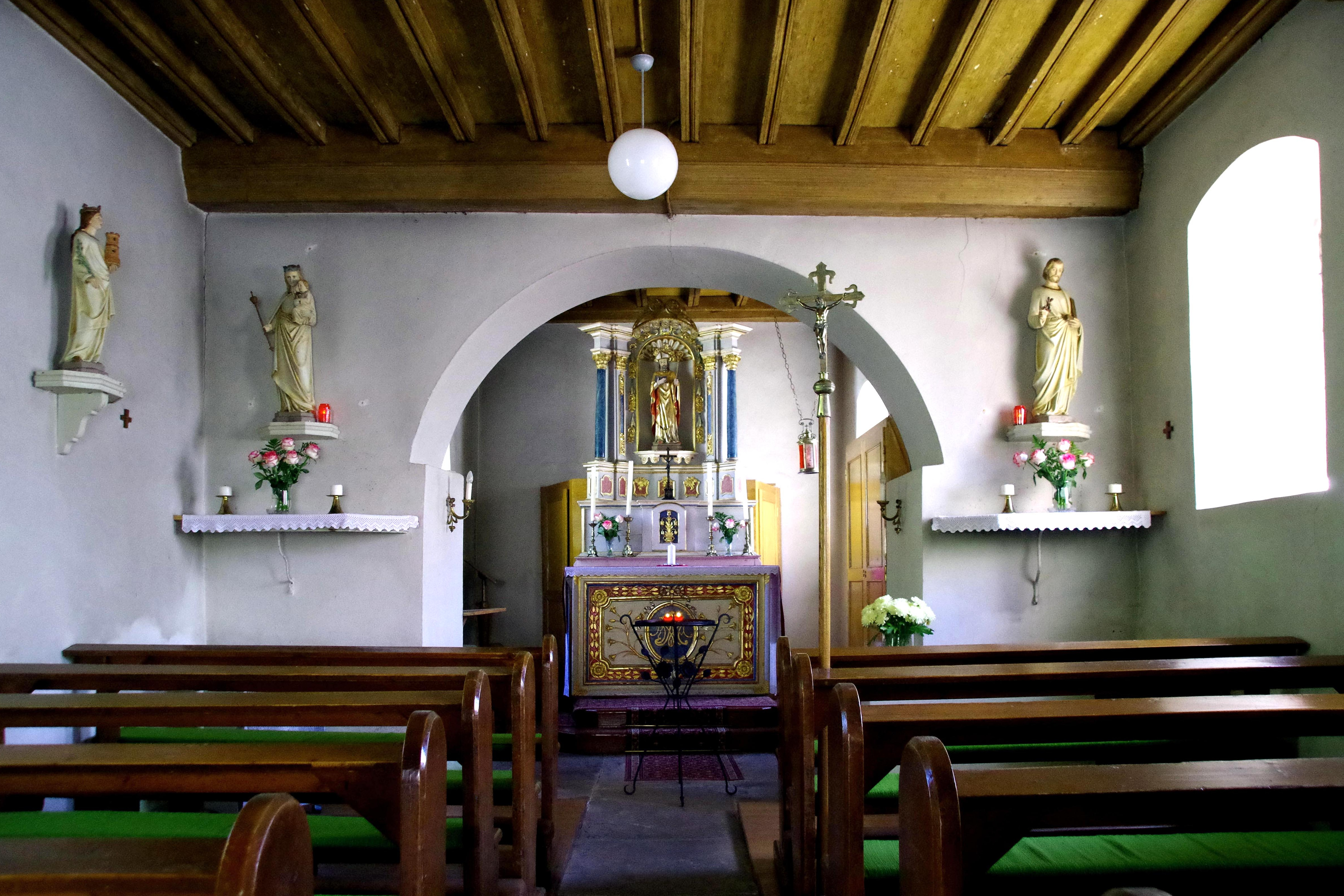
Interior

The community's church, dedicated to St. Servatius, was first mentioned in 1563, with the associated town being called Gemun.
