= 1936 Grand Prix season =

Fourth AIACR European Championship season

1936 AIACR European Championship season

Seasons
- ← 1935 1937 →

1936 Grand Prix season

Seasons
- ← 1935 1937 →

The 1936 season was the third year of the 750 kg Formula. It was defined by intense engineering developments and the overwhelming dominance of the Auto Union team. The next iteration of the Mercedes-Benz did not prove successful and the team withdrew during the season to instead prepare for the next one. It therefore fell to the resurgent Auto Union team to dominate the racing. In particular, it was their young, new superstar, Bernd Rosemeyer, who mastered the tricky car and who showed superlative skill in wet conditions. Rosemeyer easily won this season's European Championship by winning three of the four Grands Prix.

Once again, it was the old master, Tazio Nuvolari, driving the new Alfa Romeo for the Scuderia Ferrari who proved the greatest challenger to the all-conquering German cars. Without competitive cars, and not wanting to suffer further humiliation from the German teams, the French racing authorities instead ran their major races to their own new sports car regulations. With tensions in Europe rising, politics was increasingly playing a major part in motor-racing. Benito Mussolini ordered Italian teams to boycott the early races in the season, and the Belgian Grand Prix was cancelled. Strikes forced the Le Mans 24 Hours to be postponed, then cancelled, and when Spain erupted into civil war later in the year, racing ceased there.

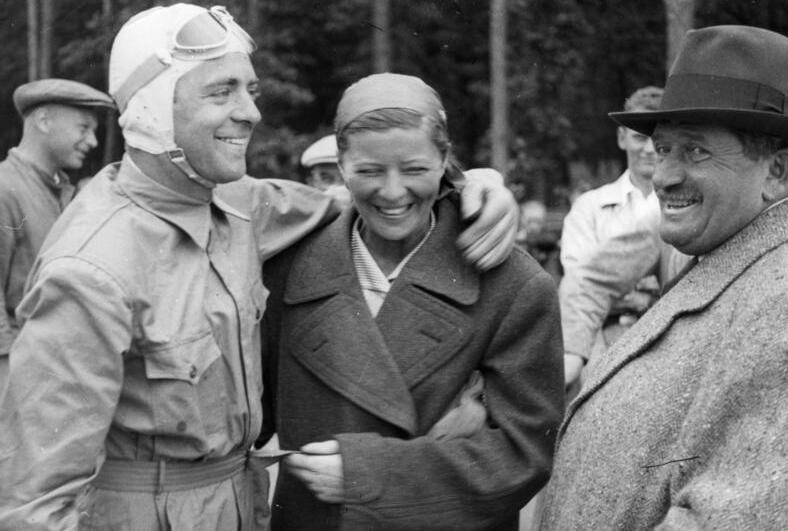
European Champion Bernd Rosemeyer, with his wife Elly Beinhorn and Dr Ferdinand Porsche

== European Championship Grands Prix ==
| | Date | Name | Circuit | Race Regulations | Weather | Race Distance | Winner's Time | Winning driver | Winning constructor | Fastest lap | Report |
|---|---|---|---|---|---|---|---|---|---|---|---|
| 1 | 13 Apr | VIII Grand Prix de Monaco | Monte Carlo | AIACR | intermittent rain | 320 km | 3h 49m | (Germany) Rudolf Caracciola | Mercedes-Benz W25K | Hans Stuck; Auto Union | Report |
| | 28 Jun | (France) XXX Grand Prix de l’ACF | Montlhéry | sports | ? | 1000 km | 7h 59 m | (France) Jean-Pierre Wimille (France) Raymond Sommer | Bugatti Type 57G | | Report |
| | 7 Jul | (Belgium) Belgian Grand Prix | Spa-Francorchamps | | | | | cancelled | | | |
| 2 | 26 Jul | (Germany) IX Grosser Preis von Deutschland | Nürburgring | AIACR | cool | 500 km | 3h 49m | (Germany) Bernd Rosemeyer | Auto Union Type C | Bernd Rosemeyer; Auto Union | Report |
| 3 | 23 Aug | (Switzerland) III Grosser Preis der Schweiz | Bremgarten | AIACR | sunny | 510 km | 3h 09m | (Germany) Bernd Rosemeyer | Auto Union Type C | Bernd Rosemeyer; Auto Union | Report |
| 4 | 13 Sep | (Italy) XIV Gran Premio d’Italia | Monza | AIACR | sunny | 500 km | 3h 43m | (Germany) Bernd Rosemeyer | Auto Union Type C | Bernd Rosemeyer; Auto Union | Report |
| | 20 Sep | (Spain) Gran Premio de España | Lasarte | | | | | cancelled | | | |

A pink background indicates the race was run for Sports Cars or Touring Cars, while a grey background indicates the race was not held this year. Sources:

== Major Non-championship Races ==
Multiple classes are mentioned when they were divided and run to different race lengths. It only includes races over 50 km and/or half-hour in duration

| | Date | Name | Circuit | Race Regulations | Weather | Race Distance | Winner's Time | Winning driver | Winning constructor | Report |
|---|---|---|---|---|---|---|---|---|---|---|
| | 1 Jan | (South Africa) II South African Grand Prix | Prince George Circuit, East London | Formula Libre handicap | ? | ? | 2h 16m | (Italy) Mario Mazzacurati | Bugatti Type 35B | Report |
| | 23 Feb | (Sweden) IV Sveriges Vinter Grand Prix | Lake Rämen | Formula Libre | sunny, cold | 375 km | 3h 46m | (Norway) Eugen Bjørnstad | Alfa Romeo 8C-2600 Monza | Report |
| | 1 Mar | (France) IV Grand Prix de Pau | Pau | Formula Libre | sunny | 275 km | 3h 22m | (France) Philippe Étancelin | Maserati V8 RI | Report |
| | 8 Mar | (Norway) III Norges Grand Prix | Lake Gjersjøen, Oslo | Formula Libre | sunny | 60 km | 35m | (Norway) Eugen Bjørnstad | Alfa Romeo 8C-2300 Monza | Report |
| | 29 Mar | (Brazil) Grand Prix Terminal | Poços de Caldas | Formula Libre | ? | 200 km | 2h 31m | (Brazil) Arthur Nascimento | Ford 3.6L Special | Report |
| | 30 Mar | (Australia) Australian Tourist Trophy | Phillip Island | Formula Libre handicap | ? | 200 miles | 3h 06m | (Australia) Jack Fagan | MG K3 Magnette | Report |
| | 4 Apr | (United Kingdom) V British Empire Trophy | Donington Park | Formula Libre handicap | ? | 250 miles | 3h 54m | (United Kingdom) Richard Seaman | Maserati 8CM | Report |
| | 11 Apr | (Monaco) I Coupe de Prince Rainier | Monte Carlo | Voiturette | cold | 160 km | 1h 52m | (Thailand) Prince "B. Bira" | ERA B | Report |
| A | 10 May | (Libya) X Gran Premio di Tripoli (IV Lotteria di Tripoli) | Mellaha | Formula Libre | hot, windy | 525 km | 2h 31m | (Italy) Achille Varzi | Auto Union Type C | Report |
| | 10 May | (Finland) V Eläintarhanajot (Djurgårdsloppet) | Eläintarharata | Formula Libre | sunny | 100 km | 56m | (Norway) Eugen Bjørnstad | Alfa Romeo 8C-2300 Monza | Report |
| | 16 May | (Republic of Ireland) I Cork International Road Race | Carrigrohane | Formula Libre | ? | ? | ? | (United Kingdom) Reggie Tongue | ERA B | Report |
| B | 17 May | (Tunisia) VII Grand Prix de Tunisie | Carthage | Formula Libre | hot | 380 km | 2h 23m | (Germany) Rudolf Caracciola | Mercedes-Benz W25K | Report |
| | 26 May | (Germany) Avusrennen | AVUS | | | | | cancelled for Olympics | | |
| | 28 May | (United Kingdom) IV RAC International Light Car Race | Douglas | Voiturette | sunny | 200 miles | 2h 52m | (United Kingdom) Richard Seaman | Delage 15S8 | Report |
| | 30 May | (United States) XXIV International 500 Mile; Sweepstakes | Indianapolis | AAA | sunny | 500 miles | 4h 35m | (United States) Louis Meyer | Stevens-Miller | Report |
| | 31 May | (Belgium) XI Grand Prix des Frontières | Chimay | Voiturette | rain at start | 220 km | 1h 49m | (Netherlands) Eddie Hertzberger | MG K3 Magnette | Report |
| | 31 May | (Portugal) I Circuito de Santarém | Santarém | Formula Libre | ? | 100 km | 1h 14m | (Portugal) Jorge, Conde Monte Real | Bugatti Type 35C | Report |
| C | 7 Jun | (Spain) VII Gran Premio de Penya Rhin | Montjuïc Park | AIACR | sunny | 300 km | 2h 43m | (Italy) Tazio Nuvolari | Alfa Romeo 12C/36 | Report |
| | 7 Jun | (Brazil) IV Grande Prêmio da Cidade de Rio de Janeiro | Gávea | Formula Libre | sunny | 280 km | 3h 53m | (Argentina) Vittorio Coppoli | Bugatti Type 37A | Report |
| D | 14 Jun | (Germany) X Eifelrennen | Nürburgring | AIACR; Voiturette | rain, fog | 230 km | 1h 57m | (Germany) Bernd Rosemeyer | Auto Union Type C | Report |
| E | 21 Jun | (Hungary) Magyar Nagydíj | Nepliget Park, Budapest | Formula Libre | sunny | 250 km | 2h 14m | (Italy) Tazio Nuvolari | Alfa Romeo 8C-35 | Report |
| | 21 Jun | (France) XII Grand Prix de Picardie | Péronne | Voiturette, heats | hot | 150 km | 1h 05m | (Thailand) Prince "B. Bira" | ERA B | Report |
| | 28 Jun | (Italy) I Circuito di Milano | Parco Sempione | AIACR; Voiturette | ? | 160 km | 1h 36m | (Italy) Tazio Nuvolari | Alfa Romeo 12C-36 | Report |
| | 5 Jul | (France) XI Grand Prix de la Marne | Reims-Gueux | sports | ? | 400 km | 2h 51m | (France) Jean-Pierre Wimille | Bugatti Type 57G | Report |
| | 12 Jul | (Brazil) Grande Prêmio da Cidade de São Paulo | Jardim América | Formula Libre | ? | 250 km | 2h 26m | (Italy) Carlo Pintacuda | Alfa Romeo 2900A | Report |
| | 12 Jul | (France) IV Grand Prix de l'Albigeois | Les Planques, Albi | Voiturette, heats | sunny | 2x 180 km | 2h 24m | (Thailand) Prince "B. Bira" | ERA B | Report |
| | 19 Jul | (France) I Deauville Grand Prix | Deauville | Formula Libre | ? | 370 km | 2h 26m | (France) Jean-Pierre Wimille | Bugatti Type 59 | Report |
| | 26 Jul | (Portugal) V Circuito Internationale de Vila Real | Vila Real | Formula Libre | ? | 220 km | 2h 04m | (Portugal) Vasco Sameiro | Alfa Romeo 8C-2600 Monza | Report |
| F | 2 Aug | (Italy) X Coppa Ciano | Livorno | Formula Libre; Voiturette | sunny | 210 km | 1h 45m | (Italy) Carlo Maria Pintacuda (Italy) Tazio Nuvolari | Alfa Romeo 8C-35 | Report |
| | 9 Aug | (France) XII Grand Prix du Comminges | Saint-Gaudens | sports | ? | 440 km | 2h 53m | (France) Jean-Pierre Wimille | Bugatti Type 59 | Report |
| G | 15 Aug | (Italy) XII Coppa Acerbo | Pescara | AIACR; Voiturette | hot | 410 km | 2h 58m | (Germany) Bernd Rosemeyer | Auto Union Type C | Report |
| | 23 Aug | (France) III Prix de Berne | Bremgarten | Voiturette | sunny | 200 km | 1h 27m | (United Kingdom) Richard Seaman | Delage 15S8 | Report |
| | 29 Aug | (United Kingdom) IX JCC 200 Mile race | Donington Park | Voiturette | sunny | 200 km | 1h 27m | (United Kingdom) Richard Seaman | Delage 15S8 | Report |
| | 6 Sep/ 7 Sep | (Italy) II Coppa Edda Ciano; II Circuito di Lucca | Lucca | AIACR; Voiturette | wet | 120 km | 1h 13m | (Italy) Mario Tadini | Alfa Romeo 8C-35 | Report |
| | 13 Sep | (Estonia) IV Eesti Suursõit | Pirita-Kose, Tallinn | Formula Libre | ? | 70 km | 44 mins | (Finland) Aleksi Patama | Ford | Report |
| | 20 Sep/ 21 Sep | (Italy) V Circuito di Modena | Modena | AIACR; Voiturette | sunny | 160 km | 1h 27m | (Italy) Tazio Nuvolari | Alfa Romeo 12C-36 | Report |
| | 3 Oct | (United Kingdom) II Donington Grand Prix | Donington Park | Formula Libre | sunny | 300 miles | 4h 25m | (Switzerland) Hans Rüesch (United Kingdom) Richard Seaman | Alfa Romeo Tipo 8C-35 | Report |
| | 12 Oct | (United States) I George Vanderbilt Cup | Roosevelt Raceway, New York | Formula Libre | sunny | 300 miles | 4h 33m | (Italy) Tazio Nuvolari | Alfa Romeo 12C-36 | Report |
| | 18 Oct | (Argentina) II Gran Premio de Buenos Aires | Costanera Norte | Formula Libre, heats | ? | 80 km | 43min | (Argentina) Carlos Arzani | Alfa Romeo 2900A | Report |
| | 1 Nov | (Romania) I Bucharest Grand Prix | Bucuresti | Formula Libre | ? | 110 km | 1h 09m | (Romania) Iorgu Ghica | Maserati 8CM | Report |
| | 20 Dec | (Italy) XXVII Targa Florio | Piccolo Madonie | sports | sunny | 140 km | 2h 09m | (Italy) Costantino Magistri | Lancia Augusta | Report |

== Regulations and Organisation ==
This was the third year of the 750 kg Formula and, as such, no significant changes were made to the regulations. The European Championship was held again albeit only with four races in it. European political tensions were escalating and the effects were directly affecting the racing program across the continent. Countries were experiencing embargoes, shortages and riots; in March Hitler sent German troops into reoccupy the Rhineland and in July Spain erupted into full-blown civil war. Thus, both the Belgian and Spanish Grands Prix were cancelled.

At the end of 1935, the European racing unions had met to discuss options for a new formula. The current success of voiturette racing led to a proposal for the top class to be 1.5-litre cars. Another was 2.7-litre supercharged/4-litre unsupercharged formula. However, nothing final was decided. The French racing authority, the ACF, instead chose to opt out of the AIACR regulations. With Bugatti and the abortive SEFAC project unable to make any impression on the German dominance, they were fed up with humiliating defeats. They therefore chose to run the national Grand Prix, and their major races, to a sports car formula – for 2-seater cars with unsupercharged engines. Enthusiastically supported by the French automotive industry, new models were built by Bugatti, Delahaye, Talbot and Delage.

In October, another meeting of the AIACR finally decided on a new 4.5-litre/3-litre formula, to come into effect from 1938.

=== Technical innovation ===
Mercedes-Benz had been the best cars in 1935 and for this season, they introduced a new 5.6-litre V12 engine. However, this bigger engine was heavier and with a 750 kg maximum weight, savings had to be found elsewhere. Along with a revised gearbox and suspension, the car was shortened by 25 cm. However, the car was found to be virtually undriveable, so the team had to urgently bore out the current 4-litre engine to 4.7-litres and dropped into the new chassis.

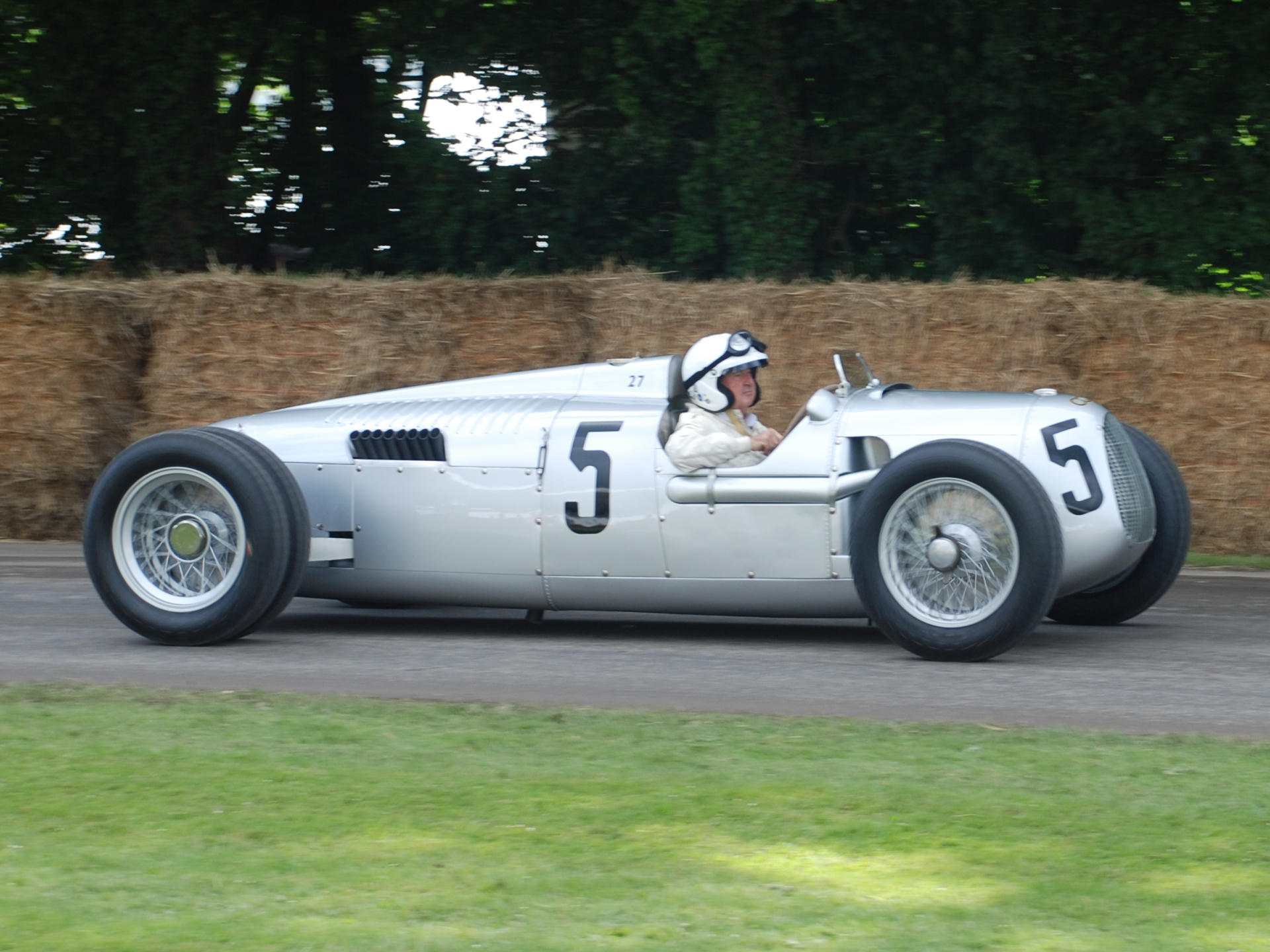
Auto Union Type C

Auto Union had its new Type C, who had successfully been able to fit a remarkable supercharged 6.0-litre V16 that put out 520 bhp and still staying under the 750 kg weight limit. Four inches longer, with a limited-slip differential and torsion-bar suspension now installed, the handling was greatly improved.

Alfa Romeo, having released their interim 8C-35 model late in the previous season, continued its development. Called the 12C-36, the new 4.1-litre V12 supercharged engine was made with magnesium alloy and put out 370 bhp. It was hoped that Alfa's best engine coupled with independent suspension would allow their drivers match the German teams. Maserati and Bugatti made desultory efforts at development of their Grand Prix cars – as the former concentrated on voiturette racing and the latter on the new French sports car regulations.

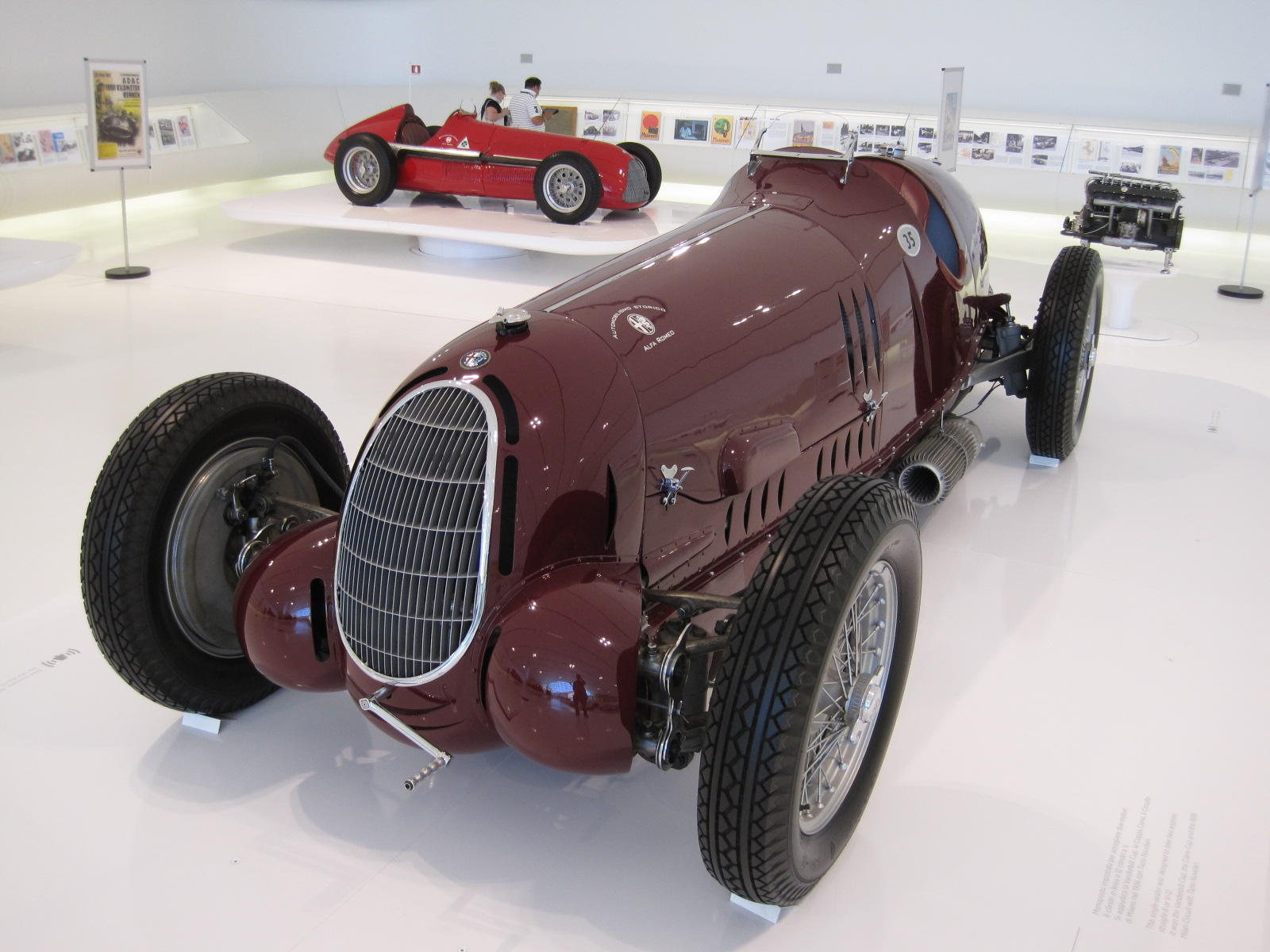
Alfa Romeo Type 12C-36

After its successes the previous season, the ERA team focused on building more cars for sale, to fill up the grids. Nine Type Bs had been sold to customers. Their primary opposition was from Maserati, who unveiled the new 6CM. Looking like a miniature version of the V8 RI, it gave away horsepower to the heavier ERA, but had better handling with its independent suspension. Former racing driver Giulio Ramponi worked with the up-and-coming Richard Seaman, and convinced him to buy the 1927-vintage Delage 15S8 from Earl Howe. Despite its age, fitted with a modern supercharger, it was still very competitive – with not even the mighty Auto Union able to exceed the 100 bhp per litre barrier as the Delage did.

| Manufacturer | Model | Engine | Power Output | Max. Speed (km/h) | Dry Weight (kg) |
|---|---|---|---|---|---|
| (Germany) Mercedes-Benz | W25C | Mercedes-Benz 4.7L S8 supercharged | 460 bhp | 315 | 750 |
| (Germany) Auto Union | Type C | Auto Union 6.0L V16 supercharged | 520 bhp | 300 | 750 |
| (Italy) Alfa Romeo | 12C/36 | Alfa Romeo 4.0L V12 twin-supercharged | 370 bhp | 290 | 740 |
| (Italy) Alfa Romeo | 8C/35 | Alfa Romeo 3.8L S8 supercharged | 330 bhp | 275 | 750 |
| (Italy) Maserati | V8-RI | Maserati 4.8L V8 supercharged | 320 bhp | 270 | 735 |
| (France) Bugatti | Type 59/50B | Bugatti 4.7L S8 supercharged | 370 bhp | 260 | 750 |
| (United Kingdom) ERA | B | Riley 1488cc S6 supercharged | 150 bhp | 200 | 780 |
| (Italy) Maserati | 6CM | Maserati 1493cc S6 supercharged | 155 bhp | 215 | 650 |
| (Italy) Maserati | 4CM | Maserati 1496cc S4 supercharged | 135 bhp | 155 | 680 |
| (France) Delage | 15S8 | Delage 1487cc S8 supercharged | 185 bhp | 241 | 630 |

== Teams and drivers ==
For another season, Mercedes-Benz kept its driver line-up of Rudolf Caracciola, Luigi Fagioli and Manfred von Brauchitsch. Team-manager Alfred Neubauer had had run-ins with the Italian but felt his options were too limited to drop him. However, Caracciola was able to convince Neubauer to bring his good friend Louis Chiron into the team. (which had to be approved by Hitler). The reserve driver would be young German Hermann Lang. Formerly a factory mechanic, driving the race-transporter, his low station was oft derided by team veterans Caracciola and von Brauchitsch.

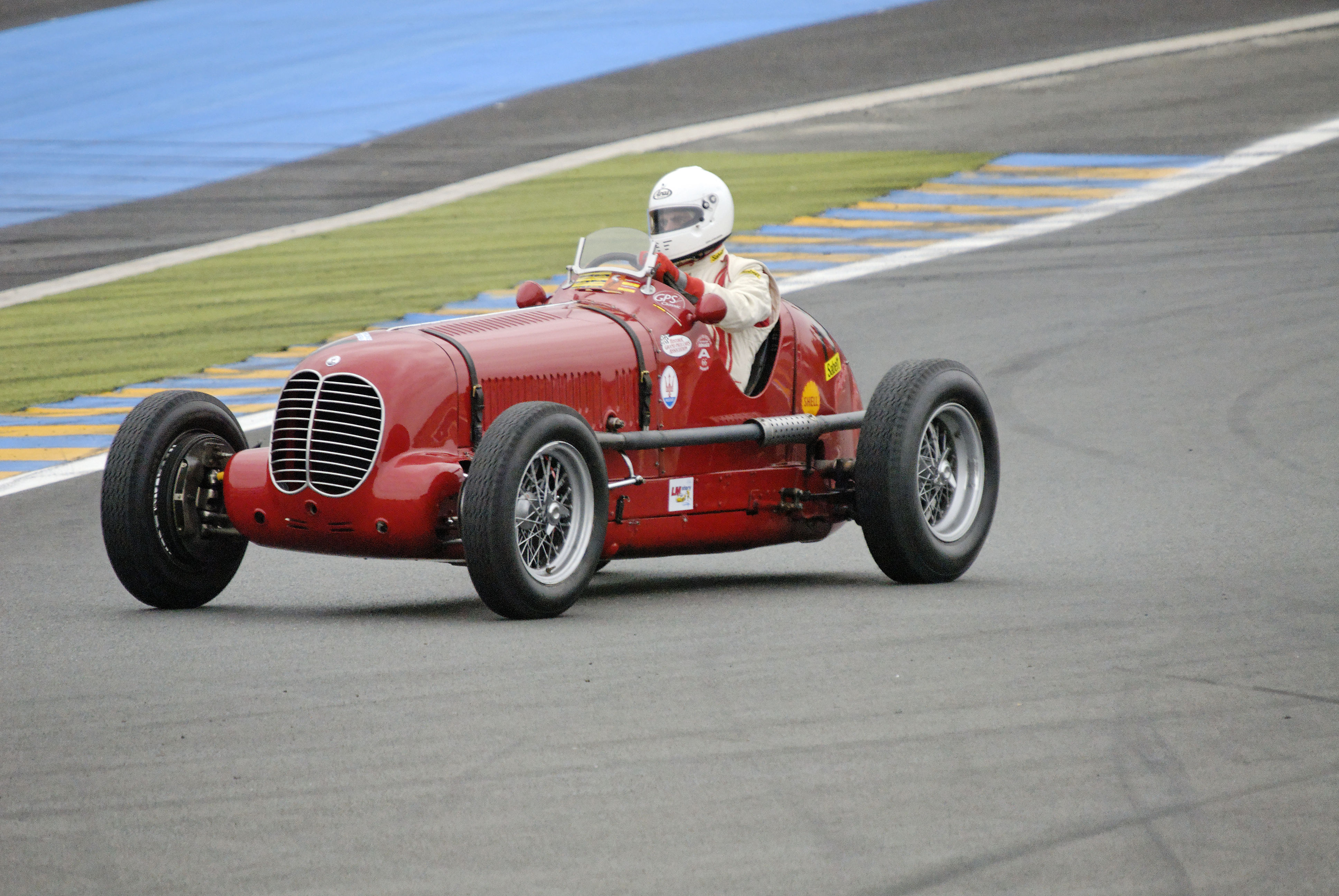
Maserati 6CM

Auto Union had a strong driver list and kept the experienced Achille Varzi and Hans Stuck, while their new driver, Bernd Rosemeyer, had proven a revelation last season. Rosemeyer was being built up as a German propaganda idol, and with him dating the famous aviator Elly Beinhorn, they were touted as an ideal Nazi couple. Dr Karl Feuereissen took over from Willy Walb as team manager. His reserve drivers would be Ernst von Delius and Rudolf Hasse. Paul Pietsch had left the team, and his marriage, after Varzi started an affair with his wife. The start of the year saw the two lead drivers in hospital – with Varzi having a throat, and then appendix, operation, and Rosemeyer with jaundice and liver issues. Further drama ensued in the winter-testing at Monza: after the team was almost trapped going over the St Gotthard Pass, junior driver Karl Rudolf Heydel was driving Stuck's Auto Union when he lost control at the Curva del Violone. The car rolled 200 metres, throwing Heydel out and killing him instantly.

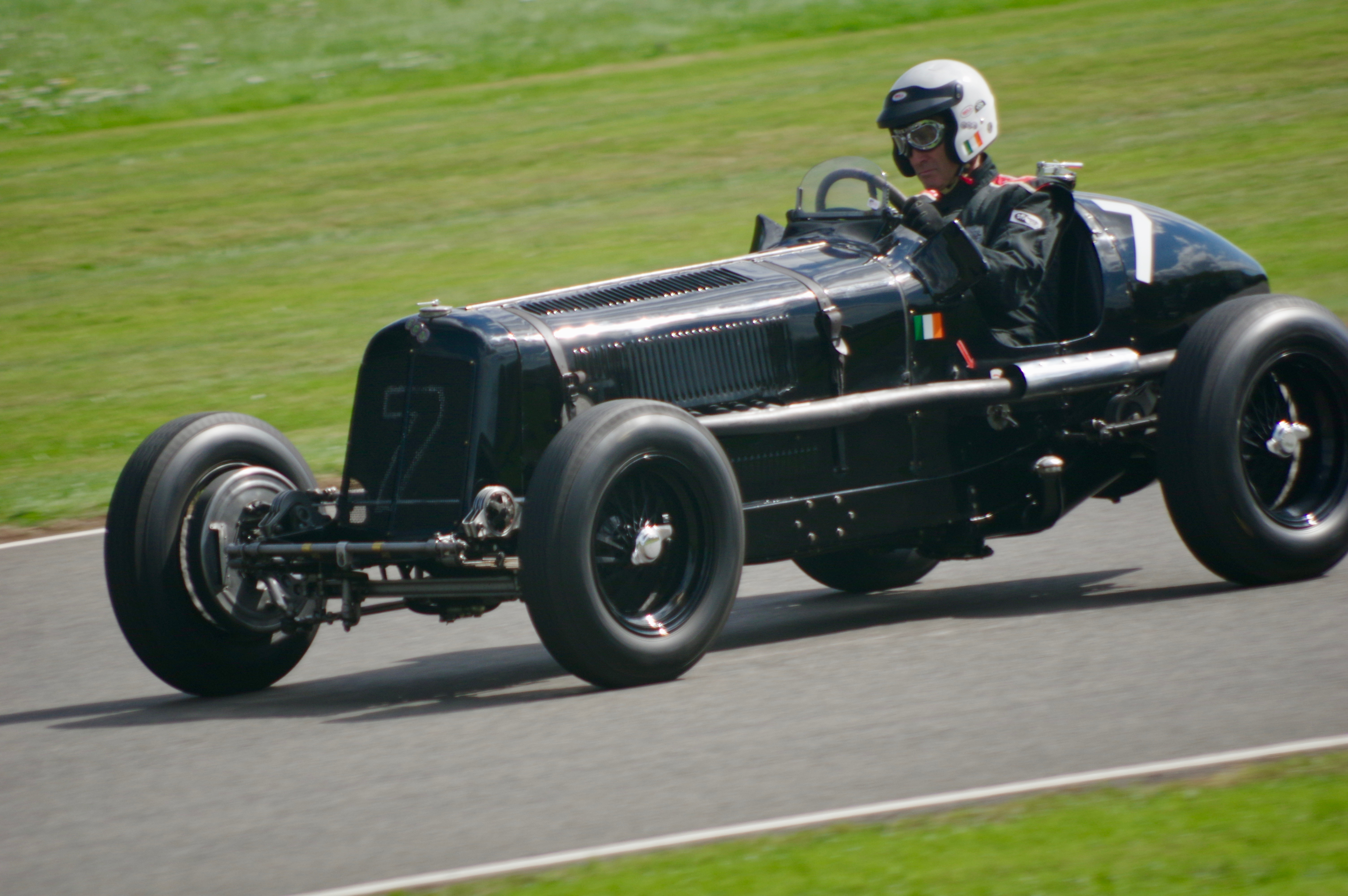
ERA Type B

Scuderia Ferrari still had their trump card in Tazio Nuvolari, who had consistently shown he could wring a strong performance out of the Alfa Romeos to compete with the German teams. Conte Carlo Felice Trossi had resigned as President of the Scuderia (which he had been since 1932) and moved to Maserati. With René Dreyfus testing the new Talbot sports-car in the first half of the season, Marchese Antonio Brivio moved up to be the regular second driver, supported by Mario Tadini and Carlo Pintacuda. Giuseppe Farina was also brought into the team, who was a free agent after Gino Rovere closed his team.

Rovere had become President of Maserati and the Scuderia Subalpina customer team was renamed Scuderia Torino. They mainly focused on the Italian races with a number of drivers, including Trossi, Eugenio Siena and Pietro Ghersi. They ran a variety of Maseratis – the new V8-RI alongside the dated 6C-34 and 8CM. The works team did enter the voiturette races – with the new 6CM available for Rovere and Trossi; who were also joined by Italian motorcycle ace Omobono Tenni.

Bugatti had virtually given up on Grand Prix racing, concentrating on the new car for the French sports-car formula. A single Type 59 variant was prepared for Jean-Pierre Wimille in some of the major races, and a one-off second car for William Grover-Williams at Monaco (the inaugural winner of that race, in 1929). The company even gave up on voiturette racing and their regular works driver, Pierre Veyron, only competed at Albi.

Both Maserati and ERA had sold a number of their cars to privateer drivers, to support their works teams. There was now a considerable calendar for voiturette races and the sizeable fields had many competitive cars of those two marques, and to a lesser extent, Bugatti. The notable outlier was Dick Seaman with his black Delage.

These tables only intend to cover entries in the major races, using the key above. It includes all starters in the European Championship races. Sources:

| Entrant | Constructor | Chassis | Engine | Tyre | Driver | Rounds |
|---|---|---|---|---|---|---|
| (Germany) Daimler-Benz AG | Mercedes-Benz | W25K; W25; W25C | Mercedes-Benz 4.7L S8 s/c Mercedes-Benz 4.3L S8 s/c Mercedes-Benz 4.7L S8 s/c | C | (Germany) Rudolf Caracciola | 1, 2, 3; A, B, C, D, E |
| (Germany) Daimler-Benz AG | Mercedes-Benz | W25K; W25; W25C | Mercedes-Benz 4.7L S8 s/c Mercedes-Benz 4.3L S8 s/c Mercedes-Benz 4.7L S8 s/c | C | (Italy) Luigi Fagioli | 1, 2, 3; A, [D], [F] |
| (Germany) Daimler-Benz AG | Mercedes-Benz | W25K; W25; W25C | Mercedes-Benz 4.7L S8 s/c Mercedes-Benz 4.3L S8 s/c Mercedes-Benz 4.7L S8 s/c | C | (Germany) Manfred von Brauchitsch | 1, 2, 3; A, D, E, [F] |
| (Germany) Daimler-Benz AG | Mercedes-Benz | W25K; W25; W25C | Mercedes-Benz 4.7L S8 s/c Mercedes-Benz 4.3L S8 s/c Mercedes-Benz 4.7L S8 s/c | C | (Monaco) Louis Chiron | 1, 2, 3*; A, B, C, D, E |
| (Germany) Daimler-Benz AG | Mercedes-Benz | W25K; W25; W25C | Mercedes-Benz 4.7L S8 s/c Mercedes-Benz 4.3L S8 s/c Mercedes-Benz 4.7L S8 s/c | C | (Germany) Hermann Lang | 2, 3; [A], B*, C*, D, E* |
| (Germany) Auto Union AG | Auto Union | Type C | Auto Union 6.0L V16 s/c | C | (Italy) Achille Varzi | 1, 3, 4; A, B, [C], D, E, F, G |
| (Germany) Auto Union AG | Auto Union | Type C | Auto Union 6.0L V16 s/c | C | (Germany) Hans Stuck | 1, 2, 3, 4; A, B, D, E, F, [G] |
| (Germany) Auto Union AG | Auto Union | Type C | Auto Union 6.0L V16 s/c | C | (Germany) Bernd Rosemeyer | 1, 2, 3, 4; A, B, C, D, E, F, G |
| (Germany) Auto Union AG | Auto Union | Type C | Auto Union 6.0L V16 s/c | C | (Germany) Ernst von Delius | 1*, 2, 3*, 4; C, D, E*, G |
| (Germany) Auto Union AG | Auto Union | Type C | Auto Union 6.0L V16 s/c | C | (Germany) Rudolf Hasse | 2, 3, 4*; D* |
| (Italy) Scuderia Ferrari | Alfa Romeo | 8C-35; 12C-36 | Alfa Romeo 3.8L S8 s/c Alfa Romeo 4.1L V12 s/c | E | (Italy) Tazio Nuvolari | 1, 2, 3, 4; A, C, D, E, F, G |
| (Italy) Scuderia Ferrari | Alfa Romeo | 8C-35; 12C-36 | Alfa Romeo 3.8L S8 s/c Alfa Romeo 4.1L V12 s/c | E | (Italy) Marchese Antonio Brivio | 1, 2, 4*; A, B, C, D, [E], F, G |
| (Italy) Scuderia Ferrari | Alfa Romeo | 8C-35; 12C-36 | Alfa Romeo 3.8L S8 s/c Alfa Romeo 4.1L V12 s/c | E | (Italy) Mario Tadini | 1; A, E |
| (Italy) Scuderia Ferrari | Alfa Romeo | 8C-35; 12C-36 | Alfa Romeo 3.8L S8 s/c Alfa Romeo 4.1L V12 s/c | E | (Italy) Dr Giuseppe Farina | 1, 3, 4; C, D, G |
| (Italy) Scuderia Ferrari | Alfa Romeo | 8C-35; 12C-36 | Alfa Romeo 3.8L S8 s/c Alfa Romeo 4.1L V12 s/c | E | (France) René Dreyfus | 2, 3, 4; F, G |
| (Italy) Scuderia Ferrari | Alfa Romeo | 8C-35; 12C-36 | Alfa Romeo 3.8L S8 s/c Alfa Romeo 4.1L V12 s/c | E | (Italy) Francesco Severi | 2; C*, D, F* |
| (Italy) Scuderia Ferrari | Alfa Romeo | 8C-35; 12C-36 | Alfa Romeo 3.8L S8 s/c Alfa Romeo 4.1L V12 s/c | E | (Italy) Carlo Pintacuda | 4; A, B, F |
| (France) Automobiles; Ettore Bugatti | Bugatti | Bugatti Type 59/50B; Bugatti Type 59/50; Type 59 | Bugatti 4.7L S8 s/c Bugatti 5.0L S8 s/c Bugatti 3.3L S8 s/c | ? | (France) Jean-Pierre Wimille | 1, 2, 3; B, C |
| (France) Automobiles; Ettore Bugatti | Bugatti | Bugatti Type 59/50B; Bugatti Type 59/50; Type 59 | Bugatti 4.7L S8 s/c Bugatti 5.0L S8 s/c Bugatti 3.3L S8 s/c | ? | (United Kingdom) William Grover-Williams | 1 |
| (Italy) Scuderia Torino | Maserati | V8-R1; Tipo 6C-34; Tipo 8CM | Maserati 4.8L V8 s/c Maserati 3.7L S6 s/c Maserati 3.0L S8 s/c | ? | (Italy) Conte Carlo Felice Trossi | 1, 2, 4; [A], F* |
| (Italy) Scuderia Torino | Maserati | V8-R1; Tipo 6C-34; Tipo 8CM | Maserati 4.8L V8 s/c Maserati 3.7L S6 s/c Maserati 3.0L S8 s/c | ? | (Italy) Pietro Ghersi | 1; A, F, G |
| (Italy) Scuderia Torino | Maserati | V8-R1; Tipo 6C-34; Tipo 8CM | Maserati 4.8L V8 s/c Maserati 3.7L S6 s/c Maserati 3.0L S8 s/c | ? | (Italy) Eugenio Siena | 1; A |
| (Italy) Scuderia Torino | Maserati | V8-R1; Tipo 6C-34; Tipo 8CM | Maserati 4.8L V8 s/c Maserati 3.7L S6 s/c Maserati 3.0L S8 s/c | ? | (United Kingdom) Richard Seaman | 2; G |
| (Italy) Scuderia Torino | Maserati | V8-R1; Tipo 6C-34; Tipo 8CM | Maserati 4.8L V8 s/c Maserati 3.7L S6 s/c Maserati 3.0L S8 s/c | ? | (Italy) Piero Dusio | 4 |
| (Italy) Scuderia Torino | Maserati | V8-R1; Tipo 6C-34; Tipo 8CM | Maserati 4.8L V8 s/c Maserati 3.7L S6 s/c Maserati 3.0L S8 s/c | ? | (Italy) Ettore Bianco | 4* |
| (Italy) Scuderia Torino | Maserati | V8-R1; Tipo 6C-34; Tipo 8CM | Maserati 4.8L V8 s/c Maserati 3.7L S6 s/c Maserati 3.0L S8 s/c | ? | (Italy) Guglielmo Carraroli | A |
| (Italy) Scuderia Torino | Maserati | V8-R1; Tipo 6C-34; Tipo 8CM | Maserati 4.8L V8 s/c Maserati 3.7L S6 s/c Maserati 3.0L S8 s/c | ? | (Italy) Luigi Soffietti | A |
| (Italy) Scuderia Maremmana | Alfa Romeo Maserati | Tipo B 8C-2600; Tipo 6C-34; Tipo 8CM | Alfa Romeo 2.6L S8 s/c Alfa Romeo 3.2L S8 s/c Alfa Romeo 2.6L S8 s/c Maserati 3.7L S6 s/c Maserati 3.0L S8 s/c | ? | (Italy) Clemente Biondetti | 3, 4; [A], F, G |
| (Italy) Scuderia Maremmana | Alfa Romeo Maserati | Tipo B 8C-2600; Tipo 6C-34; Tipo 8CM | Alfa Romeo 2.6L S8 s/c Alfa Romeo 3.2L S8 s/c Alfa Romeo 2.6L S8 s/c Maserati 3.7L S6 s/c Maserati 3.0L S8 s/c | ? | (Italy) Francesco Severi | A |
| (Italy) Scuderia Maremmana | Alfa Romeo Maserati | Tipo B 8C-2600; Tipo 6C-34; Tipo 8CM | Alfa Romeo 2.6L S8 s/c Alfa Romeo 3.2L S8 s/c Alfa Romeo 2.6L S8 s/c Maserati 3.7L S6 s/c Maserati 3.0L S8 s/c | ? | (Italy) Renato Balestrero | A |
| (Italy) Scuderia Maremmana | Alfa Romeo Maserati | Tipo B 8C-2600; Tipo 6C-34; Tipo 8CM | Alfa Romeo 2.6L S8 s/c Alfa Romeo 3.2L S8 s/c Alfa Romeo 2.6L S8 s/c Maserati 3.7L S6 s/c Maserati 3.0L S8 s/c | ? | (Italy) Archimede Rosa | A |
| (Italy) Scuderia Maremmana | Alfa Romeo Maserati | Tipo B 8C-2600; Tipo 6C-34; Tipo 8CM | Alfa Romeo 2.6L S8 s/c Alfa Romeo 3.2L S8 s/c Alfa Romeo 2.6L S8 s/c Maserati 3.7L S6 s/c Maserati 3.0L S8 s/c | ? | (Switzerland) Jacques 'Giacomo' de Rham | 3 |
| (Italy) Scuderia Maremmana | Alfa Romeo Maserati | Tipo B 8C-2600; Tipo 6C-34; Tipo 8CM | Alfa Romeo 2.6L S8 s/c Alfa Romeo 3.2L S8 s/c Alfa Romeo 2.6L S8 s/c Maserati 3.7L S6 s/c Maserati 3.0L S8 s/c | ? | (Italy) Pietro Ghersi | 4 |
| (Spain) Scuderia Villapadierna | Alfa Romeo Maserati | Tipo B Tipo 8CM | Alfa Romeo 3.2L S8 s/c Maserati 3.0L S8 s/c | ? | (Spain) Conde José de Villapadierna | B, C, [E] |
| (Spain) Scuderia Villapadierna | Alfa Romeo Maserati | Tipo B Tipo 8CM | Alfa Romeo 3.2L S8 s/c Maserati 3.0L S8 s/c | ? | (Chile) Juan Zanelli | 2 |
| (United Kingdom) English Racing Automobiles | ERA | B A | Riley 1488cc S6 s/c | ? | (United Kingdom) Raymond Mays | 1v, 3v; Dv |
| (United Kingdom) English Racing Automobiles | ERA | B A | Riley 1488cc S6 s/c | ? | (United Kingdom) Earl Howe | 1v, 3v; Dv |
| (United Kingdom) English Racing Automobiles | ERA | B A | Riley 1488cc S6 s/c | ? | (French Algeria) Marcel Lehoux † | 1v; Bv, Dv |
| (United Kingdom) English Racing Automobiles | ERA | B A | Riley 1488cc S6 s/c | ? | (United Kingdom) Pat Fairfield | 1v♠, 3v |
| (United Kingdom) Austin Motor Company | Austin | 7 AEK | Austin 747cc S4 | ? | (Germany) Walter Bäumer | 3v; Dv♠ |
| (Italy) Officine Alfieri Maserati SpA | Maserati | Tipo 6CM; Tipo 4CM | Maserati 1493cc S6 s/c Maserati 1496cc S4 s/c | ? | (Italy) Gino Rovere | 1v; Fv, Gv |
| (Italy) Officine Alfieri Maserati SpA | Maserati | Tipo 6CM; Tipo 4CM | Maserati 1493cc S6 s/c Maserati 1496cc S4 s/c | ? | (Italy) Omobono Tenni | 1v, [3v]; Dv |
| (Italy) Officine Alfieri Maserati SpA | Maserati | Tipo 6CM; Tipo 4CM | Maserati 1493cc S6 s/c Maserati 1496cc S4 s/c | ? | (Italy) Conte Goffredo Zehender | 1v |
| (Italy) Officine Alfieri Maserati SpA | Maserati | Tipo 6CM; Tipo 4CM | Maserati 1493cc S6 s/c Maserati 1496cc S4 s/c | ? | (Italy) Vittorio Belmondo | 3v |
| (Italy) Officine Alfieri Maserati SpA | Maserati | Tipo 6CM; Tipo 4CM | Maserati 1493cc S6 s/c Maserati 1496cc S4 s/c | ? | (Italy) Conte Carlo Felice Trossi | [3v]; Dv, Fv, Gv |
| (Italy) Officine Alfieri Maserati SpA | Maserati | Tipo 6CM; Tipo 4CM | Maserati 1493cc S6 s/c Maserati 1496cc S4 s/c | ? | (Hungary) László Hartmann | [1♠]; Dv, E, Fv, [F♠] |

=== Privateer Drivers ===
| Entrant | Constructor | Chassis | Engine | Driver | Rounds |
|---|---|---|---|---|---|
| Private Entrant | Alfa Romeo | Tipo B | Alfa Romeo 3.2L S8 s/c | (France) Raymond Sommer | 1, 2, 3; A, B, C |
| Private Entrant | Maserati | V8-RI | Maserati 4.8L V8 s/c | (France) Philippe Étancelin | 1, 3; A, B, C |
| Private Entrant | Maserati Alfa Romeo Maserati | 6C-34; Tipo B 4CS | Maserati 3.7L S6 s/c Alfa Romeo 2.9L S8 s/c Maserati 1.5L S6 s/c | (Italy) / (Switzerland) Hans Rüesch | 1v, 3v, [3]; A, Dv, Gv, G |
| Private Entrant | Maserati | 8CM | Maserati 3.0L S8 s/c | (New Zealand) / (United Kingdom) Thomas Cholmondeley-Tapper | 2 |
| Private Entrant | Alfa Romeo | Tipo B | Alfa Romeo 2.9L S8 s/c | (United Kingdom) Charlie Martin | [3]; D, E |
| Private Entrant | Alfa Romeo | Tipo B | Alfa Romeo 3.2L S8 s/c | (United Kingdom) Austin Dobson | E, G |
| Private Entrant | Delage | 15S8 | Delage 1496cc S8 s/c | (United Kingdom) Richard Seaman | [1v], 3v; Dv, Fv, Gv |
| Private Entrant | Maserati Fiat | 4CM; 508 Balilla | Maserati 1496cc S4 s/c Fiat 1493cc S6 s/c | (Italy) Luigi Villoresi | 1v, 3v; Dv, Fv, Gv |
| Private Entrant | ERA | A | ERA 1488cc S6 s/c | (Greece) / (United Kingdom) Nicholas Embiricos | 1v, 3v; Dv, Fv, [Gv] |
| Private Entrant | ERA | B | ERA 1488cc S6 s/c | (Thailand) Prince "B. Bira" | 1v, 3v; Dv, Gv |
| Private Entrant | Maserati | 4CM | Maserati 1496cc S4 s/c | (Switzerland) Christian Kautz | 1v, 3v; Dv |
| Private Entrant | Maserati | 4CM; 6CM | Maserati 1496cc S4 s/c Maserati 1493cc S6 s/c | (Australia) Freddie McEvoy | 1v, 3v; Fv, Gv |
| Private Entrant | Maserati | 4CM | Maserati 1496cc S4 s/c | (Italy) Ettore Bianco | 1v, 3v; Fv |

‘’Note:‘’ * indicates only raced in the event as a relief driver,
"♠" Works driver raced as a privateer in that race,
"v" indicates the driver ran in the Voiturette race,
"†" driver killed during this racing season,
Those in brackets show that, although entered, the driver did not race

== Season review ==
The year started with a series of short ice-races across the Nordic countries. It also saw the 1936 Winter Olympics held in the Bavarian Alps. Ferrari driver Antonio Brivio was in the Italian bobsled team, but it was Australian Freddie McEvoy, competing under the British flag, who won a bronze medal in the 4-man bobsleigh. Although a number of racing drivers have competed at the Olympics, McEvoy has been the only one to medal until Alex Zanardi won gold at the Paralympics in 2012 and 2016.

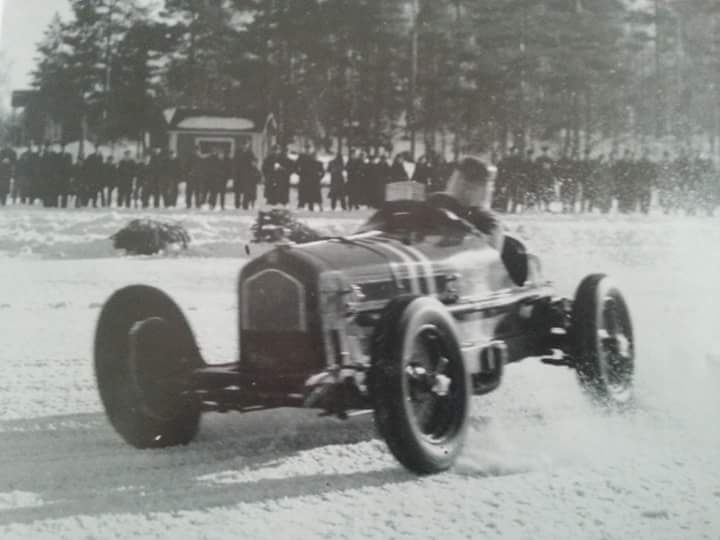
Eugen Bjørnstad won the Swedish and Norwegian Winter GPs in his Alfa Romeo

The circuit grand-prix season started at Pau at the beginning of March. Ferrari had entered Nuvolari, Brivio and Farina. However, following a League of Nations embargo on Italy for their war in Abyssinia, the Italian government forbade the team from competing. This still left a strong field of French privateers, along with Jean-Pierre Wimille in a works Bugatti and Welshman Charlie Martin who had recently bought an Alfa P3. Wimille started in pole position and initially dominated the race until retiring with a broken brake-linkage. Then, for half the race, it was Raymond Sommer and Philippe Étancelin, barely seconds apart, duelling for the lead. When Sommer broke his axle when he mounted the footpath trying to overtake a backmarker, it left Étancelin to take the win, easing off with Martin finishing just thirteen seconds behind. It would prove to be the only major victory for the Maserati V8 RI.

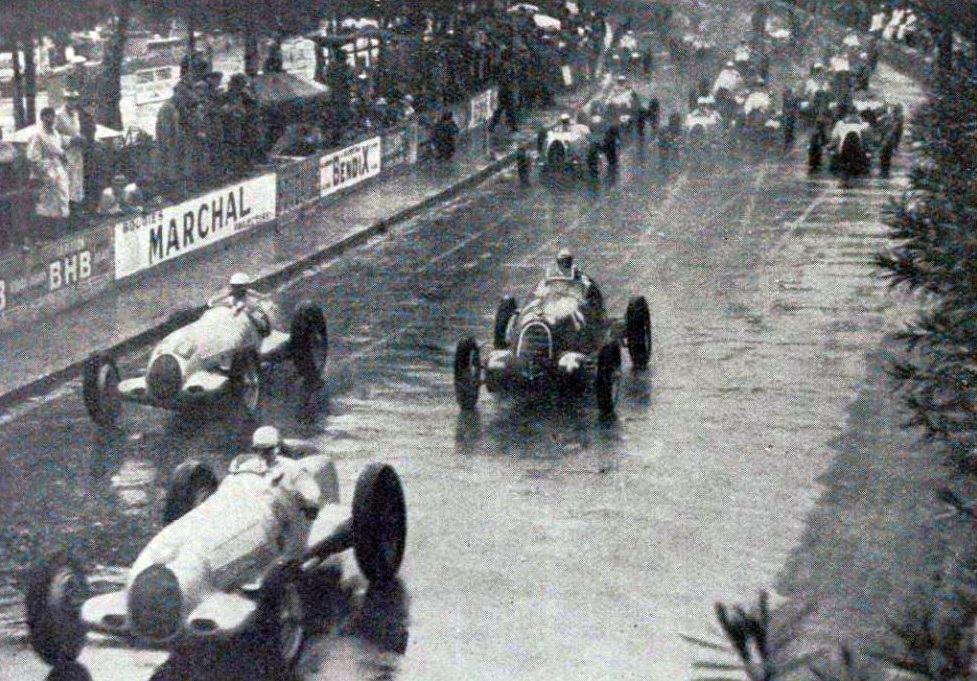
Caracciola (#8) beats Chiron (#10) & Nuvolari (#24) off the line at the start of the Monaco GP

As usual, the glamorous Monaco Grand Prix at Easter attracted a quality field including the five major teams. Mercedes-Benz had the new 4.7-litre kurz (short-wheelbase) car for Caracciola and Chiron, and last season's 4.3-litre W25 for Fagioli and von Brauchitsch. Auto Union also had a new model, the Type C, for their three drivers, Varzi, Stuck and Rosemeyer. Bugatti, traditionally strong at the tight city-circuit, had two works cars for Wimille and "Williams", using the nimble 3.3-litre Type 59. They also brought a single-seater Bugatti but it only ran in practice. The Italian teams were back in force. Ferrari had four of the 8C-35 cars, for Nuvolari, Brivio, Farina and Tadini, while the Maserati-supported Scuderia Torino had the older 6C-34 for Siena and Ghersi, and a V8-RI for Trossi, whose own radial-special was entered, but did not practice as it had a broken supercharger. Philippe Étancelin brought his own V8-RI and Raymond Sommer had his 3.2-litre P3. After a wet Thursday practice, Caracciola and Farina were the fastest on a dry Friday and took the front row. For the first time in its 8 years, the race was run in pouring rain. When Brivio's car was seen leaking oil on the grid, he was swapped into Tadini's Alfa. From the start, Nuvolari muscled his way to the lead at the first corner. Tadini was last away, leaving a long trail of oil mingling with the puddles until he pitted after 1 lap with a ruined engine. It was speculated by the press at the time that he had team instructions to do one lap to be eligible for the starting money. Caracciola led the first lap, metres ahead of Nuvolari and putting a gap on the rest. They lapped the crawling Tadini next time around, but when Chiron brought the field out of the tunnel, he hit the oil at the chicane and slid into the sandbags. The next few got through, but then successively Farina, Brivio and von Brauchitsch all skated off. Trossi came to a stop but was then able to squeeze through. As Caracciola eased off to allow course-workers to clear the carnage, Nuvolari blazed through the chicane and was able to close in again. One of the workers, while spreading sand to soak up the oil, accidentally threw some at Fagioli as he passed, who lost control and crashed his Mercedes at the chicane.

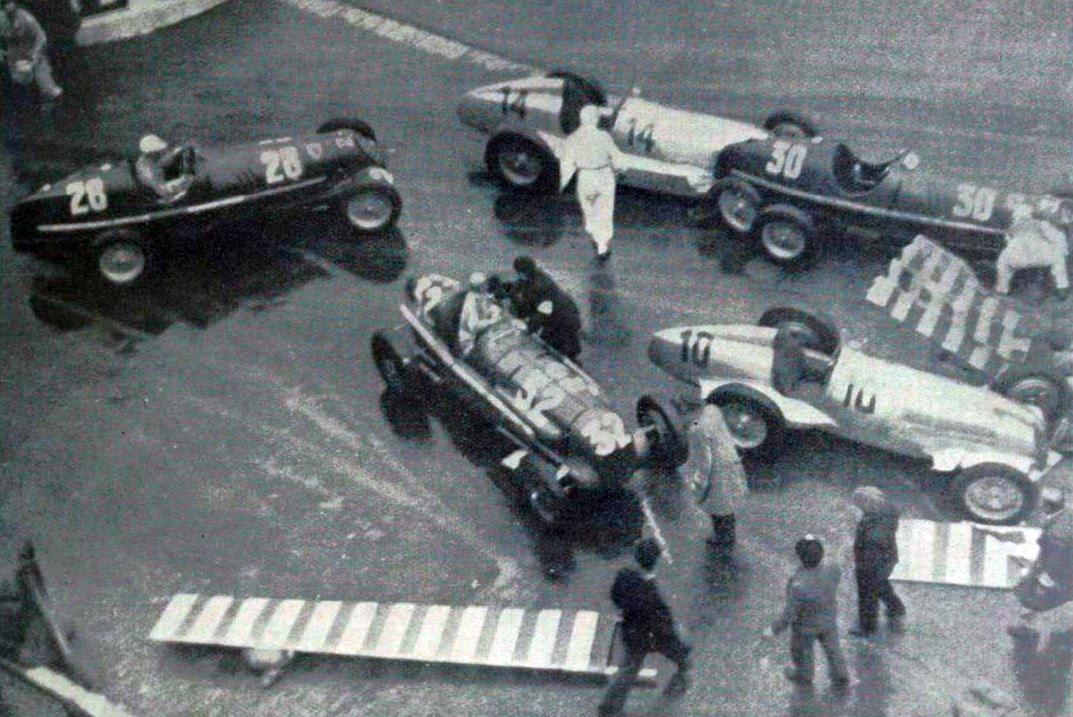
Monaco GP- 2nd lap chaos at the chicane with Chiron (#10), Farina (#30), von Brauchitsch (#14), Trossi (#32), Brivio (#28)

Meanwhile, Rosemeyer had pitted with a mis-revving engine and was quickly making up time on the wet track. However, going up the hill, he missed his braking and spun, slamming backwards into the roadside wall. So, after only 20 of the 100 laps, there were only 12 runners left – Nuvolari and Caracciola over a minute ahead of Varzi and Stuck. The rain returned in strength by lap 30 and the leading two put on a master class of wet-weather driving – Nuvolari doing four-wheel drift through the corners while Caracciola used his brilliant car-control to catch and then pass the Italian. As the rain washed and cleaned the track, Caracciola pulled away. Nuvolari was losing a lot of time as his petrol went down and the weight changed in his Alfa. When he pitted to refuel, he lost a lap. The pursuing Auto Unions were also thirsty and had to pit late in the race. Caracciola did not need to stop and took a superb victory in the difficult conditions ahead of Varzi with Stuck and Nuvolari a lap behind. On Saturday, a new voiturette race had been held as a support event. With another top field, it was dominated by ERAs and Maseratis, led by their works teams. Run to 50 laps, an early-race pile-up mixed up the field and when the works ERAs were afflicted by ignition problems, it became a contest between Tenni, in his works Maserati, and ERA of privateer Prince Bira. With his brakes failing, the pressure made Tenni overdo it and spin into the wall at the Gazometre hairpin, wrecking his steering. This left the Siamese driver a clear path to take his maiden victory, almost a lap ahead of Marcel Lehoux with ERAs sweeping the podium.

The next race was the exciting Tripoli Grand Prix at the very fast Mellaha track. The high temperatures and speed would put a premium on brakes and tyres. With the national lottery involved, it drew a big field with all the major teams, and a number of privateers. The German teams had the same drivers as at Monaco, although Mercedes now had the whole team in the new W25K. Ferrari had to draft in Carlo Pintacuda, as Farina had been injured at Monza testing the new 12C. In practice, the Mercedes drivers were finding their short-wheelbase cars very susceptible to the Ghibli winds and difficult to drive. Nuvolari had a major accident in practice when he went wide and hit a border stone. His Alfa Romeo rolled, throwing Nuvolari out. Taken to hospital, x-rays showed he had cracked two vertebrae. It was Rosemeyer, in his first appearance at the track, who took pole position with a lap three seconds faster than Chiron in second. It was a hot desert day for the race. Nuvolari arrived, heavily bandaged and in plaster ready to race, despite doctors' advice not to. From the front row, Stuck, Rosemeyer and Nuvolari jumped into the lead. When the leaders started pitting to change tyres after 10 of the 40 laps, the Mercedes team moved to the front until they too had to stop a few laps later. At half-distance, Stuck and Varzi were locked in a close duel. Rosemeyer had retired when his engine burst into flames. He joined a list of over half the field already out of the race. Most cars were making three stops to change their rear tyres. Auto Union team manager, Feuereissen, flagged his drivers to ease off to conserve theirs. Then on lap 33 Varzi suddenly dived for the pits to change a front tyre, losing 30 seconds. Stuck was commanded to slow down even more (doing laps around 20 seconds slower) to allow Varzi to catch up, and he caught and passed him on the penultimate lap. The Mercedes of Fagioli and Caracciola were almost a lap behind, ahead of the four Scuderia Ferrari Alfas – led home by Pintacuda. In his book, Neubauer said orders had come from Germany to let an Italian win the Italian race, much to the chagrin of Stuck, and the lottery ticket-holders. Varzi was humiliated at the after-race banquet when the Libyan governor, Marshall Balbo, proposed a toast to the "real winner", Hans Stuck (who verifies that in his autobiography as well). Afterward, Varzi's mistress, Ilse Pietsch, first introduced him to morphine to counter his depression.

A week later, the circus had moved along North Africa to the Carthage circuit in French Tunisia. Albeit with a smaller field of a dozen cars: only Caracciola and Chiron were there for Mercedes and at Ferrari, Nuvolari and Farina were still injured. Both the Scuderia Torino and Maremmana had returned to Italy; however, Bugatti did send Wimille in the Type 59. Once again, the Ghibli wind was proving a problem in practice. Rosemeyer and Varzi lined up on the front row of the grid, and it was the former who shot out into the lead. Chiron put in some very fast laps to lead the pursuit. On the ninth lap, Varzi was bearing down on Caracciola in third. Suddenly, on the main straight a wind-gust caught Varzi's car when he was racing at almost 250 km/h. The car slipped off the road, spun and tumbled end over end, disintegrating in the air. It was one of the most frightening accidents seen, but incredibly, Varzi was able to walk away, albeit very shaken from his amazing escape. After the fuel stops, Rosemeyer lost his lead with tyre problems. When Chiron retired with a broken fuel pump, and Rosemeyer suffered another carburettor fire, it left Caracciola with a comfortable two-lap lead to coast to an easy victory over Pintacuda, Wimille and Sommer – the only other finishers. It was Varzi's first serious accident in his decade of racing and consequently, he slipped further into morphine use as painkiller became addiction.

The Indianapolis 500 was held, as usual, at the end of May. Track owner, Eddie Rickenbacker, had done renovations on the circuit – widening the curves, flattening off the banking a bit and improving the safety fences around the walls to try and prevent cars flying off the track and going over the sides. To reduce increasing speeds, the AAA limited the total fuel to 37.5 gallons. Approaching the finish, 7 leading contenders ran themselves out of fuel. The winner was Louis Meyer, who became the first 3-time winner of the race. Despite efforts to reduce speed, Meyer won in a record time. He celebrated with a bottle of buttermilk, which has since become a winner's tradition. The race also saw the first time the new Borg-Warner Trophy was awarded.

=== Silver Arrows defeated ===
After a 3-week gap, the European teams came to a tense Barcelona for the Penya Rhin GP. Mercedes just had the two cars again, while Ferrari had three cars including a new 12C for Nuvolari, recovered after his crash at Tripoli. It was the first time the Auto Union team had attended, bringing three cars including a special short-wheelbase version at Varzi's suggestion. Their cars were held up by the Spanish railway strike until the team mechanics found them at a railway siding. Bugatti entered Wimille again and privateers Étancelin and Sommer were joined by Spaniard José de Villapadierna. In practice, Rosemeyer over-cooked his exit from the banked Font del Gat corner and slammed into a lamppost, knocking it over. The short Auto Union was proving almost undriveable and Varzi pulled rank and demanded Rosemeyer's car. When this was declined, he refused to drive – the team publicly saying he was still injured from his crash at Carthage. This all pointed to the end of his time at Auto Union. On a sunny race-day, there were eleven starters with reserve driver Ernst von Delius taking Varzi's place. Although Caracciola led initially, Nuvolari caught him on lap 7. Those two pulled away from the rest of the field; Rosemeyer was out with a loose, and leaking, fuel tank. Putting in lap-record times, by half-distance the leading pair were a lap ahead of the rest. On lap 60, Nuvolari had to pit to change a front tyre – quick enough to be still in the lead by 30 seconds. The Mercedes pit was flagging Caracciola to go faster and he responded, inexorably closing the margin. Although the Ferrari pit signalled Nuvolari to pit for his ruined rear tyres, the Italian carried on. He held on to the 80th lap for a thrilling win by a mere 3 seconds. Those two were in a class of their own, with Farina in third, a distant three laps down. If his victory the previous year at the Nürburgring was possibly considered fortunate, then this win was down to pure skill and speed. Two weeks later, Spain erupted into civil war and motor-racing ceased there for ten years.

A week of speed events was next, on two wheels and four, for the Eifelrennen. On the Sunday morning was the voiturette race. The month previous, Dick Seaman and his 1927 Delage had won the Light Car Race on the Isle of Man ahead of a swarm of ERAs. They all arrived at the Nürburgring for one of the premier 1.5-litre races of the season. The Maserati team had four cars entered with the new 6CM model for Trossi and the Hungarian Hartmann. There were also two local entries in the 750cc class: Bobby Kohlrausch had a new MG R-Type while Walter Bäumer had an Austin 7 loaned from the factory after his strong showing the week before at the recent Shelsley Walsh Speed Hill Climb (even beating Stuck and his Auto Union in the rain). After hot sunshine during practice, race-day had heavy rain. Seaman and Rüesch both slid off in the first lap. On the twisty circuit, in difficult conditions, the Maseratis had the measure of the ERAs and Trossi had an easy 1-2 with Tenni. Bira and Lehoux were next with Bäumer an impressive fifth in the little Austin. With AVUS being rebuilt and used in the upcoming Olympics, the main event of the Eifelrennen was the first showing for the season for the German teams in Germany, and they were there in force. Mercedes had four cars, although Faglioli did not arrive, and his place was taken by reserve driver Lang. Auto Union, likewise, had four cars with von Delius joining the regular trio. To combat this German might, Ferrari had four cars with both Nuvolari and Brivio now given the new 12C. The race was held after the voiturette race by which time the rain had eased to drizzle. In front of an estimated 300,000 spectators the grid lined up, the cars still allocated by ballot, with the teams then choosing which drivers to take which grid-slots. From the start, Caracciola darted from the third row to the front and led for the first 3 of 10 laps. However, in his haste he skated wide damaging the fragile suspension, retiring soon after. Nuvolari passed him and after an hour, (at half-distance), still led as the rain eased. Meanwhile, Rosemeyer had been putting in remarkable laps, and overtook the Alfa on lap 7 whereupon a heavy fog dropped over the circuit. As other drivers slowed to the conditions, Rosemeyer kept up his pace and took a fine victory, over two minutes ahead of the Alfas of Nuvolari, Brivio and Farina. Lang was the first Mercedes home, nearly six minutes back in fifth.

Just a week later, the teams moved east, across the border, for the inaugural Hungarian Grand Prix. Races had been planned in 1931, '32, and '34 but never eventuated. It was held on the roads of Népliget Park, the biggest green space in Budapest. Impressive race-organisation included modern electric timing using photocells, to give lap-times accurate to a tenth of a second. Unfortunately, very hot summer weather in the preceding week had melted the tar on the track and as soon as practice started, the surface started breaking up and became very slippery. In front of around 70-100,000 spectators, Rosemeyer took off from pole into the lead, soon with Caracciola in close pursuit. This was still the situation at half-distance (25 laps), with von Brauchitsch and Nuvolari closing in. Then, yet again, Caracciola's engine gave up on him, after Chiron's car was already out with a broken supercharger. Then on lap 30, von Brauchitsch spun off trying to lap Tadini's Alfa – whether tapped from behind by Nuvolari or sliding on the slippery surface is uncertain. Having got past, Nuvolari set about catching Rosemeyer and with his car handling far better on the tight track, he was able to pass him on lap 35. He then put in a new lap record to, once again, beat the German cars. Rosemeyer was second, and had to be lifted out of his car, with his hands bleeding from being torn up by the harsh steering. No Mercedes finished, as the unlucky von Brauchitsch retired with just two laps to go when the steering broke from his earlier off.

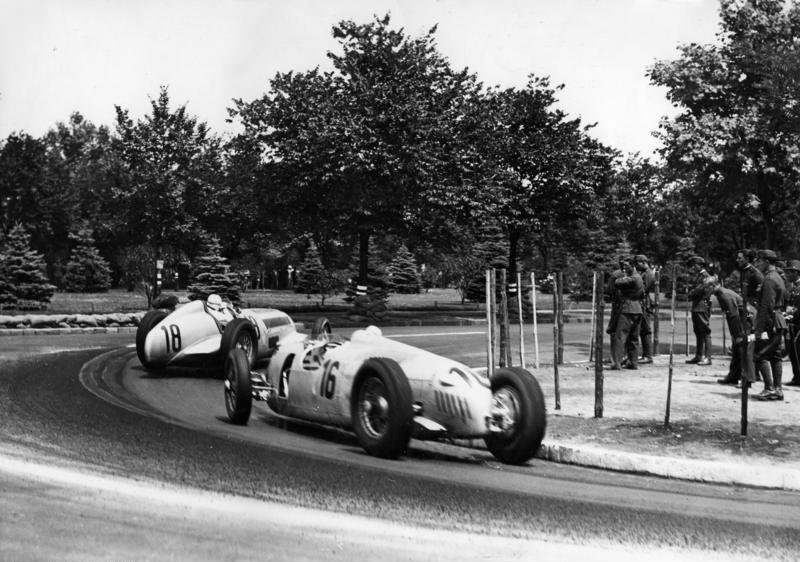
Rosemeyer (Auto Union) pursuing Caracciola (Mercedes) at the Hungarian GP

Despite his worsening team reputation, Varzi convinced the Auto Union team to enter him in the Milan GP, against the three Italian teams. It was yet another thrilling duel for the spectators between the two Italian masters and for the whole race, they were never more than fifteen seconds apart. In the end, it went the way of Nuvolari and his Alfa Romeo. Motor-racing attention, indirectly, then turned to France: the Le Mans 24-hours was postponed and eventually cancelled. The French Grand Prix and Marne Grand Prix were held on consecutive weekends to the new French sports-car regulations. Jean-Pierre Wimille in the new Bugatti Type 57G was unbeatable, and with Raymond Sommer as co-driver won at Monthlèry, then went on to win at Reims and St-Gaudens. Racing was growing in South America with regular Grands Prix held in Argentina and Brazil, all run to a mixed formula of European racing cars and American stock cars. European drivers were starting to travel to the continent in the summer break, often selling their cars to local drivers afterward, rather than bringing them home. This year, the São Paulo GP attracted Scuderia Ferrari – represented by Carlo Pintacuda and Attilio Marinoni. It also drew the popular French female racer, Hélène Delangle, who raced under the nom-de-plume "Hellé Nice". The Ferrari team-mates were clear favourites and when Pintacuda was allocated #12, in an act of sportsmanship he voluntarily swapped for #38 to start at the back of the grid alongside Marinoni. It took only three laps for him to get to the front of the field. The three Europeans were running 1-2-3 for most of the race, until with 8 laps to go, "Hellé-Nice" had to make a late pit-stop, dropping to 4th, behind leading Brazilian driver Manuel de Teffé and both driving Alfa Romeo Monzas. On the final lap, she caught him at the last corner. Both cars went wide, possibly touching at 160 km/h. The French woman's car jerked left, hitting the border straw-bales that sent it tumbling into the crowd pressing right up to the edge of the track. "Hellé-Nice" was thrown out and into the crowd. The terrible accident injured dozens and killed six spectators including a soldier who took the full impact of the driver hitting him. "Hellé-Nice" spent two months in hospital with a fractured skull.

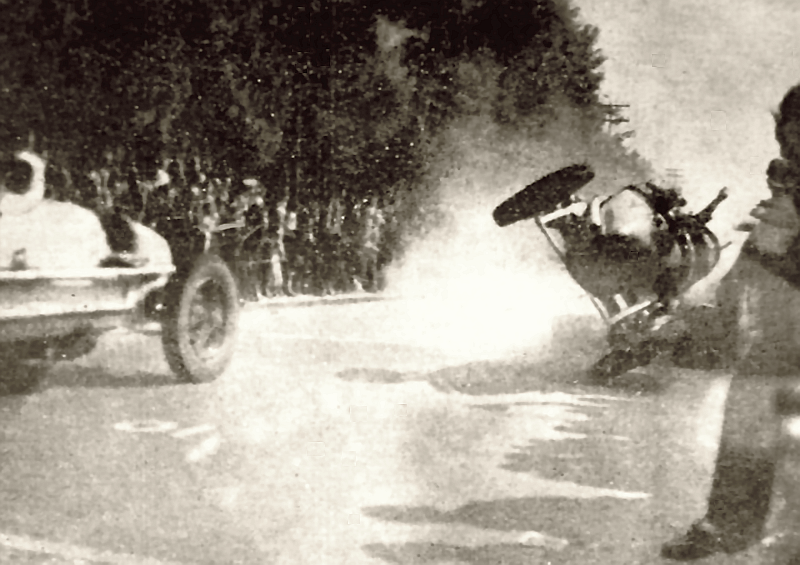
Moments before catastrophe: Hellé Nice losing control at the São Paulo GP

=== Second Half of the Season ===
In mid-July was another inaugural event – a rectangular street-circuit along the promenade of the Normandy resort town of Deauville. As a minor race, it was one of the few French races not run to their new sports-car formula. It attracted the best French drivers, led by Wimille and Robert Benoist from the works Bugatti team, along with top privateers Sommer and Étancelin. English drivers also came across the Channel, with Charlie Martin and Austin Dobson in their P3s along with Marcel Lehoux driving a works 2-litre ERA. Two bonus entries were René Dreyfus and Giuseppe Farina for Scuderia Ferrari. Despite a cold, overcast day, a big crowd arrived. Farina took the lead from the front row, but immediately there were problems. Dobson cut a corner and broke his suspension. Worse was Raymond Chambost, who had lost control of his Maserati 8CM which rolled. Taken to the local hospital with a fractured skull, he died three days later. Farina built his lead and had almost lapped the entire field by half-distance. Wimille was second and a lap ahead of Lehoux. On lap 60, Farina was approaching Lehoux to lap him again. Coming out of the corner onto the back straight Lehoux drifted wide and the two cars touched. Both rolled, throwing their drivers out, and with only cloth helmets, they both had head injuries. Lehoux was dead when they got to the hospital while Farina was released several days later. Only three cars finished and Wimille took a hollow victory.

The return to the Nürburgring for the German Grand Prix was the second round the European Championship. Just a fortnight earlier, Rosemeyer had married Elly Beinhorn in the celebrity wedding of the year. Once again, it was the most important event of the year for the German teams, and they dominated with nine of the twenty entries. Mercedes had their regular four and reserve driver Lang. Likewise, Auto Union brought in their reserve drivers Hasse and von Delius, as Varzi was sick. Against them was Ferrari with four cars: the 12C-36 for Nuvolari and Dreyfus (replacing the injured Farina) and 8C-35 for Brivio and Severi. The Scuderia Torino had two Maseratis, for Trossi and a V8-RI for guest driver Richard Seaman. Jean-Pierre Wimille was the sole entry from the Bugatti team. On the first day of practice, Rosemeyer put in a stunning lap of 10m 08s, fully 24 seconds under the lap record. This was then bettered the next day by Caracciola, with a 10m 03s – all due to the track resurfacing that had been done recently. However, grid positions were instead allocated by ballot. On a cool, overcast day, it was reported that there were about 350.000 spectators present. Using electric lights to start the race, von Brauchitsch on the second row was the fastest away, and led the first lap of 22. On the second lap, he stopped at the Karussel hairpin to check his steering, resuming after four minutes. Rosemeyer took over at the front, steadily building a lead until he pitted on lap 9. Hermann Lang found himself leading a Grand Prix for the first time as the field cycled through their pit-stops. Caracciola, having taken over Lang's car, brought it in smoking from a blown supercharger. Then, roaring down the straight toward Tiergarten, Chiron's Mercedes suddenly jerked left, crashing through a fence and rolled. Chiron was hauled out from under the car just with bruising to his head and shoulder (he would not race for Mercedes again). Nuvolari, running second, suffered a rear-axle failure at the Karussel, and was given a lift back to the pits on the back of Sommer's Alfa – no repeat of the 1935 victory. With his competition out of the race, the last lap was the chance for Rosemeyer to receive the plaudits of an adoring crowd. He finished four minutes ahead of team-mate Stuck with Brivio almost five minutes further back in third.

For Mercedes, their race had been a disaster, never being on the pace. The team chose to take time to work on the new car in development. So the Coppa Ciano, the next major event of the calendar, was effectively a two-way duel between Alfa Romeo and Auto Union. This year the race was not run over the full 20 km Montenero course. Owing to safety concerns with the powerful cars, the twisty, narrow mountain section was omitted for an abbreviated 7 km coastal course around the streets of Livorno. After travelling barely metres off the start-line, Nuvolari was out with a broken differential. Pintacuda was called in to hand his car over. Varzi dominated the early race until his rear brake started locking, forcing his eventual retirement. In the meantime, Nuvolari had made up the minute he was behind and with inspired driving, took the lead. Rosemeyer was having an off-day, concerned about his wife embarking on an endurance flight attempt, and handed over to Stuck. Nuvolari was untouchable and, to the delight of the partisan crowd, led home a Ferrari 1-2-3 to once again beat the German team. It would prove to be the final time that Alfa Romeo beat either of the German teams. In the voiturette race earlier in the day, Trossi has convincingly won for Maserati after Seaman had fuel-pump issues in his Delage. Nicholas Embiricos, in his privateer ERA, was second.

The next track, at Pescara, was far more suited to the raw power of the Auto Unions with its long straights. So the organisers inserted chicanes onto those, to break up the speeds. Both Ferrari and Auto Union brought four cars. Scuderia Torino also entered four Maseratis, although only Seaman and Ghersi arrived. Clemente Biondetti represented the Scuderia Marammana with a Maserati 8CM, while privateers Hans Rüesch and Austin Dobson brought their Alfa P3s. Varzi put in the best time, with a 10m59s, to take pole with Nuvolari (11m06s) and Brivio (11m10s) beside him, for Ferrari. The best Maserati was Ghersi with a distant 12m23s. Near the end of practice, Stuck had a big accident. Breaking heavily from 280 kph at the Capelle chicane, the car slapped a stone wall and slid down a slope. Stuck was thrown out and fortunate only to bruise his elbow from a heavy landing. The car was repaired overnight for Delius to drive, while Varzi's car needed a full engine-change. It was a hot, sunny day and 80,000 fans arrived for the race. The voiturette race was run at 8am. Seaman was doing double-duty, having his revenge and winning after a mid-race tussle with Trossi, who finished second, and Bira. In the main race, Nuvolari got a lightning start, and together with Varzi and Rosemeyer, soon distanced the field. Varzi had to pit on lap 4 when a stone smashed his windscreen and the wind-buffeting at speed made driving impossible. Rosemeyer passed Nuvolari for the lead at Villa Montani, as they entered the twisty uphill part of the circuit. Delius was third, just ahead of Brivio, but 3 minutes behind, after an hour. At half-distance (8 laps), the cars stopped to refuel. Varzi was absolutely flying now, putting in a 10m44s race lap, and reaching 285 kph in the timed kilometre. When Nuvolari retired in the hills with a broken engine on lap 11, it left Auto Union to take a sweep of the podium, with Rosemeyer beating Delius and Varzi home by over six minutes. Brivio was fourth and Rüesch, four laps behind, was the only other finisher of the twelve starters.

The third Swiss Grand Prix was the next race of the European Championship and, for that reason, the Mercedes team was in the entry list with four cars. Auto Union also had four cars, with reserve Hasse called in place of von Delius. Ferrari just had three entries – for Nuvolari, Farina and Dreyfus. Bugatti brought two models for Wimille, with a 3.3-litre Type 59 and a 4.7-litre Type 59/50B. Caracciola was fastest in practice and started on pole. Getting away first, he was hounded by Rosemeyer as they pulled away from the rest of the field. Caracciola did everything to keep his lead, despite having waved flags to let the Auto Union pass. After nine laps, and furious shaken fists from Rosemeyer, it took the intervention of the lead official to flag Caracciola to pull over. Nuvolari had been third, but was falling back through the field with his engine overheating. Caracciola started having a stuck throttle, and was turning the ignition off and on to manage it. Rosemeyer, meanwhile, was setting new lap records and had even lapped his team-mate Stuck. In a race of high mechanical attrition, there were only five finishers, including the whole Auto Union team, cementing their dominance. Rosemeyer won, ahead of Varzi and Stuck, with only the Mercedes of Lang in 4th (co-driven by Faglioli) breaking up the Saxon procession Later that evening, tempers between the two Germans were still high and an unseemly shouting match erupted in their hotel lobby. The two would not speak to each other for the rest of the year. In response to their ongoing poor performance, the Mercedes team officially withdrew from the rest of the season to concentrate on their 1937 car.

In the Berne Grand Prix for the voiturette class, the Maserati works team did not appear. Dick Seaman dominated the race, winning ahead of the privateer ERAs of Embiricos and Reggie Tongue. Bira had retired from second with engine issues and the works ERA team had another wretched day, never being competitive. A week later, the British Junior Car Club revived their "200 Mile" race, this time at the Donington Park circuit. Voiturettes were run alongside Grand Prix cars, and easily had their measure. This time the ERA team was far more competitive, with Fairfield taking pole position in practice and Earl Howe initially leading the field. However, his car needed to refuel but the Delage did not, and Seaman went on to claim his third victory in three weeks, with Howe second. The only Grand Prix car to be classified was the Maserati 8CM of Cholmondeley-Tapper, with the rest a number of laps behind and outside the mandatory ten-minute time-limit. The following weekend, at the Ards Circuit in Northern Ireland, Jack Chambers crashed into the crowd during the RAC Tourist Trophy sports car race. Eight people were killed and fifteen seriously injured in the worst motor-racing accident in British history.

=== The Italian GP and the end of season ===
The Italian Grand Prix was the fourth and final event in the abbreviated European Championship. Once again there were no privateers entered, only cars from the racing teams. As usual, Auto Union had their four drivers, including von Delius this time. To defend Italian honour, the Scuderia Ferrari now had four of the 12C-36 cars for Nuvolari, Brivio, Farina and Dreyfus. Maserati was represented by the Scuderia Torino (with a V8-RI for Trossi and an older 6C-34 for Piero Dusio) and the Scuderia Marammana (with a pair of the 6C-34s for Biondetti and Ghersi). Bugatti could not prepare the car after the Swiss Grand Prix. The officials decided to use the same circuit as the previous year, with the five chicanes to try and limit the car speeds. The track employed most of the road circuit before connecting onto the banked Curva Sud. After their engine issues in the previous races, Vittorio Jano and his Alfa Romeo engineers had worked for a fortnight at Monza. They found by enlarging the exhaust pipes and fitting larger oil coolers, the engine cooling could be controlled. However, during practice, Brivio misjudged the chicane at the Curva della Roggia and rolled the car. It took almost ten minutes for the Alfa team to notice he had not come around and then with the help of the Auto Union crew, they found him still stuck under the car. Stunned and with a bruised arm, he was checked over at the local hospital. His place for the Grand Prix would be taken by Pintacuda, driving one of the older 8C-35s. Two unusual occurrences happened during practice – Rosemeyer was invited by Alfa Romeo to test-drive their 12C-36, and his new wife, Elly Beinhorn, did a lap in the Auto Union (at a reasonable speed).

Rosemeyer had taken pole and shared the front row with Stuck and Nuvolari. At the start, it was Stuck who took the lead until overtaken by Rosemeyer on the 4th lap. Nuvolari set a new lap record when he moved up to second. Varzi's car was losing power from a lost cylinder, dropping him down the field. He pitted, and fed up with the car, refused to go back out, so Hasse took his place three laps behind. On lap 18, Nuvolari lapped Trossi in his Maserati. Stuck, just two seconds behind, tried to follow before the Curva del Vialone chicane, but the pass put him offline and beyond his breaking point. Stuck hit the inner curb and then speared across the track. The car smashed into a tree and rebounded back onto the circuit, beside the driver who had been thrown out like a rag-doll. The following Trossi and Delius pulled up in time, with the track blocked. Stuck, despite a concussion, had amazingly only received superficial grazes and bruises. The race carried on, through the first pit-stops without further change. Trossi stopped with a loose fuel tank and after 40 minutes, was relieved by Bianco who proceeded to be a mobile roadblock for the rest of the field. When Nuvolari and Dreyfus had to change tyres a second time, Rosemeyer had the race in the bag and was able to ease off to win the race. Nuvolari was second, two minutes behind with Delius two laps back in third. Rosemeyer, having won three of the four rounds, was crowned European Champion. For Stuck, his season was over, but he was able to recuperate as a guest of fellow-driver, Conte Giovanni "Johnny" Lurani. The season ended with an easy victory for Nuvolari at the local Modena GP, as Ferrari dominated the other two Italian Scuderia. The second Donington Grand Prix had an interesting combination between Alfa Romeos, the new French sports cars and the leading voiturettes. In a 4½-hour race, it was the pair of Dick Seaman and Hans Ruësch, in their Alfa 8C-35 that won, ahead of Charlie Martin's Tipo B and the privateer ERA of Peter Walker and Peter Whitehead.

Since the 1920s, the American and European racing fraternities had moved apart following separate paths. Prior to that, there had been trans-Atlantic travel from the top European drivers to participate in the Indianapolis 500 and Vanderbilt Cup. To try and re-establish inter-continental racing, George Vanderbilt, nephew of the race founder, sponsored a return of the Cup. For a time the races had been run on a street circuit on Long Island. The new, combined road and dirt track at the Roosevelt Raceway, built with the help of Eddie Rickenbacker, used the Roosevelt Field runway where Lindbergh had famously left on his 1927 Transatlantic flight. The idea was to run the best of AAA series against the current European grand-prix cars. It had been postponed from 4 July as the circuit was not ready. Their season having finished, and with the big cash prizes, it drew an entry from Scuderia Ferrari for Nuvolari, Brivio and Farina with 12C-36s and privateer Raymond Sommer had his Tipo B. Bugatti had a Type 59/50 for Wimille, Maserati V8RIs were entered by Étancelin and "Raph" while Fred McEvoy and Englishman Teddy Rayson had voiturettes. Joining them were three ERAs, privately entered for Earl Howe, Pat Fairfield and Baron Essendon. A huge field of 58 cars arrived, and qualifying was needed for the 45 starter places. Ranged against the Europeans were some of the best Indy-style oval racers. These included 1934 Indianapolis winner Bill Cummings, veterans Russ Snowberger, Tony Gulotta and Shorty Cantlon, as well as future legends Wilbur Shaw, Mauri Rose and Ted Horn. This year's Indianapolis 500 winner, Louis Meyer, took Essendon's Bugatti T59 out for a test-drive, but crashed it in practice. Most were driving unsupercharged Miller or Offenhauser-powered roadsters, and after practice it was readily apparent there was a significant performance gap between the two types. Off the front row, Billy Winn got the best start, but Nuvolari was leading after the first lap. On lap 4, Wilbur Shaw spun out, bringing on the first yellow flag for the field. After an hour (about 15 laps), Nuvolari had a 30-second lead over Brivio, with Winn and Farina next and Wimille fifth in the Bugatti. Farina went wide at a corner and crashed, and another yellow came out. This full-course yellow was standard action in the United States, but quite unknown to the Europeans and many passed under the yellow flags and were penalised accordingly. With so many cars on the track, and the American cars being lapped, it was getting more confusing for the crowd. The leading order stayed constant aside from pit-stops. The ERAs were climbing up the order against the bigger-engined cars with Fairfield and Howe in the top-10. Then, on lap 64, Winn retired when his rear axle failed and with it, the American hopes of a win were lost. Even with his Alfa running on 11-cylinders, Nuvolari continued on to take an easy victory, two laps ahead of Wimille in his Bugatti. Brivio had suffered a cracked fuel pipe and lost ten minutes in repairs, slipping down to third. Fourth was Sommer in his private Alfa with Fairfield a credible fifth, 40 seconds ahead of the McEvoy/Trossi Maserati. First American home was Bill Cummings in 7th, fully 25 minutes behind Nuvolari. Built for simple cornering, the American cars had been well outclassed. After the race, Sommer sold his Alfa Romeo Tipo B to Joel Thorne.

The season was highly successful for Auto union, particularly in comparison to Mercedes. it also marked the emergence of Bernd Rosemeyer as aleading driver, a rise that was widely publicized at the time, including by state media in Germany. Alfa Romeo achieved occasional strong results, with Tazio Nuvolari delivering notable performance and was generally competitive in events where the German teams did not participate.

However, the year was also marked by several serious accidents. Incidents at Sao Paulo, Deauville and the Tourist Trophy resulted in cars leaving the track and entering spectator area, reflecting the limited safety standards of the era. At the time, crowd control and circuit safety measures were significantly less developed than in modern motorsports, which contributed to the severity of these events for both drivers and spectators.

== Race Results ==
=== Drivers' Race Results ===
| Pos | Driver | Team | MON (Monaco) | GER (Germany) | SUI (Switzerland) | ITA (Italy) | Pts | TRI (Libya) | TUN (Tunisia) | PYR (Spain) | EIF (Germany) | HUN (Hungary) | CCN (Italy) | CAC (Italy) |
|---|---|---|---|---|---|---|---|---|---|---|---|---|---|---|
| 1 | (Germany) Bernd Rosemeyer | Auto Union AG | Ret | 1 | 1 | **1** | 10 | **Ret** | **Ret** | 5 | 1 | **2** | **4** | 1 |
| 2 | (Germany) Hans Stuck | Auto Union AG | 3 | 2 | 3 | Ret | 15 | 2 | Ret | DNS | 8 | 4 | Ret [4] | DNS |
| 3 | (Italy) Tazio Nuvolari | Scuderia Ferrari | 4 | Ret | Ret | 2 | 17 | 8 | | 1 | 2 | 1 | Ret [1] | Ret |
| 4 | (Italy) Achille Varzi | Auto Union AG | 2 | | 2 | Ret | 19 | 1 | Ret | DNS | 7 | 3 | **Ret** | **3** |
| 5 | (France) Raymond Sommer | Private Entry | 7 | 9 | Ret | | 21 | Ret | 4 | 7 | | | | |
| 6 | (Germany) Rudolf Caracciola | Daimler-Benz AG | 1 | Ret [5] | **Ret** | | 22 | 4 | 1 | 2 | Ret | Ret | - | - |
| 7 | (Italy) Antonio Brivio | Scuderia Ferrari | 5 | 3 | | DNS | 23 | 7 | Ret | Ret | 3 | | 2 | 4 |
| = | (Germany) Ernst von Delius | Auto Union AG | DNS | 6 | [5] | 3 | 23 | | | 4 | 9 | [5] | | 2 |
| = | (Italy) Carlo Felice Trossi | Scuderia Torino | Ret | 8 | | 7 | 23 | | | | | DNS | | |
| 10 | (Germany) Rudolf Hasse | Auto Union AG | | 4 | 5 | [DNF] | 24 | | | | DNS | | | |
| = | (France) René Dreyfus | Scuderia Ferrari | | Ret | Ret | 4 | 24 | | | | | | 3 | Ret |
| = | (Germany) Manfred von Brauchitsch | Daimler-Benz AG | Ret | 7 | Ret | | 24 | Ret | | | Ret | Ret | - | - |
| 13 | (Germany) Hermann Lang | Daimler-Benz AG | | [7] | Ret | | 25 | DNS | Res | Res | 5 | Res | | |
| 14 | (Italy) Luigi Fagioli | Daimler-Benz AG | Ret | 5 | Ret [4] | | 26 | 3 | | | | | - | - |
| = | (France) Jean-Pierre Wimille | Automobiles Ettore Bugatti | 6 | Ret | Ret | | 26 | | 3 | Ret | | | | |
| = | (Italy) Giuseppe Farina | Scuderia Ferrari | Ret [5] | | Ret | Ret | 26 | | | 3 | 4 | | | Ret |
| 17 | (Italy) Pietro Ghersi | Scuderia Torino; Scuderia Maremmana | 8 | | | Ret | 27 | Ret | | | | | Ret | Ret |
| 18 | (Italy) Carlo Pintacuda | Scuderia Ferrari | | | | 5 | 28 | 5 | 2 | | | | 1 | |
| = | (Italy) Piero Dusio | Scuderia Torino | | | | 6 | 28 | | | | | | | |
| = | (United Kingdom) William Grover-Williams | Automobiles Ettore Bugatti | 9 | | | | 28 | | | | | | | |
| = | (New Zealand) / (United Kingdom) Thomas Cholmondeley-Tapper | Private Entry | | 10 | | | 28 | | | | | | | |
| = | (Italy) Francesco Severi | Scuderia Ferrari; Scuderia Maremmana | | Ret | | | 28 | Ret | | Res | Ret | | Res | |
| = | (Monaco) Louis Chiron | Daimler-Benz AG | **Ret** | Ret | Res | | 28 | 9 | Ret | 6 | 6 | Ret | - | - |
| = | (France) Philippe Étancelin | Private Entry | Ret | | Ret | | 28 | Ret | Ret | Ret | | | | |
| 25 | (Italy) Clemente Biondetti | Scuderia Maremmana | | | Ret | Ret | 29 | | | | | | Ret | Ret |
| 26 | (Netherlands) Johannes Rens | Private Entry | | Ret | | | 30 | | | | DNS | | | |
| = | (United Kingdom) Earl Howe | Private Entry | | | Ret | | 30 | | | | | | | |
| 28 | (Italy) Mario Tadini | Scuderia Ferrari | Ret | | | | 31 | 6 | | | | 4 | | |
| = | (Italy) Eugenio Siena | Scuderia Torino | Ret | | | | 31 | Ret | | | | | | |
| = | (Chile) Juan Zanelli | Scuderia Villapadierna; Private Entry | | Ret | | | 31 | | | | 10 | | | Ret |
| = | (United Kingdom) Richard Seaman | Scuderia Torino | | Ret [8] | | | 31 | | | | | | | Ret |
| = | (Switzerland) Jacques de Rham | Private Entry | | | Ret | | 31 | | | | | | | |
| | (Switzerland) Hans Rüesch | Private Entry | | | DNS | | | Ret | | | | | | 5 |
| | (Italy) Giosuè Calamai | Private Entry | | | | | | | | | | | 5 | |
| | (United Kingdom) Austin Dobson | Scuderia Torino | | | | | | | | | | 6 | | Ret |
| Pos | Driver | Team | 1 (Monaco) | 2 (Germany) | 3 (Switzerland) | 4 (Italy) | Pts | A (Libya) | B (Tunisia) | C (Spain) | D (Germany) | E (Hungary) | F (Italy) | G (Italy) |

Bold font indicates starting on pole position, while italics show the driver of the race's fastest lap.
The results of reserve or relieving drivers are shown with [square brackets]
All drivers who started a Championship race are shown, while only those drivers with a best finish of 6th or better in the non-Championship races, or a fastest lap, are shown. Sources:

=== Manufacturers' Race Results ===
| Pos | Manufacturer | MON (Monaco) | GER (Germany) | SUI (Switzerland) | ITA (Italy) | Pts | TRI (Libya) | TUN (Tunisia) | PYR (Spain) | EIF (Germany) | HUN (Hungary) | CCN (Italy) | CAC (Italy) |
|---|---|---|---|---|---|---|---|---|---|---|---|---|---|
| | (Germany) Auto Union | 2 | 1 | 1 | 1 | | 1 | Ret | 4 | 1 | 2 | 4 | 1 |
| | (Italy) Alfa Romeo | 4 | 3 | Ret | 2 | | 5 | 2 | 1 | 2 | 1 | 1 | 4 |
| | (Germany) Mercedes-Benz | 1 | 5 | 4 | | | 3 | 1 | 2 | 5 | Ret | | |
| | (Italy) Maserati | 8 | 8 | Ret | 6 | | Ret | Ret | Ret | 10 | 7 | Ret | Ret |
| | (France) Bugatti | 6 | Ret | Ret | | | | 3 | Ret | | | | |

| Colour | Result | Points |
|---|---|---|
| Gold | Winner | 1 |
| Silver | 2nd place | 2 |
| Bronze | 3rd place | 3 |
| Green | Completed more than 75% | 4 |
| Blue | Completed between 50% and 75% | 5 |
| Purple | Completed between 25% and 50% | 6 |
| Red | Completed less than 25% | 7 |
| Black | Disqualified | 8 |
| Blank | Did not participate | 8 |

Footnotes

Citations
