= Piero Dusio =

Italian footballer and racing driver (1899–1975)

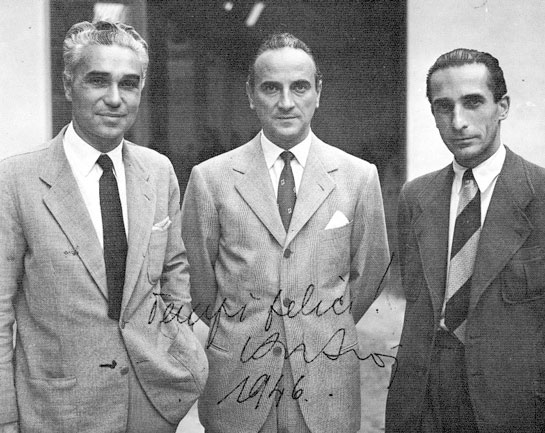
- Piero Dusio in the middle, flanked by Piero Taruffi (left) and Giovanni Savonuzzi (right)
- Born: 13 October 1899; Scurzolengo d'Asti, Piedmont, Italy
- Died: 7 November 1975 (aged 76); Victoria, Buenos Aires, Argentina

Formula One World Championship career
- Nationality: (Italy) Italian
- Active years: 1952
- Team: Cisitalia
- Entries: 1 (0 starts)
- Championships: 0
- Wins: 0
- Podiums: 0
- Career points: 0
- Pole positions: 0
- Fastest laps: 0
- First entry: 1952 Italian Grand Prix

Piero Dusio (13 October 1899 – 7 November 1975) was an Italian footballer, businessman, racing driver and racing car manufacturer.

== Biography ==
=== Football career ===
Dusio was born in Scurzolengo, province of Asti, in Piedmont. A promising footballer, he played as a midfielder and made three appearances for Juventus in 1921–22. After his football career ended due to a knee injury, Dusio started a textile business which expanded into manufacturing sport equipment and supplying military uniforms. His association with football continued in a managerial role. In 1941, he founded Juventus Organizzazione Sportiva Anonima (O.S.A.), an organization he ran until 1943. In 1942, Dusio was appointed president of Juventus. He resigned from the post in 1948 to move to Argentina.

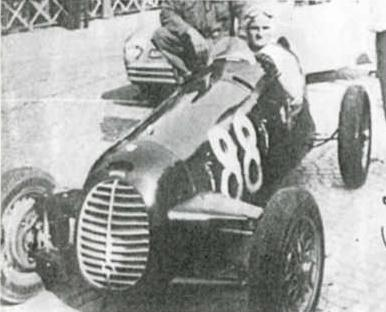
The Cisitalia D46 was named after Piero Dusio (the Dusio 46). The racecar driver is Ilario Bandini.

=== Racing career ===
In 1929, Dusio made his racing debut at the Mille Miglia. He would compete until 1938, his best results being a class victory in a Siata 500cc in 1937. In 1936 he established the Scuderia Torino and took part in the 1936 Italian Grand Prix at the wheel of a Maserati 6C-34, finishing sixth behind Bernd Rosemeyer, Tazio Nuvolari, Ernst von Delius, René Dreyfus and Carlo Pintacuda.

=== Team owner ===
In 1944, at the end of World War II, Dusio switched his focus to his racing team. He commissioned Dante Giacosa of Fiat to develop a racing car and founded the "Consorzio Industriale Sportiva Italia", later known as Cisitalia. The team's collaborators included Carlo Abarth, Rudolf Hruska and Ferry Porsche. Three D46's topped the Coppa Brezzi (a race held together with the 1946 Turin Grand Prix), with Dusio finishing 1st.

Dusio continued financing his racing car projects, but the expenses in engineering the complex 202MM almost bankrupted Cisitalia in 1947. Consequently, Dusio moved to Argentina and established Autoar (Automotores Argentinos) S.A.I.C. (22 March 1949), an enterprise financially supported by Juan Peron. Aldo Brovarone joined Dusio in Argentina to work for the company. Dusio's son, Carlo, stayed in Turin to restructure Cisitalia, and ran the company with his father until 1964. In 1960 Dusio started Cisitalia Argentina Industrial y Comercial SA in Buenos Aires, where he built cars such as the Cisitalia 750 (1960).

Dusio tried to qualify for one Formula One World Championship Grand Prix (Italy 1952) with a Cisitalia D46, but failed to set a time in practice due to engine problems.

Dusio died in Buenos Aires in 1975.

== Racing record ==
=== Complete European Championship results ===
(key) (Races in bold indicate pole position) (Races in italics indicate fastest lap)

Year	Entrant	Chassis	Engine	1	2	3	4	5	6	7	EDC	Pts
1935	Scuderia Subalpina	Maserati 8CM	Maserati 3.0 L8	MON; Ret	FRA	BEL	GER	SUI	ITA	ESP	32nd	55
1936	Scuderia Torino	Maserati 6C-34	Maserati 3.7 L6	MON	GER	SUI	ITA; 6				18th	28

=== Complete Formula One World Championship results ===
(key) (Races in bold indicate pole position, races in italics indicate fastest lap)

Year	Entrant	Chassis	Engine	1	2	3	4	5	6	7	8	WDC	Pts
1952	Piero Dusio	Cisitalia D46	BPM 2.0 L4	SUI	500	BEL	FRA	GBR	GER	NED	ITA; DNQ	NC	0
