= 1936 Italian Grand Prix =

- Race 4 of 4 in the 1936 European Championship

Race details
- Date: 13 September 1936
- Official name: XIV Gran Premio d'Italia
- Location: Autodromo Nazionale di Monza; Monza, Italy
- Course: Permanent racing facility
- Course length: 6.95 km (4.32 miles)
- Distance: 72 laps, 500.40 km (311.04 miles)

Pole position
| Driver | (Germany) Bernd Rosemeyer | Auto Union |
- Time: 2:56.4

Fastest lap
| Driver | (Germany) Bernd Rosemeyer | Auto Union |
- Time: 2:59.6

Podium
| First | (Germany) Bernd Rosemeyer | Auto Union |
| Second | (Italy) Tazio Nuvolari | Alfa Romeo |
| Third | (Germany) Ernst von Delius | Auto Union |

The 1936 Italian Grand Prix was a Grand Prix motor race held at Monza on 13 September 1936. The 72 lap event was won by Bernd Rosemeyer.

== Classification ==
| Pos | No | Driver | Team | Car | Laps | Time/Retired | Grid | Points |
|---|---|---|---|---|---|---|---|---|
| 1 | 4 | (Germany) Bernd Rosemeyer | Auto Union | Auto Union C | 72 | 3:43:25.0 | 1 | 1 |
| 2 | 18 | (Italy) Tazio Nuvolari | Scuderia Ferrari | Alfa Romeo 12C-36 | 72 | +2:05.3 | 3 | 2 |
| 3 | 8 | (Germany) Ernst von Delius | Auto Union | Auto Union C | 70 | +2 Laps | 4 | 3 |
| 4 | 24 | (France) René Dreyfus | Scuderia Ferrari | Alfa Romeo 12C-36 | 70 | +2 Laps | 8 | 4 |
| 5 | 20 | (Italy) Carlo Pintacuda | Scuderia Ferrari | Alfa Romeo 8C-35 | 68 | +4 Laps | 7 | 4 |
| 6 | 16 | (Italy) Piero Dusio | Scuderia Torino | Maserati 6C-34 | 59 | +13 Laps | 10 | 4 |
| DNF | 22 | (Italy) Giuseppe Farina | Scuderia Ferrari | Alfa Romeo C | 57 | Mechanical | 6 | 4 |
| 7 | 10 | (Italy) Carlo Felice Trossi | Scuderia Torino | Maserati V8RI | 49 | +23 Laps | 9 | 5 |
| 7 | 10 | (Italy) Ettore Bianco | Scuderia Torino | Maserati V8RI | 49 | +23 Laps | 9 | n/a |
| DNF | 12 | (Italy) Clemente Biondetti | Scuderia Maremmana | Maserati 6C-34 | 30 | | 11 | 6 |
| DNF | 6 | (Italy) Achille Varzi | Auto Union | Auto Union C | 17 | Engine | 5 | 7 |
| DNF | 6 | (Germany) Rudolf Hasse | Auto Union | Auto Union C | 17 | Engine | 5 | n/a |
| DNF | 2 | (Germany) Hans Stuck | Auto Union | Auto Union C | 17 | Accident | 2 | 7 |
| DNF | 14 | (Italy) Pietro Ghersi | Scuderia Maremmana | Maserati 6C-34 | 2 | | 12 | 7 |

Grand Prix Race
| Previous race: 1936 Swiss Grand Prix | 1936 Grand Prix season Grandes Épreuves | Next race: 1937 Belgian Grand Prix |
| Previous race: 1935 Italian Grand Prix | Italian Grand Prix | Next race: 1937 Italian Grand Prix |
