= Giovanni Alloatti =

Italian racing driver

Giovanni Alloatti (Turin, Italy – 9 June 1934, Palermo, Italy) was an Italian racing driver. He drove six races between 1926 and 1934 of which he won two. His last race, the 1934 Targa Florio, was run in bad weather and Alloatti went over a bridge parapet on a train bridge. He succumbed to his injuries 20 days later.

== Results ==
Year	Date	Race	Entrant	Car	Teammate(s)	Result
1926	4 April	Formula Libre Grand Prix of Alessandria	-	Bugatti	-	1st
1929	2 June	Circuito del Pozzo, Verona	Pugno	Bugatti	none	1st
1933	30 April	IX Circuito Pietro Bordino, Alessandria	Giovanni Alloatti	Bugatti T51	none	DNF
1934	8 April	Mille Miglia	-	Alfa Romeo 8C 2300	Gino Rovere	DNS
1934	22 April	X Circuito Pietro Bordino, Alessandria	Giovanni Alloatti	Bugatti T35B	none	DNF
1934	20 May	XXV Targa Florio	Giovanni Alloatti	Bugatti T35B	none	DNF (Fatal Crash)
