= Bill Everitt =

Bill Everitt may refer to:

- Bill Everitt (baseball) (1868–1938), Major League Baseball player
- Bill Everitt (racing driver) (1901–1993), MG race car driver
