= Ippolito Berrone =

Italian racing driver

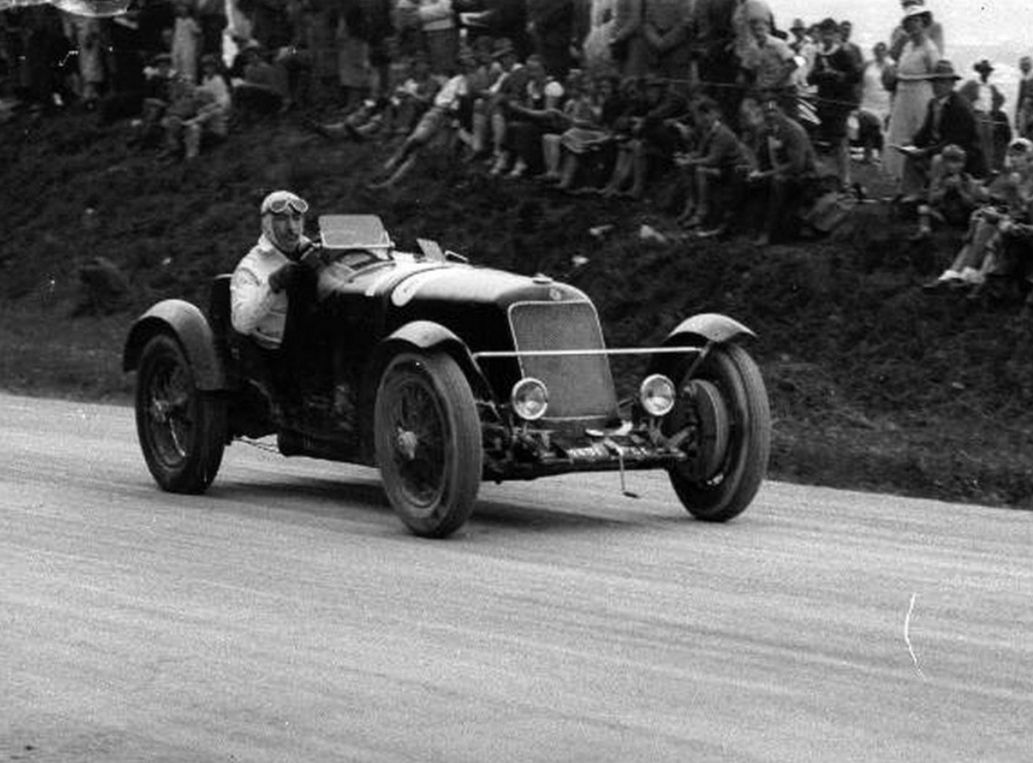
Berrone wins the 1.5 litre Sports car class in a Maserati 4CS at the Gaisberg hillclimb event on 2 July 1933

Ippolito Berrone (1901-72) was a racing driver born in Genova, Italy. He entered 13 races between 1933 and 1939 (9 started), of which he won two, in Maseratis, Alfa Romeos and Lancias. Berrone was one of the Maserati brothers' most valued customers so they loaned him an 1100cc works OSCA for a one-off return in 1950 for the Pontedecimo-Giovi hillclimb.

Year	Date	Race	Entrant	Car	Teammate(s)	Result
1933	March 31	Parma-Poggio di Berceto	Scuderia Ferrari	Maserati 4CM	-	-
1933	April 9	Mille Miglia	Scuderia Ferrari	Alfa Romeo 6C 1500 SS	Guglielmo Carraroli	16th
1933	September 10	VI Gran Premio di Monza	Ippolito Berrone	Maserati 4CM	none	DNS
1934	April 8	Mille Miglia	-	Maserati 4CS	P. Bortolini	DNF
1934	May 13	III Eläintarhanajot (III Djurgårdsloppet in Swedish) (Suomen Grand Prix in English)	Ippolito Berrone	Maserati 4CM	-	DNF
1934	August 13	Targa Abruzzi	Scuderia Ferrari	Alfa Romeo 8C 2300 Monza	Guglielmo Carraroli	DNF
1934	October 14	III Circuito di Modena	Ippolito Berrone	Alfa Romeo 8C 2300 Monza	none	DNS
1935	July 7	I Gran Premio del Valentino	Scuderia Subalpina	Maserati 4CM	Giuseppe Farina; Pietro Ghersi; Eugenio Siena; Piero Dusio; Felice Bonetto; Gino Rovere	DNS
1935	July 20	VII Grand Prix de Dieppe	Ippolito Berrone	Maserati 4CM	none	5th
1935	August 15	XI Coppa Acerbo Junior	Ippolito Berrone	Maserati 4CM	none	DNS
1935	September 15	IV Circuito di Modena Junior	Ippolito Berrone	Maserati 4CM	none	1st
1937	December 12	Litoranea Libica	-	Lancia Aprilia	Angelo Poggio	4th
1939	March 26	Litoraneo Libica	-	Lancia Aprilia	"Leoncini"	1st
1950	-	Pontedecimo-Giovi Hillclimb	-	O.S.C.A.	-	-
