= 1936 Tripoli Grand Prix =

Race details
- Date: 10 May 1936
- Official name: X° GRAN PREMIO DI TRIPOLI
- Location: Mellaha, Italy
- Course: Permanent racing facility
- Course length: 13.140 km (8.164 miles)
- Distance: 40 laps, 525.60 km (326.592 miles)

Pole position
Driver	(Germany) Bernd Rosemeyer	Auto Union
- Time: 3:28.0

Fastest lap
Driver	(Italy) Achille Varzi	Auto Union
- Time: 3:27.4

Podium
First	(Italy) Achille Varzi	Auto Union
Second	(Germany) Hans Stuck	Auto Union
Third	(Italy) Luigi Fagioli	Mercedes Benz

The 1936 Tripoli Grand Prix was a Grand Prix motor race held on 10 May 1936. This race was part of the 1936 Grand Prix Season as a non-championship race. The race was won by Achille Varzi in an Auto Union Type C.

Tazio Nuvolari was originally unable to participate in the race after crashing in practice, but he raced anyway. His car blew a tire and crashed into a column trackside. Nuvolari was ejected from the car and suffered injuries.

== Results ==
=== Race ===
Pos	No	Driver	Constructor	Laps	Time/Retired
1	10	(Italy) Achille Varzi	Auto Union	40	2'31:25.4
2	32	(Germany) Hans Stuck	Auto Union	40	+4.4
3	24	(Italy) Luigi Fagioli	Mercedes Benz	40	+2:13.0
4	18	(Germany) Rudolf Caracciola	Mercedes Benz	40	+3:31.0
5	36	(Italy) Carlo Pintacuda	Alfa Romeo	39	+1 Lap
6	16	(Italy) Mario Tadini	Alfa Romeo	39	+1 Lap
7	48	(Italy) Antonio Brivio	Alfa Romeo	39	+1 Lap
8	20	(Italy) Tazio Nuvolari	Alfa Romeo	39	+1 Lap
9	30	(Monaco) Louis Chiron	Mercedes Benz	37	+3 Laps
10	40	(Italy) Giovanni Battaglia	Alfa Romeo	32	+8 Laps
Ret	60	(Italy) Franco Cortese	Alfa Romeo	32	Engine
11	12	(Italy) Constantin Magistri	Alfa Romeo	27	+13 Laps
Ret	34	(France) Philippe Étancelin	Maserati	13	Oil Leak
Ret	46	(Germany) Bernd Rosemeyer	Auto Union	18	Fire
Ret	26	(Germany) Manfred von Brauchitsch	Mercedes Benz	16	Fuel feed
Ret	22	(Switzerland) Hans Rüesch	Maserati	13	-
Ret	56	(France) Raymond Sommer	Alfa Romeo	13	-
Ret	58	(Italy) Archimede Rosa	Alfa Romeo	6	-
Ret	52	(Italy) Ferdinando Barbieri	Maserati	5	-
Ret	54	(Italy) Francesco Severi	Alfa Romeo	4	-
Ret	8	(Italy) Luigi Soffietti	Maserati	4	-
Ret	44	(Italy) Pietro Ghersi	Maserati	3	-
Ret	4	(Italy) Eugenio Siena	Maserati	1	-
Ret	28	(Italy) Renato Balestrero	Alfa Romeo	1	-
Ret	42	(Italy) Guglielmo Carraroli	Maserati	1	-
Ret	14	(Italy) Piero Taruffi	Maserati	0	-
