= Jan Rens =

Dutch racig driver and pilot (1896–1942)

- Born: Johannes Willem Rens; 29 June 1896 Batavia, Dutch East Indies
- Died: 9 April 1942 (aged 45) Gross-Rosen concentration camp, Germany

Johannes Willem Rens (29 June 1896 – 9 April 1942), also known as Jan Rens or J. Walter Rens, was a Dutch racing driver and pilot.

== Life ==
Rens was a member of the family which owned the F.J. Fuchs concern in the Dutch East Indies, whose activities included a car dealership. In 1935, after his second marriage ended when he and his French wife shot each other, he returned to the Netherlands, and rented a Bugatti Type 43, although he reneged on a deal to buy the car; his mother did buy him a Bugatti Type 51 in May 1936.

In April 1940, he sought to enlist in the Swedish Air Force, but was turned down. The next year, he was arrested by the occupying Nazi forces after he drunkenly waved a revolver at one of his neighbours, and sent to the Gross-Rosen concentration camp in Poland, where he died in April 1942.

== Racing career ==
Rens used the 51 to take part in two Grandes Epreuves, the 1936 German Grand Prix and 1936 Eifelrennen, retiring from the first and not starting the second after a practice crash.
