= Gino Rovere =

Italian racing driver

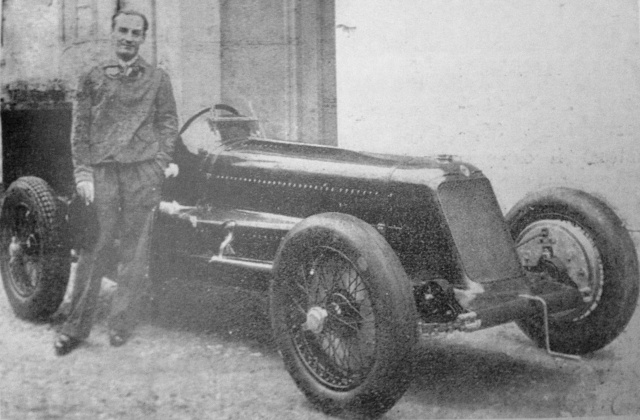
Gino and Maserati 6C 34 in 1936

Gino Rovere (24 September 1897 – 12 January 1965) was an Italian racing driver. He competed in 20 races between 1934 and 1938 in Alfa Romeo's, Maserati's and Bugatti's. In 1936, he invested in Officine Alfieri Maserati, at the same time assigning his protégé Giuseppe Farina as chairman.

== Complete results ==
Year	Date	Race	Entrant	Car	Teammate	Result
1934	April 8	Mille Miglia	-	Alfa Romeo 8C	Giovanni Alloatti	DNS
1934	April 22	Circuito di Pietro Bordino (Heat 1)	Gino Rovere	Alfa Romeo 8C	none	7th
1934	August 13	Targa Abruzzi	Scuderia Subalpina	Alfa Romeo 8C	Piero Dusio	-
1934	September 2	I Circuito di Biella (Heat 3)	Scuderia Subalpina	Alfa Romeo 8C	Giuseppe Farina	3rd
1935	June 9	II Circuito di Biella (Heat 2)	Scuderia Subalpina	Maserati 4CM	Achille Varzi; Pietro Ghersi; Eugenio Siena; Giuseppe Farina; Piero Dusio	DNF
1935	June 9	II Circuito di Biella (Voiturette)	Gino Rovere	Maserati	-	3rd
1935		Swiss Grand Prix	Gino Rovere	Maserati 6C-34	Giuseppe Farina	8th
1935	July 7	I Gran Premio del Valentino/I Circuito di Torino (Heat 3)	Scuderia Subalpina	Maserati 4CM	Giuseppe Farina; Pietro Ghersi; Ippolito Berrone; Eugenio Siena; Piero Dusio; Felice Bonetto	4th
1935	September 21	500 Miles of Brooklands	Scuderia Subalpina	Maserati 6C-34	none	DNS
1935	September 15	IV Circuito di Modena Junior	Gino Rovere	Maserati 4CM	none	DNF
1935	October 5	I Donington Grand Prix	Scuderia Subalpina	Maserati 6C-34	Bill Everitt; Giuseppe Farina	4th
1936	June 21	XII Grand Prix de Picardie	Officine Alfieri Maserati	Maserati	"G. Balocci"; Carlo Felice Trossi	DNS
1936	June 28	I Circuito di Milano	Officine Alfieri Maserati	Maserati	Carlo Felice Trossi; Omobono Tenni	5th
1936	August 2	X Coppa Ciano	Officine Alfieri Maserati	Maserati 4CM	Carlo Felice Trossi	5th
1936	August 15	XII Coppa Acerbo	Officine Alfieri Maserati	Maserati 4CM	Carlo Felice Trossi	6th
1937	April 18	II Gran Premio del Valentino/II Circuito di Torino	Officine Alfieri Maserati	Maserati 6CM	Ettore Bianco; René Dreyfus	4th
1937	May 30	I Circuito della Superba	-	Maserati	-	DNS
1937	June 13	Gran Premio di Firenze	Officine Alfieri Maserati	Maserati 6CM	Carlo Felice Trossi; René Dreyfus; Ettore Bianco; Giovanni Rocco	2nd
1937	June 20	II Circuito di Milano	Officine Alfieri Maserati	Maserati 6CM	none	DNF
1937	July 25	Circuito di Ospedaletti (Heat 3)	Officine Alfieri Maserati	Maserati 6CM	Giovanni Rocco; Ettore Bianco; Achille Varzi	DNF
1938	April 3	Mille Miglia	-	Bugatti	Robert Brunet	DNS
