= Pugno =

Pugno is an Italian surname. Notable people with the surname include:

- Raoul Pugno, (1852 – 1914 [O.S. 1913]), French composer, teacher, organist, and pianist known for his playing of Mozart's works
- Nicola Pugno (born 1972), Italian scientist, mechanical engineer, astrophysicist

== See also ==
- Puno (disambiguation)
