= Rudolf Heydel =

German racing driver

Karl Rudolf Heydel (born 1911 in Leipzig; died 4 February 1936 in Monza), Italy, was a German racing driver.

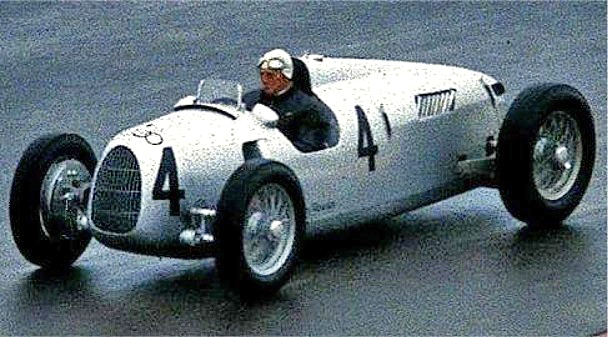
Auto Union Typ C similar to the car of the crash

== Career ==
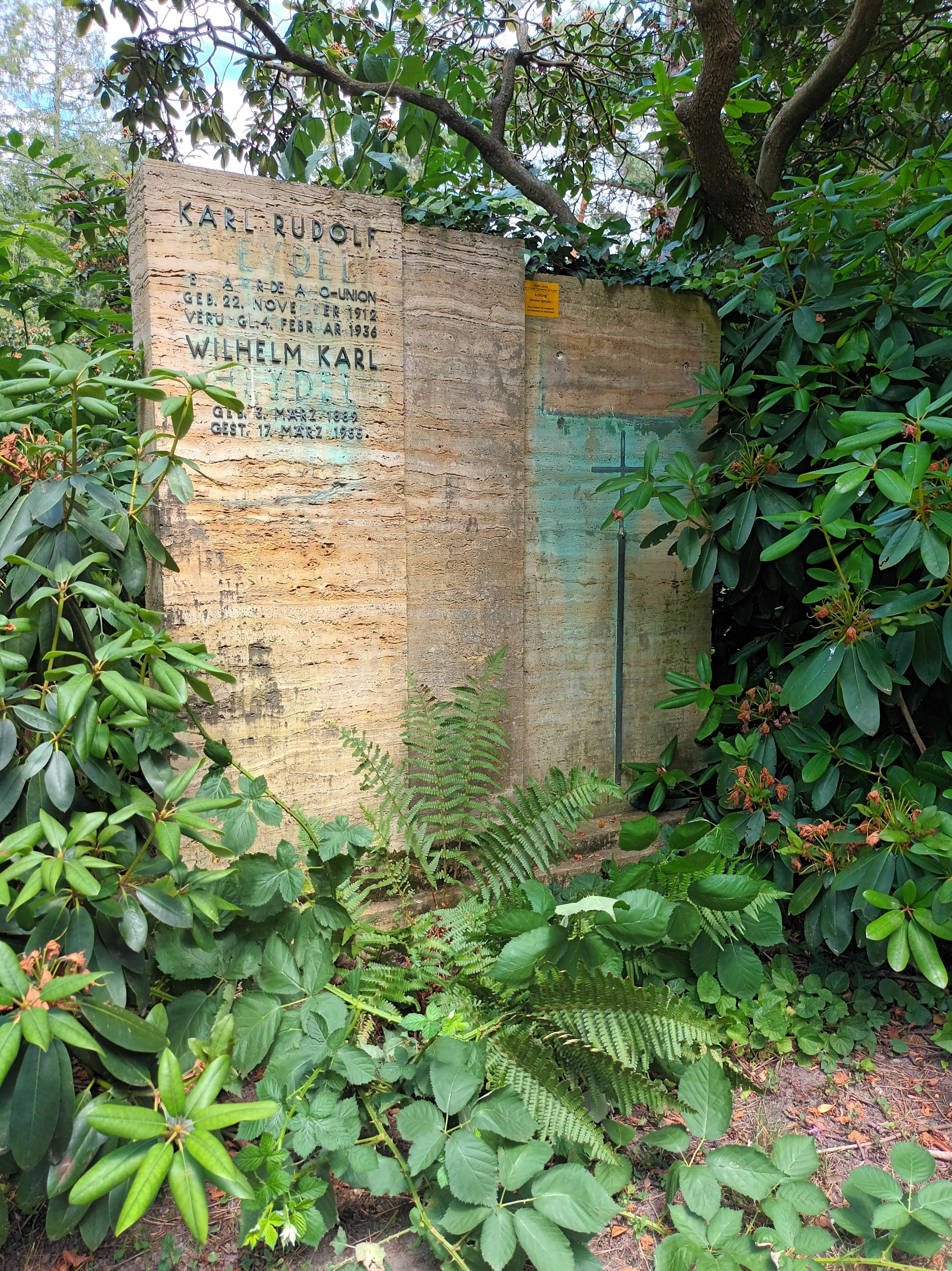
Grave site

Heydel worked as a test driver in the research department of the Zwickau-Horch- works. He was a protégé of Auto Union-Works team driver Hans Stuck. In November 1935, the Auto Union racing department with race director Karl Feuereissen tested some drivers on the Nordschleife of the Nürburgring. Heydel, Ernst von Delius and Rudolf Hasse were selected to drive for Auto Union in the 1936 European Championship alongside the established drivers Bernd Rosemeyer and Hans Stuck.

In February 1936, the three new drivers had to carry out tests on the nearly seven-kilometer high-speed circuit at the Italian Autodromo Nazionale Monza. On the morning of 4 February Heydel started his first test in the Auto Union Type C racing car. On his third lap, the inexperienced driver lost control in the Curva del Vialone, situated at the start of what is today the Variante Ascari, and crashed into the barriers. The impact caused a fuel leak, which ignited immediately setting the vehicle ablaze. Heydel was killed on the spot, from a head injury as the car rolled.

== Literature ==
- Reuß, Eberhard (2006), Hitlers Rennschlachten: Die Silberpfeile unterm Hakenkreuz (in German) (1 ed.), Berlin: Aufbau-Verlag, ISBN 978-3-351-02625-7
