= 1936 German Grand Prix =

- Race 2 of 4 in the 1936 European Championship

Race details
- Date: 26 July 1936
- Official name: IX Großer Preis von Deutschland
- Location: Nürburgring; Nürburg, Germany
- Course: Permanent racing facility
- Course length: 22.810 km (14.173 miles)
- Distance: 22 laps, 501.82 km (311.82 miles)
- Weather: Cool, windy

Pole position
Driver	(France) Jean-Pierre Wimille	Bugatti
- Grid positions set by ballot

Fastest lap
Driver	(Germany) Bernd Rosemeyer	Auto Union
- Time: 9:56.3

Podium
First	(Germany) Bernd Rosemeyer	Auto Union
Second	(Germany) Hans Stuck	Auto Union
Third	(Italy) Antonio Brivio	Alfa Romeo

The 1936 German Grand Prix was a Grand Prix motor race held at the Nürburgring on 26 July 1936.

== Classification ==
Pos	No	Driver	Team	Car	Laps	Time/Retired	Grid	Points
1	4	(Germany) Bernd Rosemeyer	Auto Union	Auto Union C	22	3:48:39.5	6	1
2	2	(Germany) Hans Stuck	Auto Union	Auto Union C	22	+3:56.7	2	2
3	24	(Italy) Antonio Brivio	Scuderia Ferrari	Alfa Romeo 12C-36	22	+8:25.5	11	3
4	8	(Germany) Rudolf Hasse	Auto Union	Auto Union C	22	+10:33.6	17	4
5	16	(Italy) Luigi Fagioli	Daimler-Benz AG	Mercedes-Benz W25K	21	+1 Lap	13	4
5	16	(Germany) Rudolf Caracciola	Daimler-Benz AG	Mercedes-Benz W25K	21	+1 Lap	13	n/a
6	6	(Germany) Ernst von Delius	Auto Union	Auto Union C	21	+1 Lap	16	4
7	14	(Germany) Manfred von Brauchitsch	Daimler-Benz AG	Mercedes-Benz W25K	21	+1 Lap	4	4
7	14	(Germany) Hermann Lang	Daimler-Benz AG	Mercedes-Benz W25K	21	+1 Lap	4	n/a
8	32	(Italy) Carlo Felice Trossi	Scuderia Torino	Maserati 4C	21	+1 Lap	7	4
8	32	(United Kingdom) Richard Seaman	Scuderia Torino	Maserati 4C	21	+1 Lap	7	n/a
9	40	(France) Raymond Sommer	Private entry	Alfa Romeo Tipo B	19	+3 Laps	19	4
10	10	(New Zealand) Thomas Pitt Cholmondeley-Tapper	Private entry	Maserati 8CM	18	+4 Laps	18	4
DNF	20	(Germany) Hermann Lang	Daimler-Benz AG	Mercedes-Benz W25K	12	Supercharger	9	4
DNF	20	(Germany) Rudolf Caracciola	Daimler-Benz AG	Mercedes-Benz W25K	12	Supercharger	9	n/a
DNF	26	(Italy) Francesco Severi	Scuderia Ferrari	Alfa Romeo Tipo C	17	Oil pump	15	4
DNF	26	(France) René Dreyfus	Scuderia Ferrari	Alfa Romeo Tipo C	17	Oil pump	15	n/a
DNF	22	(Italy) Tazio Nuvolari	Scuderia Ferrari	Alfa Romeo 12C-36	13	Rear axle	3	5
DNF	18	(Monaco) Louis Chiron	Daimler-Benz AG	Mercedes-Benz W25K	11	Accident	14	5
DNF	28	(France) René Dreyfus	Scuderia Ferrari	Alfa Romeo 12C-36	7	Ignition	8	6
DNF	34	(Netherlands) Jan Rens	Private entry	Bugatti T51	7	Oil pipe	12	6
DNF	12	(Germany) Rudolf Caracciola	Daimler-Benz AG	Mercedes-Benz W25K	3	Fuel pump	5	7
DNF	30	(United Kingdom) Richard Seaman	Scuderia Torino	Maserati V8RI	2	Brake problem	10	7
DNF	36	(France) Jean-Pierre Wimille	Bugatti	Bugatti T59	2	Gearbox	1	7
DNF	38	(Chile) Juan Zanelli	Scuderia Villapadierna	Maserati 8CM	0	Fuel feed	20	7

Grand Prix Race
Previous race: 1936 Monaco Grand Prix	1936 Grand Prix season Grandes Épreuves	Next race: 1936 Swiss Grand Prix
Previous race: 1935 German Grand Prix	German Grand Prix	Next race: 1937 German Grand Prix
