= 1936 Monaco Grand Prix =

Coordinates: 43°44′4.74″N 7°25′16.8″E

- Race 1 of 4 in the 1936 European Championship
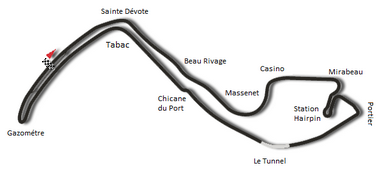

Race details
- Date: 13 April 1936
- Official name: VIII Grand Prix de Monaco
- Location: Circuit de Monaco; Monte Carlo
- Course: Street circuit
- Course length: 3.180 km (1.976 miles)
- Distance: 100 laps, 318.0 km (197.6 miles)
- Weather: Heavy rain

Pole position
Driver	(Monaco) Louis Chiron	Mercedes-Benz
- Time: 1:53.2

Fastest lap
Driver	(Germany) Hans Stuck	Auto Union
- Time: 2:07.4

Podium
First	(Germany) Rudolf Caracciola	Mercedes-Benz
Second	(Italy) Achille Varzi	Auto Union
Third	(Germany) Hans Stuck	Auto Union

The 1936 Monaco Grand Prix was a Grand Prix motor race held at Circuit de Monaco on 13 April 1936. It was the eighth running of the Monaco Grand Prix.

Monegasque Louis Chiron qualified on pole position for the race, which was affected by heavy rain. A broken oil line on the Alfa Romeo of Mario Tadini on the opening lap led to multiple incidents in the chicane after the tunnel; the Mercedes-Benzes of Chiron, Luigi Fagioli, and Manfred von Brauchitsch, as well as Giuseppe Farina's Alfa Romeo and Bernd Rosemeyer's Typ C of newcomer Auto Union, were all eliminated there. Tazio Nuvolari in the Alfa Romeo 8C benefitted from the chaos, only to suffer brake fade, and Rudolf Caracciola, proving the truth of his nickname, Regenmeister (Rainmaster), went on to win for Mercedes. He was followed by Achille Varzi and Hans Stuck, both for Auto Union.

== Classification ==
Pos	No	Driver	Team	Car	Laps	Time/Retired	Grid	Points
1	8	(Germany) Rudolf Caracciola	Daimler-Benz AG	Mercedes-Benz W25K	100	3:49:20.4	3	1
2	4	(Italy) Achille Varzi	Auto Union	Auto Union C	100	+1:48.9	7	2
3	2	(Germany) Hans Stuck	Auto Union	Auto Union C	99	+1 Lap	4	3
4	24	(Italy) Tazio Nuvolari	Scuderia Ferrari	Alfa Romeo 8C 35 Type C	99	+1 Lap	2	4
5	26	(Italy) Antonio Brivio	Scuderia Ferrari	Alfa Romeo 8C 35 Type C	97	+3 Laps	11	4
5	26	(Italy) Giuseppe Farina	Scuderia Ferrari	Alfa Romeo 8C 35 Type C	97	+3 Laps	11	n/a
6	16	(France) Jean-Pierre Wimille	Bugatti	Bugatti T59	97	+3 Laps	8	4
7	22	(France) Raymond Sommer	Private entry	Alfa Romeo Tipo B	94	+6 Laps	14	4
8	38	(Italy) Pietro Ghersi	Scuderia Torino	Maserati 6C-34	87	+13 Laps	17	4
9	18	(United Kingdom) William Grover-Williams	Bugatti	Bugatti T59	84	+16 Laps	16	4
DNF	20	(France) Philippe Étancelin	Private entry	Maserati V8RI	37	Split tank	15	6
DNF	32	(Italy) Carlo Felice Trossi	Scuderia Torino	Maserati V8RI	29	Timing pinion	12	6
DNF	6	(Germany) Bernd Rosemeyer	Auto Union	Auto Union C	12	Accident	5	7
DNF	12	(Italy) Luigi Fagioli	Daimler-Benz AG	Mercedes-Benz W25K	8	Accident	10	7
DNF	36	(Italy) Eugenio Siena	Scuderia Torino	Maserati 6C-34	1	Accident	18	7
DNF	10	(Monaco) Louis Chiron	Daimler-Benz AG	Mercedes-Benz W25K	1	Accident	1	7
DNF	14	(Germany) Manfred von Brauchitsch	Daimler-Benz AG	Mercedes-Benz W25K	1	Accident	9	7
DNF	30	(Italy) Giuseppe Farina	Scuderia Ferrari	Alfa Romeo 8C 35 Type C	1	Accident	6	7
DNF	28	(Italy) Mario Tadini	Scuderia Ferrari	Alfa Romeo 8C 35 Type C	1	Oil leak	13	7
DNS	3	(Germany) Ernst von Delius	Auto Union	Auto Union C		Practice accident		8

Grand Prix Race
Previous race: 1935 Spanish Grand Prix	1936 Grand Prix season Grandes Épreuves	Next race: 1936 German Grand Prix
Previous race: 1935 Monaco Grand Prix	Monaco Grand Prix	Next race: 1937 Monaco Grand Prix
