= Thomas Cholmondeley-Tapper =

New Zealand racing driver (1910–2001)

- Born: Thomas Pitt Cholmondeley-Tapper; 31 July 1910 Christchurch, New Zealand
- Died: 27 July 2001 (aged 90) Headington, Oxford, England

Thomas Pitt Cholmondeley-Tapper (31 July 1910 – 27 July 2001) was an auto racing driver from New Zealand.

== Early life ==
Tapper was born in Christchurch. At the age of 13, he bought and restored a non-working Douglas motorcycle. His family moved to England when he was 14. He was accepted as an undergraduate at Jesus College, Cambridge, but took a double-gap year before starting his studies, in which time he studied at the University of Grenoble, and became an expert skier, to the extent that he claimed he was offered a place on the British Olympic team in 1936.

== Racing career ==
While at Cambridge, he was taken by his undergraduate colleagues to Brooklands, and developed a love for motor sport. In 1932 he struck up a friendship with Eileen Ellison, who often entered cars for him. In 1935, with Ellison and her brother, he toured a number of European circuits, taking part in voiturette events in a Bugatti Type 37A.

In 1936, Tapper bought an old GP Maserati 8CM from Earl Howe, and a Ferrari Monza. With the Maserati being respectable enough to appear at Grand Epreuves, Cholmondeley-Tapper entered the 1936 German Grand Prix, in which he finished 10th. He also took part in the 1936 Donington Grand Prix, retiring with a steering problem. At the end of the year, Auto Union invited Cholmondeley-Tapper to take part in a test, but he eschewed it for skiing.

== Later life ==
Turned down for the Royal Air Force at the outbreak of the Second World War, he joined the Air Transport Auxiliary, where he met Margaret, who became his wife. He also owned an airfield at Haddenham which was used by Spitfires in the war.

== Works ==
- Cholmondeley-Tapper, Thomas Pitt, Amateur Racing Driver , G. T. Foulis & Co, 1953
