= Jardim América =

- Neighborhood
- Location in Rio de Janeiro Jardim América (Brazil)
- Coordinates: 22°48′38″S 43°19′24″W
- Country: Brazil
- State: Rio de Janeiro (RJ)
- Municipality/City: Rio de Janeiro
- Zone: North Zone

Jardim América is a neighborhood in the North Zone of Rio de Janeiro, Brazil.
