= Puno (disambiguation) =

Puno is an Andean city in Peru.

Puno or PUNO may also refer to:

== Places ==
- Puno District, a district in the Puno Province
- Puno Province, a province in the Puno Region in Peru
- Puno Region, a region in Peru

== People ==
- Carlito Puno, Philippine technocrat
- Práxedes Fajardo y Puno, Philippine revolutionary
- Reynato Puno, Philippine judge
- Ricardo Concepción Puno, Philippine jurist
- Ricardo Villanueva Puno, Philippine journalist
- Rico E. Puno, Philippine technocrat
- Rico J. Puno, Philippine singer
- Roberto Puno, Philippine politician
- Ronaldo Puno, Philippine politician

== Institutions ==
- Polish University Abroad (Polish: Polski Uniwersytet na Obczyźnie)

== Others ==
- Puño Airlines, a fake airline used to entrap fugitives
