= Bill Everitt (racing driver) =

English racing driver (1901–1993)

William Gordon Everitt (7 October 1901 in Bromsgrove, Worcestershire – 3 August 1993 in Old Alresford, Hampshire) was an English racing driver.

== Racing career ==
He started racing after being touted as the "next Dick Seaman". Eventually, Everitt entered a number of races between 1933 and 1938 in mainly MGs. At the Brooklands August bank holiday meeting in 1934, he won the 750cc race in a MG Q-type, at over 100mph, having previously claimed the world class record for the flying kilometre and flying mile in the same car. In 1936 he bought E.R.A. R6B from Dudley Benjafield, but sold it after one troubled race.

He took part in one Grand Prix, the 1935 Donington Grand Prix, driving a 3.7 litre Maserati 6CM34 - reputedly ex-Tazio Nuvolari - entered by Scuderia Subalpina for its Maidenhead-based sponsor Gino Rovere. Despite Rovere putting up the money, Everitt started the race, and ran in 2nd place late in the race, until increasing brake problems and vibrations forced Everitt into the pits to hand over the wheel. He took part in a number of races in South Africa in 1938, including the 1938 South African Grand Prix, with a best result of 3rd in Earl Howe's Maserati at the 1938 Grosvenor Grand Prix, but these were handicap races rather than Grandes Epreuves.

He was the founder of the Road Racing Club, the organization behind the Crystal Palace Circuit, which held its first race in 1937. Everitt himself was able to race there, a highlight being 6th in the 1938 Coronation Trophy, driving the MG K3 owned by Reg Parnell, who was under a suspension.

== World War 2 ==
Everitt had been a naval officer until 1924 - serving in the First World War when still a teenager - and signed up for the Senior Service once more when the Second World War started. He was given command of an anti-submarine boat in 1940, and in 1924 was twice mentioned in despatches. After the war he bought his gunboat for recreational and educational purposes.

== Incomplete results ==
Year	Date	Race	Circuit	Entrant	Car	Teammate(s)	Result
1933	19 August	National Donington (S850)	Donington Park	-	MG Q-type	-	1st
1933	19 August	National Donington (S1.5)	Donington Park	-	MG Q-type	-	3rd
1934	1 September	RAC Tourist Trophy	Ards Circuit	Tazio Nuvolari	MG Magnette NE Type	none	DNF
1934	22 September	BRDC 500 Miles	Brooklands	Capt. G.E.T. Eyston	MG Magnette K3	Thomas Wisdom	4th
1935	21 September	BRDC 500 Miles	Brooklands	A.T. Goldie Gardner	MG Magnette K3	A.T. Goldie Gardner	8
1935	5 October	I Donington GP	Donington Park	Scuderia Subalpina	Maserati 6C-34	Giuseppe Farina; Gino Rovere	4th
1936	28 May	IV RAC International Light Car Race	Snaefell Mountain Course	-	ERA B	-	NC
1938	23 April	Cork International Light Car Race	Carrigrohane	William Everitt	MG Magnette K3	none	DNS
