= Carlo Maria Pintacuda =

Italian racing driver (1900–1971)

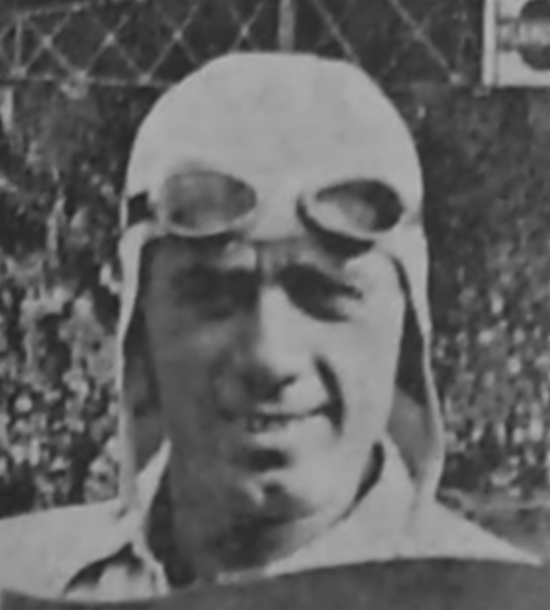
Carlo Maria Pintacuda

Carlo Maria Pintacuda (18 September 1900 – 8 March 1971) was a motor-racing driver from Italy.

Pintacuda was born in Florence on 18 September 1900. He was one of the greatest drivers from the "Florentine School" alongside Emilio Materassi, Gastone Brilli-Peri, Clemente Biondetti and Giulio Masetti, and won two editions of Mille Miglia races, in 1935 and 1937. After retiring from racing he lived in Argentina where he opened a grocery store.

He died in Buenos Aires on 8 March 1971.
