= Ernst von Delius =

German racing driver (1912–1937)

- Born: Ernst Ludwig Ferdinand von Delius; 29 March 1912 Plessa, Brandenburg, Prussia, German Empire
- Died: 26 July 1937 (aged 25) Nürburg, Rheinprovinz, Prussia, German Reich

European Championship career
- Years active: 1936–1937
- Teams: Auto Union
- Starts: 3
- Wins: 0
- Podiums: 0
- Poles: 0
- Fastest laps: 0
- Best finish: 7th in 1936

Champ Car career
- 1 race run over 1 year
- Best finish: 10th (1937)
- First race: 1937 Vanderbilt Cup (Westbury)
Wins	Podiums	Poles
0	0	0

Ernst Ludwig Ferdinand von Delius (29 March 1912 – 26 July 1937) was a German racing driver.

von Delius died at the age of 25 years at the Nürburgring Circuit during the 1937 German Grand Prix, having suffered a fatal collision with Richard Seaman.

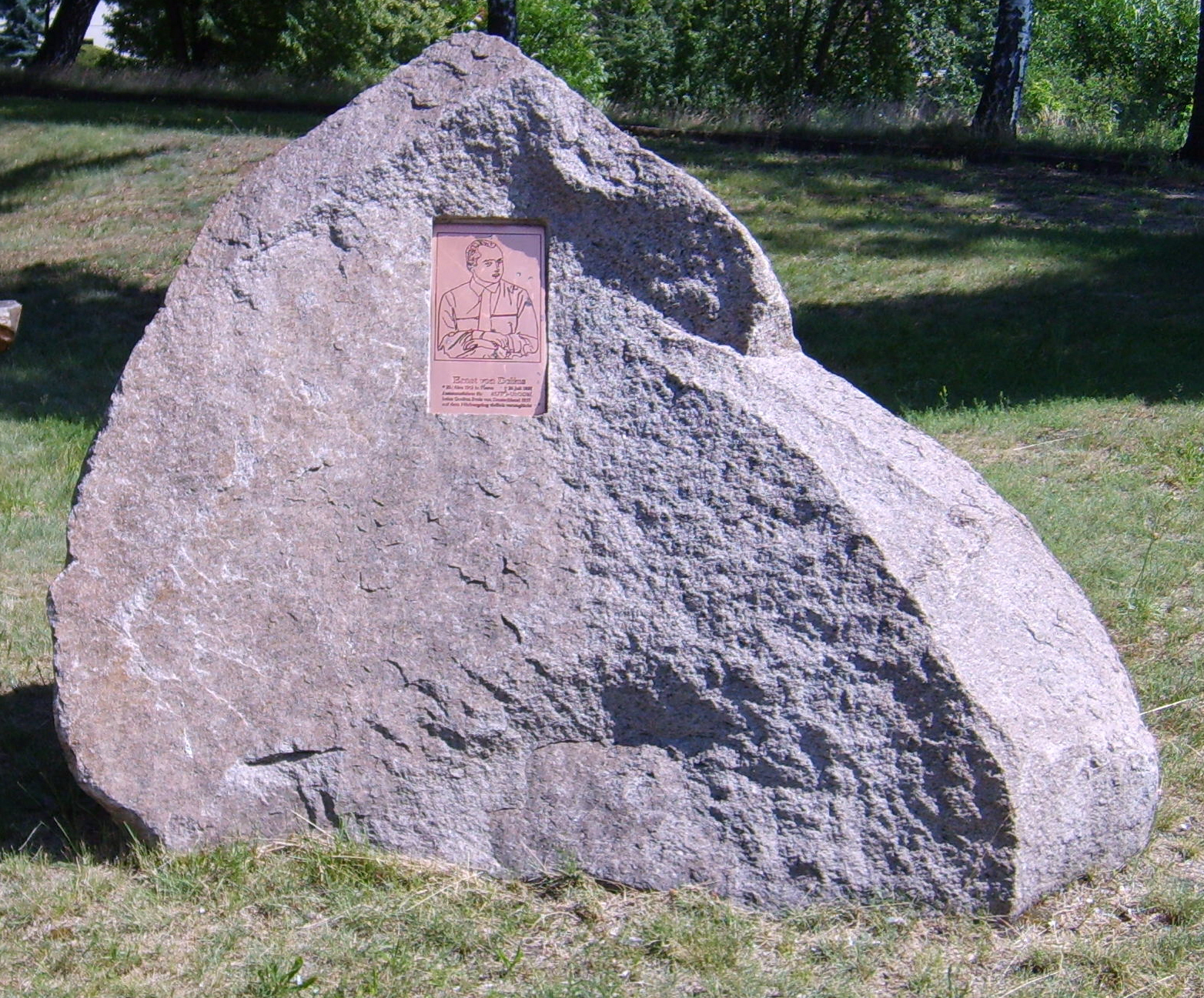
Memorial to von Delius in his birthplace of Plessa
