= 1934 Swiss Grand Prix =

Race details
- Date: 26 August 1934
- Official name: I Großer Preis der Schweiz
- Location: Bern
- Course: Circuit Bremgarten
- Course length: 7.28 km (4.52 miles)
- Distance: 70 laps, 509.6 km (316.4 miles)

Pole position
Driver	(Germany) Hans Stuck	Auto Union

Fastest lap
Driver	(Germany) August Momberger	Auto Union
- Time: 2:53.0

Podium
First	(Germany) Hans Stuck	Auto Union
Second	(Germany) August Momberger	Auto Union
Third	(France) René Dreyfus	Bugatti

The 1934 Swiss Grand Prix was a Grand Prix motor race run to the 750 kg formula, held over 70 laps of Circuit Bremgarten, near Bern, on 26 August 1934. It was supported earlier in the day by the voiturette-class Prix de Berne, held over 15 laps of the same circuit. The main event was won by Hans Stuck in an Auto Union, who led the race from the start. While Stuck's pole position had been earned by setting the fastest lap time in practice, starting positions following the German were decided by ballot. The voiturette race was won by Dick Seaman driving an MG, having started from the ninth row of the grid. The meeting was marred by the fatal accident of British driver Hugh Hamilton on the final lap of the Grand Prix.

== Classification ==
=== Großer Preis der Schweiz ===
Pos.	No.	Driver	Car	Laps	Time/Retired	Grid
1	6	(Germany) Hans Stuck	Auto Union A	70	3:37:51.6	1
2	4	(Germany) August Momberger	Auto Union A	69	+ 1 lap	16
3	14	(France) René Dreyfus	Bugatti T59	69	+ 1 lap	14
4	32	(Italy) Achille Varzi (Italy) Carlo Felice Trossi	Alfa Romeo P3	69	+ 1 lap	2
5	28	(Monaco) Louis Chiron	Alfa Romeo P3	69	+ 1 lap	5
6	12	(Italy) Luigi Fagioli	Mercedes-Benz W25	68	+ 2 laps	15
7	30	(Italy) Pietro Ghersi	Alfa Romeo P3	66	+ 4 laps	10
8	26	(Italy) Clemente Biondetti	Maserati 4C 2500	66	+ 4 laps	3
Ret	40	(United Kingdom) Hugh Hamilton	Maserati 8CM	65	fatal accident	12
NC	16	(United Kingdom) Earl Howe	Maserati 8CM	63	+ 7 laps	17
NC	10	(Germany) Rudolf Caracciola (Germany) Hanns Geier	Mercedes-Benz W25	62	+ 8 laps	9
Ret	8	(Germany) Manfred von Brauchitsch	Mercedes-Benz W25	52	oil pipe	11
Ret	24	(Italy) Renato Balestrero	Alfa Romeo 8C 2600	47	gearbox	8
Ret	20	(Italy) Tazio Nuvolari	Maserati 8CM	36	engine	7
Ret	2	(Germany) Hermann of Leiningen	Auto Union A	18	gearbox	13
Ret	38	(Hungary) László Hartmann	Bugatti T35B	13	mechanical	6
DNS	36	(Switzerland) Hans Ruesch	Maserati 8CM			4

Grand Prix Race
1934 Grand Prix season
Previous race: None	Swiss Grand Prix	Next race: 1935 Swiss Grand Prix
