= Swiss Grand Prix =

Swiss auto race

- Dijion-Prenois Circuit (1976 onwards layout used for the 1982 Swiss Grand Prix)

Race information
- Number of times held: 16
- First held: 1934
- Last held: 1982
- Most wins (drivers): (Germany) (Germany) Rudolf Caracciola (3)
- Most wins (constructors): (Germany) (Germany) Mercedes (5)
- Circuit length: 3.800 km (2.361 miles)
- Race length: 304.000 km (188.897 miles)
- Laps: 80

Last race (1982)

Pole position
- (France) Alain Prost; Renault; 1:01.380

Podium
- 1. (Finland) K. Rosberg; Williams-Ford; 1:32:41.087; 2. (France) A. Prost; Renault; +4.442; 3. (Austria) N. Lauda; McLaren-Ford; +1:00.343

Fastest lap
- (France) Alain Prost; Renault; 1:07.477

The Swiss Grand Prix (French: Grand Prix de Suisse, German: Großer Preis der Schweiz, Italian: Gran Premio di Svizzera) was the premier auto race of Switzerland. The first edition was held in 1934, and it was held every year until 1939. The event returned in 1947 and was held every year until 1954. The event had been scheduled to take place in 1955, before a ban on motorsport in Switzerland was put in place. Every edition from 1934 to 1954 was held at the Circuit Bremgarten. The event returned in 1975 and 1982, but was held at the Dijon-Prenois circuit in France.

== History ==
=== Bremgarten (1934–1939, 1947–1954) ===
Grand Prix motor racing came to Switzerland in 1934, to the Bremgarten circuit, located just outside the town of Bremgarten, near the Swiss de facto capital of Bern. The Bremgarten circuit was the dominant circuit on the Swiss racing scene; it was a fast 7.27-kilometre (4.52 mi) stretch made up of public roads that went through stunning countryside and forests, sweeping from corner to corner without any real length of straight. From the outset, Bremgarten's tree-lined roads, often poor light conditions, and changes in road surface made for what was acknowledged to be a very dangerous circuit, especially in the wet- even after it stopped raining and the sun came out, the trees covering the circuit were still soaking wet, and water would drip onto the tarmac for at least an hour. Conditions at this circuit were similar to that of the Nürburgring in West Germany- and this circuit was as highly popular with drivers as the Nürburgring was.

The first Swiss Grand Prix was a non-championship race; it was won by Hans Stuck in an Auto Union; British driver Hugh Hamilton died in a horrific accident in his Maserati. The car's left front wheel broke at the very fast Wohlenstrasse corner, and Hamilton then lost control and then the whole car violently hit a tree, and continued going for about 70 feet before it hit and was stopped by a bigger tree, shattering the car and killing Hamilton (who had not been thrown from the car) instantly. Despite this occurrence (there was hardly any, if any, thought put into safety in those days), the Swiss Grand Prix counted toward the European Championship from 1935 to 1939, during which time it was dominated by the German Silver Arrows.

Grand Prix racing returned after World War II, and the Bremgarten track remained the home of the Swiss Grand Prix. The first post-war race was won by Frenchman Jean-Pierre Wimille, and in 1948 it was designated the European Grand Prix, in a time when this title was an honorary designation given each year to one Grand Prix race in Europe. This event, which was perhaps the blackest and most tragic Grand Prix of the 1940s saw multiple fatalities and serious injuries from massive accidents all around the circuit throughout the weekend. Veteran Italian racer and pre-WWII legend Achille Varzi would die during a rain-soaked practice session in an Alfa Romeo- helmets were not compulsory in those days, and Varzi, whose Alfa had overturned during the accident, was crushed by the 700kg Alfetta, which was more than 10 times his weight (Varzi was not wearing a helmet, and cars did not have roll-over protection in those days). The race also saw Swiss Christian Kautz die in a Maserati after going off the road and crashing into an embankment at the second Eymatt corner; the race was won by Carlo Felice Trossi. Frenchman Maurice Trintignant was nearly killed in another accident after crashing and being thrown out of his car and landing unconscious on the track. Three drivers including Nino Farina went off and crashed while trying to avoid the motionless Frenchman, who survived after multiple serious injuries and spending 8 days in a coma.

1950 saw the Swiss Grand Prix being inducted as part of the new Formula One World Championship (although at the time, all the races were run in Europe except the Indianapolis 500, but this race was not run to F1 regulations). This race was won by Italian Nino Farina, who would go on to be the first Formula One world champion. 1951 saw Argentine Juan Manuel Fangio dominate in his Alfa after taking advantage of Farina's wrong decision not to make a pit stop to change tyres during changing wet-to-dry conditions. 1952 saw Briton up-and-comer Stirling Moss run as high as third in his underfunded Alta-powered HWM, and Italian Piero Taruffi scored his first and only F1 victory; it was also the only championship race (other than the Indianapolis 500) not won that year by his Ferrari teammate and countryman Alberto Ascari. Pre-war great and three-time Swiss GP winner Rudolf Caracciola was competing in a support sportscar race and crashed into a tree, and the violent accident that ensued ended up breaking one of his legs, which effectively ended his long racing career. 1953 saw Ascari battling back after a pit stop to fix the misfiring engine in his Ferrari; he came back out in fourth and stormed round the circuit, passed Fangio in a Maserati, his teammates Farina and Mike Hawthorn to take victory. Ascari also won his second Drivers' Championship at that event. 1954 saw Fangio (now driving a Mercedes) lead from start to finish in rainy weather and he took his second Drivers' Championship from countryman José Froilán González.

In 1955, however, the Swiss Grand Prix at Bremgarten was to be no more. After the Le Mans disaster in France that year which killed more than 80 people, the Swiss government declared circuit motor racing to be an unsafe sport and it was promptly banned; this forced the organizers to cancel the Grand Prix that year. Bremgarten was ultimately abandoned and was never used again for motor racing.

=== Dijon-Prenois, France (1975, 1982) ===
The Swiss Grand Prix returned in 1975 as a non-Championship Grand Prix just across the border, at the Dijon-Prenois circuit, France. Swiss Clay Regazzoni won the race. The Swiss Grand Prix only ran once more, when it returned to the Formula One World Championship in 1982. The 1982 race, also held at Dijon, was organized by the Swiss Auto Club and was the first F1 win by Finland's Keke Rosberg, driving for Williams, in what proved to be his Championship-winning season. Rosberg displayed a spirited drive in which he passed several cars, and was held up for some time by backmarker Andrea de Cesaris, then caught and passed polesitter Alain Prost. Although both the 1975 and 1982 races were held on French soil, the Dijon circuit was near the French-Swiss border, with both races organized by the Swiss Automobile Club.

=== Legislation ===
On 6 June 2007, the National Council voted to lift the ban of circuit racing in Switzerland, 97 in favor and 77 opposed. However, the legislation was subsequently not ratified by the Council of States. In 2015 the Swiss government allowed a relaxation of the law, permitting head-to-head racing events to be held in Switzerland for electric vehicles only. As a result, on 10 June 2018, Switzerland hosted its first motor race in 64 years when the first Zürich ePrix was held as a round of the all-electric Formula E championship. In 2026, the ban was lifted entirely.

== Winners ==
=== By year ===
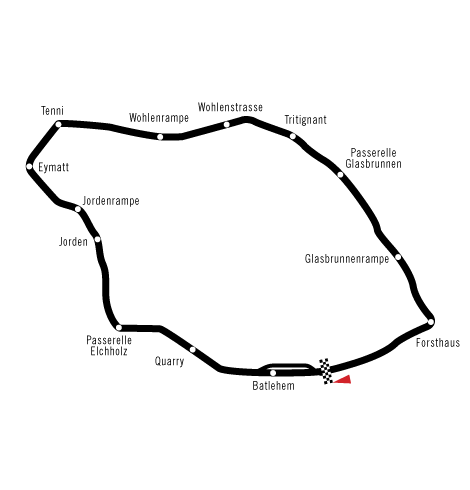
Circuit Bremgarten, used in 1934–1939 and 1947–1954

A pink background indicates an event which was not part of the Formula One World Championship.
A yellow background indicates an event which was part of the pre-war European Championship.

Year	Driver	Constructor	Location	Report
1934	(Germany) Hans Stuck	Auto Union	Bremgarten	Report
1935	(Germany) Rudolf Caracciola	Mercedes-Benz	Bremgarten	Report
1936	(Germany) Bernd Rosemeyer	Auto Union	Bremgarten	Report
1937	(Germany) Rudolf Caracciola	Mercedes-Benz	Bremgarten	Report
1938	(Germany) Rudolf Caracciola	Mercedes-Benz	Bremgarten	Report
1939	(Germany) Hermann Lang	Mercedes-Benz	Bremgarten	Report
1940 – 1946	Not held			
1947	(France) Jean-Pierre Wimille	Alfa Romeo	Bremgarten	Report
1948	(Italy) Carlo Felice Trossi	Alfa Romeo	Bremgarten	Report
1949	(Italy) Alberto Ascari	Ferrari	Bremgarten	Report
1950	(Italy) Nino Farina	Alfa Romeo	Bremgarten	Report
1951	(Argentina) Juan Manuel Fangio	Alfa Romeo	Bremgarten	Report
1952	(Italy) Piero Taruffi	Ferrari	Bremgarten	Report
1953	(Italy) Alberto Ascari	Ferrari	Bremgarten	Report
1954	(Argentina) Juan Manuel Fangio	Mercedes	Bremgarten	Report
1955 – 1974	Not held			
1975	(Switzerland) Clay Regazzoni	Ferrari	Dijon (France)	Report
1976 – 1981	Not held			
1982	(Finland) Keke Rosberg	Williams-Ford	Dijon (France)	Report

=== Repeat winners (drivers) ===
A pink background indicates an event which was not part of the Formula One World Championship.
A yellow background indicates an event which was part of the pre-war European Championship.

Wins	Driver	Years won
3	(Germany) Rudolf Caracciola	1935, 1937, 1938
2	(Italy) Alberto Ascari	1949, 1953
2	(Argentina) Juan Manuel Fangio	1951, 1954

=== Repeat winners (constructors) ===
A pink background indicates an event which was not part of the Formula One World Championship.
A yellow background indicates an event which was part of the pre-war European Championship.

Constructors in bold are competing in the Formula One championship in 2026.

Wins	Constructor	Years won
5	**(Germany) / (Germany) Mercedes**	1935, 1937, 1938, 1939, 1954
4	(Italy) Alfa Romeo	1947, 1948, 1950, 1951
4	**(Italy) Ferrari**	1949, 1952, 1953, 1975
2	(Germany) Auto Union	1934, 1936

=== Repeat winners (engine manufacturers) ===
A pink background indicates an event which was not part of the Formula One World Championship.
A yellow background indicates an event which was part of the pre-war European Championship.

Manufacturers in bold are competing in the Formula One championship in 2026.

Wins	Manufacturer	Years won
5	**(Germany) / (Germany) Mercedes**	1935, 1937, 1938, 1939, 1954
4	(Italy) Alfa Romeo	1947, 1948, 1950, 1951
4	**(Italy) Ferrari**	1949, 1952, 1953, 1975
2	(Germany) Auto Union	1934, 1936
