= Hanns Geier =

German racing driver (1902–86)

- Born: Hanns Geier; 25 February 1902 Waldalgesheim, Germany
- Died: 1986

Hanns Geier was a German Grand Prix racing driver active before the Second World War.

== Career ==
Geier started racing in 1920, originally on motorcycles, before switching to four wheels; first with an Amilcar, and later with Bugattis, run in partnership with August Momberger.

In 1932, Mercedes-Benz recruited him as a test driver, and in 1934 he received a late call-up to take part in the German Grand Prix, as Manfred von Brauchitsch had broken his arm. Geier acquainted himself with the Nurburgring driving the Alfa Romeo P2 which Mercedes-Benz had bought from Rudolf Caracciola, and in the race drove conservatively to finish 5th. He was reserve driver at the Swiss and Czechoslovakian Grands Prix that year, and had drives in both races, taking over Caracciola's car in the first after it was suffering from brake problems and "Caratsch" was switched into a faster car, and taking over Ernst Henne's in the second, Henne feeling unwell.

Geier drove the enclosed cockpit record-breaking Mercedes-Benz at the 1935 Eifelrennen, retiring after a carburettor broke, Geier noting that the main risk was that the cockpit cover could only be opened from the outside. He finished 7th at the 1935 German Grand Prix but in practice for the Swiss he suffered a hideous accident, after taking too wide a line between the grandstand and the pits, demolishing a row of timing boxes; Geier was thrown out of the car and found underneath a parked car. Geier was unconscious for eight days, but survived, although he never raced again. Alfred Neubauer kept Geier in a job by appointing him as his race assistant.

== Complete European Championship results ==
Year	Entrant	Chassis	Engine	1	2	3	4	5	6	7	EDC	Pts	Ref
1935	Mercedes-Benz	M	Eng	MON	FRA	BEL	GER; 7	SUI; DNS	ITA	ESP	24th=	52	
