= 1938 Swiss Grand Prix =

- Race 3 of 4 in the 1938 European Championship

Race details
- Date: 21 August 1938
- Official name: V Großer Preis der Schweiz
- Location: Bremgarten; Bern, Switzerland
- Course: Road course
- Course length: 7.28 km (4.52 miles)
- Distance: 50 laps, 364.00 km (226.18 miles)
- Weather: Heavy rain

Pole position
Driver	(United Kingdom) Richard Seaman	Mercedes-Benz
- Time: 2:38.8

Fastest lap
Driver	(United Kingdom) Richard Seaman	Mercedes-Benz
- Time: 2:51.0

Podium
First	(Germany) Rudolf Caracciola	Mercedes-Benz
Second	(United Kingdom) Richard Seaman	Mercedes-Benz
Third	(Germany) Manfred von Brauchitsch	Mercedes-Benz

The 1938 Swiss Grand Prix was a Grand Prix motor race held at Bremgarten, Switzerland on 21 August 1938.

== Classification ==
Pos	No	Driver	Team	Car	Laps	Time/Retired	Grid	Points
1	12	(Germany) Rudolf Caracciola	Daimler-Benz AG	Mercedes-Benz W154	50	2:32:07.8	3	1
2	16	(United Kingdom) Richard Seaman	Daimler-Benz AG	Mercedes-Benz W154	50	+26.0	1	2
3	10	(Germany) Manfred von Brauchitsch	Daimler-Benz AG	Mercedes-Benz W154	49	+1 Lap	5	3
4	8	(Germany) Hans Stuck	Auto Union	Auto Union D	48	+2 Laps	4	4
5	38	(Italy) Giuseppe Farina	Alfa Corse	Alfa Romeo Tipo 312	48	+2 Laps	10	4
6	28	(Italy) Piero Taruffi	Scuderia Torino	Alfa Romeo Tipo 308	47	+3 Laps	11	4
7	40	(France) Jean-Pierre Wimille	Alfa Corse	Alfa Romeo Tipo 312	47	+3 Laps	8	4
DNF	4	(Germany) Hermann Paul Müller	Auto Union	Auto Union D	46	Accident	6	4
8	18	(France) René Dreyfus	Ecurie Bleue	Delahaye 145	46	+4 Laps	12	4
9	6	(Italy) Tazio Nuvolari	Auto Union	Auto Union D	46	+4 Laps	7	4
10	14	(Germany) Hermann Lang	Daimler-Benz AG	Mercedes-Benz W154	45	+4 Laps	2	4
10	14	(Germany) Walter Bäumer	Daimler-Benz AG	Mercedes-Benz W154	45	+4 Laps	2	n/a
11	20	(France) "Raph"	Ecurie Bleue	Delahaye 145	43	+7 Laps	15	4
12	24	(Italy) Emilio Romano	Private entry	Alfa Romeo Monza	41	+9 Laps	16	4
13	32	(Switzerland) Max Christen	Private entry	Maserati 8CM	40	+10 Laps	17	4
14	26	(Italy) Edoardo Teagno	Squadra Subauda	Maserati 8CM	39	+11 Laps	13	4
14	26	(Thailand) Prince Bira	Squadra Subauda	Maserati 8CM	39	+11 Laps	13	n/a
DNF	2	(Switzerland) Christian Kautz	Auto Union	Auto Union D	19	Fuel leak	9	6
DNF	30	(Switzerland) Adolfo Mandirola	Auto-Agence S.A.	Maserati 8CM	17		18	6
DNF	22	(Italy) Giovanni Minozzi	Private entry	Alfa Romeo Monza	17		19	6
DNF	34	(Hungary) István de Sztriha	Private entry	Alfa Romeo Monza	5		20	7
DNS	36	(Switzerland) Toulo de Graffenried	Ecurie Du Puy de Graffenried	Maserati 6C-34			14	8

Grand Prix Race
Previous race: 1938 German Grand Prix	1938 Grand Prix season Grandes Épreuves	Next race: 1938 Italian Grand Prix
Previous race: 1937 Swiss Grand Prix	Swiss Grand Prix	Next race: 1939 Swiss Grand Prix
