= 1935 Swiss Grand Prix =

- Race 5 of 7 in the 1935 European Championship

Race details
- Date: 25 August 1935
- Official name: II Großer Preis der Schweiz
- Location: Bremgarten; Bern, Switzerland
- Course: Road course
- Course length: 7.28 km (4.52 miles)
- Distance: 70 laps, 509.60 km (316.65 miles)
- Weather: Heavy rain

Pole position
Driver	(Italy) Achille Varzi	Auto Union
- Time: 2:41.8

Fastest lap
Driver	(Germany) Rudolf Caracciola	Mercedes-Benz
- Time: 2:44.4

Podium
First	(Germany) Rudolf Caracciola	Mercedes-Benz
Second	(Italy) Luigi Fagioli	Mercedes-Benz
Third	(Germany) Bernd Rosemeyer	Auto Union

The 1935 Swiss Grand Prix was a Grand Prix motor race held at Bremgarten on 25 August 1935.

== Classification ==
Pos	No	Driver	Team	Car	Laps	Time/Retired	Grid	Points
1	10	(Germany) Rudolf Caracciola	Daimler-Benz AG	Mercedes-Benz W25	70	3:31:12.2	2	1
2	12	(Italy) Luigi Fagioli	Daimler-Benz AG	Mercedes-Benz W25	70	+35.9	4	2
3	2	(Germany) Bernd Rosemeyer	Auto Union	Auto Union B	70	+1:07.8	5	3
4	6	(Italy) Achille Varzi	Auto Union	Auto Union B	69	+1 Lap	1	4
5	32	(Italy) Tazio Nuvolari	Scuderia Ferrari	Alfa Romeo Tipo B	68	+2 Laps	7	4
6	42	(Germany) Hermann Lang	Daimler-Benz AG	Mercedes-Benz W25	67	+3 Laps	6	4
7	30	(France) René Dreyfus	Scuderia Ferrari	Alfa Romeo Tipo B	66	+4 Laps	8	4
8	22	(Italy) Giuseppe Farina	Gino Rovere	Maserati 6C-34	64	+6 Laps	11	4
9	16	(France) Raymond Sommer	Private entry	Alfa Romeo Tipo B	63	+7 Laps	16	4
10	18	(United Kingdom) Earl Howe	Earl Howe	Bugatti T59	60	+10 Laps	12	4
11	4	(Germany) Hans Stuck	Auto Union	Auto Union B	57	+13 Laps	3	4
11	4	(Germany) Paul Pietsch	Auto Union	Auto Union B	57	+13 Laps	3	n/a
12	26	(Italy) Renato Balestrero	Gruppo San Giorgio	Maserati 26M	53	+17 Laps	17	4
Ret	40	(Hungary) László Hartmann	Private entry	Maserati 8CM	24	Accident	14	6
Ret	24	(Italy) Ferdinando Barbieri	Franco Sardi	Alfa Romeo Tipo B	15	Spark plugs	18	7
Ret	8	(Germany) Manfred von Brauchitsch	Daimler-Benz AG	Mercedes-Benz W25	14	Engine	9	7
Ret	28	(Monaco) Louis Chiron	Scuderia Ferrari	Alfa Romeo Tipo B	7	Accident	10	7
Ret	20	(United Kingdom) Brian Lewis	Earl Howe	Maserati 8CM	3	Mechanical	15	7
Ret	34	(France) Philippe Étancelin	Scuderia Subalpina	Maserati 6C-34	0	Accident	13	7
DNS		(Germany) Hanns Geier	Daimler-Benz AG	Mercedes-Benz W25		Practice accident		8

== Notes ==
- Hanns Geier crashed in practice, ending his driving career.
- Paul Pietsch took over Hans Stuck's car after it developed a mechanical problem.

Grand Prix Race
Previous race: 1935 German Grand Prix	1935 Grand Prix season Grandes Épreuves	Next race: 1935 Italian Grand Prix
Previous race: 1934 Swiss Grand Prix	Swiss Grand Prix	Next race: 1936 Swiss Grand Prix
