= 1936 Swiss Grand Prix =

- Race 3 of 4 in the 1936 European Championship

Race details
- Date: 23 August 1936
- Official name: III Großer Preis der Schweiz
- Location: Bremgarten; Bern, Switzerland
- Course: Road course
- Course length: 7.28 km (4.52 miles)
- Distance: 70 laps, 509.60 km (316.65 miles)

Pole position
Driver	(Germany) Rudolf Caracciola	Mercedes-Benz
- Time: 2:37.9

Fastest lap
Driver	(Germany) Bernd Rosemeyer	Auto Union
- Time: 2:34.5

Podium
First	(Germany) Bernd Rosemeyer	Auto Union
Second	(Italy) Achille Varzi	Auto Union
Third	(Germany) Hans Stuck	Auto Union

The 1936 Swiss Grand Prix was a Grand Prix motor race held at Bremgarten on 23 August 1936.

== Classification ==
Pos	No	Driver	Team	Car	Laps	Time/Retired	Grid	Points
1	4	(Germany) Bernd Rosemeyer	Auto Union	Auto Union C	70	3:09:01.6	2	1
2	8	(Italy) Achille Varzi	Auto Union	Auto Union C	70	+52.6	3	2
3	6	(Germany) Hans Stuck	Auto Union	Auto Union C	69	+1 Lap	9	3
4	16	(Germany) Hermann Lang	Daimler-Benz AG	Mercedes-Benz W25	69	+1 Lap	5	4
4	16	(Italy) Luigi Fagioli	Daimler-Benz AG	Mercedes-Benz W25	69	+1 Lap	5	n/a
5	2	(Germany) Rudolf Hasse	Auto Union	Auto Union C	67	+3 Laps	10	4
5	2	(Germany) Ernst von Delius	Auto Union	Auto Union C	67	+3 Laps	10	n/a
DNF	20	(France) Raymond Sommer	Private entry	Alfa Romeo Tipo B	51	Transmission	14	5
DNF	10	(Germany) Manfred von Brauchitsch	Daimler-Benz AG	Mercedes-Benz W25	50	Overheating	4	5
DNF	18	(France) Philippe Étancelin	Private entry	Maserati V8RI	34	Throttle linkage	15	6
DNF	12	(Germany) Rudolf Caracciola	Daimler-Benz AG	Mercedes-Benz W25	29	Rear axle	1	6
DNF	28	(France) René Dreyfus	Scuderia Ferrari	Alfa Romeo 12C-36	26	Magneto	7	6
DNF	24	(United Kingdom) Earl Howe	Private entry	Bugatti T59	24	Accident	16	6
DNF	32	(Italy) Tazio Nuvolari	Scuderia Ferrari	Alfa Romeo 12C-36	18	Magneto	6	6
DNF	36	(Italy) Clemente Biondetti	Scuderia Maremmana	Maserati 6C-34	10	Transmission	13	7
DNF	14	(Italy) Luigi Fagioli	Daimler-Benz AG	Mercedes-Benz W25	6	Oil pipe	8	7
DNF	30	(Italy) Giuseppe Farina	Scuderia Ferrari	Alfa Romeo 8C 35	6	Engine	12	7
DNF	22	(France) Jean-Pierre Wimille	Bugatti	Bugatti T59/50B	3	Gearbox	11	7
DNF	38	(Switzerland) Jacques de Rham	Scuderia Maremmana	Maserati 8CM	1		17	7

Grand Prix Race
Previous race: 1936 German Grand Prix	1936 Grand Prix season Grandes Épreuves	Next race: 1936 Italian Grand Prix
Previous race: 1935 Swiss Grand Prix	Swiss Grand Prix	Next race: 1937 Swiss Grand Prix
