= Regenmeister =

Several racing drivers of German origin, have been nicknamed the Regenmeister (rain master) for their prowess in wet conditions:

- Rudolf Caracciola (1901–1959)
- Hans-Joachim Stuck (born 1951)
- Michael Schumacher (born 1969)
