= Fafnir (automobile) =

German maker of vehicles and engines, 1894-1926

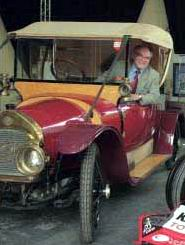

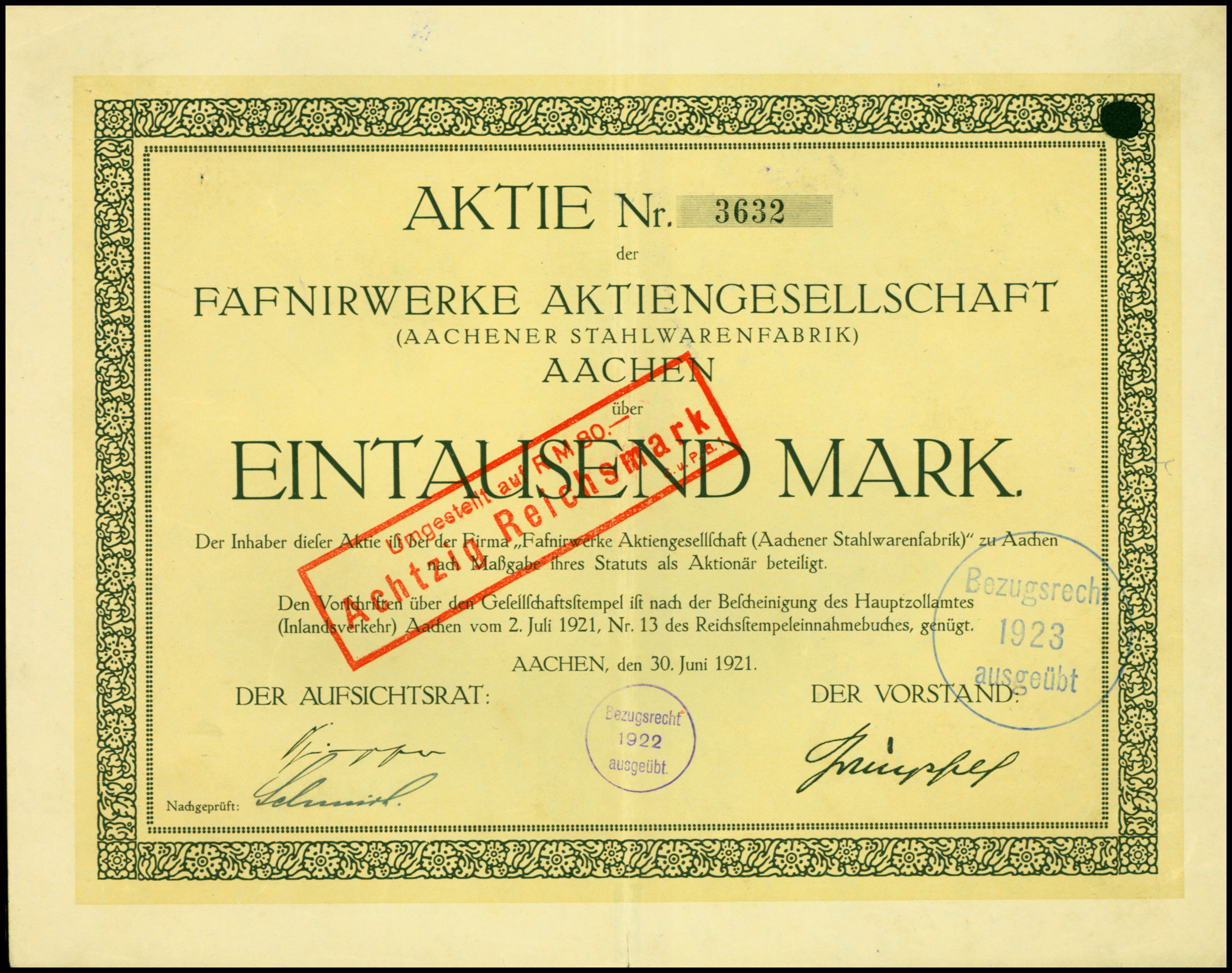
Share of the Fafnirwerke AG, issued 1921

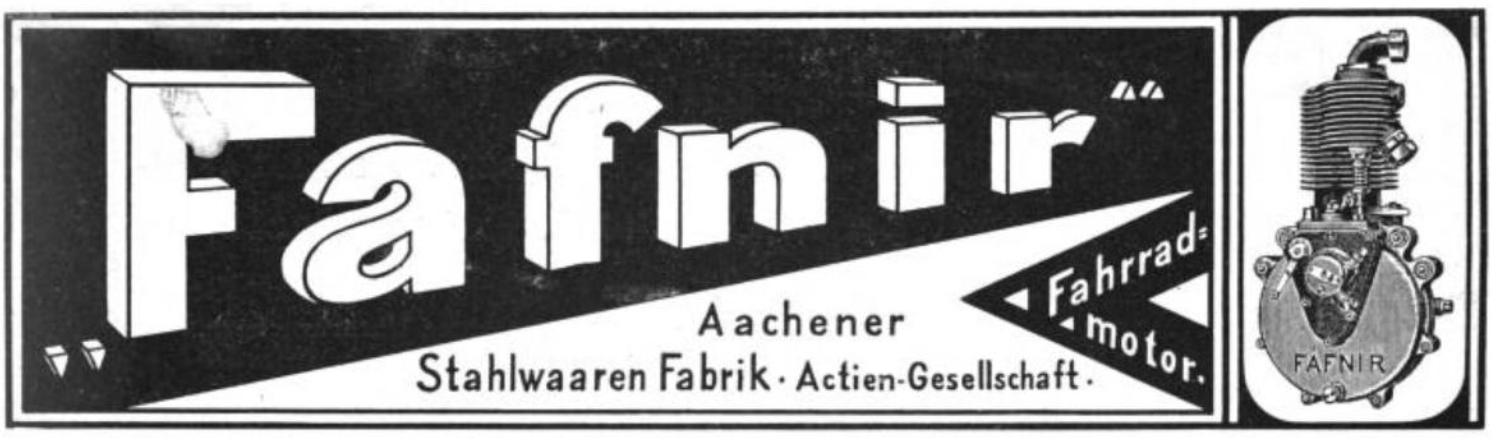
Fafnir advertisement (1904)

Fafnir was a German engine and vehicle manufacturer based in Aachen (Prussia). They made a range of cars between 1908 and 1926.

The company was founded in 1894 producing needles. With the growth of the bicycle industry, they started to make wheel spokes. In 1898, the company was registered as "Carl Schwanemeyer, Aachener Stahlwarenfabrik AG".

From 1902 the name "Fafnir" started to be used on the company's products, including a range of motorcycle engines.

== Omnimobil and early car production ==
In 1904, the company started to produce kits, consisting of an engine and associated components, to allow others, particularly bicycle makers, to enter into motor vehicle production. These were sold under the name "Omnimobil". The kit at first was based around a two-cylinder engine rated at 6 Horsepower(HP) with later a larger option with a four-cylinder, 16 HP unit.

Beginning in 1908, finished cars were manufactured with the type "274" with a 1520 cubic centimetre(cc) engine and a maximum speed of 60 km/h (37 mph) and the type "284" with 2012cc capable of 70 km/h (43 mph). The engines had overhead inlet and side exhaust valves.

By 1912 six different models were available at prices between 4,100 and 16,000 German Reichsmark(RM).

== Early motorcycle production ==
From 1900, the company produced motorcycle engines in various capacities up to 8h.p. V-twins. From 1903 until 1914 they also produced complete motorcycles.

The 1914 engine production included the following:

- 2.5 hp (70mm bore, 80mm stroke) single with ball bearing crankshaft
- 3.5 hp (85mm bore, 88mm stroke) single with ball bearing crankshaft
- 4.5 hp (86mm bore, 96mm stroke) single
- 5-6 hp (70mm bore, 80mm stroke) twin
- Cycle Car engine (85mm bore, 88mm stroke) twin with either air or water cooling

== Post World War I cars ==
In 1919, the company changed its name to Aachener Stahlwarenfabrik Fafnir-AG. The pre war 1924 cc Typ 472 and 2496 cc Typ 384 were re-introduced and a new Typ 471 with 1950 cc engine announced which could be bought with a supercharger.

The Typ "471" proved to be the last car model made and survived in production until 1927.

== Motor sport ==
Fafnir had its own racing team running up to seven cars with drivers including Rudolf Caracciola. A replica of one of the racing cars has been built in the United Kingdom and competed in number of VSCC events fitted with a WW1 Hall-Scott aero engine.

== Closure ==
Fafnir production methods were very labour-intensive, and with the difficult trading conditions of the 1920s failed to compete with the large manufacturers. Prices were reduced, but losses mounted and with debts of 1.8 million RM the banks forced the company into bankruptcy in 1925 with a resulting closure in 1926.

== Fafnir cars ==
Type	years	cylinders	capacity	power output	top speed
Typ 274	1908-?	4 in-line		14 PS (10,3 kW)	60 km/h (37 mph)
Typ 284 (8/16 PS)	1909-1912	4 in-line	2012 cc	16 PS (11,8 kW)	70 km/h (43 mph)
Typ 384 (10/25 PS)	1910-1914	4 in-line	2496 cc	25 PS (18,4 kW)	75 km/h (47 mph)
Typ 486 (6/16 PS)	1913-1920	4 in-line	1559 cc	16 PS (11,8 kW)	60 km/h (37 mph)
Typ 394 (14/35 PS)	1914	4 in-line	3990 cc	35 PS (25,8 kW)	85 km/h (53 mph)
Typ 471 (9/30 PS / 9/36 PS)	1920-1927	4 in-line	2250 cc	30-36 PS (22-27 kW)	
8/50 PS Sport	1923-1927	4 in-line	2000 cc	50 PS (37 kW)	

== See also ==
- Aachener
