= 1935 German Grand Prix =

- Race 4 of 7 in the 1935 European Championship

Race details
- Date: 28 July 1935
- Official name: VIII Großer Preis von Deutschland
- Location: Nürburgring; Nürburg, Germany
- Course: Permanent racing facility
- Course length: 22.810 km (14.17 miles)
- Distance: 22 laps, 501.82 km (311.82 miles)
- Weather: Wet, overcast

Pole position
Driver	(Germany) Hans Stuck	Auto Union
- Grid positions set by ballot

Fastest lap
Driver	(Germany) Manfred von Brauchitsch	Mercedes-Benz
- Time: 10:32.0

Podium
First	(Italy) Tazio Nuvolari	Alfa Romeo
Second	(Germany) Hans Stuck	Auto Union
Third	(Germany) Rudolf Caracciola	Mercedes-Benz

The 1935 German Grand Prix was a Grand Prix motor race held at the Nürburgring on 28 July 1935. The underdog victory of Tazio Nuvolari in an Alfa Romeo P3 against far more powerful German cars that had dominated the season to this point is widely considered one of the greatest events in the history of motor racing. The crowd of 300,000 applauded Nuvolari, while the representatives of the Third Reich were frustrated and enraged.

In 1935, Nuvolari scored his most impressive victory, thought by many to be the greatest victory in car racing of all times, when at the German Grand Prix at the Nürburgring, driving an old Alfa Romeo P3 (3167 cc, 8C, compressor, 265 hp) versus the dominant all conquering home team's cars of five Mercedes-Benz W25 (3990 cm^{3}, 8C, compressor, 375 hp (280 kW)), driven by the Germans Rudolf Caracciola, Luigi Fagioli, Hermann Lang, Manfred von Brauchitsch, and Hanns Geier and four Auto Union Type B (4950 cc, 16C, compressor, 375 hp (280 kW)), driven by Bernd Rosemeyer, Achille Varzi, Hans Stuck, and Paul Pietsch. As a result, this victory is known as "The Impossible Victory".

== Race ==
The 1935 event was considered to be one of the all-time greatest motorsport victories and remembered as Nuvolari's greatest race. In a monumental drive, the Italian beat nine superior German Silver Arrows with an inferior red Alfa Romeo. The 1935 German Grand Prix at Nürbugring was held under chilling and dreadful conditions. An estimated 300,000 German fans including some of the most powerful and high ranking Third Reich officers showed up for the race that was run over the course of 22.8 km consisting of 174 turns.

There were high expectations that one of the German drivers would win the race since they had the most powerful and advanced cars. Three Alfa-Romeos were presented by the Scuderia Ferrari team and were driven by Italian drivers Antonio Brivio and Nuvolari, along with Monegasque driver Louis Chiron. The rest of the competitors were from Maserati, English Racing Automobiles (ERA), and Bugatti and were contested under private teams. Nuvolari's Alfa Romeo P3 Tipo B enjoyed the maximum engine capacity used in these cars, 3.2 litre, 290 bhp. The race position was determined by a ballot. Nuvolari secured the front row in his second place but due to a poor start dropped down to the third place with teammates Brivio retiring at lap 1 and Chiron at lap 5, leaving Tazio with the only Alfa Romeo left competing in the race.

Nuvolari drove a very hard race in appalling conditions. After a dreadful start, he was able to pass a number of cars, particularly while some of the German cars pitted. By lap 10, Nuvolari was already leading the race while the rest of the cars were struggling to maintain a grip on the now rain-soaked track. After a botched pit stop in which he lost a total of 2 minutes and 14 seconds due to refueling delays from a broken pressure pump, he joined the race in sixth place. He drove on the limit, made up the time and was second by the start of the last lap, albeit 35 seconds behind the leader von Brauchitsch in a Mercedes who had ruined his tyres by pushing very hard to get the win in the dreadful conditions.

Nuvolari was able to catch the German, passing him when one of von Brauchitsch's tyres blew out, and took the chequered flag to win the race in front of the stunned German High Command and 300,000 spectators. The 42-year-old Nuvolari ended up finishing in front of eight running Silver Arrows; Stuck finished 2 minutes behind Nuvolari, and von Brauchitsch was nearly inconsolable. It was due to the pace of Nuvolari that the German had to drive so aggressively that ultimately proved to be his downfall. The Nazi officials were also confounded by the lack of a recording of the Italian anthem to play over the loudspeakers, as only Deutschland Uber Alles (Germany's anthem) had been ready for what they thought was a mere formality and inevitabile German triumph. This was ultimately solved by Nuvolari himself, who always had a copy of the Marcia Reale.

== Classification ==
Pos	No	Driver	Team	Car	Laps	Time/Retired	Grid	Points
1	12	(Italy) Tazio Nuvolari	Scuderia Ferrari	Alfa Romeo Tipo B	22	4:08:04.1	2	1
2	1	(Germany) Hans Stuck	Auto Union	Auto Union B	22	+2:14.3	1	2
3	5	(Germany) Rudolf Caracciola	Daimler-Benz AG	Mercedes-Benz W25B	22	+3:09.0	7	3
4	3	(Germany) Bernd Rosemeyer	Auto Union	Auto Union B	22	+4:46.9	12	4
5	7	(Germany) Manfred von Brauchitsch	Daimler-Benz AG	Mercedes-Benz W25B	22	+6:13.3	5	4
6	6	(Italy) Luigi Fagioli	Daimler-Benz AG	Mercedes-Benz W25B	22	+7:54.2	13	4
7	8	(Germany) Hanns Geier	Daimler-Benz AG	Mercedes-Benz W25A	21	+1 Lap	19	4
8	2	(Italy) Achille Varzi	Auto Union	Auto Union B	21	+1 Lap	11	4
9	4	(Germany) Paul Pietsch	Auto Union	Auto Union B	20	+2 Laps	15	4
10	21	(Switzerland) Hans Ruesch	Private entry	Maserati 8CM	20	+2 Laps	9	4
11	16	(Italy) Goffredo Zehender	Scuderia Subalpina	Maserati 6C-34	19	+3 Laps	4	4
12	22	(Italy) Pietro Ghersi	Luigi Soffietti	Maserati 8CM	19	+3 Laps	16	4
Ret	17	(France) Philippe Étancelin	Scuderia Subalpina	Maserati 6C-34	18	Engine	6	4
Ret	9	(Germany) Hermann Lang	Daimler-Benz AG	Mercedes-Benz W25A	15	Engine	17	5
Ret	10	(United Kingdom) Raymond Mays	ERA	ERA B	11	Oil pressure	10	5
Ret	10	(Germany) Ernst von Delius	ERA	ERA B	11	Oil pressure	10	n/a
Ret	20	(Hungary) László Hartmann	Private entry	Maserati 8CM	9	Ignition	14	6
Ret	14	(Monaco) Louis Chiron	Scuderia Ferrari	Alfa Romeo Tipo B	5	Differential	8	7
Ret	23	(Italy) Piero Taruffi	Bugatti	Bugatti T59	3	Accident	18	7
Ret	15	(Italy) Antonio Brivio	Scuderia Ferrari	Alfa Romeo Tipo B	1	Differential	20	7
Ret	11	(Italy) Renato Balestrero	Gruppo San Giorgio	Alfa Romeo Tipo B	0	Accident	3	7
DNS	15	(France) René Dreyfus	Scuderia Ferrari	Alfa Romeo Tipo B				8
DNS	19	(Germany) Ernst von Delius	ERA	ERA B		Practice accident		8
DNS	22	(Italy) Luigi Soffietti	Luigi Soffietti	Maserati 8CM				8

=== Starting grid positions ===
1st Row	3 Pos.		2 Pos.		1 Pos.
	(Italy); Balestrero; Alfa Romeo		(Italy); Nuvolari; Alfa Romeo		(Germany); Stuck; Auto Union
2nd Row		2 Pos.		1 Pos.	
		(Germany) von Brauchitsch; Mercedes-Benz		(Italy); Zehender; Maserati	
3rd Row	3 Pos.		2 Pos.		1 Pos.
	(Monaco); Chiron; Alfa Romeo		(Germany); Caracciola; Mercedes-Benz		(France); Étancelin; Maserati
4th Row		2 Pos.		1 Pos.	
		(United Kingdom); Mays; ERA		(Switzerland); Ruesch; Maserati	
5th Row	3 Pos.		2 Pos.		1 Pos.
	(Italy); Fagioli; Mercedes-Benz		(Germany); Rosemeyer; Auto Union		(Italy); Varzi; Auto Union
6th Row		2 Pos.		1 Pos.	
		(Germany); Pietsch; Auto Union		(Hungary); Hartmann; Maserati	
7th Row	3 Pos.		2 Pos.		1 Pos.
	(Italy); Taruffi; Bugatti		(Germany); Lang; Mercedes-Benz		(Italy); Ghersi; Maserati
8th Row		2 Pos.		1 Pos.	
		(Italy); Brivio; Alfa Romeo		(Germany); Geier; Mercedes-Benz	

== Notes ==
- Ernst von Delius destroyed his car during practice, so he shared Mays' car in the race.

Grand Prix Race
Previous race: 1935 Belgian Grand Prix	1935 Grand Prix season Grandes Épreuves	Next race: 1935 Swiss Grand Prix
Previous race: 1934 German Grand Prix	German Grand Prix	Next race: 1936 German Grand Prix
