= Hugh Hamilton (racing driver) =

British racing driver

Hugh Caulfield Hamilton
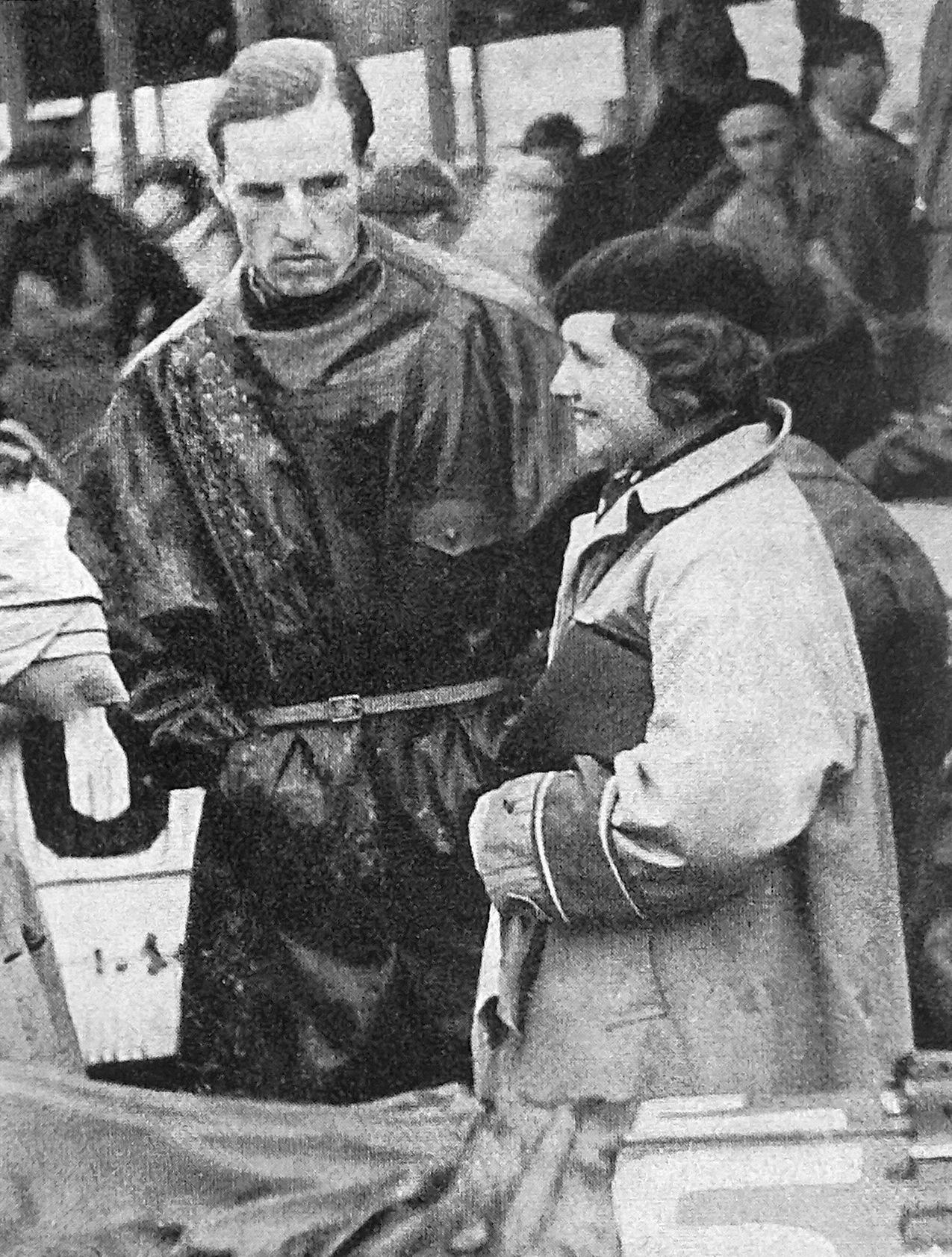
- Hugh Hamilton (MG Midget 750 cc) in an interview with Eliška Junková. He crashed from 2nd place in the race. (Masaryk Grand Prix 1933)
- Nationality: British
- Born: 18 June 1905 Omagh, Ireland
- Died: 26 August 1934 (age 29) Circuit Bremgarten, Switzerland
- Years active: 1930–1934

Hugh 'Hammy' Caulfield Hamilton (18 June 1905 – 26 August 1934) was a British racing driver who was killed in the 1934 Swiss Grand Prix. He was born in Omagh, in County Tyrone, Northern Ireland. It has been said that he was "perhaps the top British driver at that time [before his death]". He raced with Dick Seaman on occasion, and was good friends with him.

== Early life ==
Hamilton was born in Northern Ireland and moved to England in 1922. He started off as an MG salesman. He took up racing motorbikes and then in 1930 started car racing with a Riley.

== Races ==
Race	Date	Car	Position
2 x 12 h Brooklands	10.05.1930	Riley Brooklands 9	3
2 x 12 h Brooklands	09.05.1931	MG M-type	3
RAC Tourist Trophy	22.08.1931	MG M-type	DNF
JCC 1000-Mile Brooklands	04.06.1932	MG C-Type	DNF
Großer Preis von Deutschland, Nürburgring	17.07.1932	MG C-Type	Outright win
RAC Tourist Trophy	20.08.1932	MG C-Type	DNS
500 mile Brooklands	24.09.1932	Bugatti T51	DNF
Mille Miglia	09.04.1933	MG Magnette K3	22
EifelRennen, Nurburgring	28.05.1933	MG Midget J4	Class win
RAC Tourist Trophy	02.09.1933	MG Midget J4	2
1934 Swiss Grand Prix	26.08.1934	Maserati 8CM	Ret

During the JCC 1000-mile race at Brooklands in 1932, driving A.T. Goldie Gardner's car with whom he shared the driving, the car spun a big-end bearing and the engine was replaced in 3 3/4 hours. Later, the car developed a serious leak from the fuel tank and Hammy and MG mechanic Cecil Cousins had to replace it in the pits.

Two months later at the RAC Tourist Trophy Race on the Ards course outside Belfast, Hammy set the fastest 750cc lap in practice despite the scrutineers insisting he replaces his supercharger before the race. On day two of practice, he lost control between Ballystockart and Dundonald, crashing through the front garden of a local insurance agent after which he required hospital treatment.

For the major EifelRennen race at the Nurburgring in Germany on 28 May, Hamilton had entered the car in the 800cc class – to tackle 12 laps of the demanding 14.2-mile circuit. During the race he kept pace with far more powerful 1,500cc category cars and even the slower Grand Prix machines – finally winning his class by a staggering 24 minutes.

Hugh Hamilton took an outright victory in the 19-lap cyclecar class race of the 1932 Großer Preis von Deutschland at the Nürburgring, which was run concurrently with the main Grand Prix. Driving his MG C-Type, he also set the fastest lap of the race.

== Death ==
Hamilton was racing an MG Midget in the 1933 Masaryk Grand Prix when he crashed after his waterproof cape blew over his eyes. He seemed to have fully recovered from the three broken ribs and internal injuries that he sustained, which led to his taking up racing again the following year.

In the 1934 Swiss Grand Prix, Hamilton, driving a Maserati 8CM, crashed into a fir tree after his front left tyre failed at 150 km/h around 1500 meters from the finishing point. Two spectators were hurt in the crash. A post mortem revealed that his heart stopped before the crash, which led to the feeling that his heart stopping was the result of his crash in 1933.

Hamilton's funeral was arranged by the British consul and Dick Seaman, and was held in Bern.
