= Mercedes-Benz W25 =

Racing car by Mercedes-Benz

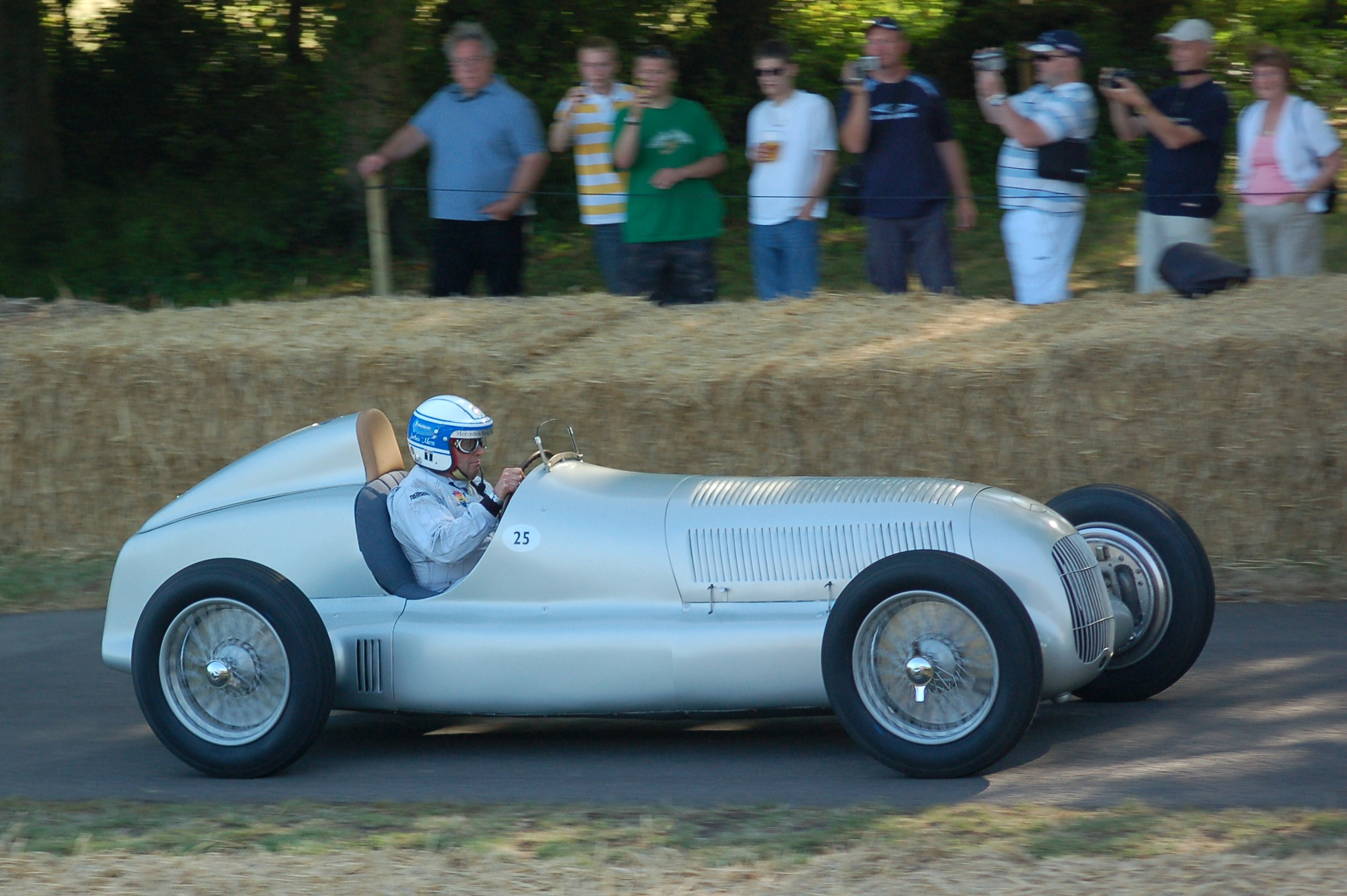
- Category: Grand Prix
- Constructor: Mercedes-Benz
- Designers: Hans Nibel; Max Sailer; Albert Heess; Max Wagner
- Successor: Mercedes-Benz W125

Technical specifications
- Chassis: U-Section Pressed Steel Frame
- Suspension (front): Double Wishbones w/Coil Springs & Friction Dampers
- Suspension (rear): Swing Axle w/Transverse Quarter Elliptic Springs, Friction Dampers
- Engine: M25 3,360 cc (205.0 cu in) later 4,300 cc (262.4 cu in) I8 supercharged front-engine, longitudinally mounted
- Transmission: Mercedes-Benz 5-speed
- Power: 280–494 horsepower (209–368 kW)

Competition history
- Notable entrants: Daimler-Benz AG
- Notable drivers: Rudolf Caracciola; Luigi Fagioli; Manfred von Brauchitsch
- Debut: 1934 Avusrennen
- Drivers' Championships: 1 (1935, Rudolf Caracciola)

The Mercedes-Benz W25 is a Grand Prix racing car designed by Daimler-Benz AG for the 1934 Grand Prix season, in which new rules were introduced, and no championship was held. In 1935, the European Championship was resumed, and it was won by Rudolf Caracciola in a W25. In modified form, the W25 remained in use until 1937, when it was succeeded by the Mercedes-Benz W125.

== History ==
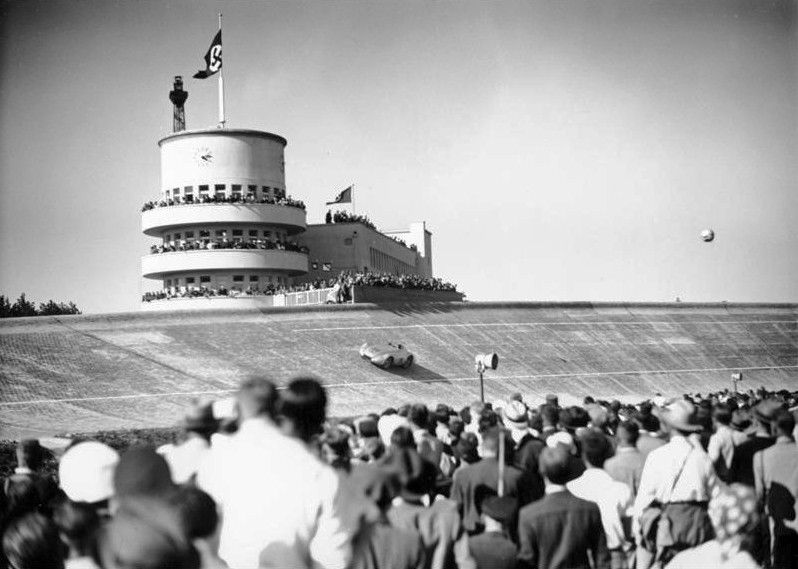
Streamlined W25K #36 of Manfred von Brauchitsch in the banked AVUS north turn, 1937

For the 1934 season, Grand Prix racing's governing body AIACR introduced a formula limited mainly by a maximum weight of 750 kg, which was considerably less than the weight of Daimler's previous car used in racing, the outdated seven litre Mercedes-Benz SSK. That range of cars had been developed in the 1920s by Ferdinand Porsche, who was by now independent, and proposed his P-Wagen project racing car concept to the chancellor in office since January 1933: Adolf Hitler. He decided to support both the new company Auto Union, who took over Porsche's concept, and Mercedes-Benz, who had more than a quarter century of experience in major international racing.

Despite reducing weight and engine size to roughly half, Daimler engineers soon managed to get more power from the supercharged Straight-8 M25 engine than the maximum 300 hp of the SSK. While the W25 was developed in 1933, the first appearance was scheduled to be at the 1934 Avusrennen in Berlin, held on May 27. Mercedes showed up, but after encountering carburetor or fuel pump problems in practice, withdrew from the race. The next entry a week later, again on home soil, at the Nürburgring Eifelrennen, was successful, with Manfred von Brauchitsch winning. It is often claimed that this race was the beginning of the Silver Arrows, but it since has been proven that already in 1932 at the AVUS, v. Brauchitsch had raced an SSKL covered with streamline aluminium sheets, which had been described as a silver arrow by the media. Besides, both German rounds were run to Formula libre rules to attract more entries.

In 1934, the W25 won four major races (Eifelrennen, Coppa Acerbo, Spanish and Italian GP) compared to three for Auto Union (German, Swiss and Czechoslovak GP), plus the Klausenpass hillclimbing event. These popular uphill races were usually dominated by the superior traction of the mid engine Auto Union of Hans Stuck, who won at Felsberg, Kesselberg, Freiburg Schauinsland and Mont Ventoux. The German cars also took two wins in Italy, where the major competitors came from. On the other hand, two events on the soil of World War I adversaries ended rather embarrassingly. The 1934 French Grand Prix held near Paris had been a disaster for both German teams, as none of their cars finished. The 1934 Belgian Grand Prix was held on the Circuit de Spa-Francorchamps which then had a tight corner named after the nearby Ancienne Douane, the old customs station at the former border with Germany. The border had been moved after the war, but the Belgians set up an even tighter chicane for the Germans: Custom officials demanded a hefty sum of duty for the special race fuel containing alcohol which was consumed by the supercharged German engines. Both teams withdrew with short notice.

In 1935, the European Championship was resumed, and Rudolf Caracciola took the title by winning three of five championship events. Luigi Fagioli also contributed three to the nine Grand Prix wins of the W25, which in that year was also designated W25B. Auto Union added some more wins, and the government-backed German manufacturer mostly dominated the sport. Nuvolari famously won the 1935 German Grand Prix, but his Alfa Romeo was the only non-German car to win a European Championship race from 1935 to 1939.

Development of the chassis and the car had allowed to increase capacity to more than 4 litre, and output of the new engine version M25C was well over 400 hp. As the M25 engines became unreliable when enlarged to 4.7 litre and 490 hp, a V12 engine was tested, but it proved too heavy. To accommodate it, the chassis was lightened and shortened (thus K for kurz), but this worsened handling. Thus, in 1936, the W25K was often beaten by Auto Union's Bernd Rosemeyer. Only Caracciola could take two wins, one at the twisty circuit of the very wet 1936 Monaco Grand Prix. Mercedes decided to skip the rest of the season to concentrate on development. By driving the race car himself, young engineer Rudolf Uhlenhaut determined that the W25 had a too stiff suspension in a too soft chassis, which made handling difficult. Even though new rules would come in effect in 1938, he set out to develop a new car for 1937, the Mercedes-Benz W125, which was very successful in the season it was made for.

For the 1937 Avusrennen, two Streamline V12-powered W25K were entered, as weight and handling was of low importance at the AVUS which had been fitted with a banked north turn. Streamline variants were also used for records attempts.

As part of a partnership between Mercedes-Benz and Nintendo, the Wii U game Mario Kart 8 and its Nintendo Switch port Mario Kart 8 Deluxe feature a W25 Silver Arrow as a playable in-game vehicle, added as part of a post-launch downloadable game update on August 27, 2014.

== Specifications ==
Parameters	Data				
Release year	1934	1935	1935	1936	
engine type	W25A	W25AB	W25B	W25C	W25K
engine	Eight-cylinder four-stroke in-line engine, 5 crankshaft bearings, 2 updraft carburetors (Mercedes-Benz), 2 overhead camshafts with spur gear drive, 4-valve technology, 1 Roots compressor, water cooling				
displacement	3364 cm^{3}	3718 cm^{3}	3992 cm^{3}	4309 cm^{3}	4740 cm^{3}
bore × stroke	78 × 88 mm	82 × 88 mm	82 × 94.5mm	82 × 102 mm	86 x 102mm
Power (Mean)	314 hp at 5800 rpm	348 hp at 5800 rpm	370 hp at 5800 rpm	402 hp at 5500 rpm	453 hp at 5800 rpm
gear	4-speed gearbox (installed on the rear axle), gate shifter to the right of the driver's seat				
Chassis	U-profile-ladder frame				
Front suspension	double wishbones with coil springs				
Rear suspension	Oscillating axle (pendulum axle) with quarter-elliptic leaf springs				De Dion axle, Quarter elliptic leaf springs
shock absorber	Friction shock absorbers				hydraulic dampers
Brakes	drum brakes (hydraulic operated)				
Wheelbase	2717 mm				2464 mm
Track front/rear	1422/1473				
Tank capacity	215 liters W25				

== Gallery ==
1934 Mercedes-Benz W25
Mercedes-Benz W25 at Goodwood Festival of Speed 2009

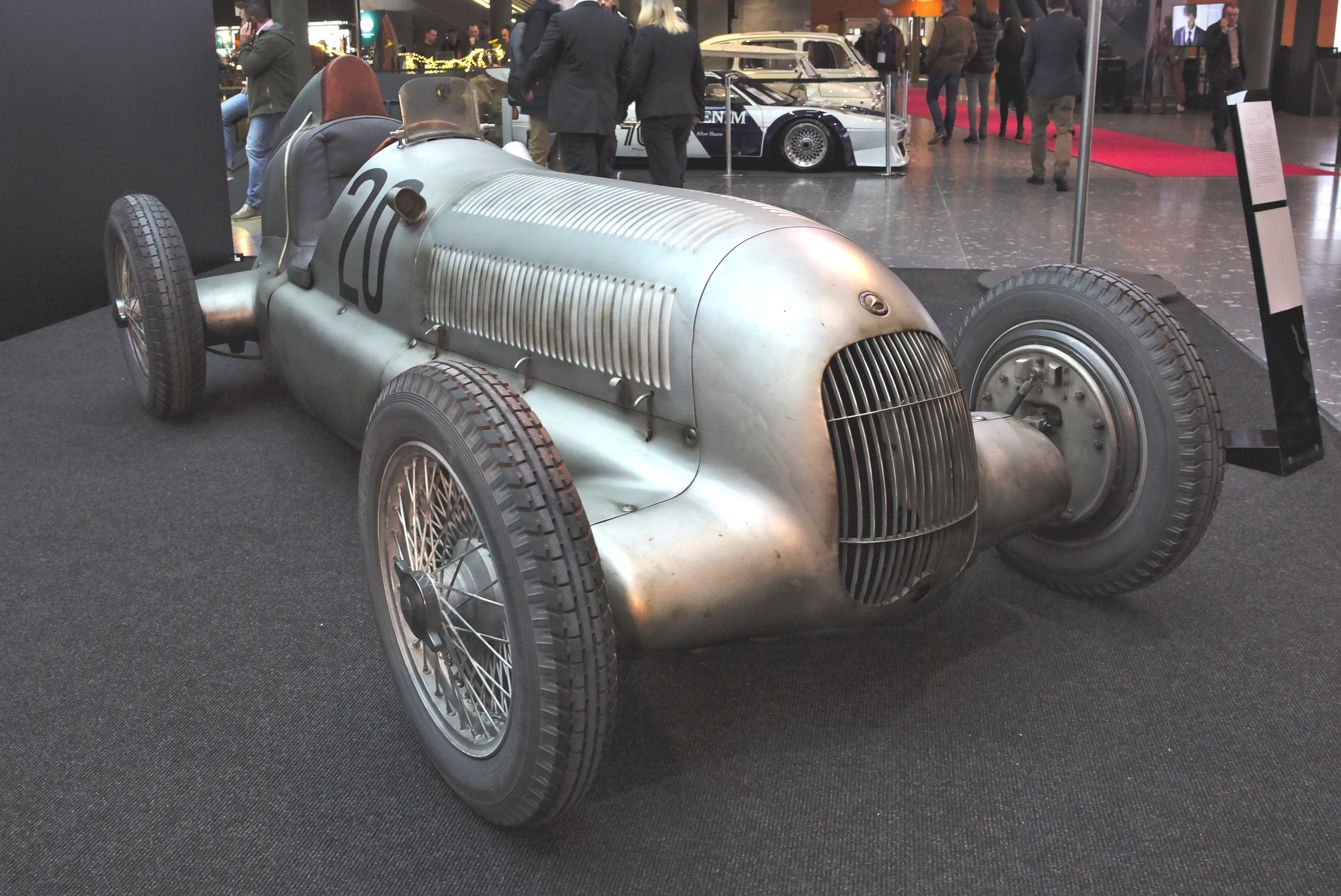

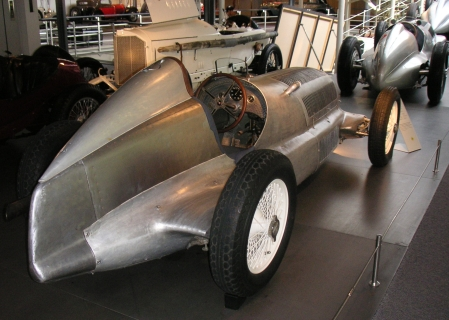

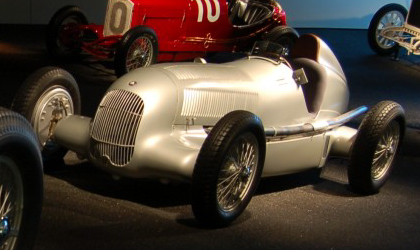

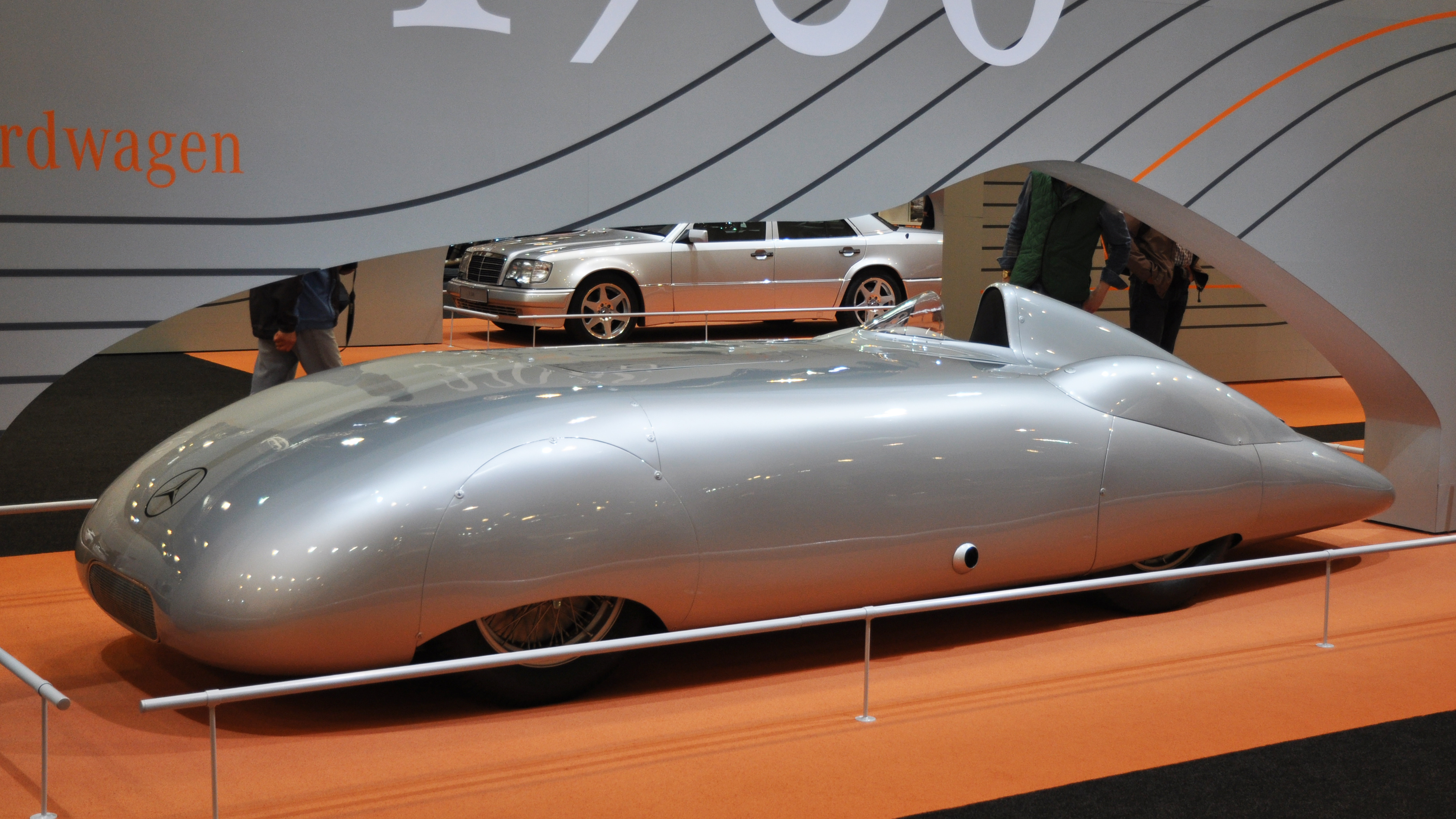
1936 W25 Streamline for land speed record

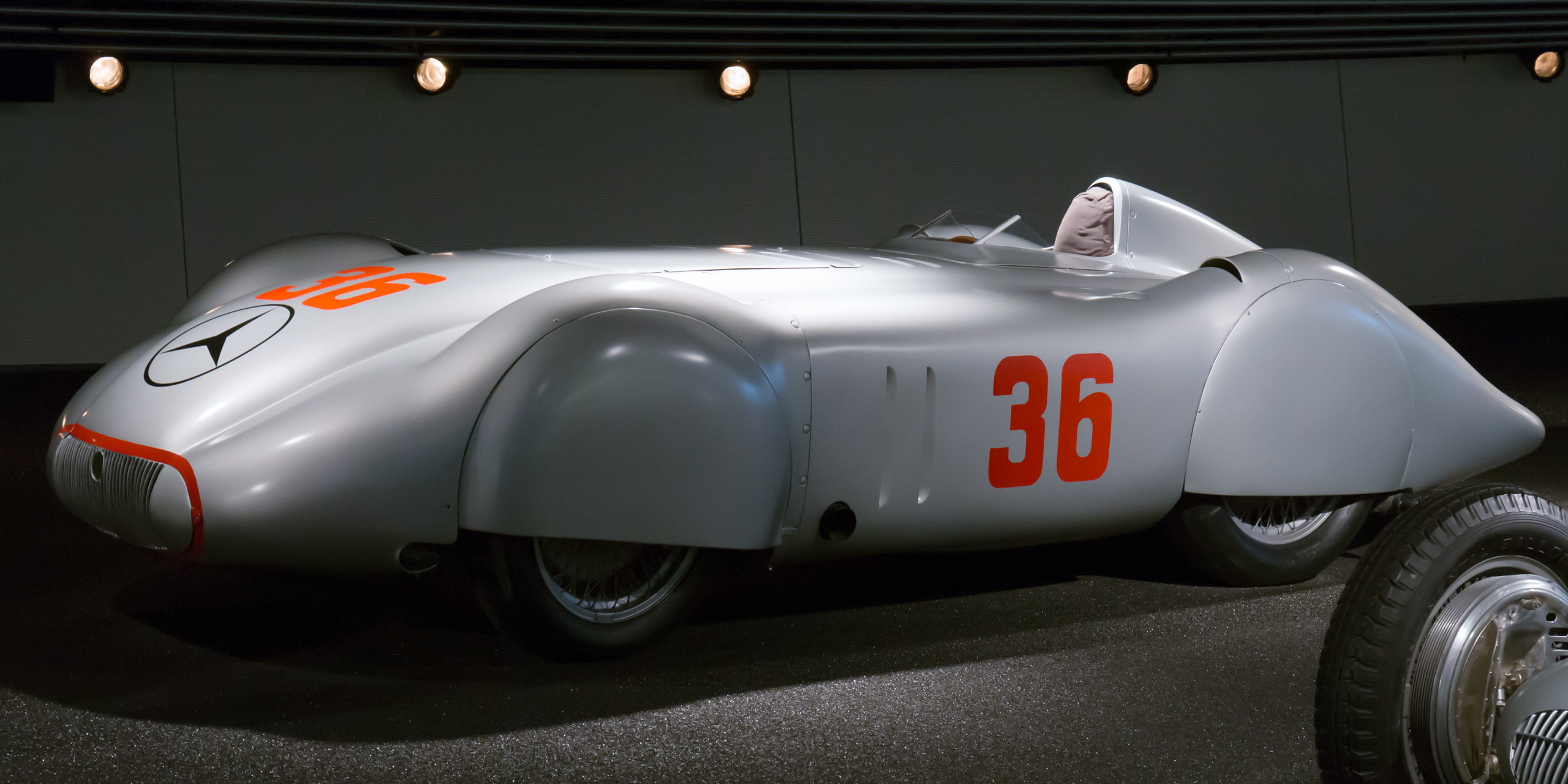
1937 W25 Streamline for Avusrennen
