= Hans Stuck =

German racing driver (1900–1978)

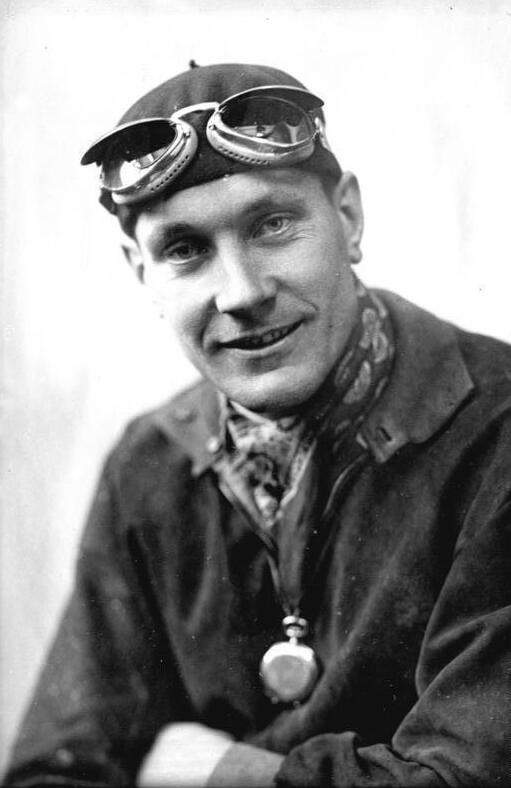
- Stuck in 1929
- Born: Hans Erich Karl Josef Stuck; 27 December 1900; Warsaw, Congress Poland, Russian Empire
- Died: 9 February 1978 (aged 77); Grainau, West Germany

Formula One World Championship career
- Nationality: (West Germany) German
- Active years: 1951 – 1953
- Team(s): BRM, AFM, privateer Ferrari
- Entries: 5 (3 starts)
- Championships: 0
- Wins: 0
- Podiums: 0
- Career points: 0
- Pole positions: 0
- Fastest laps: 0
- First entry: 1951 Italian Grand Prix
- Last entry: 1953 Italian Grand Prix

Hans Erich Karl Josef Stuck (German pronunciation: [hans ʃtʊk]; sometimes called Hans Stuck von Villiez; 27 December 1900 – 9 February 1978) was a German motor racing driver. Both his son Hans-Joachim Stuck (born 1951) and his grandsons Johannes and Ferdinand Stuck became race drivers.

Despite many successes in Grand Prix motor racing for Auto Union in the early 1930s, during the era of the famous "Silver Arrows", he is now mostly known for his domination of hillclimbing, which earned him the nickname "Bergkönig" or "King of the Mountains".

== Pre-WWII career ==
Stuck's experience with car racing started in 1922 with early morning runs bringing milk from his farm to Munich, shortly after his first marriage. This eventually led to his taking up hill-climbing; he won his first race, at Baden-Baden, in 1923. A few years later, after a year as a privateer for Austro-Daimler, he became a works driver for them in 1927, doing well in hill climbs, and making his first appearance in a circuit race (the German Grand Prix) that year as well. In 1931, Austro-Daimler left racing, and Stuck eventually wound up driving a Mercedes-Benz SSKL in sports car racing, where he continued to excel.

In 1933, his acquaintance with Adolf Hitler (whom he had met by chance on a hunting trip in 1925) led to his involvement with Ferdinand Porsche and Auto Union in Hitler's plans for German auto racing. With his experience from racing up mountain passes in the Alps in the 1920s, he was virtually unbeatable when he got the new Auto Union car, which was designed by Porsche. Its rear mounted engine provided superior traction compared to conventional front engine designs, so that its (eventually) 500+ horse-power could be transformed into speed even on non-paved roads. In circuit racing, the new car was very hard to master, though, due to the swing axle rear suspension design in combination of the weight distribution of its rear engine design.

Stuck's career with Auto Union was quite successful. In 1934, he won the German, Swiss and Czechoslovakian Grand Prix races (as well as finishing second in the Italian Grand Prix and Eifelrennen). There was no European Championship for the circuit races that year, or he would have won it. Wins in a number of hill-climb races brought him European Mountain Champion, the first of three he would eventually collect.

In 1935, Stuck won the Italian Grand Prix (along with second at the German Grand Prix; he also won his usual collection of hill-climb wins, again taking the European Mountain Championship. 1936 was leaner; he placed second in the Tripoli and German Grands Prix, finishing second in the competition for the European Championship. After Stuck missed a number of hill-climbs because of injuries suffered in accidents, that year the European Mountain Championship fell to his famous team-mate, Bernd Rosemeyer. 1937 was equally lean, bringing only second places in the 1937 Rio de Janeiro Grand Prix and 1937 Belgian Grand Prix.

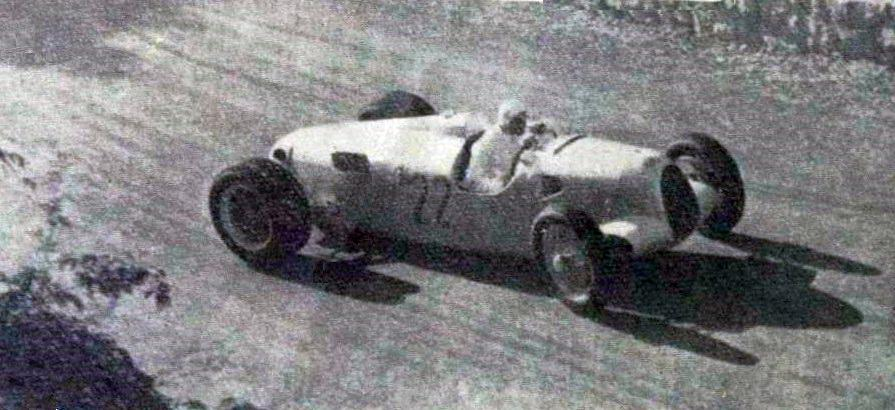
Stuck winning the 1938 La Turbie with a double rear wheel Auto Union Type C

1938 opened poorly; Stuck was either fired from, or quit, the Auto Union team (accounts from the two sides differ). After a series of injuries to other team drivers, as well as pressure from the German government (again, accounts differ as to what combination of factors was the cause), he was re-hired, and proved himself by winning a third European Mountain Championship, his last major pre-war success.

== Post-WWII career ==
After the war, although Germans were banned from racing until 1950, Stuck obtained Austrian citizenship and immediately continued racing. A link with Alex von Falkenhausen (not to be confused with the contemporaneous general of the same name) led to Stuck driving for his team in Formula Two racing, although with little success.

Stuck drove a Porsche Spyder in 1953, also with no success. A liaison with BMW, starting in 1957, was more fruitful, although his first hill-climbs for them (in a Type 507) were not. The unit he drove, chassis 70079, whose next owner was the then US Army Private Elvis Presley, disappeared from sight until 2014, when BMW Classic found it and restored it, the car now being the most valuable in BMW's history, its cost estimated at $17.9m. Stuck's ultimate move to their tiny BMW 700 RS did the trick and, at age 60, he became the German Hillclimb Champion for the last time. He decided to retire on a high note, and thereupon closed his professional driving career.

As an instructor on the Nürburgring, Stuck taught his son Hans-Joachim the secrets of this challenging circuit.

== Personal life ==
Stuck was born in Warsaw in 1900. Although his parents were of Swiss ancestry, they had moved to Germany by the time Stuck was born, and he grew up there.

Stuck was called up for military service in World War I in 1917. In 1918, his older brother Walter was killed, along with Walter's commanding officer; as a result, Stuck met the commander's sister, Ellen Hahndorff, and they were married in 1922. After several years, Stuck's involvement in the fast life on the track as well as off it caused them to split up and divorce.

In 1931, Stuck met Paula von Reznicek, a famous tennis player; they were married in 1932. The fact that she had a Jewish grandfather caused Stuck some problems with the rise of the Nazis, but his personal relationship with Hitler saved him from serious trouble.

In 1939, Stuck met Christa Thielmann, at that point engaged to Paula's youngest brother. Stuck and Paula divorced in 1948, and he married Christa that year. Their son, Hans-Joachim Stuck, was born in 1951. Christa died in 2014, at the age of 93.

== Racing record ==
=== Complete European Championship results ===
(key) (Races in bold indicate pole position) (Races in italics indicate fastest lap)

Year	Entrant	Chassis	Engine	1	2	3	4	5	6	7	EDC	Pts
1932	Wilhelm Merck	Mercedes-Benz SSKL	Mercedes-Benz 7.1 L6	ITA	FRA	GER; DNS					—^{1}	
1935	Auto Union AG	Auto Union B	Auto Union 5.6 V16	MON	FRA; Ret	BEL					5th	36
1935	Auto Union AG	Auto Union B	Auto Union 5.0 V16				**GER**; 2	SUI; 11	ITA; 1	ESP; Ret	5th	36
1936	Auto Union AG	Auto Union C	Auto Union 6.0 V16	MON; 3	GER; 2	SUI; 3	ITA; Ret				2nd	15
1937	Auto Union AG	Auto Union C	Auto Union 6.0 V16	BEL; 2	GER; Ret	MON; 4	SUI; 4	ITA; 9			5th	20
1938	Auto Union AG	Auto Union D	Auto Union 3.0 V12	FRA	GER; 3	SUI; 4	ITA; Ret				5th	20
1939	Auto Union AG	Auto Union D	Auto Union 3.0 V12	BEL	FRA; 6	GER; Ret	SUI; 10				9th	23

Notes

- **^1** – Not listed in the Championship.

=== Complete Formula One World Championship results ===
(key)

Year	Entrant	Chassis	Engine	1	2	3	4	5	6	7	8	9	WDC	Pts
1951	BRM Ltd	BRM P15	BRM P15 1.5 V16 s	SUI	500	BEL	FRA	GBR	GER	ITA; DNS	ESP		NC	0
1952	AFM	AFM 6	Küchen 2.0 V8	SUI; Ret	500	BEL	FRA	GBR	GER	NED			NC	0
1952	Ecurie Espadon	Ferrari 212	Ferrari 166 2.0 V12								ITA; DNQ		NC	0
1953	Hans Stuck	AFM 6	Bristol BS1 2.0 L6	ARG	500	NED	BEL	FRA	GBR	GER; Ret	SUI	ITA; 14	NC	0

== Bibliography ==
- Hans Stuck and E. G. Burggaller (editors), Motoring Sport (G.T. Foulis, London, 1935) Although this is a collection of items by various writers, it does contain a number of items by Stuck

Sporting positions
Preceded by None	European Hill Climb Champion (for Racing Cars); 1930	Succeeded by Juan Zanelli
Preceded by Rudolf Caracciola	European Hill Climb Champion (for Sports Cars); 1932	Succeeded by Mario Tadini
Preceded by None	German Mountain Climb Champion; 1934-1935	Succeeded by Bernd Rosemeyer
Preceded by Bernd Rosemeyer	German Mountain Climb Champion; 1937-1938	Succeeded by Hermann Lang
