= Circuit Bremgarten =

Swiss race track

- Grand Prix Circuit (1931–1955)
- Location: Bern, Switzerland
- Coordinates: 46°57′00″N 7°24′39″E
- Opened: 1931
- Closed: 1955
- Major events: Formula One; Swiss Grand Prix (1934–1939, 1947–1954); Grand Prix motorcycle racing Swiss motorcycle Grand Prix (1931–1937, 1947, 1949, 1951–1954); Sidecar World Championship (1949, 1951–1954)

Grand Prix Circuit (1931–1955)
- Length: 7.280 km (4.524 mi)
- Turns: 13
- Race lap record: 2:34.500 ( (Germany) Bernd Rosemeyer, Auto Union C, 1936, GP)

The Circuit Bremgarten was a 7.280 km (4.524 mi) motorsport race track in Bern, Switzerland, which formerly hosted the Swiss Grand Prix from 1933 to 1954 (Grand Prix/Formula One/Formula Two) and the Swiss motorcycle Grand Prix in 1949 and from 1951 until 1954. Additional Bern Grands Prix were run for Voiturette, Formula Two and sportscars.

Bremgarten was built as a motorcycle racing track in 1931 in the Bremgartenwald (Bremgarten forest) in the north of Bern, well outside of the separate municipality Bremgarten bei Bern. The circuit itself had no true main straight, instead being a collection of high-speed corners. It hosted its first automobile race in 1934, which claimed the life of driver Hugh Hamilton. In 1948 it claimed the life of Italian racer Achille Varzi. From the outset, Bremgarten's tree-lined roads, often poor light conditions and changes in road surface made for what was acknowledged to be a very dangerous circuit, especially in the wet.

== 1955 ban ==
In reaction to the June 1955 Le Mans disaster, motor racing for position with passing and the risk of collisions like in Le Mans was banned in Switzerland, with the exception of hillclimbing and rallying which are time trial runs of single vehicles. The August 21 1955 Swiss Grand Prix was cancelled, thus Bremgarten has not hosted an official motorsport event since 1954.

Although there were 1975 Swiss Grand Prix (non-championship) and 1982 Swiss Grand Prix, they took place in France, at Dijon-Prenois. On June 6, 2007 an amendment to lift the ban was passed by the lower house of the Swiss parliament, 97 in favour and 77 opposed. The legislation failed to pass the upper house, and was withdrawn in 2009 after being rejected twice.

For electric cars, the circuit racing ban was lifted, and Switzerland hosted its first international motor race in 64 years when the 2018 Zurich ePrix was held as a round of the all-electric Formula E championship. The 2019 Swiss ePrix was held in Bern although the bankruptcy of race organizers has led to it not returning in following years.

In 2022, the racing ban was lifted altogether, allowing races to take place within Switzerland in non-electric vehicles.

== Motorcycle racing ==
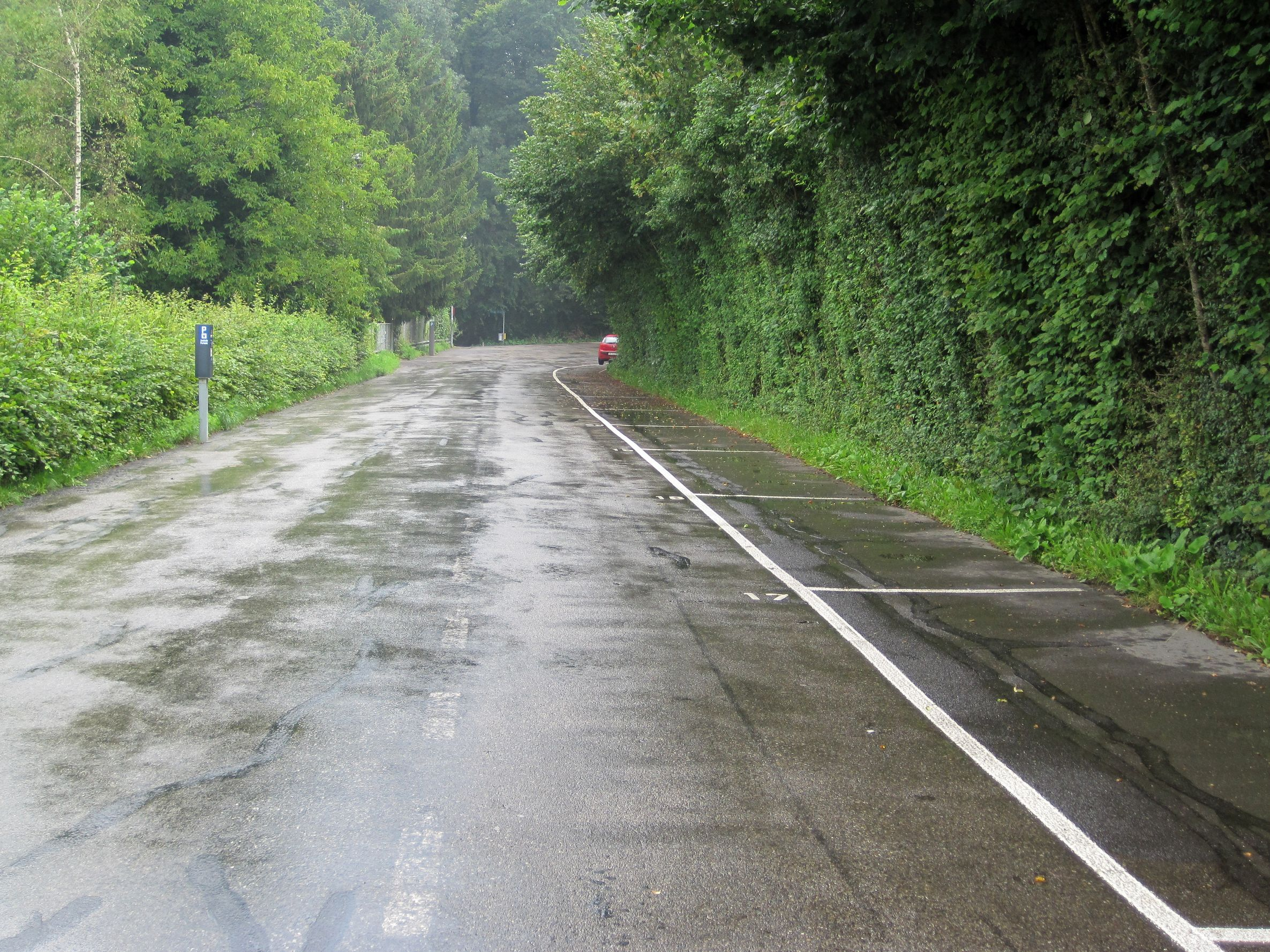
Tenni-Curve in 2014

The Grand Prix of Bern took place at Bremgarten from 1931 to 1937 and also in 1947 and 1948. In August 1931 the Bern (Swiss) Grand Prix took place and the Irish motorcyclist Stanley Woods won the 500cc event on a Norton. He won three more events here; 1932 350cc and 500cc races and 1933 500cc race also on a Norton. Jimmie Guthrie won the 350cc and 500cc races in 1937.

The Bremgarten Circuit was one of the original rounds of the Grand Prix motorcycle World Championship during the inaugural season of 1949 and from 1951 to 1954. Famous riders who raced here included: Hans Stärkle, Freddie Frith and Geoff Duke. Italian racer Omobono Tenni was killed at Bremgarten during practice for the 1948 event.

== Bern Grand Prix ==
Additional races were held as Grosser Preis von Bern (Bern Grand Prix), like the 1939 Bern Grand Prix and 1952 Bern Grand Prix.

== Traces ==
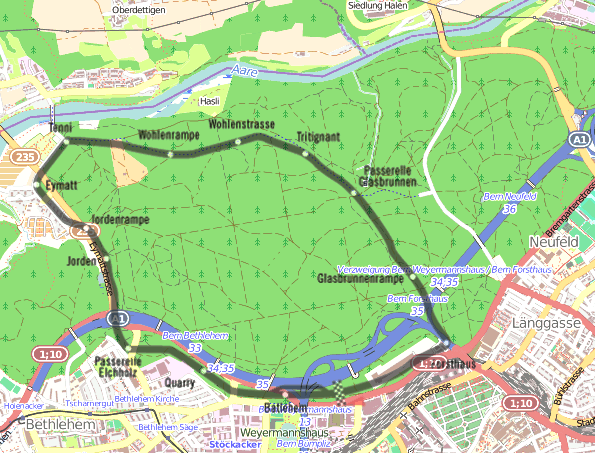
Circuit Bremgartenwald in modern time

Most of the circuit is gone, built over, or was reduced to a bicycle track in the forest without consideration to conservation. Only the northwestern part, the right hand curves Eymatt and Tenni, and sections in the forest remain both paved and on the original layout.

== Lap records ==
At the Nürburgring, the lap record set in the 1930s by the Silver Arrows GP cars was not beaten until 1957, and in case of Bremgarten, never, as F1 in 1954 was still 5 seconds too slow, and Swiss racing was banned afterwards.

The fastest official race lap records at the Circuit Bremgarten are listed as:

Category	Time	Driver	Vehicle	Event
Grand Prix Circuit (1931–1955): 7.280 km (4.524 mi)
GP	2:34.500	Bernd Rosemeyer	Auto Union C	1936 Swiss Grand Prix
Formula One	2:39.700	Juan Manuel Fangio	Mercedes-Benz W196	1954 Swiss Grand Prix
500cc	2:41.200	Rod Coleman	AJS Porcupine	1953 Swiss motorcycle Grand Prix
Formula Two	2:41.300	Alberto Ascari	Ferrari 500 F2	1953 Swiss Grand Prix
Voiturette	2:46.500	Giuseppe Farina	Alfa Romeo 158	1939 Bern Grand Prix
350cc	2:54.500	Geoff Duke	Norton Kneeler	1952 Swiss motorcycle Grand Prix
Sports prototype	2:56.100	Hermann Lang	Mercedes-Benz 300 SL	1952 Bern Grand Prix
250cc	3:00.900	Reg Armstrong	NSU Rennmax 250	1953 Swiss motorcycle Grand Prix
Sidecar	3:13.700	Eric Oliver	Norton Manx	1953 Swiss motorcycle Grand Prix
125cc	3:42.500	Nello Pagani	Mondial 125SS	1949 Swiss motorcycle Grand Prix
