= 1934 German Grand Prix =

- 1934 Grand Prix season

Race details
- Date: 15 July 1934
- Official name: VII Großer Preis von Deutschland
- Location: Nürburgring; Nürburg, Germany
- Course: Permanent racing facility
- Course length: 22.810 km (14.17 miles)
- Distance: 25 laps, 570.25 km (354.25 miles)
- Weather: Wet, overcast

Pole position
Driver	(Italy) Renato Balestrero	Alfa Romeo
- Grid positions set by ballot

Fastest lap
Driver	(Germany) Hans Stuck	Auto Union
- Time: 10:43.8

Podium
First	(Germany) Hans Stuck	Auto Union
Second	(Italy) Luigi Fagioli	Mercedes-Benz
Third	(Monaco) Louis Chiron	Scuderia Ferrari

The 1934 German Grand Prix was a Grand Prix motor race held at the Nürburgring on 15 July 1934.

== Classification ==
=== Race ===
Pos	No	Driver	Team	Car	Laps	Time/Retired	Grid
1	1	(Germany) Hans Stuck	Auto Union	Auto Union Type A	25	4:38:19.2	10
2	9	(Italy) Luigi Fagioli	Daimler-Benz AG	Mercedes-Benz W25	25	+2:07.0	13
3	18	(Monaco) Louis Chiron	Scuderia Ferrari	Alfa Romeo Tipo B	25	+8:13.6	5
4	12	(Italy) Tazio Nuvolari	Scuderia Ferrari	Alfa Romeo Tipo B	25	+16:51"0	4
5	1	(Germany) Hanns Geier	Daimler-Benz AG	Mercedes-Benz W25	25	+20:46"2	19
Dsq.	12	(Switzerland) Ulrich Maag	Privé	Alfa Romeo Monza	25	+ 28:30"3	9
6 ?	20	(Italy) Goffredo Zehender	Maserati	Maserati 8CM	25	+36:25"6 (or +5 Laps / Gearbox ?)	7
7 ?	11	(Hungary) László Hartmann	Bugatti	Bugatti T51	24 (or 25 ?)	+35:39"2	12
Ret.	2	(Germany) August Momberger	Auto Union	Auto Union Type A	23	Mechanical	15
Ret.	2	(Germany) Ernst Burggaller	Auto Union	Auto Union Type A	23	Mechanical	15
Ret.	14	(Switzerland) Hans Ruesch	Private entry	Maserati 8CM	19	Gas Pump	17
Ret.	15	(Italy) Luigi Soffietti	Scuderia Siena	Alfa Romeo Monza	14	Rear axle	16
Ret.	6	(Germany) Rudolf Caracciola	Daimler-Benz AG	Mercedes-Benz W25	14	Engine	8
Ret.	21	(Italy) Giovanni Minozzi	Scuderia Siena	Alfa Romeo Monza	10	Engine	1
Ret.	19	(France) Guy Moll	Scuderia Ferrari	Alfa Romeo Tipo B	6	Gearbox	14
Ret.	3	(Germany) Ernst Burggaller	Auto Union	Auto Union Type A	4	Gearbox	18
Ret.	16	(Italy) Renato Balestrero	Gruppo Genovese San Giorgio	Alfa Romeo Monza	3	Gearbox	3
Ret.	17	(Italy) Achille Varzi	Scuderia Ferrari	Alfa Romeo Tipo B	1	Gearbox	11
Ret.	4	(United Kingdom) Hugh Hamilton	Whitney Straight Ltd	Maserati 8CM	0	Piston	2
Ret.	22	(Italy) Attilio Battilana	Gruppo Genovese San Giorgio	Alfa Romeo Monza			6
DNS.	3	(Germany) Paul Pietsch	Auto Union	Auto Union Type A		Reserve driver	
DNS.	5	(Germany) Paul Pietsch	Private entry	Alfa Romeo Monza		Not started	
DNS.	3	(Germany) Wilhelm Sebastian	Auto Union	Auto Union Type A		Reserve driver	
DNS.	7	(Germany) Manfred von Brauchitsch	Daimler-Benz AG	Mercedes-Benz W25		Accident during practice	
DNS.	8	(Germany) Ernst Jakob Henne	Daimler-Benz AG	Mercedes-Benz W25		Reserve driver, ill	

== Starting Grid Positions ==
Starting grid was determined by ballot.

== Notes ==
- Manfred von Brauchitsch badly crashed in practice, and Mercedes employee Hanns Geier was called on short notice to replace him
- www.kolumbus.fi
- www.teamdan.com
- www.racing-database.com

Grand Prix Race
Previous race: 1934 French Grand Prix	1934 Grand Prix season Grandes Épreuves	Next race: 1934 Belgian Grand Prix
Previous race: 1932 German Grand Prix	German Grand Prix	Next race: 1935 German Grand Prix
