= Wilhelm Sebastian =

German racing driver and engineer (1903–78

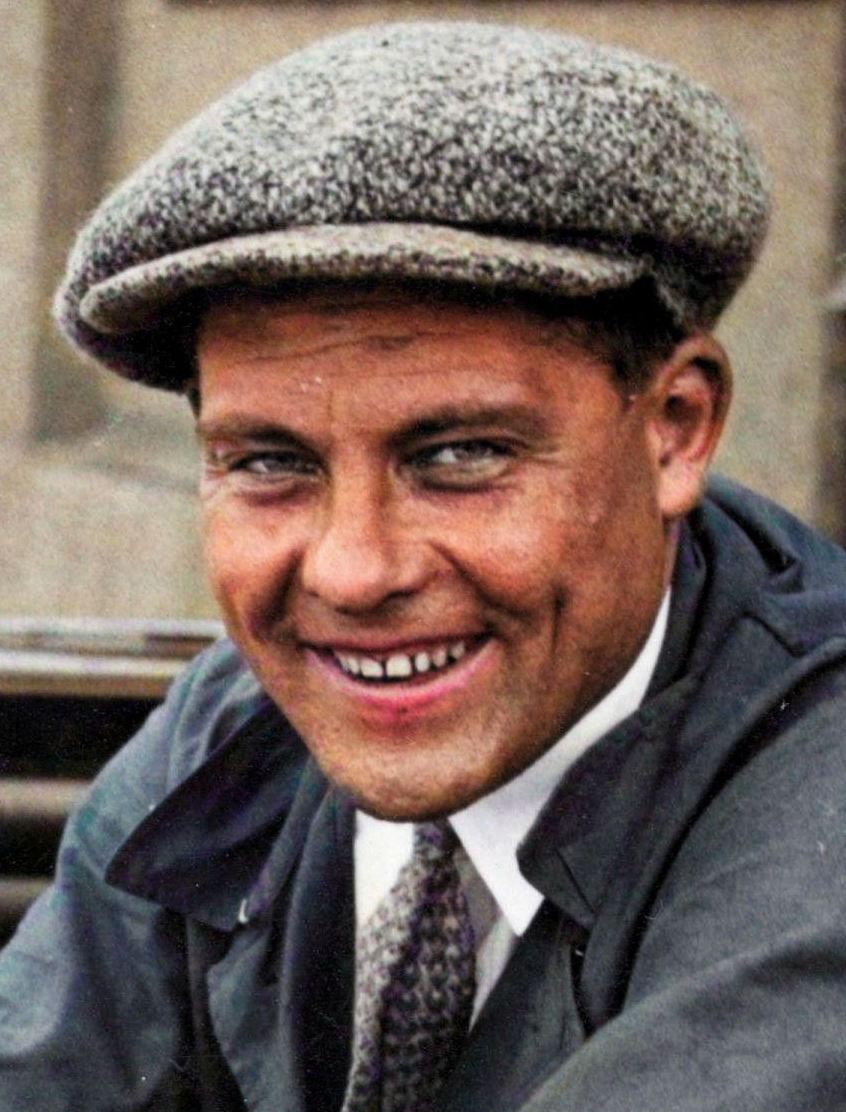
- In 1933
- Born: Wilhelm Sebastian; 17 January 1903 Mannheim, Germany
- Died: 30 October 1978 (aged 75) Weinheim, Germany

Wilhelm Sebastian (17 January 1903 – 30 October 1978) was a Grand Prix racing driver and engineer.

== Racing career ==
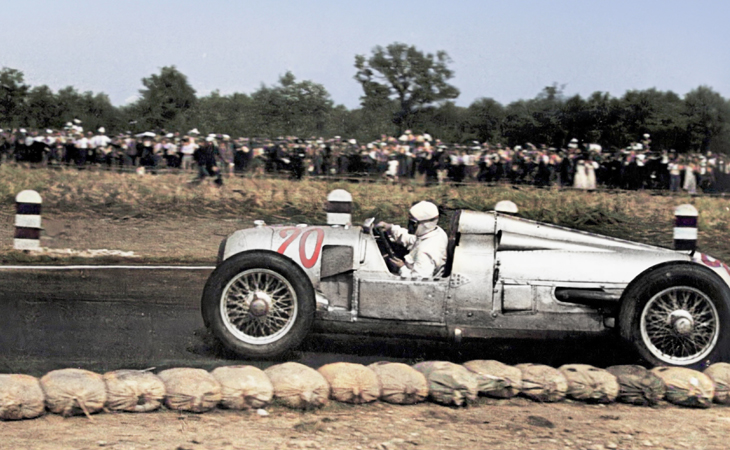
At the 1934 Italian Grand Prix

Sebastian undertook an engineering apprenticeship at Benz and was riding mechanic for Willy Walb at the 1923 Italian Grand Prix. As a riding mechanic his greatest triumph was sharing the Mercedes-Benz SSKL with Rudolf Caracciola which won the 1931 Mille Miglia, the first time the race had been won by a non-Italian outfit. The duo also won the 1931 German Grand Prix, aided by a quick-raising jack which Sebastian and Walb had developed, and which cut down pit stop time. Sebastian had taken the SSKL out in practice to experiment with taking the Karussel banking on the high side, and, finding it a quicker line, reported back to "Caratsch", whose success using it made it de rigueur for future races.

In 1932 he joined a new company founded by Ferdinand Porsche and Alfred Rosenberg with a view to developing a new racing car. The project morphed into the Auto Union team, which also employed Sebastian's brother Ludwig as chief mechanic to Bernd Rosemeyer. In 1934 Walb appointed Sebastian as reserve driver, and he drove in three Grandes Epreuves. At the 1934 Coppa Acerbo, Sebastian replaced an ill August Momberger, and Hans Stuck took over Sebastian's car when Stuck's retired, bringing the car home 5th. At the Italian Grand Prix, Momberger was fit enough to start, but stepped out at a quarter-distance because of blisters from a hot brake pedal; Sebastian took over, leaving the pit management to Porsche for the remainder of the race, and finished 7th. Sebastian's final race was the Masaryk Grand Prix at Brno, which he finished 7th.

== Post-racing ==
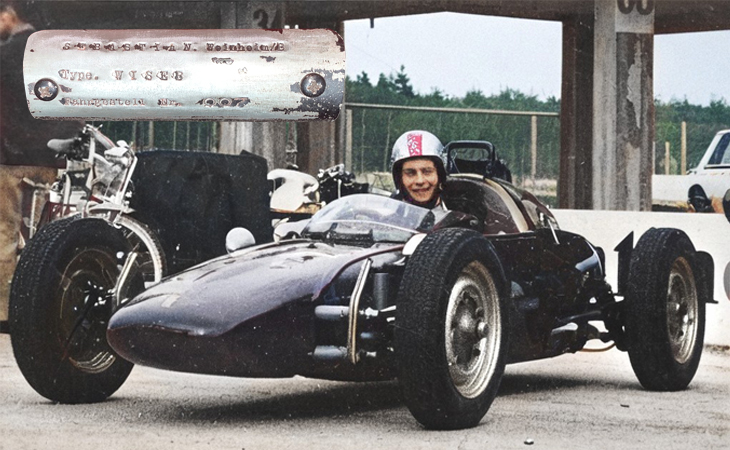
Wolfgang Lutz at the wheel of a WISEB

Sebastian stepped back from the cockpit at the end of the season, not considering himself good enough for Grands Prix. He took on a number of behind-the-scenes roles at Auto Union, which included, according to Alfred Neubauer, spying on the Mercedes-Benz team, hiding in bushes at Hockenheim when Mercedes undertook a supposedly secret test in 1938, only to be spotted by Neubauer.

Sebastian was the last person Rosemeyer spoke to before his death when trying to break a class world record on the Autobahn between Frankfurt and Darmstadt on 28 January 1938; Sebastian had counselled against taking the last run because of the crosswinds.

After the Second World War, he started a Porsche dealership, and in 1965 built a Formula V racing car, named (after the first syllables in his name) the WISEB, driven by (amongst others) Klaus Ludwig.
