= August Momberger =

German racing driver and engineer

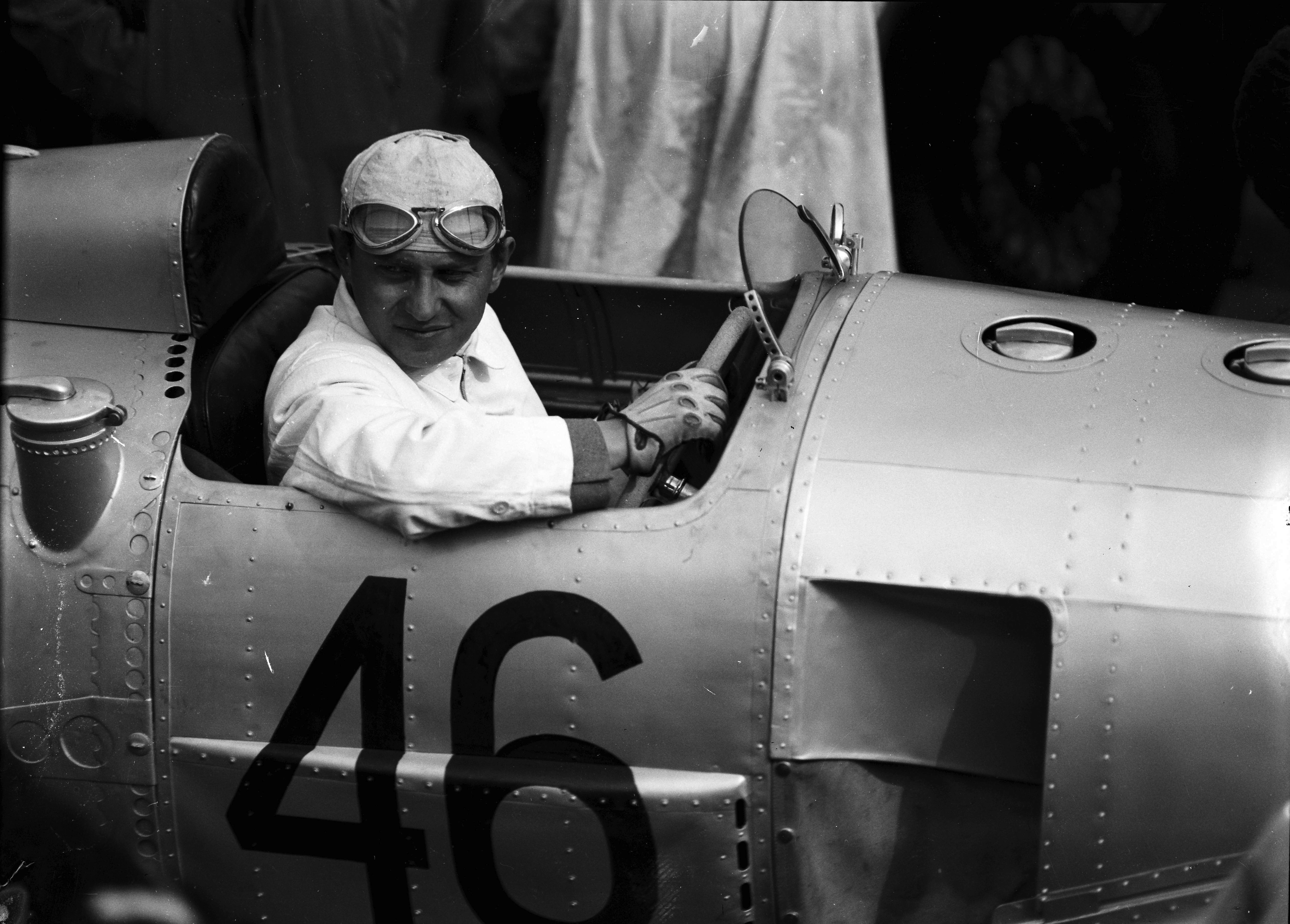
August Momberger in the cockpit of his Auto Union car, during practice for the 1934 Avusrennen

August "Bubi" Momberger (26 June 1905 – 22 December 1969) was a German racing driver and engineer, who competed in Grand Prix motor racing events for various manufacturers between 1926 and 1934. During the 1934 Grand Prix season – the first season of the infamous Silver Arrows period of German dominance of Grand Prix racing, that would last until the outbreak of WWII – he drove for the Auto Union Rennabteilung, and was the first driver of a Silver Arrows car to take a podium finish in a major race. During the season he took a further second-placed finish, and posted two fastest laps, but worsening arthritis and a deteriorating relationship with the Auto Union team manager forced him into retirement before the end of the year. Following his retirement from racing, Momberger returned to his engineering training and rose steadily through the ranks of the German automobile industry, eventually becoming technical director of the Borgward company's Goliath division in Bremen.

== Racing career ==
Born in Wiesbaden, Hesse-Nassau, in 1905, Momberger began racing in hillclimbing events in the early 1920s while he was still an engineering apprentice at the NSU works. In August 1925, he won the International Taunus Race driving an experimental, supercharged NSU 6/60 PS car. In winning this race – a forerunner to the first German Grand Prix the following year – Momberger defeated works entries from many of the international motor industry including Mercedes and Bugatti. Momberger remained with NSU for the 1926 Grand Prix season but was unable to emulate his form of the previous year.

For the 1927 Grand Prix season, Momberger switched his affiliation to Bugatti, and took this new car to the 5000 cc class victory at the inaugural Eifelrennen meeting celebrating the opening of the Nürburgring in June of that year. In September, again driving his Bugatti T35B, he won the 3-litre class at the Rund um die Solitude race on the Solitudering track, near Stuttgart. He retained the Bugatti into 1928, but did not take any notable results during the year, and failed to finish the 1928 German Grand Prix at the Nürburgring.

=== Mercedes-Benz (1929–1931) ===
Momberger joined the Daimler-Benz factory team for the 1929 Grand Prix season, driving the firm's new Mercedes-Benz SSK cars. His first event for his new team was the 1929 Rome Grand Prix. He started from fifth position on the grid, but during the race his car encountered difficulties with its supercharger and he retired at the end of the tenth lap. In July, Momberger was entered for the 1929 German Grand Prix, again to be contested over the full Nürburgring circuit. He finished in third place, behind two Bugattis driven by Louis Chiron and Georges Philippe. Later in the year, Momberger was entered for the Monza Grand Prix. He won the third qualifying heat, but could only finish third in the race final, beaten by Achille Varzi's Alfa Romeo and Tazio Nuvolari in a Talbot.

Following the 1929 season, Momberger retired from racing, but was again drafted as a reserve driver for Mercedes in 1931. However, he did not participate in any events.

=== Auto Union (1934) ===
In 1934 he was hired as a reserve driver by the Auto Union Grand Prix team, to provide support for their primary drivers Hans Stuck and Hermann zu Leiningen. The 1934 season saw the introduction of a new regulation formula for Grand Prix-class racing, which mandated a maximum weight for cars of 750 kg (1,650 lb) and a minimum race distance of 500 km (310 mi). To meet this new challenge, engineer Ferdinand Porsche laid out the design for a novel V16-powered, rear-engined car, that eventually became the Auto Union Type A.

Auto Union decided to delay their entry to the season's racing until their first home event, the 1934 Avusrennen in May. For this race, Auto Union entered three cars, to be driven by Stuck, Leiningen and Momberger. New cars from their compatriots and rivals, Mercedes, had been withdrawn following pump troubles, so the main competition for the Auto Union team came from Scuderia Ferrari's streamlined Alfa Romeos. From the start Stuck took the lead, which he built to over 85 seconds on the high-speed AVUS circuit, before his clutch failed on lap 12 of the planned 15. By this point, Leiningen had already retired with a faulty radiator, so it was left to Momberger to challenge the Italian cars, and he set the fastest lap of the race at an average of over 140 mph (230 km/h) while chasing the lead. Ultimately, he finished the race in third position, almost two minutes behind race winner Guy Moll's Alfa Romeo, but only 18 seconds behind Moll's team mate Achille Varzi.

The Auto Union team's next race, in early June, was also on German soil: the 1934 Eifelrennen on the Nürburgring. For this race, the Mercedes-Benz team brought three fully functional W25 cars to challenge the three Auto Union entries. However, Momberger was unable to lend support to his team leader, Stuck, as his fuel pump failed early in the race. Stuck went on to finish second to Manfred von Brauchitsch's Mercedes.

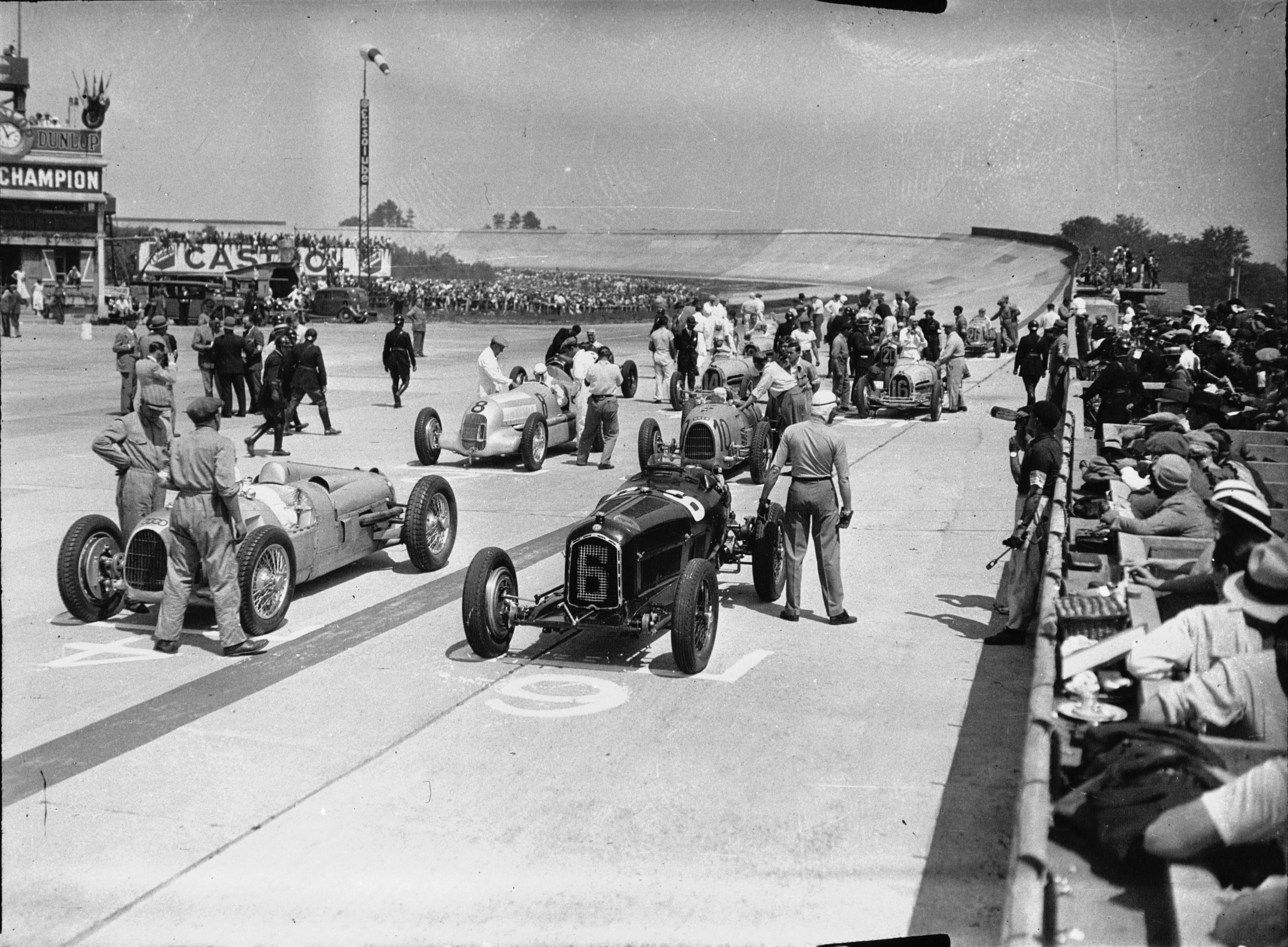
Drivers wait in their cars prior to the start of the 1934 French Grand Prix. Momberger is in car 10, on the second row

The second Grande Épreuve of the season – the 1934 French Grand Prix at the Montlhéry Autodrome on 1 July – again saw all three Auto Union cars entered, although following more fuel pump troubles only Stuck and Momberger started the race. Stuck started from pole position, with Momberger in fourth place in the starting grid ballot. However, from the start Momberger suffered from mechanical problems and rapidly dropped toward the rear of the 13 car field, with only Tazio Nuvolari's misfiring Bugatti behind him, and he became the race's first retirement when his steering finally failed on lap 10.

Two weeks later the Auto Union team entered five cars for their home grand prix, the 1934 German Grand Prix at the Nürburgring, with cars for Stuck and Momberger, joined by Ernst Burggaller, who was standing in for an unwell Leiningen, and reserves Paul Pietsch and Wilhelm Sebastian. During the race the German cars dominated, and Momberger was running in the leading group of cars, in fourth place, albeit more than eight minutes behind the leader, Stuck, after nearly four hours of racing. However, his car hit mechanical trouble on his 20th lap and he was forced to retire.

During the German race, Momberger had injured his head when he hit it on the headrest of his car while going over one of the Nürburgring's numerous bumps, and he had to be replaced by Burggaller (whose own car had already retired) while he had the bleeding attended to. Having missed the next Grande Épreuve due to customs and duty tariff disputes between the German teams and Belgian border agents, for the team's next appearance at the 1934 Coppa Acerbo in August, Auto Union team boss Willi Walb replaced Momberger with Sebastian. However, by the time of the 1934 Swiss Grand Prix at the end of the month Momberger had regained his position in the Auto Union line-up.

For the Circuit Bremgarten race Auto Union entered the established Stuck-Leiningen-Momberger trio. Stuck started from pole position once again, but Momberger's draw in the start ballot placed him alongside Earl Howe on the last row of the grid. In the race Stuck led from the first, although was closely followed by René Dreyfus in a Bugatti T59. Momberger chased the leaders hard, setting the race's fastest lap in the process, and by lap 25 was lying in third position. However, a late stop by Dreyfus to top up his radiator allowed Momberger through into second position. The two Auto Union cars finished the race in formation, fewer than three seconds apart as they crossed the line after more than three and a half hours of racing, a lap ahead of Dreyfus. This was Auto Union's first 1-2 finish, and would prove to be Momberger's best-ever result in Grand Prix competition.

Two weeks later, the Auto Union team were again out in force for the 1934 Italian Grand Prix. The race was held on a chicane-peppered ad hoc adaptation of the Monza Autodrome – designed to improve safety at the notoriously dangerous track – and the winning Mercedes of Rudolf Caracciola took almost five hours to complete the scheduled 116 laps, at an average speed of only just over 65 mph (105 km/h). Owing to its gruelling nature, both Momberger and team-leader Stuck had to call in their reserve substitutes for periods of the race. Sebastian stepped in for Momberger on lap 38, and the pair's car finished in seventh position, four laps down on the winner.

Unfortunately for Momberger, by this point in the season worsening arthritis prevented him from taking part in the 1934 Spanish Grand Prix in September, and Auto Union entered only two cars for Stuck and Leiningen, with Momberger attending as a reserve. The condition had not improved by the end of the month and Walb decided to formally replace Momberger with Sebastian for the next race, Auto Union's final entry of the season, in Brno.

The combined effects of his debilitating illness and a deteriorating relationship with team manager Walb persuaded Momberger to retire from competitive driving for good at the end of the 1934 season, and he moved sideways into the management of Auto Union.
