= Dudley Froy =

British racing driver (1904–1986)

- Born: 14 September 1904 Chelsea, London
- Died: 4 September 1986 (aged 81) Tucson, Arizona

Dudley Froy (14 September 1904 – 4 September 1986) was a British Grand Prix racing driver, who was also the first Briton to race in the NASCAR Grand National series.

== Career ==
=== European racing ===
Froy's involvement in motor racing started when he became a mechanic to Parry Thomas at his Brooklands workshops, and, after a win in his first race in a 50-mile handicap in an ancient Wolseley Moth in 1927, was recruited by Woolf Barnato and Captain A. G. Miller to drive their Bentleys.

He was a regular at Brooklands, including a number of appearances in the International 500 Miles Race (one of which was at the wheel of the Barnato-Hassan special), but never finished it. He was also involved in a number of record-breaking runs, including, in 1928, becoming the first man to average over 115mph for an hour (in a Bentley at Brooklands), and at Montlhéry in 1930 and 1931 setting a run of Class C records in a 4.5l Bentley, with Gwenda Stewart acting as co-driver in the latter.

In 1931 Froy entered the German Grand Prix in a 1.1 litre Riley Brooklands, in the "Group II" category for smaller cars; he drove the Riley from Coventry to the Nürburgring, won the category, and drove back again. He received an invitation to take part in the Indianapolis 500 as a consequence, but, lacking a suitable car, he declined.

It was his only serious racing foray abroad, until 1935, when he undertook a fuller season in voiturette racin in George Manby-Colgreave's Bugatti Type 54. His most prominent races came in the Avusrennen and Eifelrennen, finishing 7th in his heat (and not qualifying for the final) in the former, but retiring from the latter.

At the close of the year, he obtained a pilot's licence after only a week of tuition, and stepped back from racing, until 1946, when he took part in the Elstree speed trials in a Maserati 8C owned by John Wyer.

=== American racing ===
In 1947, he emigrated to Los Angeles to sell Lea-Francis engines; he soon moved to Arizona, first to Phoenix and then to Tucson, setting up racetracks in both places. He also took part in two NASCAR races in 1951, although a serious accident at Des Moines in August 1951, in which he broke his arm and dislocated his shoulder, saw him retire once more.

== Personal life ==
Froy married Betty Anne Murdock in Las Vegas in 1950; the couple had two daughters. He died of lung cancer in 1986.

== External websites ==
- NASCAR record
