= Ernst Burggaller =

German fighter pilot (1896-1940)

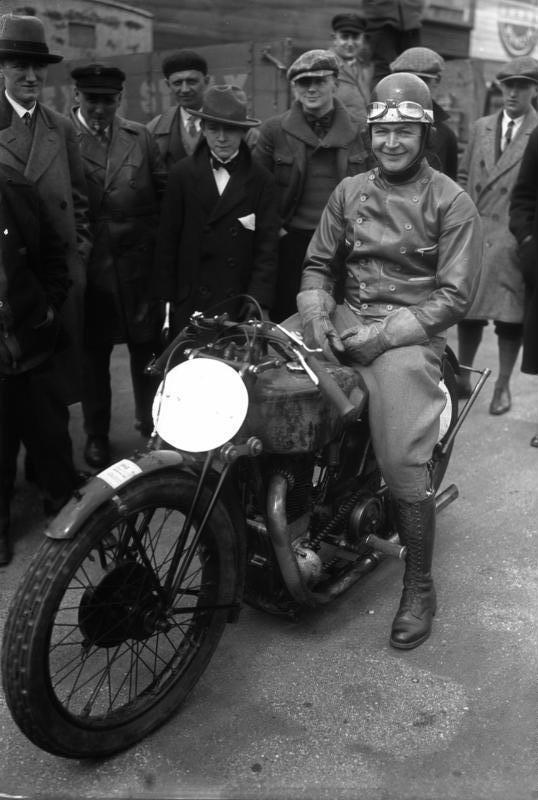
- On a Standard in 1925
- Born: Ernst Günther Burggaller; 21 March 1896 (age 130) Tillendorf, Prussia (now Poland)
- Died: 2 February 1940 (aged 43) Immenstaad am Bodensee, Bavaria

Ernst Günther Burggaller (21 March 1896 – 2 February 1940) was a German Grand Prix racing driver and fighter pilot.

== Racing career ==
The son of a pastor from Tillendorf, Burggaller served in the German Imperial Air Force during the First World War as a fighter pilot in Manfred von Richthofen's Flying Circus. After the war, Burggaller began racing motorcycles, and between 1925 and 1928 picked up 24 victories, including the 750cc category at the spring 1927 event at Avus on a BMW.

In 1928, Burggaller turned to four wheels, starting out with a Bugatti Type 37A (with which he also won his class at the 1929 German Grand Prix), trading up to a Bugatti Type 35 in 1930, and forming a team with Hermann zu Leiningen and Heinrich-Joachim von Morgen; in the 1930 German Mountain Championship, von Morgen took part in the racing car category and Burggaller in the sports, Burggaller finishing second to Rudolf Caracciola in his class.

Burggaller drove in a handful of Grand Prix events in the early thirties, making his debut at the 1930 Monaco Grand Prix, but never recorded a finish, other than a 2nd at the second-tier 1930 Czech Grand Prix. He had more success in voiturette racing; in 1933 he fitted a twin-cam engine from a Type 51A into the 35B chassis, and converted it to a single-seater as the regulations requiring two seats in racing changed, with which he gained his greatest success by winning the Czech Voiturette Grand Prix in September 1933.

Burggaller's last Grand Prix appearance came at the 1934 German Grand Prix, when Auto Union needed to replace an ill zu Leiningen and Burggaller won out in testing over Hans Simons and Rudolf Steinweg, but he struggled with the handling of the Type A. His starting car broke after 3 laps, and he was transferred into August Momberger's similar car on lap 20 after Momberger suffered a head injury, but that too gave out two laps later.

Burggaller retired from racing at the end of the season, opening a car dealership and running a farm.

== Death ==
In 1938, Burggaller returned to flying. He joined the Luftwaffe in the Second World War, and in October 1939 was made commander of the II Group of Jagdgeschwader 51. On 2 February 1940, Burggaller crashed his Messerschmitt Bf 109 E during a low-level flying exercise on Lake Constance, with fatal consequences. He was buried at the Waldfriehof cemetery next to his team-mates Bernd Rosemeyer and Ernst von Delius.

== Results ==
- Full results
