= 1929 Grand Prix season =

Interim year of the Grand Prix

Seasons
- ← 1928 1930 →

The 1929 Grand Prix season was another interim year, where most races were run to Formula Libre (open formula) rules due to a lack of regulations from the AIACR that would be popular for race organisers and manufacturers. This blurred the line between racing cars and sports cars with both competing in the same races. Bugatti won the major international races, with their drivers Louis Chiron and "W Williams". The Italian Championship proved very competitive, attracting many top drivers. There it was Alfa Romeo, using their 4-year old P2 model that claimed more victories, than their main competition coming from Bugatti and Maserati.

Chiron took a Delage across to Indianapolis but was outclassed by the Millers. Ray Keech won after duelling with the Millers of Lou Moore and Louis Meyer. Keech was killed a fortnight later at the AAA race at Altoona Speedway. Meyer went on to become the first back-to-back AAA champion.

The racing festival on the French Riviera held around Easter culminated in a new race – the Monaco Grand Prix. In a close race between Williams’ Bugatti and the Mercedes-Benz SSK sports car of Rudolf Caracciola, it was decided by a botched pit-stop for the German. The Targa Florio was another triumph for Bugatti, with Albert Divo claiming the fifth win in a row for the marque. Achille Varzi was the Italian Champion with victories at Alessandria, Rome, Montenero and Monza.

== Grand Épreuves ==
	Date	Name	Circuit	Race Regulations	Weather	Race Distance	Winner's Time	Winning driver	Winning constructor	Fastest lap	Report
5	30 May	(United States) XVII International 500 Mile; Sweepstakes	Indianapolis	AAA	?	500 miles	5h 07m	(United States) Ray Keech	Miller 91	not recorded	Report
7	30 Jun	(France) XXIII Grand Prix de l’ACF	Le Mans	AIACR	rain & sun	600 km	4h 33m	(United Kingdom) William Grover-Williams ("W. Williams")	Bugatti Type 35B	William Grover-Williams; Bugatti	Report
	7 Jul	(Belgium) Belgian Grand Prix	Spa-Francorchamps					cancelled			
	14 Jul	(Germany) IV Großer Preis von Deutschland	Nürburgring	sports	?	510 km	4h 46m	(Monaco) Louis Chiron	Bugatti Type 35B	Louis Chiron; Bugatti	Report
9	25 Jul	(Spain) VII Gran Premio de San Sebastián (Nation's Cup)	Lasarte	AIACR	rain & sun	690 km	5h 57m	(Monaco) Louis Chiron	Bugatti Type 35B	Louis Chiron; Bugatti	Report
	17 Aug	(United Kingdom) British Grand Prix	Brooklands					cancelled			
	8 Sep	(Italy) Italian Grand Prix / European Grand Prix	Monza					cancelled			

A pink background indicates the race was run for Sports Cars or Touring Cars this year, while a grey background indicates the race was not held this year. Sources:

== Major Races ==
Multiple classes are mentioned when they were divided and run to different race lengths.

	Date	Name	Circuit	Race Regulations	Weather	Race Distance	Winner's Time	Winning driver	Winning constructor	Report
	18 Mar	(Australia) II Australian Grand Prix	Phillip Island	Formula Libre handicap races	?	200 miles	3h 14m	(Australia) Arthur Terdich	Bugatti Type 37A	Report
	24 Mar	(Italian Libya) V Gran Premio di Tripoli	Tagiura	Formula Libre	overcast	420 km	3h 08m	(Italy) Conte Gastone Brilli-Peri	Talbot 700	Report
	1 Apr	(France) II Grand Prix d’Antibes Juan-les-Pins	La Garoupe	Formula Libre	sunny	310 km	4h 10m	(Switzerland) Mario Lepori	Bugatti Type 35B	Report
	7 Apr	(French Algeria) II I Grand Prix d’Algèrie	Staouéli	Formula Libre	sunny	360 km	3h 03m	(France) Marcel Lehoux	Bugatti Type 35C	Report
1	14 Apr	I Grand Prix de Monaco	Monte Carlo	Formula Libre	sunny	320 km	3h 56m	(United Kingdom) William Grover-Williams ("W. Williams")	Bugatti Type 35B	Report
2	21 Apr	(Italy) VI Circuito di Alessandria (Coppa Pietro Bordino)	Alessandria	Formula Libre	sunny	260 km	2h 21m	(Italy) Achille Varzi	Alfa Romeo P2	Report
3	5 May	(Italy) XX Targa Florio (Italy) XII Coppa Florio (Note: The Targa Florio and the Coppa Florio were run simultaneously over the same route.)	Medio Madonie	Targa Florio	sunny	540 km	7h 16m	(France) Albert Divo	Bugatti Type 35C	Report
	9 May	(France) II Coupe de Bourgogne	Dijon	Formula Libre; Cyclecar	rain	525 km 420 km	3h 48m	(France) Philippe de Rothschild (“Philippe”)	Bugatti Type 35C	Report
	19 May	(Belgium) IV Grand Prix des Frontières	Chimay	Formula Libre	?	220 km	h 58m	(Italy) Goffredo Zehender	Alfa Romeo 6C-1750	Report
4	26 May	(Italy) V Premio Reale di Roma	Tre Fontane	Formula Libre	cloudy	390 km	3h 03m	(Italy) Achille Varzi	Alfa Romeo P2	Report
	2 Jun	(Italy) IV Circuito del Pozzo	Verona	Formula Libre	hot	310 km	2h 13m	(Italy) Giovanni Alloatti	Bugatti Type 35B	Report
	2 Jun	(France) II Grand Prix Bugatti	Le Mans	Formula Libre handicap	?	?	?	(Chile) Juan Zanelli	Bugatti Type 35C	Report
6	9 Jun	(Italy) IX Circuito del Mugello (Targa Giulio Masetti)	Mugello	Formula Libre	sunny	370 km	5h 11m	(Italy) Conte Gastone Brilli-Peri	Talbot 700	Report
	9 Jun	(France) V Grand Prix de Picardie	Péronne	Voiturette	?	190 km	1h 47m	(France) Philippe Auber	Bugatti Type 37A	Report
	16 Jun	(France) I Grand Prix de Lyon	Quincieux	Formula Libre	?	250 km	2h 28m	(Germany) Hans Simons	Bugatti Type 35	Report
	23 Jun	(France) Grand Prix de Bordeaux de Cyclecars	Bordeaux	Cyclecar	?	75 km	1h 04m	(France) ? Hector David	Salmson	Report
	7 Jul	(France) V Grand Prix de la Marne	Reims-Gueux	Formula Libre	cloudy	400 km	2h 54m	(France) Philippe Étancelin	Bugatti Type 35C	Report
	7 Jul	(France) Prix de la Ville de Reims	Reims-Gueux	Cyclecar	?	120 km	56m	(France) Yves Giraud-Cabantous	Salmson	Report
	7 Jul	(France) Dieppe Grand Prix	Dieppe	Formula Libre	?	200 km	1h 47m	(France) René Dreyfus	Bugatti Type 35B	Report
	7 Jul	(Italy) II Coppa di Camaiore	Camaiore	Formula Libre	?	190 km	2h 35m	(Italy) Renato Balestrero	Bugatti Type 35C	Report
7	21 Jul	(Italy) III Coppa Ciano; VIII Coppa Montenero	Montenero	Formula Libre; Voiturette	hot	225 km	2h 35m	(Italy) Achille Varzi	Alfa Romeo P2	Report
8	28 Jul	(Spain) V Gran Premio de España	Lasarte	Sports	sunny	1374 km	12h	(France) Louis Rigal	Alfa Romeo P2	Report
	18 Aug	(France) V Grand Prix du Comminges	Saint-Gaudens	Formula Libre	?	390 km	2h 48m	(France) Philippe Étancelin	Bugatti Type 35C	Report
	22 Aug/ 2 Sep	(France) VI Grand Prix de la Baule	La Baule	Formula Libre	?	100 km	46m	(France) Philippe Étancelin	Bugatti Type 35C	Report
10	15 Sep	(Italy) II Gran Premio di Monza	Monza	Formula Libre, heats	hot	100 km	31m	(Italy) Achille Varzi	Alfa Romeo P2	Report
11	29 Sep	(Italy) IV Circuito di Cremona	Cremona	Formula Libre	cloudy	320 km	1h 47m	(Italy) Conte Gastone Brilli-Peri	Alfa Romeo P2	Report
12	17 Nov	(Tunisia) II I Grand Prix de Tunisie	Le Bardo	Formula Libre	sunny	320 km	2h 23m	(Italy) Conte Gastone Brilli-Peri	Alfa Romeo P2	Report

== Teams and drivers ==
These tables only intend to cover entries in the major races, as keyed above. Sources:

Entrant	Constructor	Chassis	Engine	Tyre	Driver	Rounds
(France) Usines Bugatti	Bugatti	Type 35C	Bugatti 2.0L S8 s/c		(France) Albert Divo	3, 4, 7
(France) Usines Bugatti	Bugatti	Type 35C	Bugatti 2.0L S8 s/c		(Italy) Conte Caberto Conelli	3, 7
(France) Usines Bugatti	Bugatti	Type 35C	Bugatti 2.0L S8 s/c		(Italy) Ferdinando Minoia	3
(France) Usines Bugatti	Bugatti	Type 35C	Bugatti 2.0L S8 s/c		(United Kingdom) William Grover-Williams	3*, [4], 7
(France) Usines Bugatti	Bugatti	Type 35C	Bugatti 2.0L S8 s/c		(France) Louis Wagner	3
(Italy) Officine Alfieri Maserati SpA	Maserati	Tipo V4; Tipo 26B; Tipo 26R; Tipo 26	Maserati 4.0L 2x8 twin s/c Maserati 2.0L S8 s/c Maserati 1.7L S8 s/c Maserati 1.5L S8 s/c		(Italy) Ernesto Maserati	2, 3, 4, 6, 8, 11, 12
(Italy) Officine Alfieri Maserati SpA	Maserati	Tipo V4; Tipo 26B; Tipo 26R; Tipo 26	Maserati 4.0L 2x8 twin s/c Maserati 2.0L S8 s/c Maserati 1.7L S8 s/c Maserati 1.5L S8 s/c		(Italy) Baconin Borzacchini	2, 3, 4, 6, 10, 11, 12
(Italy) Officine Alfieri Maserati SpA	Maserati	Tipo V4; Tipo 26B; Tipo 26R; Tipo 26	Maserati 4.0L 2x8 twin s/c Maserati 2.0L S8 s/c Maserati 1.7L S8 s/c Maserati 1.5L S8 s/c		(Italy) Luigi Fagioli	2, 4, [8]
(Italy) Officine Alfieri Maserati SpA	Maserati	Tipo V4; Tipo 26B; Tipo 26R; Tipo 26	Maserati 4.0L 2x8 twin s/c Maserati 2.0L S8 s/c Maserati 1.7L S8 s/c Maserati 1.5L S8 s/c		(Italy) Alfieri Maserati	6*, 10
(Italy) Alfa Corse	Alfa Romeo	Alfa Romeo 6C-1750 SS; Alfa Romeo 6C-1750 GS; Alfa Romeo P2	Alfa Romeo 1.75L S6 s/c Alfa Romeo 1.75L S6 s/c Alfa Romeo 2.0L S8 s/c		(Italy) Conte Gastone Brilli-Peri	3, 4, 8, 10, 11, 12
(Italy) Alfa Corse	Alfa Romeo	Alfa Romeo 6C-1750 SS; Alfa Romeo 6C-1750 GS; Alfa Romeo P2	Alfa Romeo 1.75L S6 s/c Alfa Romeo 1.75L S6 s/c Alfa Romeo 2.0L S8 s/c		(Italy) Achille Varzi	3, 4, 8, 10, 11, 12
(Italy) Alfa Corse	Alfa Romeo	Alfa Romeo 6C-1750 SS; Alfa Romeo 6C-1750 GS; Alfa Romeo P2	Alfa Romeo 1.75L S6 s/c Alfa Romeo 1.75L S6 s/c Alfa Romeo 2.0L S8 s/c		(Italy) Giuseppe Campari	3, 8
(Italy) Alfa Corse	Alfa Romeo	Alfa Romeo 6C-1750 SS; Alfa Romeo 6C-1750 GS; Alfa Romeo P2	Alfa Romeo 1.75L S6 s/c Alfa Romeo 1.75L S6 s/c Alfa Romeo 2.0L S8 s/c		(Italy) Tazio Nuvolari	8
(Germany) Daimler-Benz AG	Mercedes-Benz	Mercedes-Benz SSK; Mercedes-Benz 1921	Mercedes-Benz 7.1L S6 s/c Mercedes-Benz 4.5L S4 s/c		(Germany) Rudolf Caracciola	1, [9]
(Germany) Daimler-Benz AG	Mercedes-Benz	Mercedes-Benz SSK; Mercedes-Benz 1921	Mercedes-Benz 7.1L S6 s/c Mercedes-Benz 4.5L S4 s/c		(Germany) August Momberger	10
(Germany) Daimler-Benz AG	Mercedes-Benz	Mercedes-Benz SSK; Mercedes-Benz 1921	Mercedes-Benz 7.1L S6 s/c Mercedes-Benz 4.5L S4 s/c		(Germany) Adolf Rosenberger	10
(Italy) Officine Meccaniche	O.M.	665 SMM	O.M. 2.0L S 6		(Italy) Archimede Rosa	[3], 6, 8
(Italy) Officine Meccaniche	O.M.	665 SMM	O.M. 2.0L S 6		(Italy) Giuseppe Morandi	[3], 6, 8
(France) SA des Autos et Cycles Peugeot	Peugeot	174 S	Peugeot 4.0L S 4		(France) André Boillot	7
(France) SA des Autos et Cycles Peugeot	Peugeot	174 S	Peugeot 4.0L S 4		(France) Guy Bouriat	7
(United States) Duesenberg Bros	Duesenberg	Type 91	Duesenberg 1.5L S8 s/c	F	(United States) Jimmy Gleason	5
(United States) Duesenberg Bros	Duesenberg	Type 91	Duesenberg 1.5L S8 s/c	F	(United States) Bill Spence †	5
(United States) Duesenberg Bros	Duesenberg	Type 91	Duesenberg 1.5L S8 s/c	F	(United States) Freddie Winnai	5
(United States) Duesenberg Bros	Duesenberg	Type 91	Duesenberg 1.5L S8 s/c	F	(United States) Lora L. Corum	5*
(United States) Duesenberg Bros	Duesenberg	Type 91	Duesenberg 1.5L S8 s/c	F	(United States) Roscoe Ford	5*
(United States) Duesenberg Bros	Duesenberg	Type 91	Duesenberg 1.5L S8 s/c	F	(United States) Thane Houser	5*
(United States) Duesenberg Bros	Duesenberg	Type 91	Duesenberg 1.5L S8 s/c	F	(United States) Ernie Triplett	5*
(United States) Cooper Engineering; Marmon Motor Car Company	Cooper-Miller	Type 91 FD	Miller 1.5L S8 s/c Miller 1.5L S8 s/c		(United States) Russ Snowberger	5
(United States) Cooper Engineering; Marmon Motor Car Company	Cooper-Miller	Type 91 FD	Miller 1.5L S8 s/c Miller 1.5L S8 s/c		(United States) Fred Frame	5
(United States) Cooper Engineering; Marmon Motor Car Company	Cooper-Miller	Type 91 FD	Miller 1.5L S8 s/c Miller 1.5L S8 s/c		(United States) Johnny Seymour	5
(Italy) Scuderia Materassi	Talbot Bugatti	700 GPLB; Type 37A	Talbot 1.5L S8 s/c Bugatti 1.5L S4 s/c		(Italy) Conte Gastone Brilli-Peri	2, 6
(Italy) Scuderia Materassi	Talbot Bugatti	700 GPLB; Type 37A	Talbot 1.5L S8 s/c Bugatti 1.5L S4 s/c		(Italy) Luigi Arcangeli	2, 4, 8, 10, 11
(Italy) Scuderia Materassi	Talbot Bugatti	700 GPLB; Type 37A	Talbot 1.5L S8 s/c Bugatti 1.5L S4 s/c		(Italy) Carlo Maria Pintacuda	4
(Italy) Scuderia Materassi	Talbot Bugatti	700 GPLB; Type 37A	Talbot 1.5L S8 s/c Bugatti 1.5L S4 s/c		(Italy) Tazio Nuvolari	10, 11
(Italy) Scuderia Nuvolari	Bugatti Alfa Romeo	Type 35C; 6C-1750 SS	Bugatti 2.0L S8 s/c Alfa Romeo 1.75L S6 s/c		(Italy) Tazio Nuvolari	[ 2], 4, 6
(United States) Bill White Race Cars	Duesenberg	Type 91	Miller 1.5L S8 s/c		(United States) Babe Stapp	5
(United States) Boyle Valve	Miller	Type 91 FD	Miller 1.5L S8 s/c		(United States) Cliff Woodbury	5
(United States) Boyle Valve	Miller	Type 91 FD	Miller 1.5L S8 s/c		(United States) Pete DePaolo	5
(United States) Boyle Valve	Miller	Type 91 FD	Miller 1.5L S8 s/c		(United States) Billy Arnold	5
(United States) Boyle Valve	Miller	Type 91 FD	Miller 1.5L S8 s/c		(United States) Red Robert	5*
(United States) Packard Cable	Miller	Type 91 FD	Miller 1.5L S8 s/c		(United States) “Leon Duray”	5, 10
(United States) Packard Cable	Miller	Type 91 FD	Miller 1.5L S8 s/c		(United States) Ralph Hepburn	5
(United States) Packard Cable	Miller	Type 91 FD	Miller 1.5L S8 s/c		(United States) Tony Gulotta	5
(United States) Packard Cable	Miller	Type 91 FD	Miller 1.5L S8 s/c		(France) Edmond Bourlier	[10]
(United States) M. A. Yagle	Miller	Type 91	Miller 1.5L S8 s/c	F	(United States) Ray Keech †	5
(United States) Reed & Mulligan	Miller	Type 91	Miller 1.5L S8 s/c		(United States) Bert Karnatz	5
(United States) Reed & Mulligan	Miller	Type 91	Miller 1.5L S8 s/c		(Switzerland) / (United States) Herman Schurch	5
(United States) Reed & Mulligan	Miller	Type 91	Miller 1.5L S8 s/c		(United States) Jack Buxton	5*
(United States) Thompson Products	Amilcar		Amilcar 1.5L		(France) Jules Moriceau	5
(United States) Tommy Milton	Detroit	Type 91	Miller 1.5L S8 s/c		(United States) Pete Kreis	5

=== Significant Privateer drivers ===
Entrant	Constructor	Chassis	Engine	Driver	Rounds
Private Entrant	Bugatti	Type 35C; Type 35B	Bugatti 2.0L S8 s/c Bugatti 2.3L S8 s/c	(Romania) / (Belgium) Georges Bouriano	[2], 3, 4, 6, 8, 10, 11
Private Entrant	Salmson Bugatti Bugatti	. Type 37A; Type 35C	Salmson 1.1L; Bugatti 1.5L S4 s/c Bugatti 2.0L S8 s/c	(Italy) Clemente Biondetti	1, [2], 4, 6, 9
Private Entrant	Bugatti	Type 37A; Type 35B	Bugatti 1.5L S4 s/c Bugatti 2.3L S8 s/c	(France) René Dreyfus	1, 9, 12
Private Entrant	Bugatti	Type 35A; Type 35B	Bugatti 2.0L S8 s/c Bugatti 2.3L S8 s/c	(France) Philippe Étancelin	1, 9, 12
Private Entrant	Alfa Romeo	6C-1500; 6C-1750 GS	Alfa Romeo 1.5L S6 s/c Alfa Romeo 1.75L S6 s/c	(Italy) Pietro Ghersi	[1], 2, 8
Private Entrant	Bugatti	Type 37A; Type 35B	Bugatti 1.5L S4 s/c Bugatti 2.3L S8 s/c	(France) Marcel Lehoux	1, 9, 12
Private Entrant	Bugatti	Type 35C; Type 44; Type 35B	Bugatti 2.0L S8 s/c Bugatti 3.0L S8; Bugatti 2.3L S8 s/c	(France) Philippe de Rothschild (“Philippe”)	1, 7, 9
Private Entrant	Maserati	Tipo 26B	Maserati 2.0L S8 s/c	(Italy) Cleto Nenzioni	2, 4, 6, 10, [11]
Private Entrant	Bugatti	Type 35B; Type 37A	Bugatti 2.3L S8 s/c Bugatti 1.5L S4 s/c	(Chile) Juan Zanelli	2, [6], 9, 10
Private Entrant	Bugatti	Type 35B; Type 35C	Bugatti 2.3L S8 s/c Bugatti 2.0L S8 s/c	(Italy) Giulio Foresti	3, 4, 9, 10, [11]
Private Entrant	Miller	Type 91 FD	Miller 1.5L S8 s/c	(United States) Cliff Bergere	5
Private Entrant	Bugatti	Type 35C	Bugatti 2.0L S8 s/c	(Monaco) Louis Chiron	5, 9, [11]
Private Entrant	Miller	Type 91	Miller 1.5L S8 s/c	(United States) Louis Meyer	5
Private Entrant	Bugatti	Type 35B	Bugatti 2.3L S8 s/c	(France) Robert Sénéchal	7

Note: * raced in event as a relief driver. Those in brackets show, although entered, the driver did not race
Note: † driver killed during this racing season

== Regulations and Technical ==
The AIACR recognised the tight economic times were limiting manufacturer involvement in the sport. Having opened up to Formula Libre engine regulations (with only a minimum 1.1-litre capacity) in the last season, for this year the minimum weight was lifted to 900 kg. The Grands Prix were still to be at least 600 km long, but now a consumption limitation was added where no more than 14.5 kg per 100 km (14.5 mpg) of petrol could be consumed. The fuel had to be carried in an external fuel-tank with a visible fuel gauge. A new dispensation was added, now allowing two mechanics to assist the driver during pit-stops. Nominally set up for seven races in seven countries, the planned World Championship was abandoned when most organisations disavowed the AIACR regulations. In fact, only the French and Spanish races met the requirements.

With racing in France in a malaise and Britain limited to Brooklands, the focus for grand-prix racing moved to the Mediterranean – particularly Italy, but also Spain, the French Riviera and northern Africa. One of the latest additions would gain great fame as an icon race: the brainchild of Antony Noghès, the 3 km Monaco circuit ran through the streets of Monte Carlo, from the port up to the famous hotel and casino then back, via a tunnel, along the waterfront. Safety measures included painting the kerbstones white to help the drivers judge their cornering.

The Targa Florio regulations were simplified to two classes: over and under 1100cc. The Coppa Florio was again run on the same course and to the same length as the Targa, however, only opened for the over-1100cc class.

In America, the AAA meanwhile stuck with the tried-and-tested 1.5-litre formula for their single-seaters for one more season. But they announced that regulation changes would come for the next season. Belgium, Germany and Great Britain deferred their premier national races to sports-car events instead.

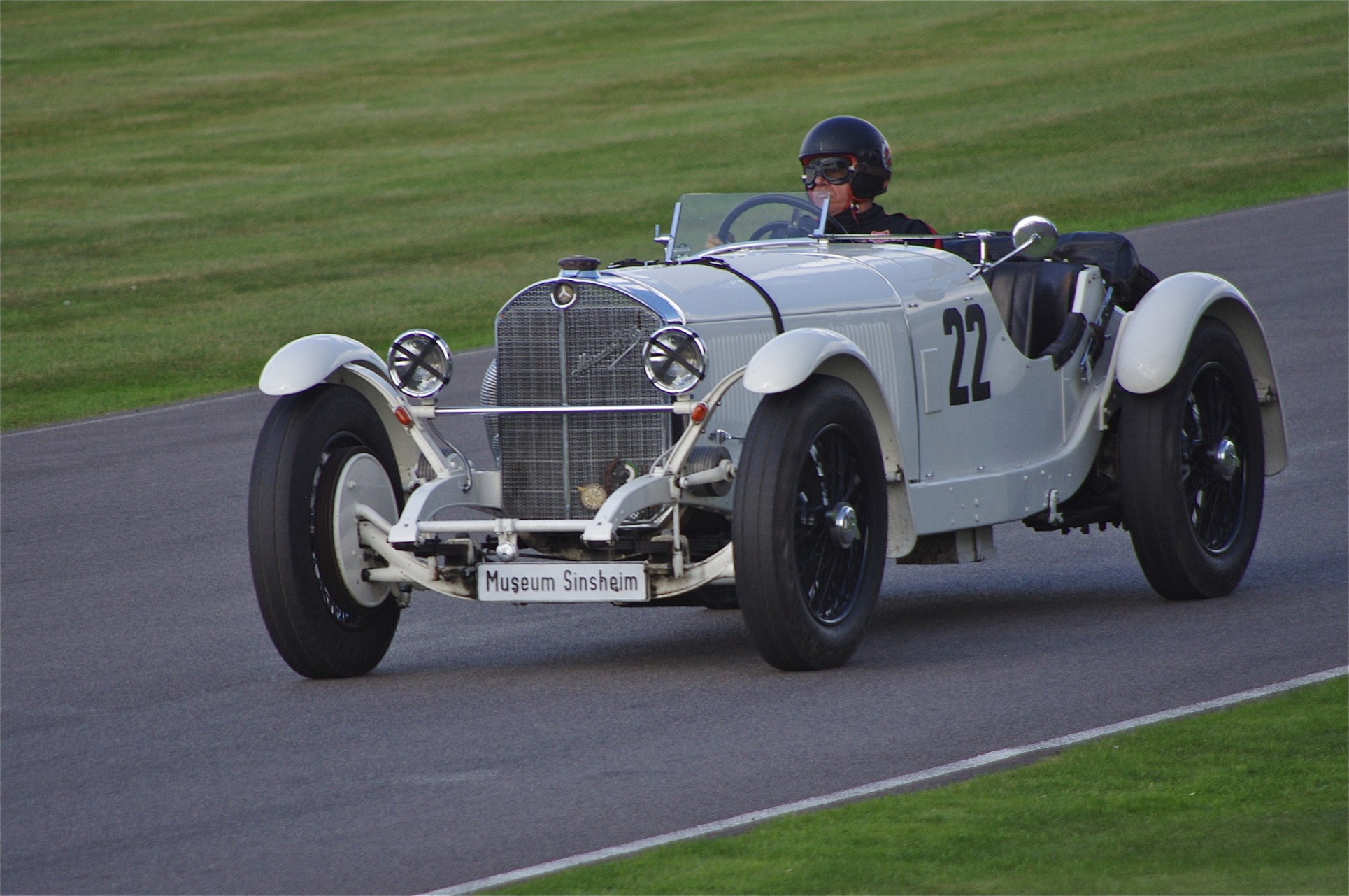
Mercedes-Benz SSK

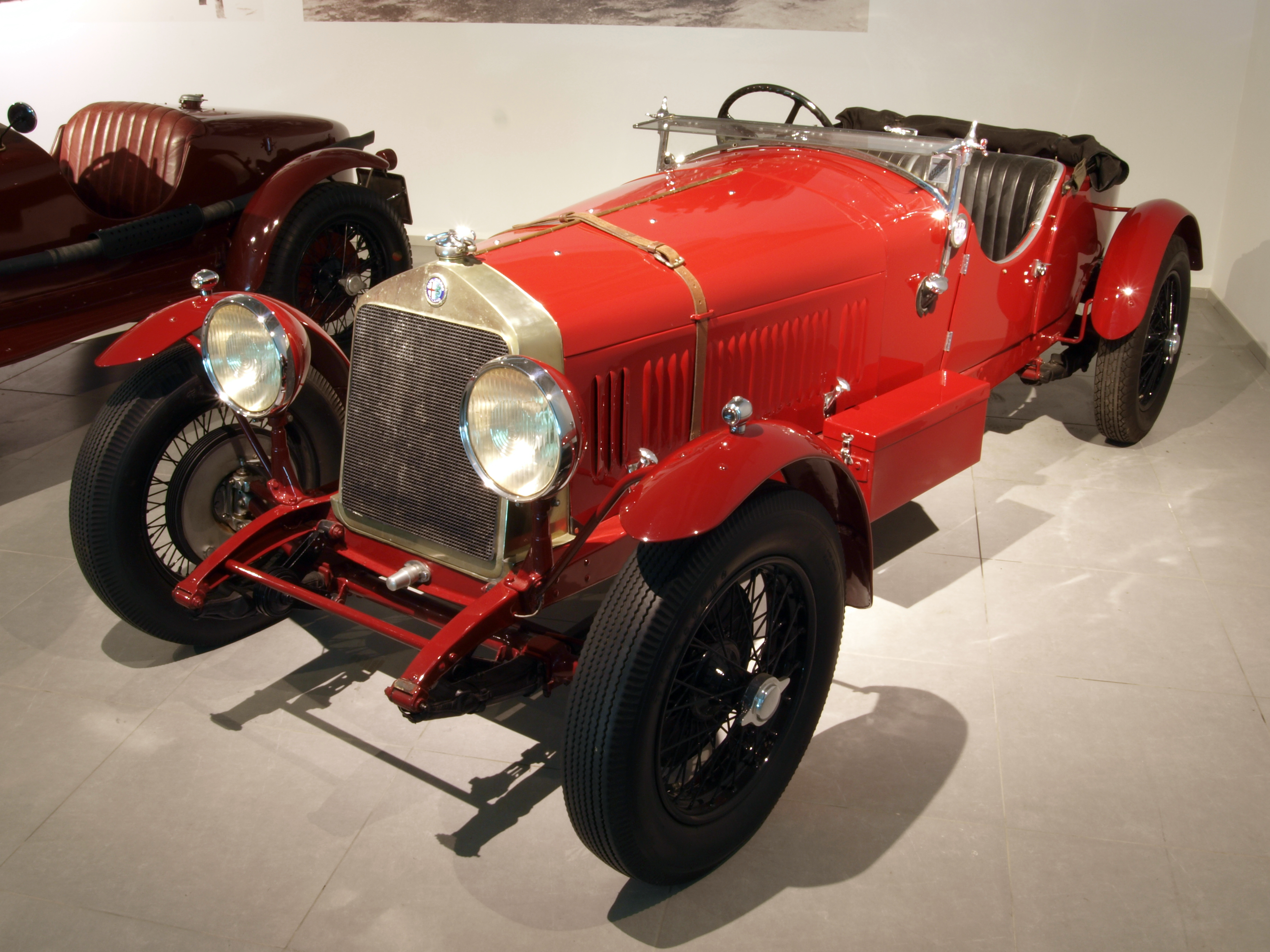
Alfa Romeo 6C-1500

=== Technical Innovation ===
The open formula restarted the trend toward bigger engines as the simplest way to gain more power and speed. Maserati came up with one of the most unusual designs of the period with their new Tipo V4 model. It essentially combined two 2-litre engines from their 26B, running on a common crankcase with two crankshafts and twin Roots superchargers. They also produced their first 1100cc car, the Tipo 26C.

Manufacturer	Model	Engine	Power Output	Max. Speed (km/h)	Dry Weight (kg)
(France) Bugatti	Type 35B	Bugatti 2.3L S8 supercharged	140 bhp	210	710
(France) Bugatti	Type 35C	Bugatti 2.0L S8 supercharged			
(France) Bugatti	Type 37A	Bugatti 1496cc S4 supercharged	90 bhp	180	720
(Italy) Maserati	Maserati Tipo V4	Maserati 4.0L twin-8 supercharged	300 bhp	255	1050
(Italy) Maserati	Tipo 26B	Maserati 2.0L S8 supercharged			
(Italy) Alfa Romeo	P2	Alfa Romeo 2.0L S8 supercharged	155 bhp	240	750
(Italy) Alfa Romeo	6C-1750 SS	Alfa Romeo 1752cc S6	65 bhp	130	
(France) / (United Kingdom) Talbot	700 GPLB	Talbot 1489cc S4 supercharged	140 bhp	210	700
(Germany) Mercedes-Benz	Mercedes-Benz SSK	Mercedes-Benz 7.1L S6 part-supercharged	225 bhp		

== Season review ==
=== Opening races ===
After the death of Emilio Materassi, his friend Gastone Brilli-Peri took up the running of his racing team, the Scuderia Materassi, with Luigi Arcangeli. He won the season opener at Tunis, beating home Baconin Borzacchini in the works Maserati and Tazio Nuvolari, now building his own racing team. Across the Mediterranean, on the Côte d’Azur, a series of meetings in April attracted a number of top and up-and-coming drivers. Italian interest in these essentially French affairs brought drivers with their Alfa Romeos and Maseratis making up diverse fields rather than just being a Bugatti procession. At Antibes, Swiss regular Mario Lepori lapped the field for a comfortable win. A week later, Edward Bret then won the sprint races at Cannes. The series culminated at a new race held around the streets of Monte Carlo. After 100 laps, the winner would receive a golden trophy and FF100000. The organisers sent invitations to twenty drivers, a dozen of whom had raced at Antibes. These included the Bugattis of Lepori, Philippe Étancelin and Philippe de Rothschild joined by Marcel Lehoux and William Grover-Williams (racing under his pseudonym of “Williams”). Goffredo Zehender, Pietro Ghersi and Louis Rigal led the Alfa Romeo challenge while German Rudolf Caracciola arrived in his 7-litre Mercedes-Benz SSK sports car. A surprise absentee was Monaco-resident Louis Chiron who was instead going to America for the Indianapolis 500.

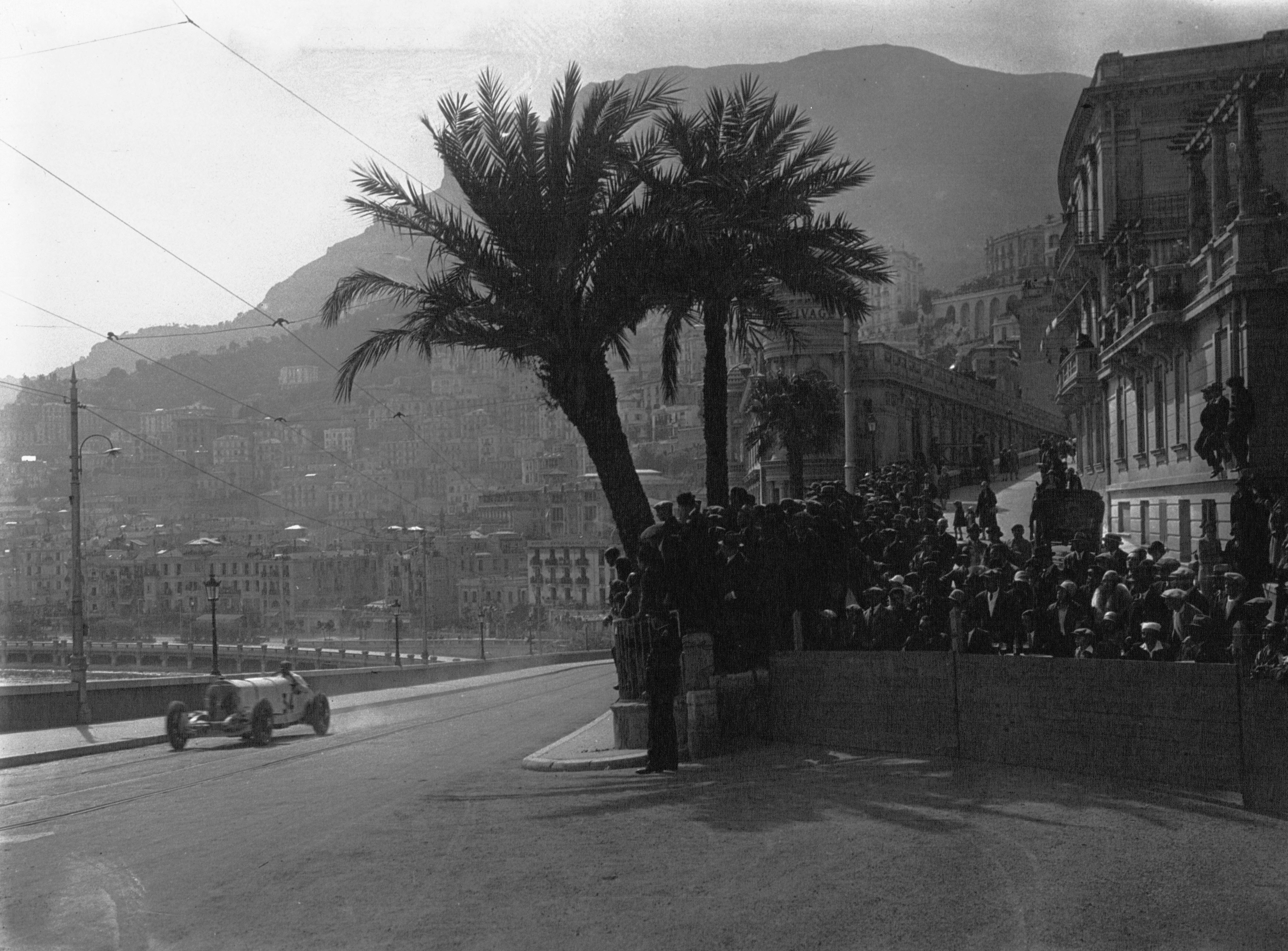
Caracciola's Mercedes at the Monaco GP

After a wet practice, race day was sunny and a huge crowd thronged the circuit and watching from hotel balconies. The starting grid was decided by lot and although Lehoux took the lead from the flag it was Williams who led at the end of the first lap. Caracciola, starting from the fifth row, had already muscled his way up to second by the second lap. Coming out of the tunnel on the waterfront, Lehoux crashed his Bugatti wrecking three wheels. He ran back to the pits, retrieved three more and after changing them resumed the race 11 laps down. Williams, Caracciola and Bouriano gradually pulled away from the field. On the thirtieth lap the German passed Williams to take the lead, but the Briton fought back and repassed him six laps later. At the halfway point, with only 9 of the 16 starters still running, the top three made their pit-stops. Caracciola had a farcical pitstop when the jack slipped off the tramline it was resting on and dropped the car, then the hammer used to knock the wheel off broke. This all cost him an extra three minutes (and a lap) to the two Bugattis. Thereafter Williams was able to keep up a quick, but measured, pace and secure a comfortable victory over Bouriano with Caracciola coming home third. Later in the year, Caracciola took his car to Northern Ireland and, in the rain in front of over 500,000 spectators, won the RAC Tourist Trophy from a field of 65 starters.

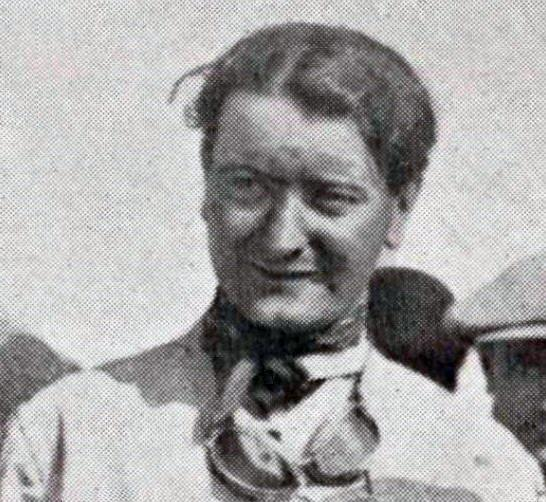
William Grover-Williams, winner of the inaugural Monaco GP

The Mille Miglia sports car race had been held the same weekend, won by Giuseppe Campari for Alfa Romeo. A week later a big field of 33 cars lined up for the race at Alessandria, now known as the Coppa Pietro Bordino after the death the year before of the great Italian driver. The two main Italian teams arrived: Borzacchini, Ernesto Maserati and Luigi Fagioli for Maserati and Brilli-Peri and Arcangeli in the Talbots of the Scuderia Materassi. Alongside them were Varzi, Ghersi and Enzo Ferrari in their Alfa Romeos, while Nuvolari would not start after an accident in practice. From a standing start, Varzi bolted to the lead with the fastest lap of the race. Despite the dusty conditions on the public roads, he easily dominated the race and led all the way. Brilli-Peri was second for much of the race until his gearbox seized with only two kilometres to go; but he pushed his Talbot for twenty minutes to cross the line. This lifted Borzacchini and Maserati to second and third, nearly five minutes behind Varzi.

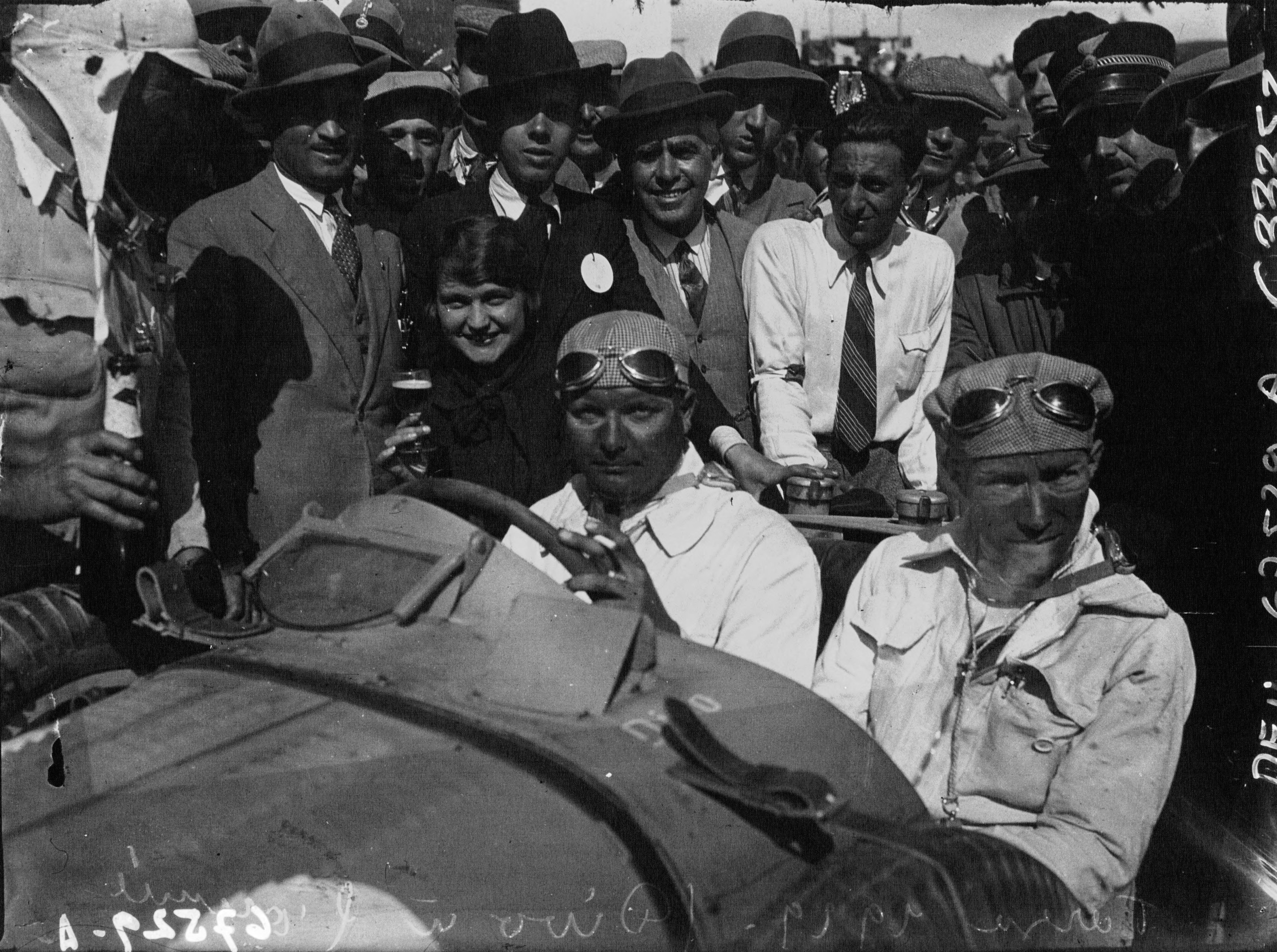
Albert Divo, winner of the Targa Florio for Bugatti

A promising field of 29 entrants for the 20th Targa Florio eventuated to become 19 starters. Bugatti had dominated the race with victories in the past four years and the company entered a strong team of four drivers all in the 2-litre Type 35C: race-winner Albert Divo, Louis Wagner, Ferdinando Minoia and Caberto Conelli. Williams was named as a reserve driver. Alfa Romeo also sent a works team with the new 1750cc Super Sport version of the 6C tourer. Team drivers were Varzi, Brilli-Peri and Campari. Borzacchini and Ernesto were once again running the works Maseratis, while Lepori led a troop of privateer Bugattis. Following the example set the year before, by Eliška Junková, of meticulous preparation, both the Bugatti and Alfa Romeo teams arrived during the month beforehand for extensive practice. The French team based itself up in the mountains at Polizzi. The staggered start commenced at 8am with Campari leading the field away at 3-minute intervals. Minoia set a new lap record on his first lap, with Borzacchini only four seconds behind him on elapsed time, with Brilli-Peri, Divo and Varzi further back. Minoia continued setting the pace until he slowed with steering issues on the fourth lap. This put Divo into the lead and he held on to take back-to-back victories. Borzacchini had been closing quickly on Minoia on the last lap but was stopped with suspension problems just two miles from the finish. Campari was fourth, the last classified finisher. For Bugatti it was an unprecedented fifth Targa win in a row, and third consecutive Coppa Florio victory thereby winning the trophy outright. That thereafter proved to be the final time the Coppa was run in that format. It would be resumed and re-imagined in 1974, run at Pergusa.

Three weeks later, the competition resumed at the Rome Grand Prix with a number of the same drivers. Divo and Williams raced for Bugatti, Brilli-Peri and Varzi for Alfa Romeo and Maserati, Borzacchini and Luigi Fagioli for Maserati. Arcangeli and Carlo Pintacuda drove the Talbots of Scuderia Meterassi while Nuvolari had his Bugatti. There were also Hans Stuck in a 3-litre Austro-Daimler, and August Momberger and Fritz Caflisch in their big Mercedes-Benz tourers. From pole position, Stuck jumped into the lead. The dust thrown up by the cars was so bad much of the grid had to come to a stop from lack of visibility. Stuck led for two laps until his engine lost power. Varzi and Brilli-Peri passed him and within three laps had lapped the field. As other drivers had their problems, the two Alfas kept their lead and when Varzi stopped to refuel at half distance, Brilli-Peri took over. He finally came in for his stop with only two of the thirty laps to go. Despite only a thirty-second pitstop, he emerged just behind his teammate. Varzi pulled away to win by 45 seconds, with Divo's Bugatti finishing over ten minutes back in third.

=== Indianapolis ===
Once again the Indianapolis 500 was dominated by the supercharged Miller engines, powering over 80% of the starters. Defending champion Louis Meyer, Cliff Bergere and Lou Moore ran Millers. Former winner Pete DePaolo, Cliff Woodbury and Billy Arnold were in the Boyle Valve team Millers. George Stewart (racing under his pseudonym “Leon Duray”), with his team sponsored by Packard Cable, had Ralph Hepburn and Tony Gulotta alongside him. Up against them were only four Duesenbergs, with three of them (Jimmy Gleason, Freddie Winnai and Bill Spence) run by the works team. Earl Cooper had three of his front-wheel drive cars with Miller engines, with Russ Snowberger leading the team. Additional interest was generated with the entry of two French cars: Grand prix winner Louis Chiron ran a 1.5-litre supercharged Delage while Jules Moriceau had an Amilcar.

Once again, the front-wheel drive Millers proved very fast in practice, taking four of the top-five spots in qualifying with Cliff Woodbury claiming pole position and Leon Duray and Ralph Hepburn joining him on the front row. From the start Duray took the lead. On the fourth lap, Woodbury's right rear wheel broke spinning him round and sending him backward into the wall. Woodbury was uninjured and was able to get back to the pits to act as a relief driver later in the race. On the eighth lap Deacon Litz, running third, found his handbrake broken. Diving to the infield to avoid hitting the leaders, he regained control and instead was able to overtake them to go into the lead. On the tenth lap Bill Spence hit the wall hard at turn two. The car rolled several times, throwing Spence out. He was taken to hospital with a fractured skull but died en route. His was the first fatal accident in the race for ten years. Litz held the lead until lap 56 when, in his words, “something the size of a brick” exploded out the side of his engine. This moved Moore up into the lead followed by Meyer, Duray, Keech and Arnold. But after Duray's car (driven by Hepburn) retired with engine problems, at one-third distance seven of the top ten qualifiers had retired. Moore and Meyer swapped the lead until lap 93, when Moore pitted and was relieved by Barney Kleopfer. Meyer, Keech and Kleopfer stayed in close contact through the second half of the race. Meyer came in from the lead for his final stop on lap 157 but the car stalled. Once he had finally got going again he had slipped to third, four laps down. With ten laps to go, Kloepfer's car started running rough and losing oil. He pitted with just two laps, Moore got back in to nurse it to the finish but only made it to turn two before being stopped with a broken connecting rod. Keech cruised on to a comfortable victory, with Meyer taking second place six minutes behind, while Jimmy Gleason came home in third for Duesenberg twelve minutes (8 laps) later. Chiron lasted the distance but finished over half an hour behind Keech in 7th.

The first two cars has both formerly been raced by Frank Lockhart, who had died in 1928. Keech's Miller was now owned by Maude Yagle, to date the only female team-owner to win the race. Sadly, he would not be able to savour his new fame and celebrity, as he died just a fortnight later at the Altoona Speedway, the last of the board-tracks. He was killed instantly when his car hit track debris, rolled and burst into flames. Louis Meyer was one of only two drivers to compete in all five events of the 1929 AAA series. With two wins and four top-5 finishes, his consistency made him the AAA's first back-to-back champion.

=== June to August ===
Bugattis were definitely in the minority at the Circuito del Mugello. Ten Alfa Romeo 6Cs started, including Varzi, Campari, Ferrari and Nuvolari (swapping out his Bugatti). They took on five Maseratis (including the works team) and five Bugattis. The OM works team was present with cars for Archimede Rosa and Giuseppe Morandi. Brilli-Peri was the sole representative of the Scuderia Materassi but on the long straights, his Talbot was powerful enough to take a flag-to-flag victory. Stuck had been challenging hard in his Austro-Daimler until he crashed spectacularly. Unsighted by dust his car hit the post of a narrow bridge. Thrown out of the car, he landed below on the stones of a dry river bed, fortunately only suffering mild back injuries. Morandi and his OM finished second, over eight minutes behind the Talbot. First Alfa home, in third, was the unheralded Enrico Benini, driving reliably and consistently.

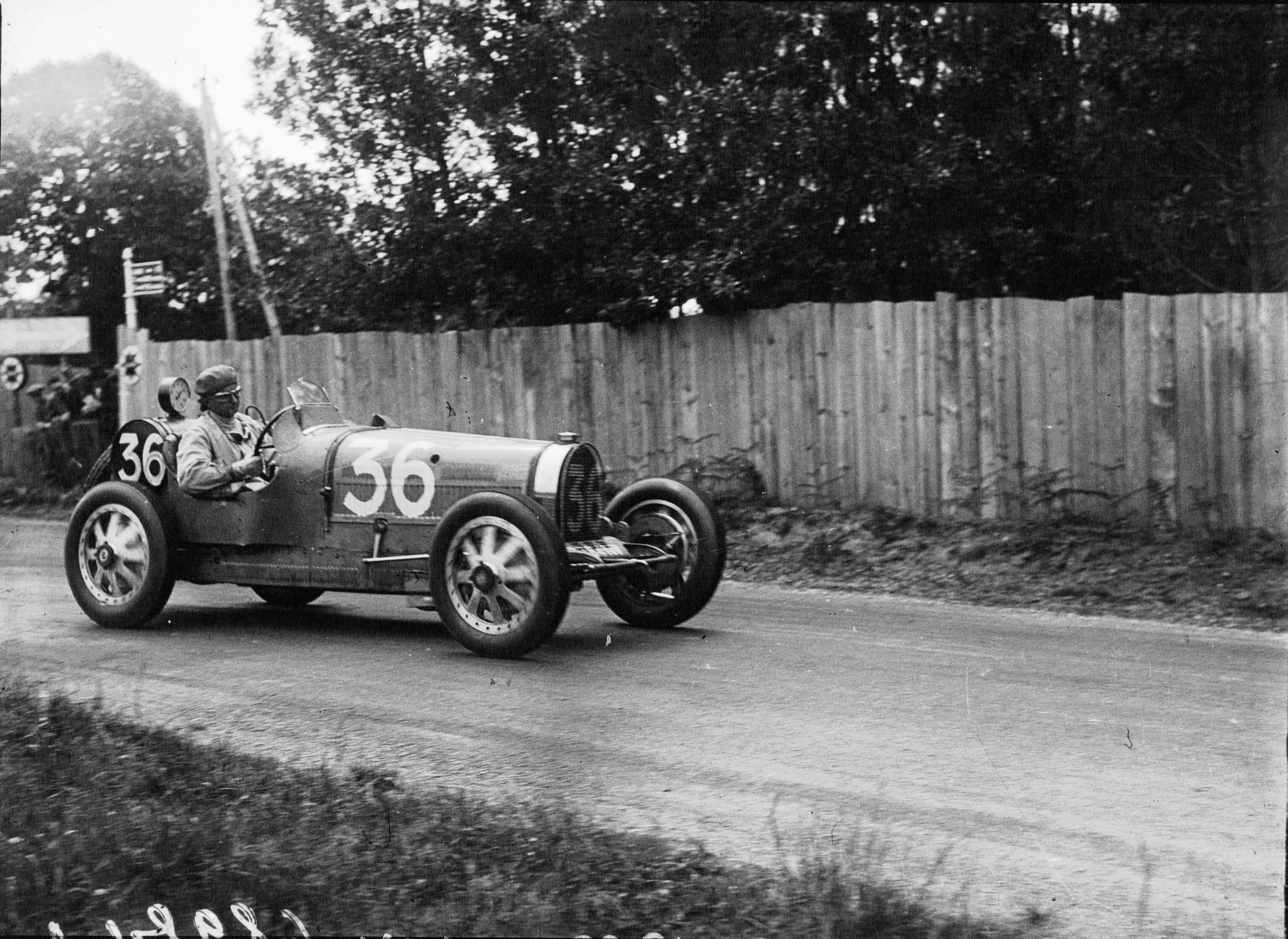
William's Bugatti at the French GP

Bugatti made a stronger effort for their home Grand Prix in France. In the works cars, Divo, Williams and Conelli had the 2.3-litre Type 35B. They were against two works Peugeot 174 4-litre sports cars driven by André Boillot and Guy Bouriat. Robert Sénéchal was the best of four Bugatti privateers and there were also two old Ballots rounding out the field of eleven. The race was 37 laps of the current Le Mans circuit, and it was one of only two races run on the AIACR fuel-economy formula. On the Saturday, the cars were filled with a precisely weighed amount of petrol, and the tanks sealed overnight. The next day the cars were lined up diagonally and started together. Boillot led at the end of the first lap, however his Peugeot teammate was stranded out on the circuit with a faulty magneto and it would take him an hour to get back to the pits. Boillot was hounded by the Bugattis, with Williams, Conelli, Sénéchal and Divo making up the top five. Williams caught and passed the Peugeot on the sixth lap, setting the fastest lap of the race in the process. The two continued to swap the lead until Boillot had to pit on lap 12 to fix a loose ignition wire, losing ground. At the halfway point, Williams had a 2-minute lead over Boillot and Conelli, with Divo now in fourth a further two minutes back. The second half of the race was more routine with scattered light showers dropping race speeds and limiting competitive driving. Williams won by a minute, while Boillot held on to second from a fast-finishing Conelli only eight seconds behind.

The Coppa Ciano was northern Italy's equivalent to the Targa Florio, run on the mountainous Montenero circuit near Livorno. As the next round of the Italian Championship, most of the major drivers were entered. Nuvolari and Brilli-Peri were brought into the Alfa Corse works team, leaving Arcangeli to run the Materassi Talbot. Given some of the narrowness of the road, cars were flagged off at 30-second intervals for the 10-lap race, led by the voiturettes. Although Maserati was the first over-1100cc car to arrive, it was Varzi who narrowly led from Brilli-Peri on elapsed time. Their duel continued, with the lead swapping back and forth with only seconds between them. Nuvolari was thirty seconds back in third just ahead of Biondetti's Bugatti. Varzi kept pressing building a lead and the race was decided on the eighth lap when Brilli-Peri had to pit and lost two places. This left Varzi to ease off and take the win, with Nuvolari and Campari giving Alfa Romeo a 1-2-3 result.

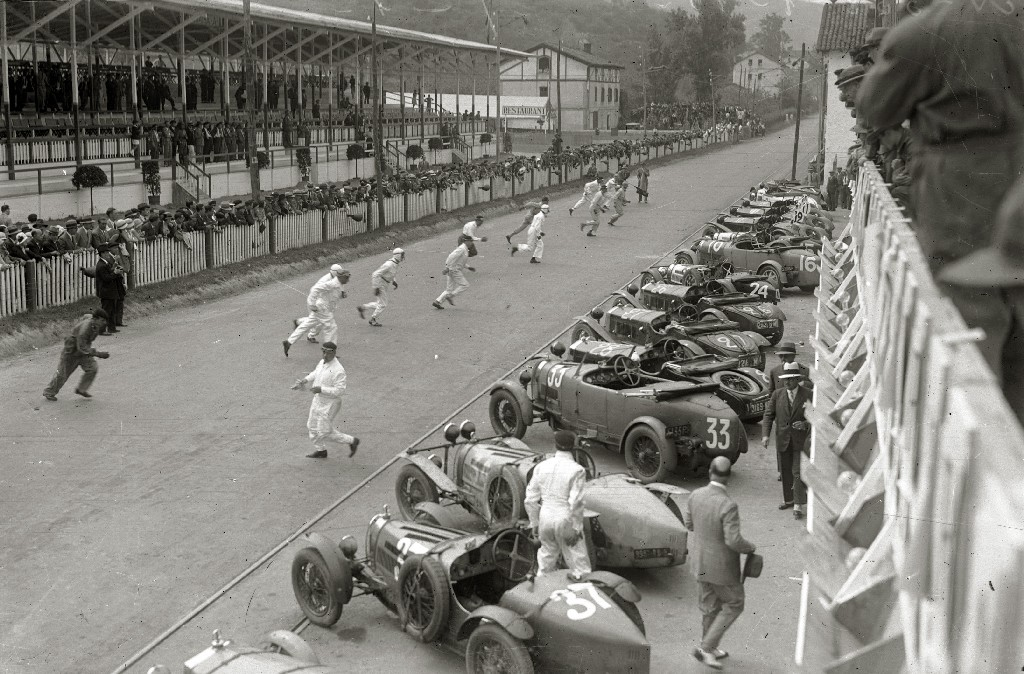
Start of the Spanish GP

In Spain, the field for the San Sebastián Grand Prix was filled with Bugattis Type 35Bs and Cs, except for the single Alfa Romeo belonging to Luigi Platé. Many of the top French drivers were present including Louis Chiron (back from America), Philippe de Rothschild, Guy Bouriat, René Dreyfus, Philippe Étancelin and Marcel Lehoux. Running to the AIACR fuel-formula, fourteen cars started in the rain. Chiron, having recently won the German GP (for sports cars), had pole position but it was “Philippe” who took the lead, just ahead of Chilean Juan Zanelli. Barely into the second lap, heavy rain arrived, making driving treacherous. Zanelli passed de Rothschild on the third lap. When it eased off on the fifth lap, the lead swapped again. Zanelli retired on lap 9 with steering issues leaving “Philippe” with a 3-minute advantage over Chiron, Étancelin and Dreyfus. By lap 14 the sun was back out but Chiron lost five minutes limping back to the pits with a burst tyre. Despite a second puncture, Chiron's hard driving got him back up to second by lap 18. The leading two pitted at the halfway point (lap 20) for fuel and tyres. De Rothschild handed over to Bouriat who had retired his car, while Étancelin and Lehoux, now up to fourth, were the last cars on the lead lap. Having nursed his car earlier in the race, Chiron was able to push harder and take the lead. On lap 30 the rain returned but Chiron had a 4-minute lead over Bouriat. Étancelin spun on the slippery roads and had to retire while Lehoux and Dreyfus were a lap down. Even though Chiron had another puncture before the end of the race, his lead was such that he still won by almost six minutes.

=== End of the season ===
After the tragic Italian Grand Prix in 1928 the race was not held this year as the circuit underwent an upgrade. In lieu of it, the Monza Grand Prix was held for the Italian Championship, just using the oval course. It was staged as a series of three 99 km heats leading onto a final of the same 22-lap length. With total prizemoney of 450,000 lire, it attracted the best diversity of cars for the season. In the 1500cc class were the Talbots of Scuderia Materassi, driven by Arcangeli and Nuvolari. As well as several privateer Maseratis there were two purple Miller 91 FDs brought over from America by “Leon Duray”. They would be raced by himself and former Delage driver, Edmond Bourlier. Earlier, Duray had gone to Montlhéry to set speed records, getting to 230 km/h in his Miller for a flying kilometre. The 3-litre class featured the works teams Varzi and Brilli-Peri in the Alfa Romeo P2 and Borzacchini in the Maserati 26B. Privateer Bugattis were raced by Foresti, Biondetti and Zanelli. Bourlier's Miller was slightly bored out to 1558cc to instead race in the 3-litre category. The over-3-litre class had Alfieri Maserati presenting the debut of the new Maserati V4 with its twin 8-cylinder engine. Its competition was three Mercedes-Benz. Swiss-Italian Fritz Caflisch had an S-model, while the Daimler-Benz works team sent August Momberger in an SSK tourer and Adolf Rosenberger in a 1921 Targa Florio model, with its venerable 1914 4.5-litre Mercedes engine, now supercharged.

An immense crowd arrived on a very hot autumn day. In the first heat, in the familiar territory of a banked oval, Duray was very competitive against the Talbots. But despite setting the fastest lap of the heat, damaged engine bearing forced his retirement. Instead he took Bourlier's place in the second heat, which started badly for Varzi who had to stop after one lap to secure his radiator cap that had been left open. Brilli Peri, in the other Alfa Romeo, was controlling the race ahead of Borzacchini, Biondetti and Duray. But once again, Duray's second car was sidelined with engine issues – possibly due to the lack of its specialist oil lubrication. Varzi had fought back to third and that was how they finished with the three qualifiers being Brilli Peri, Borzacchini and Varzi. With only four starters, the third heat was more pedestrian. Rosenberger retired on lap 4 with spark plug issues. Maserati had steadily built a 20-second lead by halfway then, knowing he would qualify, eased off to be pipped at the line by Momberger's Mercedes. Although not deliberate, it angered many locals who thought he had thrown the race, having bet on him with the on-site bookies. After a 2-hour luncheon break, the nine finalists came to the grid, lined up in two rows, 5 by 4. From the start Varzi took the lead but Maserati charged hard and took the lead on the second lap. Borzacchini, Arcangeli and Brilli-Peri filled out the top-five positions and running within six seconds of the leader in a slip-streaming battle. The two Mercedes sports cars lumbered around, soon finding the pace too rough, as did Amedeo Ruggeri in his 1.5-litre Maserati. Borzacchini and Brilli-Peri had to pit to change tyres then on lap 11, at halfway, Maserati also headed for the pits to change spark-plugs. This left only the Talbots of Arcangeli and Nuvolari on the same lap as Varzi, albeit 30 seconds behind. Varzi had a trouble-free race and took an easy victory. A broken ignition wire forced Arcangeli to retire with two laps to go. Nuvolari came second a lap behind, while Momberger also avoided issues to take third.

Varzi's fourth victory made him Italian champion for the year. A fortnight later on the long straights to the east of Cremona, Borzacchini took the Maserati V4 and set a record on the 10 km trial, with an average speed of 246 km/h, 20 km/h faster than Brilli-Peri in the Alfa P2. However, the latter got his revenge winning the season-ending race at Tunis before selling the car back to the Alfa factory.

At the end of the year, “Leon Duray” arranged with Jean Bugatti to swap his two front-wheel-drive Millers for three 2.3-litre Type 43 sports cars. Bugatti saw great potential for his father in evaluating the American cars and their advanced twin-overhead-cam engine. It would lead directly to the development of the Bugatti Type 51. The October Wall Street Crash would cast a shadow over racing as manufacturers retrenched, or collapsed altogether. Most of the American wooden speedways had closed, their boards rotting. One of the major casualties would be Harry Miller – each car took 6500 working hours to build and cost US$15000. However, others saw an opportunity. Enzo Ferrari had seen the vacillation of Alfa Romeo to run a full works team, as well as the ongoing example of Scuderia Materassi, decided in September to set up his own privateer team. In December, the 31-year old experienced Alfa Romeo driver was given the works backing to represent the Italian marque and another legend had started.

== Results of the season's major races ==
Pos	Driver	Team	MON (Monaco)	ALS (Italy)	TGF (Italy)	ROM (Italy)	IND (United States)	MUG (Italy)	FRA (France)	CCN (Italy)	SEB (Spain)	MNZ (Italy)	CRE (Italy)	TUN (Tunisia)
	(Italy) Achille Varzi	Alfa Corse		1	Ret	1		5		1		1	2	Ret
	(Italy) Gastone Brilli-Peri	Scuderia Materassi; Alfa Corse		13	3	2		1		5		4	1	1
	(United Kingdom) “Williams”	Private Entry; Usines Bugatti	1			DNS			1					
	(France) Albert Divo	Usines Bugatti			1				4					
	(Monaco) Louis Chiron	Private Entry					7				1			
	(United States) Ray Keech	Maude A. Yagle					1	[†]						
	(Italy) Tazio Nuvolari	Scuderia Nuvolari; Alfa Corse; Scuderia Materassi		DNS		Ret		9		2		2	Ret	
	(France) Marcel Lehoux	Private Entry	Ret								3			2
	(France) Philippe de Rothschild	Private Entry	4						Ret		2			
	(Romania) Georges Bouriano	Private Entry	2			Ret		Ret			7			
	(Italy) Baconin Borzacchini	Officine Alfieri Maserati		2	Ret	Ret		Ret				7	Ret	Ret
	(Italy) Ferdinando Minoia	Usines Bugatti			2									
	(United States) Louis Meyer	Private Entry					2							
	(Italy) Giuseppe Morandi	Fabbrica Officine Meccaniche						2		Ret [2]				
	(France) André Boillot	Fabbrica Officine Meccaniche							2					
	(Italy) Ernesto Maserati	Officine Alfieri Maserati		3	Ret	Ret		11		13			3	6
	(France) René Dreyfus	Private Entry	5								4			3
	(Italy) Giuseppe Campari	SA Alfa Romeo			4			6		3				
	(Italy) Enrico Benini	SA Alfa Romeo						3		9				
	(Germany) Rudolf Caracciola	Daimler-Benz AG	3											
	(United States) Jimmy Gleason	Duesenberg Brothers					3							
	(Italy) Caberto Conelli	Usines Bugatti			Ret				3					
	(Germany) August Momberger	Daimler-Benz AG				Ret						3		
	(Italy) Luigi Arcangeli	Scuderia Materassi		Ret		4		Ret		4		Ret	4	
	(France) Philippe Étancelin	Private Entry	6								Ret			4
	(Italy) Arrigo Sartorio	Private Entry		4				12					7	
	(Italy) Carlo Pintacuda	Scuderia Materassi				8		4		DNS				
	(United States) Carl Marchese	Duesenberg Brothers					4							
	(Switzerland) / (Italy) Fritz Caflisch	Private Entry				6						5	DNS	
	(Italy) Pietro Ghersi	Private Entry	DNS	5						7				
	(Italy) Cleto Nenzioni	Private Entry		Ret		5		Ret				Ret		
	(United States) Freddie Winnai	Duesenberg Brothers					5							
	(France) Robert Sénéchal	Private Entry							5					
	(France) Edmond Bourlier	Private Entry									5			
	(Italy) Filippo Sartorio	Private Entry		Ret		Ret				Ret			5	
	(France) ? Albert de Bondeli	Private Entry												5
	(Italy) Amedeo Ruggeri	Private Entry		6	Ret			16		Ret		8	Ret	
	(United States) Speed Gardner	F.P. Cramer					6							
	(France) Robert Gauthier	Private Entry							6					
	(Italy) Cesare Pastore	Private Entry								6				
	(France) Jean de Maleplane	Private Entry									6			Ret
	(Italy) Alfieri Maserati	Officine Alfieri Maserati						[11]				6		
	(Italy) Luigi 'Gigi' Premoli	Private Entry											6	
Pos	Driver	Team	MON (Monaco)	ALS (Italy)	TGF (Italy)	ROM (Italy)	IND (United States)	MUG (Italy)	FRA (France)	CCN (Italy)	SEB (Spain)	MNZ (Italy)	CRE (Italy)	TUN (Tunisia)

italics show the driver of the race's fastest lap.
Only those drivers with a best finish of 6th or better are shown. Sources:

Citations
