= Heinrich-Joachim von Morgen =

German racing driver (1902–32)

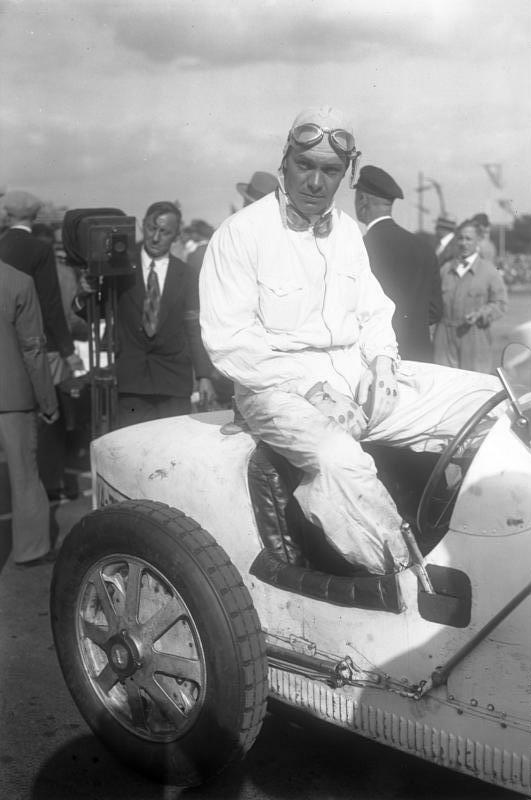
- At the Nürburgring in 1928
- Born: 1 February 1902 Berlin, Germany
- Died: 28 May 1932 (aged 30) Nürburgring, Germany

Heinrich-Joachim von Morgen (1 February 1902 – 27 May 1932) was a German Grand Prix racing driver.

== Career ==
Von Morgen was the son of an infantry general, Curt von Morgen, and his family wealth ensured he could start a racing career in 1927, driving an Amilcar in one of the first meetings at the new Nürburgring circuit.

In 1930, he took a step up in class by buying a Bugatti Type 35B for hillclimbs, and joined forces with Hermann zu Leiningen and Ernst Burggaller to form a team (the German Bugatti Team). Von Morgen proved the quickest driver of the three; he won the 1930 Eifelrennen, albeit against a weak field, and, in the Masarykuv Okruh in Czechoslovakia, swapped his own ailing Bugatti (while leading) for zu Leningen's car, and brought the latter car through to overall victory. He also had significant success in hillclimbing, culminating in winning a round of the 1930 German Mountain Championship at Schauinsland, beating Hans Stuck into second, and finishing third in the overall championship.

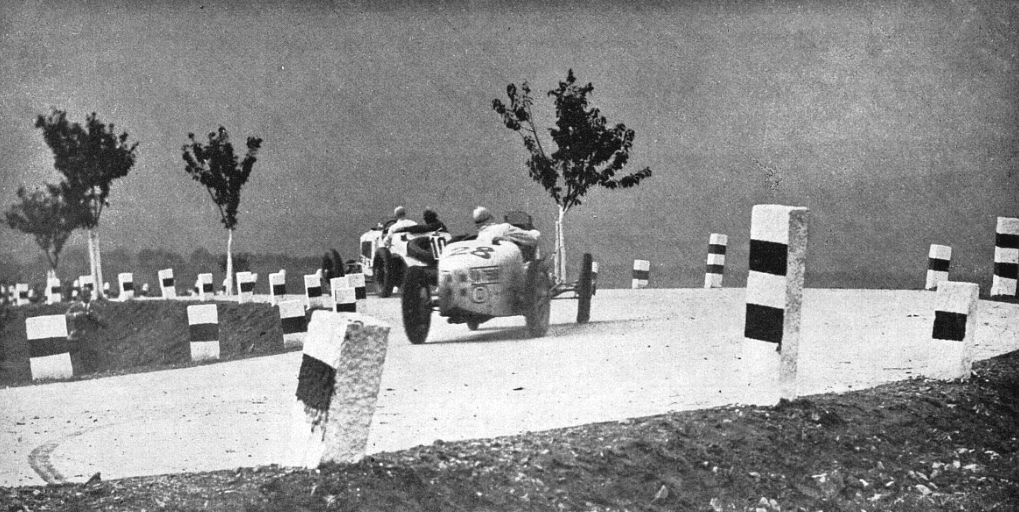
Following Caracciola at the 1930 Masarykuv Okruh

The German Bugatti Team split before 1931, and von Morgen entered under his own name, generally concentrating on the second-tier races, but he did take part at the 1931 Monaco Grand Prix, proving quick in practice but retiring early in the race. He was second to Rudolf Caracciola in the 1932 Eifelrennen, albeit "Caratsch" was driving a Mercedes-Benz SSKL rather than a thoroughbred racing car, and he ran as high as third in the 1931 German Grand Prix, retiring on the penultimate lap while in sixth.

Before the 1931 Avusrennen, von Morgen he sold the T35B to Paul Pietsch, and bought a 2.3-litre Bugatti Type 51 (chassis #51139) which he had bought from Achille Varzi. In it he finished second at the Avusrennen and third at the 1931 Masarykuv Okruh.

Von Morgen's promising career continued with a fastest practice time at the 1932 Reale Premio di Roma and a third-place finish, ahead of Varzi (who had lost time with a tyre stop); he also tried a new Type 54 in the Tunis Grand Prix.

=== Death ===
On 28 May 1932, in practice for the Eifelrennen, von Morgen rolled his Bugatti at Hatzenbach, and, although the Bugatti was virtually undamaged, the 6'4" von Morgen was crushed by the roll, and he died of his injuries.

== Personal life ==
Von Morgen married Elfriede "Elfi" Nieders in 1932; at the time of von Morgen's death, Elfi was pregnant, and she ultimately gave birth to a son whom she named Heinrich-Joachim Jr. The Bugatti was sold to Egon Brütsch.
