= Ulrich Maag =

Swiss racing driver (1910–1934)

- Born: Ulrich Maag; 23 July 1910 Zurich, Switzerland
- Died: 10 August 1934 (aged 24) Parma, Italy

Ulrich Maag (23 July 1910 – 10 August 1934) was a Swiss racing driver, who took part in one Grand Prix.

== Career ==
Maag's father Rudolf enjoyed racing cars and Maag trained as a mechanic, with a view to opening his own garage. Maag started racing in 1932, when just 21 years old, entering an MG in Swiss hillclimbs. He soon moved up to a Bugatti Type 35C and won the Swiss hillclimb championship in 1933, as well as taking part in three events in the European Mountain Championship that year.

In 1934, he stepped up to Grandes Epreuves, ordering a Maserati 8C, but, given delays with delivery, ordered an Alfa Romeo 8C 2300; driving with fellow Swiss racer Hans Ruesch, he failed to finish the 1934 Mille Miglia, but did finish the two races for Grand Prix cars at the Nurburgring that year, the Eifelrennen and German Grand Prix, both times in sixth position. However, he was disqualified from the Grand Prix as he had lightened the Alfa for the weigh-in - at the time Grand Prix racing had a maximum weight limit.

== Death ==
Maag entered the Alfa for the Targa Abruzzo 24-hour race in August 1934 over the Pescara Circuit, recruiting Ruesch as his team-mate once more. En route to the race, Maag took a corner on the Via Emilia in San Pancrazio Parmense at speed, crashed into a stationary truck on the other side, and was killed.
