= 1929 German Grand Prix =

Race details
- Date: 14 July 1929
- Official name: IV Großer Preis von Deutschland
- Location: Nürburgring; Nürburg, Germany
- Course: Permanent racing facility
- Course length: 28.265 km (17.564 miles)
- Distance: 18 laps, 508.77 km (311.82 miles)

Fastest lap
Driver	(Monaco) Louis Chiron	Bugatti
- Time: 15:06.1

Podium
First	(Monaco) Louis Chiron	Bugatti
Second	(France) "Georges Philippe"	Bugatti
Third	(Germany) August Momberger (Germany) Max Arco-Zinneberg	Mercedes-Benz

The 1929 German Grand Prix was a Grand Prix motor race held at the Nürburgring on 14 July 1929.

== Classification ==
=== Race ===
Pos	Driver	Team	Car	Laps	Time/Retired
1	(Monaco) Louis Chiron	Bugatti	Bugatti Type 35C	18	4:46:06.4
2	(France) "Georges Philippe"	Bugatti	Bugatti Type 35C	18	+11:45.8
3	(Germany) August Momberger (Germany) Max Arco-Zinneberg	Daimler-Benz	Mercedes-Benz SSK	18	+14:31.6
4	(France) Guy Bouriat	Bugatti	Bugatti Type 35C	18	+17:28.2
5	(Switzerland) Mario Lepori	Bugatti	Bugatti Type 35B	18	
6	(Germany) Willy Rosenstern (Germany) Adolff Rosenberger	Daimler-Benz	Mercedes-Benz SSK	18	
7	(Germany) Eckhart von Kalnein	Private entry	Bugatti T35B		
8	(Germany) E.G. von Burggaller	Private entry	Bugatti T37A		
9	(Germany) Baron D.de Sterrlich	Private entry	Maserati		
10	(Germany) Hans Kersting	Private entry	Bugatti T37A		
11	(Italy) Francesco Pirola	Private entry	Alfa Romeo		
Ret	(Germany) Berthold Stoll	Private entry	Fiat		
Ret	(Italy) Amadeo Ruggeri	Private entry	Maserati		
Ret	(Germany) Gerhard Macher	Private entry	DKW		
Ret	(Germany) Birven	Private entry	Impéria		
Ret	(Germany) Otokar Bittmann	Bugatti	Bugatti T35C		
Ret	(Germany) Helmut Butenuth	Private entry	Hanomag		
Ret	(Germany) Ernst Burggaller	Private entry	Bugatti T35B		
Ret	(Germany) Rudolf Caracciola	Daimler-Benz	Mercedes-Benz SSK		
Ret	(Germany) Hugo Urban Emmerich	Private entry	Talbot		
Ret	(Germany) Karl Häberle	Private entry	Bugatti T35B		
Ret	(Germany) Anton Kahle	Private entry	Z		
Ret	(Germany) Georg Kimpel	Daimler-Benz	Mercedes-Benz SSK		
Ret	(Estonia) Eduard Klimberg	Private entry	Renault 40CV Torpedo Sport		
Ret	(Czechoslovakia) Josef Mamula	Private entry	Z		
Ret	(Czechoslovakia) Ernst Prochazka	Private entry	Z		
Ret	(Italy) Antonio Sartorio	Private entry	Alfa Romeo		
Ret	(Germany) Willy Scholl	Private entry	Amilcar		
Ret	(Germany) Ing. Schulze	Private entry	Bugatti T37A		
Ret	(Germany) Willy Seibel	Private entry	Bugatti T37A		
Ret	(Germany) Hans Simons	Private entry	DKW		
Ret	(Czechoslovakia) Karl Stohanzl	Private entry	Z		
Ret	(Czechoslovakia) Karl Tunal Divisek	Private entry	Z		
Ret	(Czechoslovakia) Wilheim	Private entry	Lombard		

Grand Prix Race
1929 Grand Prix season
Previous race: 1928 German Grand Prix	German Grand Prix	Next race: 1931 German Grand Prix
