= Mercedes-Benz M06 engine =

Mercedes-Benz M06
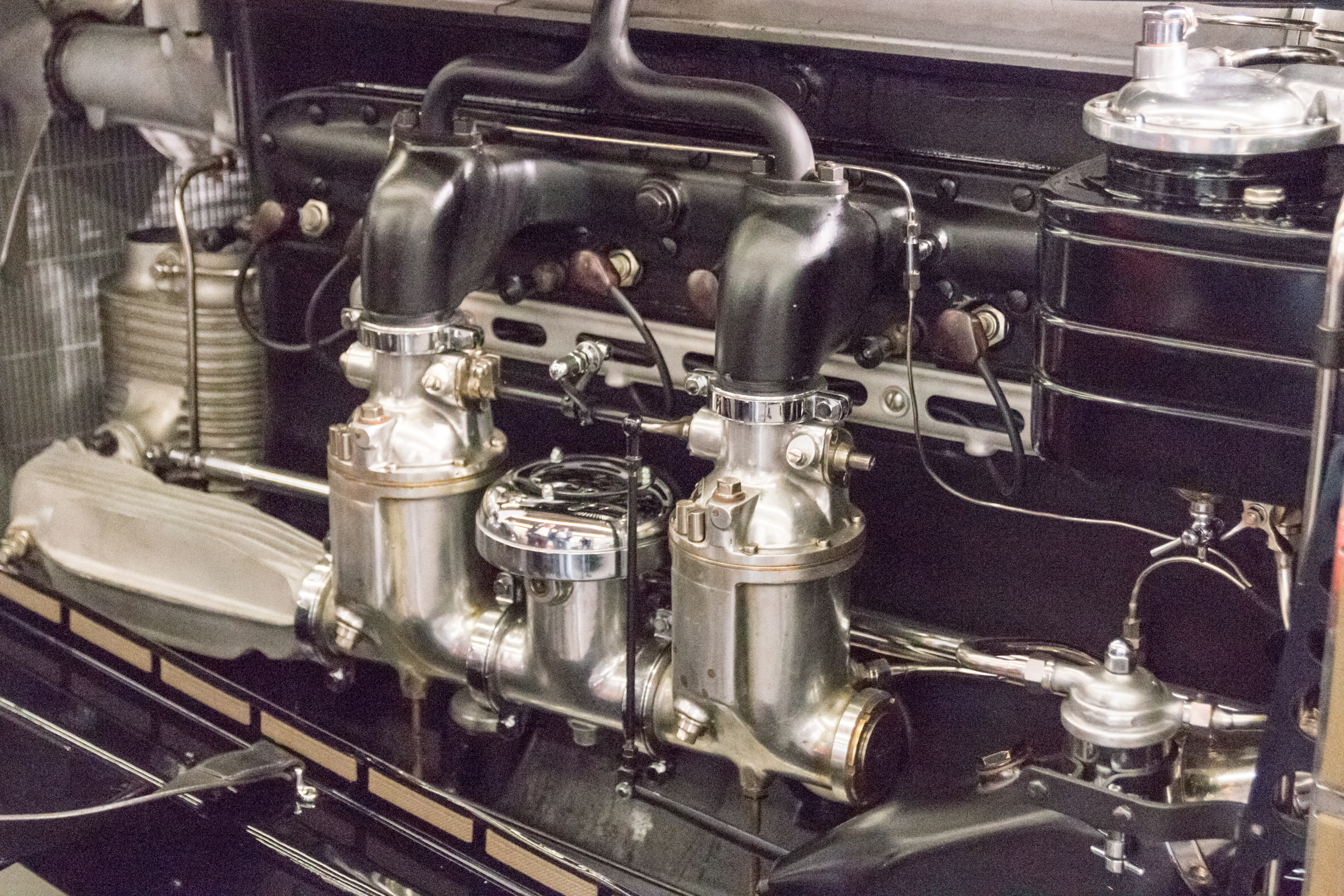
- Mercedes Benz M06 engine

Overview
- Manufacturer: Mercedes-Benz
- Production: 1929–1935

Layout
- Configuration: Inline-6
- Displacement: 6.8–7.1 L (415–433 cu in)
- Cylinder bore: 98–100 mm (3.9–3.9 in)
- Piston stroke: 150 mm (5.9 in)
- Valvetrain: 12-valve, SOHC, two-valves per cylinder
- Compression ratio: 4.7:1–7.0:1

Combustion
- Supercharger: Roots-type supercharger
- Fuel system: Carburetor
- Fuel type: Gasoline
- Oil system: Dry sump

Output
- Power output: 158–300 hp (118–224 kW)
- Torque output: 332–507 lb⋅ft (450–687 N⋅m)

The Mercedes-Benz M06 engine is a supercharged, 6.8-liter to 7.1-liter, straight-6, internal combustion piston engine, designed, developed and produced by Mercedes-Benz; between 1928 and 1934.

== M06 engine ==
The M06 has a supercharged, single overhead camshaft, 7-litre straight-6 engine that produces 200–300 metric horsepower (150–220 kW). Depending on state of tune, there is over 500lbs of torque, which made the SSK the fastest car of its day. A clutch operates the supercharger that is engaged by fully depressing the throttle pedal with an extra push, whereas letting off the throttle pedal disengages it.

== Applications ==
- Mercedes-Benz SSK
