= Willy Walb =

German racing driver and engineer (1890–1962)

- Born: Wilhelm Walb; 12 March 1890 Heidelberg, Germany
- Died: 27 June 1962 (aged 72) Stuttgart, Germany

Willy Walb (12 March 1890 – 27 June 1962) was a German Grand Prix racing driver and engineer.

== Career ==
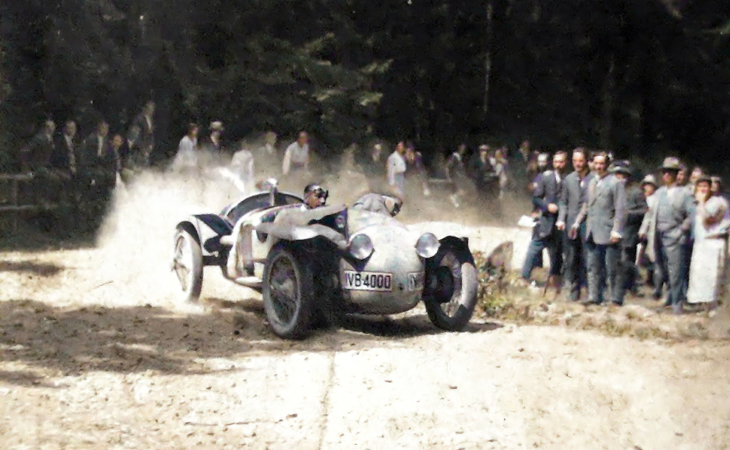
In a Benz Tropfenwagen at the Königstuhl hillclimb in Heidelberg, with Wilhelm Sebastian as riding mechanic, 1924

Walb joined Benz & Cie as an engineer in 1914, and worked on aero engines, before taking over the test department after the First World War. As overseer of the Benz Grand Prix team, he occasionally took the wheel driving the Tropfenwagen Grand Prix car; he focussed mostly on hillclimbing, but drove in the 1923 Italian Grand Prix (also termed the European Grand Prix that year), retiring through a holed piston after 4 laps.

Walb retained his role after the 1925 merger with Mercedes. His final drive came in the 1928 German Grand Prix, the field consisting mostly of domestic sportscars, finishing 3rd in a Mercedes 1–2–3.

=== Racing manager ===
In 1934, Walb became manager of the Auto Union racing operation, headhunted in part because of his experience with rear-engined vehicles; he recruited the unknown Bernd Rosemeyer for the team after observing him in testing. In December 1935, after Auto Union appointed Dr Karl Feuereissen to the headship of the racing department, Walb was moved into heading up the development of Wanderer touring cars. After the Second World War he became head of customer relations at Volkswagen at Stuttgart.
