= 1931 German Grand Prix =

Race details
- Date: 19 July 1931
- Official name: V Großer Preis von Deutschland
- Location: Nürburgring; Nürburg, Germany
- Course: Permanent racing facility
- Course length: 22.810 km (14.173 miles)
- Distance: 22 laps, 501.82 km (311.82 miles)

Pole position
Driver	(Germany) Manfred von Brauchitsch	Mercedes-Benz

Fastest lap
Driver	(Italy) Achille Varzi	Bugatti
- Time: 11:48.0

Podium
First	(Germany) Rudolf Caracciola	Mercedes-Benz
Second	(Monaco) Louis Chiron	Bugatti
Third	(Italy) Achille Varzi	Bugatti

The 1931 German Grand Prix was a Grand Prix motor race held at the Nürburgring on 19 July 1931. There were two races held simultaneously, Class I for Grand Prix cars over 1100cc over 22 laps, and Class II for cars and cyclecars with capacity 500–1100cc over 18 laps. The race distances were chosen to make both races take approximately the same amount of time, but there were no prizes for outright positions, only for class results.

== Classification ==
=== Race ===
==== Class I ====
Pos	No	Driver	Team	Car	Laps	Time/Retired	Grid
1	8	(Germany) Rudolf Caracciola	Daimler-Benz	Mercedes-Benz SSKL	22	4:38:10	4
2	26	(Monaco) Louis Chiron	Bugatti	Bugatti T51	22	+1:18	11
3	28	(Italy) Achille Varzi	Bugatti	Bugatti T51	22	+4:00	12
4	44	(Italy) Tazio Nuvolari	Alfa Corse	Alfa Romeo 8C-2300	22	+5:06	18
5	12	(Germany) Otto Merz	Daimler-Benz	Mercedes-Benz SSKL	22	+5:44	6
6	10	(Germany) Hans Stuck	Daimler-Benz	Mercedes-Benz SSKL	22	+9:24	5
7	32	(France) Guy Bouriat	Bugatti	Bugatti T51	22	+11:54	14
8	48	(France) Jean-Pierre Wimille	Private entry	Bugatti T51	22	+13:58	19
9	22	(Germany) Otto Spandel	Private entry	Mercedes-Benz SSK	22	+16:35	9
10	24	(United Kingdom) Henry Birkin	Maserati	Maserati 26M	22	+22:53	10
11	42	(United Kingdom) Earl Howe	Private entry	Bugatti T51	22	+30:09	17
Ret	6	(Germany) Heinrich-Joachim von Morgen	Bugatti	Bugatti T51	21	Oil pressure	3
Ret	16	(France) René Dreyfus	Maserati	Maserati 26M	16	Gearbox	8
Ret	34	(France) Marcel Lehoux	Bugatti	Bugatti T51	14	Accident	15
Ret	14	(Italy) Luigi Fagioli	Maserati	Maserati 26M	13	Gearbox	7
Ret	2	(Germany) Manfred von Brauchitsch	Daimler-Benz	Mercedes-Benz SSKL	12	Differential	1
Ret	38	(United States) Phil Shafer	Private entry	Shafer Special Buick	12	Suspension	16
Ret	4	(Germany) Ernst-Günther Burggaller	Private entry	Bugatti T35B	3	Engine	2
Ret	30	(United Kingdom) William Grover-Williams	Private entry	Bugatti T51	2	Engine	13

==== Class II ====
Pos	No	Driver	Team	Car	Laps	Time/Retired
1	78	(United Kingdom) Dudley Froy	Private entry	Riley	18	4:23:56.6
2	72	(Germany) Engelbert Graf Arco	Private entry	Amilcar		4:32:18.0
3	82	(France) José Scaron	Private entry	Amilcar		4:32:52.5
4	90	Marcel Rouleau	Private entry	Amilcar		5:07:22.0
5	88	(United Kingdom) Francis Samuelson	Private entry	MG		5:09:52.2
6	68	(Germany) Gerhard Macher	Private entry	DKW		5:13:50.0
7	56	Fritz Theissen	DKW	DKW		5:24:18.6
Ret	52	(Germany) Toni Bauhofer	DKW	DKW	4	Clutch
Ret	54	(Germany) Hans Simons (de)	DKW	DKW	3	Clutch
Ret	76	(Italy) Luigi Premoli	Private entry	Salmson	3	Axle
Ret	58	(Germany) Rudolf Steinweg	Private entry	Amilcar	1	Accident
Ret	66	(Czechoslovakia) Hugo Urban-Emmrich	Private entry	MG	1	Accident

Grand Prix Race
Previous race: 1931 Belgian Grand Prix	1931 Grand Prix season Grandes Épreuves	Next race: 1932 Italian Grand Prix
Previous race: 1929 German Grand Prix	German Grand Prix	Next race: 1932 German Grand Prix
