= Parry Thomas =

Parry Thomas is the name of:

- J. G. Parry-Thomas (1884–1927), racecar driver
- E. Parry Thomas (1921–2016), Las Vegas banker
