= Mercedes-Benz SSK =

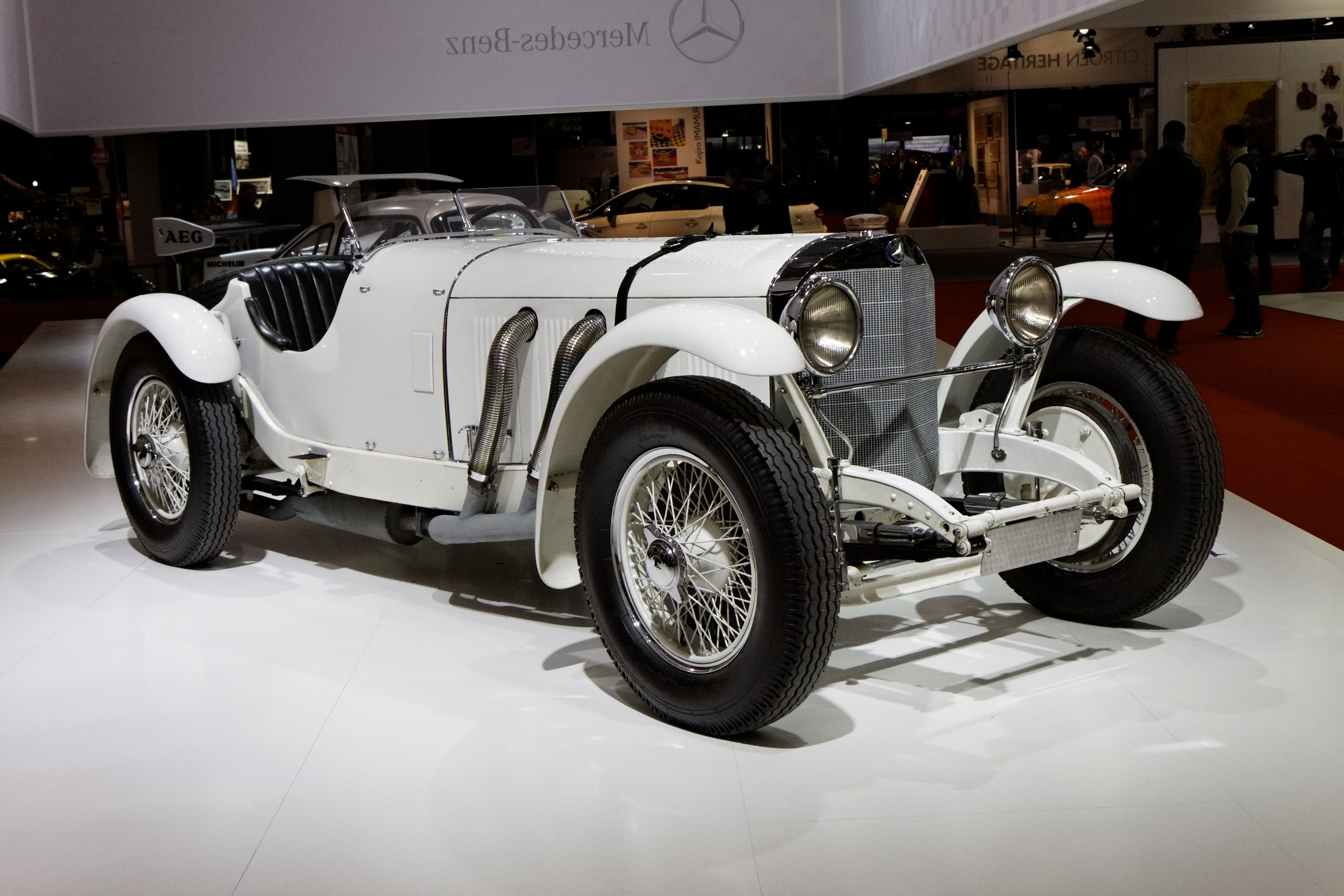

Overview
- Manufacturer: Mercedes-Benz
- Production: 1928–1932
- Assembly: Germany: Bremen
- Designer: Ferdinand Porsche

Body and chassis
- Class: Sports car (S)
- Body style: 2-door roadster
- Layout: FMR layout

Powertrain
- Engine: supercharged M06 7,069 cc (7.1 L) SOHC I6
- Transmission: 4-speed non-synchro manual

Dimensions
- Wheelbase: 116 in (2,950 mm)
- Length: 167 in (4,240 mm)
- Width: 67 in (1,700 mm)
- Height: 68 in (1,730 mm)
- Curb weight: 3,750 lb (1,700 kg)

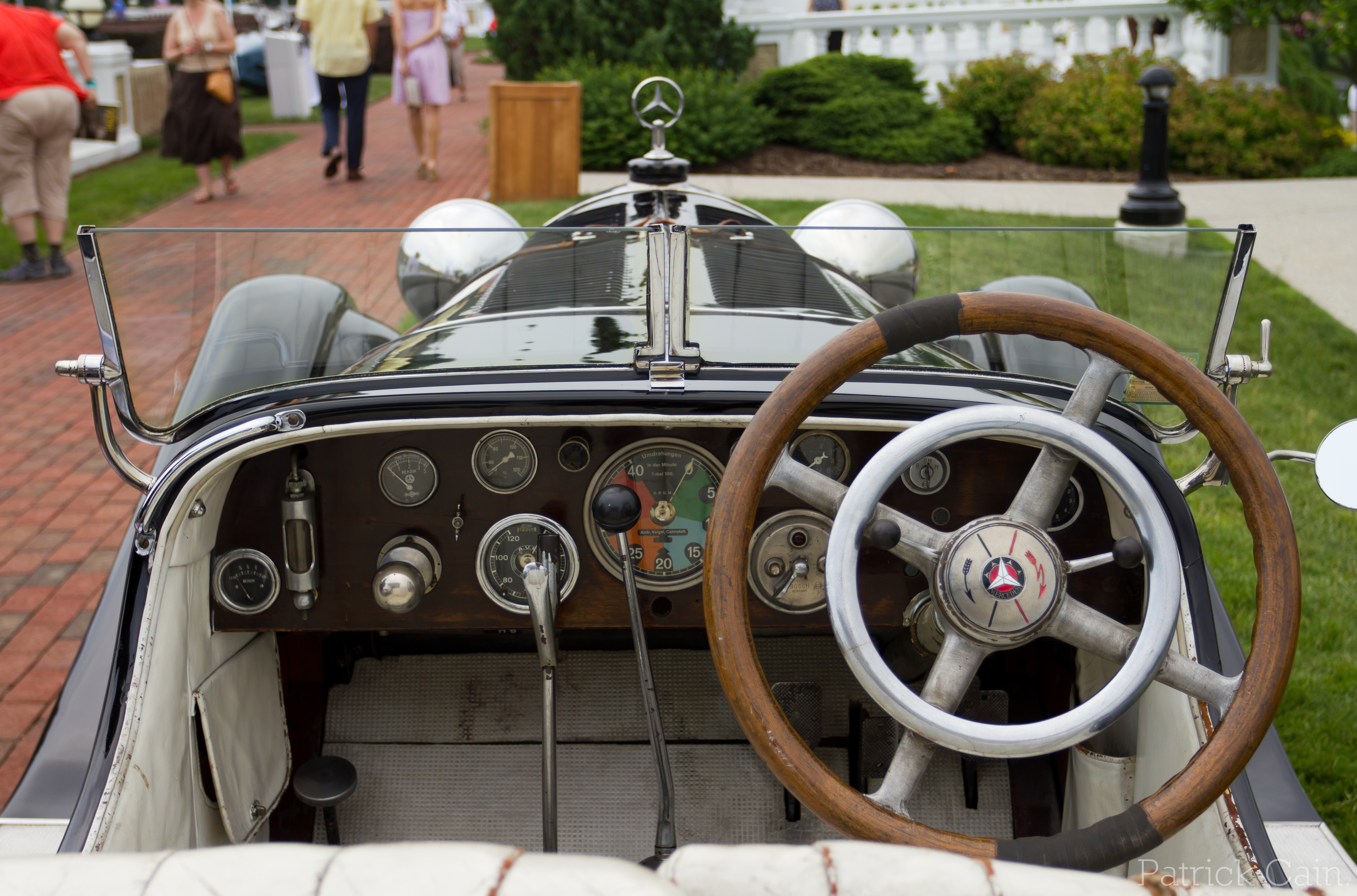
Mercedes-Benz SSK salon

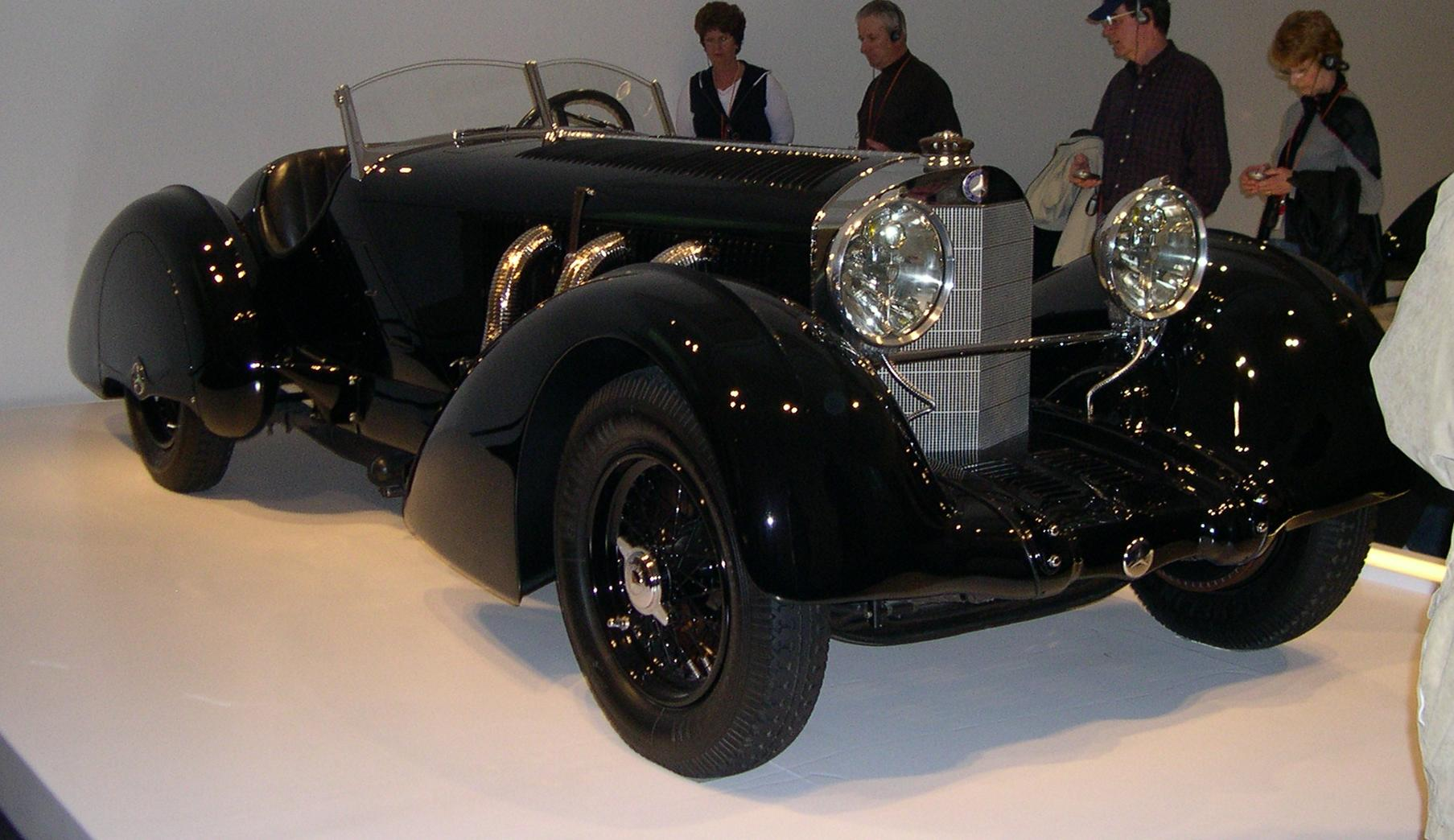
Streamlined Count Trossi-bodied Mercedes-Benz SSK

The Mercedes-Benz SSK (W06) is a roadster built by German automobile manufacturer Mercedes-Benz between 1928 and 1932. The name is an abbreviation of Super Sport Kurz, German for "Super Sport Short", as it was a short wheelbase development of the Mercedes-Benz Modell S. The SSK's performance and numerous competitive successes made it one of the most highly regarded sports cars of its era.

== Design and achievements ==
The SSK was the last car designed for Mercedes-Benz by Ferdinand Porsche before he left to found his own company. The SSK is an evolution of the 1927 Modell S (S for Sport) which was based on the Modell K (K for "Kurzer Radstand" which means short wheelbase) variant of the Mercedes-Benz Typ 630. The SSK chassis was 19 inches (480 mm) shorter than the Modell S to make the car even lighter and more agile for racing, especially short races and hillclimbs.

Fitted with a supercharged single overhead camshaft 7-litre straight-6 engine producing 200–300 metric horsepower (150–220 kW) and over 500 lb⋅ft (680 N⋅m) of torque (depending on the state of tune), the SSK had a top speed of up to 125 mph (200 km/h), making it the fastest car of its day. The supercharger on the SSK's engine was operated by a clutch that was engaged by fully depressing the throttle pedal and then giving the pedal an extra push. Backing off the throttle pedal disengaged the supercharger clutch.

The SSK was driven to victory in numerous races, including in 1929 the 500 Miles of Argentina, the 1929 and 1930 Cordoba Grands Prix, the 1931 Argentine Grand Prix, and, in the hands of legendary Grand Prix racing driver Rudolf Caracciola, the 1929 Ulster Tourist Trophy race (Ards road circuit), the 1930 Irish Grand Prix, the 1931 German Grand Prix, and the 1931 Mille Miglia.

The S/SS/SSK line was one of the nominees in the penultimate round of voting for the Car of the Century award in 1999, as chosen by a panel of 132 motoring journalists and a public internet vote.

== Authenticity and value ==
Only 33 SSKs were built during its production span, of which about half were sold as Rennwagen (racing cars). Many were crashed while racing and subsequently cannibalised for parts. Only four or five entirely original models remain, and their scarcity and rich heritage make them among the most sought after cars in the world; a 1929 model was auctioned at Bonhams in Chichester in September 2004 for £4.17 million (US$7.4 million), making it the second most expensive automobile ever sold at that time. Another SSK, a streamlined "Count Trossi"–bodied version (see photo) owned and restored by fashion designer Ralph Lauren, has won best of show at both the 1993 Pebble Beach Concours d'Elegance and the 2007 Concorso d'Eleganza Villa d'Este.
