= Manderbach Fahrzeugbau =

The Manderbach Fahrzeugbau company in Wissenbach, Dillkreis, Germany produced light trucks from 1949 to 1956.

== History ==
In 1899, Louis Manderbach founded the Manderbach Fahrzeugbau company in Wissenbach Dillenburg a craft business and manufactured for 30 years Horse-drawn wagons only. In 1926 Manderbach started building delivery vans, initially three-wheeler delivery vans. The front part of the car consisted of half a motorcycle (front fork and engine), at the rear a platform was built on an axle with two wheels.

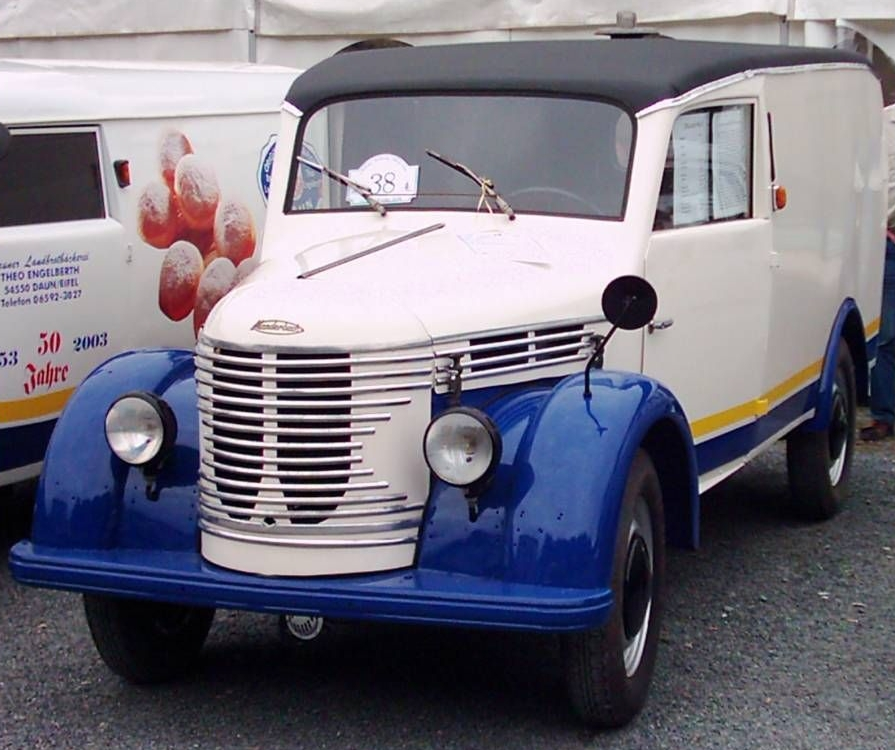
Manderbach panel van

In the 1930s a collaboration with the vehicle manufacturer Framo in Saxony was agreed. Framo produced similar three- and four-wheeler commercial vehicles. Manderbach assembled the Framo vehicles until World War II. In 1949 Manderbach again built its own delivery vans, the Framo design retained.

Manderbach wanted to change production to the air-cooled DKW engines, which were not available for him at the time. He was able to switch to the 1.2 liter Ford Taunus engine. Louis Manderbach died in 1949 and his son took over the company. In 1954, the company had to announce comparison, and commercial vehicle construction was discontinued in 1956. From 1945 to 1956, a total of 598 platform and panel vans were manufactured. Manderbach was still able to sell car bodies until 1960.

== Literature ==
- Deutsche Last- und Lieferwagen. Band 2. Motorbuch Verlag, ISBN 3-613-01197-2, page 479 (German)
