= Hainichen, Saxony =

Hainichen
- Town
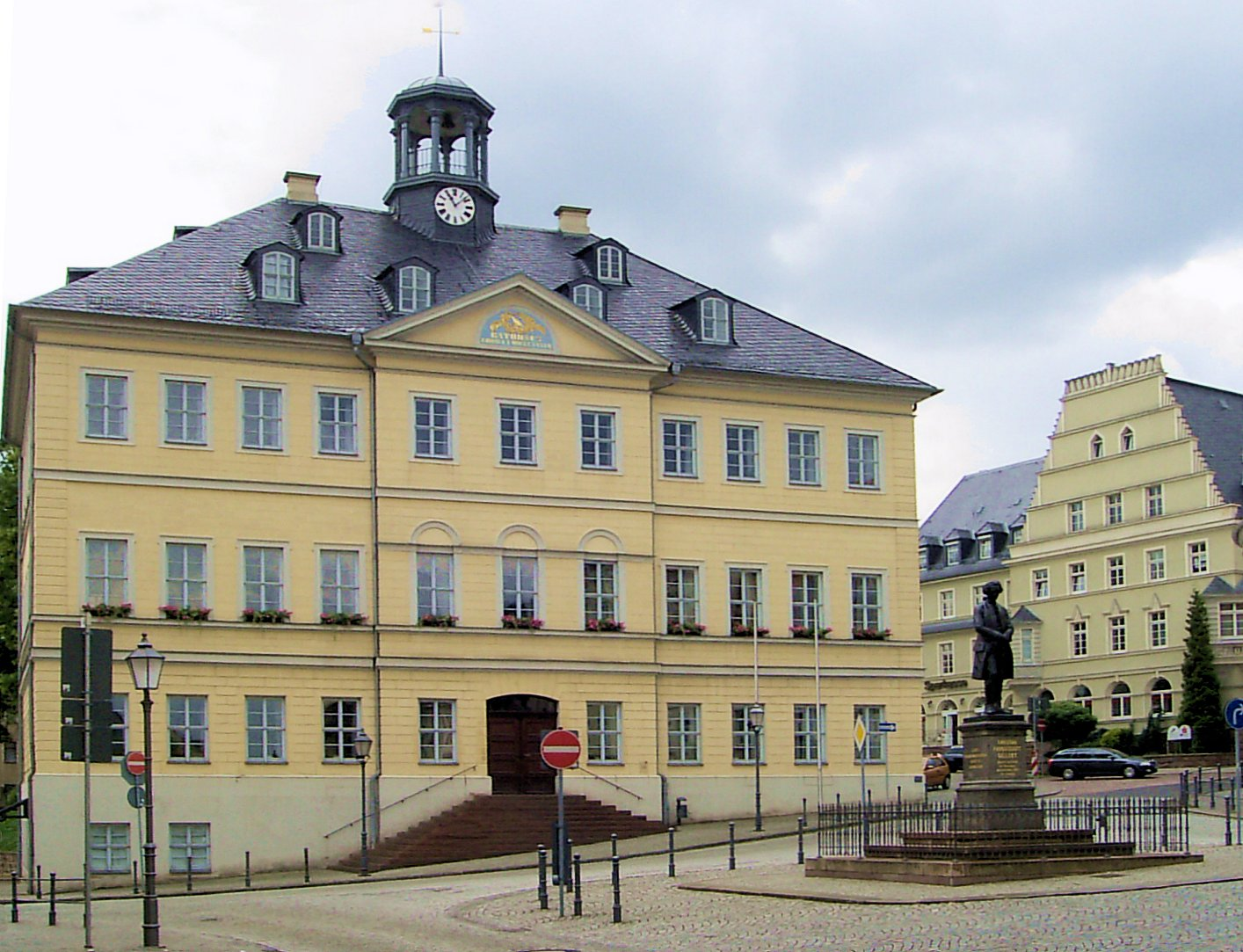
- Hainichen town hall

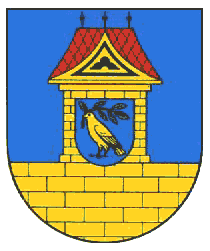
- Coat of arms

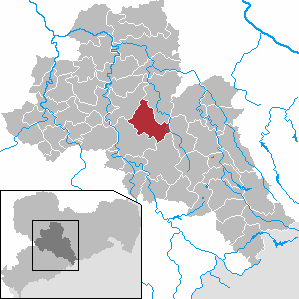
- Location of Hainichen within Mittelsachsen district
- Interactive map of Hainichen
- Location within Germany Location within Saxony
- Coordinates: 50°58′11″N 13°7′31″E
- Country: Germany
- State: Saxony
- District: Mittelsachsen

Government
  - Mayor (2018–25): Dieter Greysinger (SPD)

Area
  - Total: 51.74 km^{2} (19.98 sq mi)
- Elevation: 304 m (997 ft)

Population (2025-12-31)
  - Total: 8,154
  - Density: 157.6/km^{2} (408.2/sq mi)
- Time zone: UTC+01:00 (CET)
  - Summer (DST): UTC+02:00 (CEST)
- Postal codes: 09661
- Dialling codes: 037207
- Vehicle registration: FG, BED, DL, FLÖ, HC, MW, RL
- Website: www.hainichen.de

Hainichen (German pronunciation: [ˈhaɪnɪçn̩]) is a market town in Saxony, Germany. It is located on the river Kleine Striegis and about 15 miles (24 kilometres) north-east of Chemnitz. Hainichen has been shaped by its industrial past.

== History ==
=== From the foundation until industrial revolution ===
A first settlement had been mentioned in 1276 (750 years ago) as villa forensis Heynichen.

Hainichen used to be a place of considerable industry. Its primary manufacture was once that of flannels, baize, and similar fabrics; at the time it may have been called the centre of this industry in Germany.

On April 23, 1800, a F5/T10 tornado caused devastation to the towns of Arnsdorf, Dittersdorf and Etzdorf, near Hainichen. Despite its strength, there were no deaths.

The Gellert institution for the poor was established in 1815.

In 1933, a production plant for small delivery vans and minibuses called Framo moved from nearby Frankenberg to Hainichen. Since then, the automotive industry has been the most important employer.

=== Nazi era ===
An early concentration camp, Hainichen concentration camp, was established in April 1933 and dissolute in June 1933. During World War II, a subcamp of Flossenbürg concentration camp was located here, housing female prisoners working for the Framo enterprise.

=== GDR ===
The former plant of the Framo company was nationalized. The 1960s saw a reingeneering of delivery vans and minibuses under the Barkas B1000 brand. Hainichen became a major producer of parts for these cars.

=== After reunification ===
Production of the B1000 delivery vans and minibuses ceased in 1991.

=== Population statistics ===
Typical for a market town in the east of Germany, Hainichen faces the demographic problem of a steadily declining population.

Year	Population
1834	4,623
1933	8,047
1960	11,188
1998	10,405
1999	10,266

Year	Population
2000	10,061
2001	9,888
2002	9,744
2003	9,628
2004	9,554

Year	Population
2005	9,502
2008	9,131
2010	8,876
2012	8,714

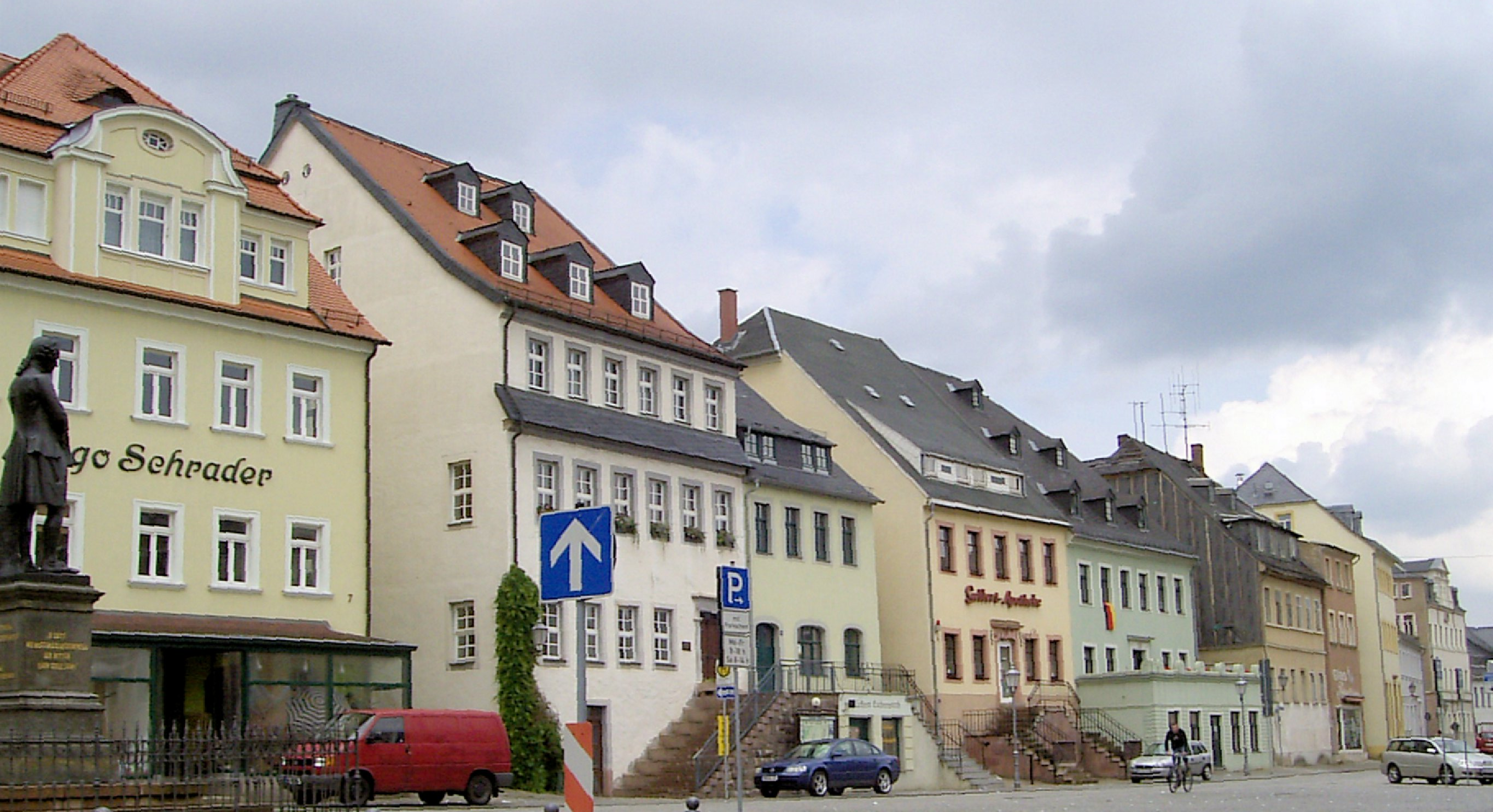
Hainichen Market place

== Leisure and tourism ==
=== Sites and buildings of interest ===
Hainichen is home of a camera obscura.

Other important sights are the Gellert museum (literature museum), Tuchmacherhaus (clothier museum) and a communal park. Hainichen is surrounded by the beautiful valleys of the river Striegis.

=== Sports ===
Hainichen has a communal sports centre with a small indoor pool, a communal outdoor swimming pool and a bowling centre. Also, there is a cycling track nearby.

== Industry ==
Hainichen is characterised by small and medium-sized businesses. The largest employer is the car parts maker Metalsa Automotive Hainichen GmbH (formerly ISE Industries Hainichen GmbH) (429 employees in 2005).

== Districts ==
Areas of the city include

- Bockendorf,
- Cunnersdorf,
- Eulendorf,
- Gersdorf,
- Falkenau,
- Riechberg,
- Siegfried,
- Schlegel and
- Berthelsdorf.

== International relations ==
Hainichen is twinned with:

- Dorsten, Germany

== Famous citizens ==
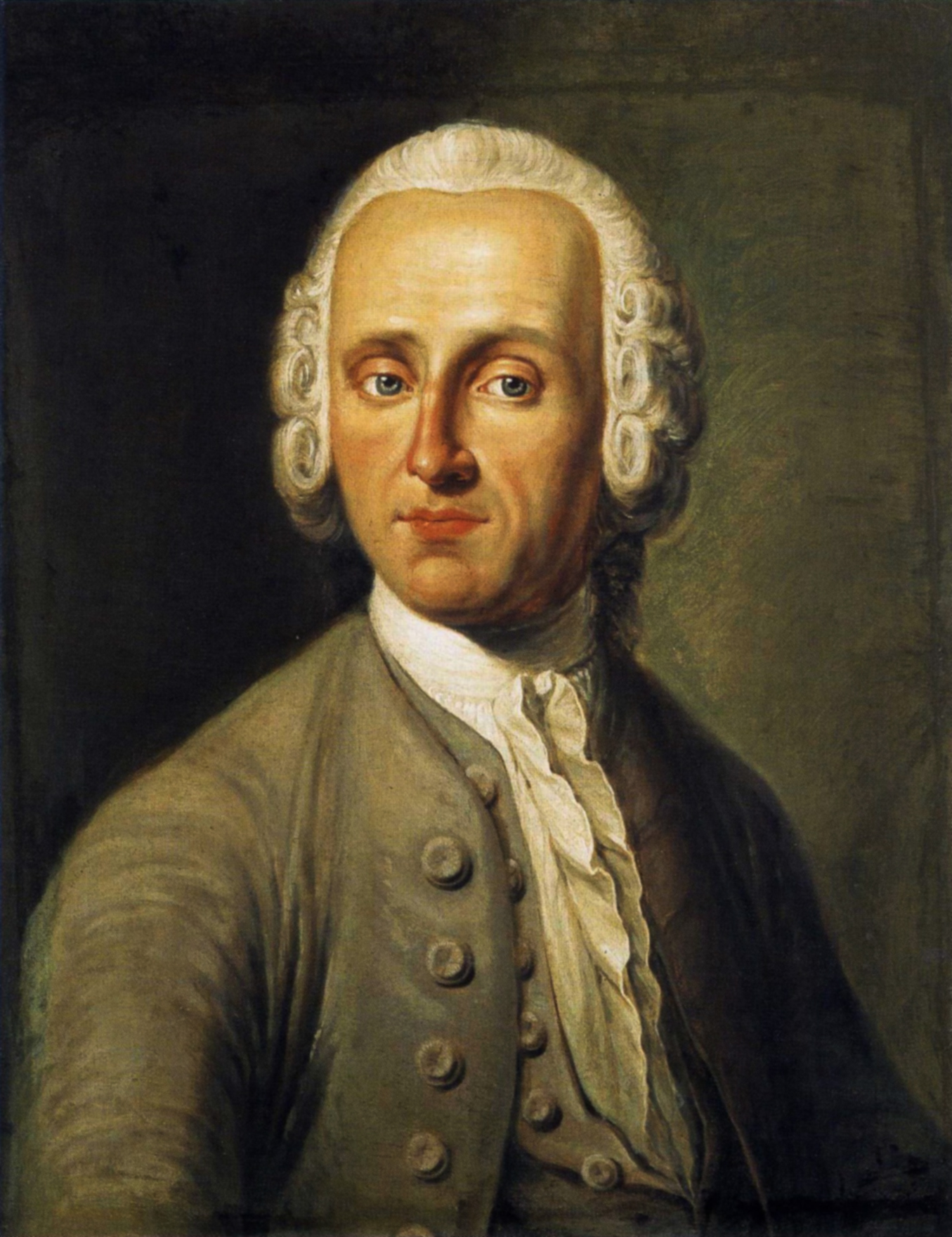
Christian Fürchtegott Gellert in 1752

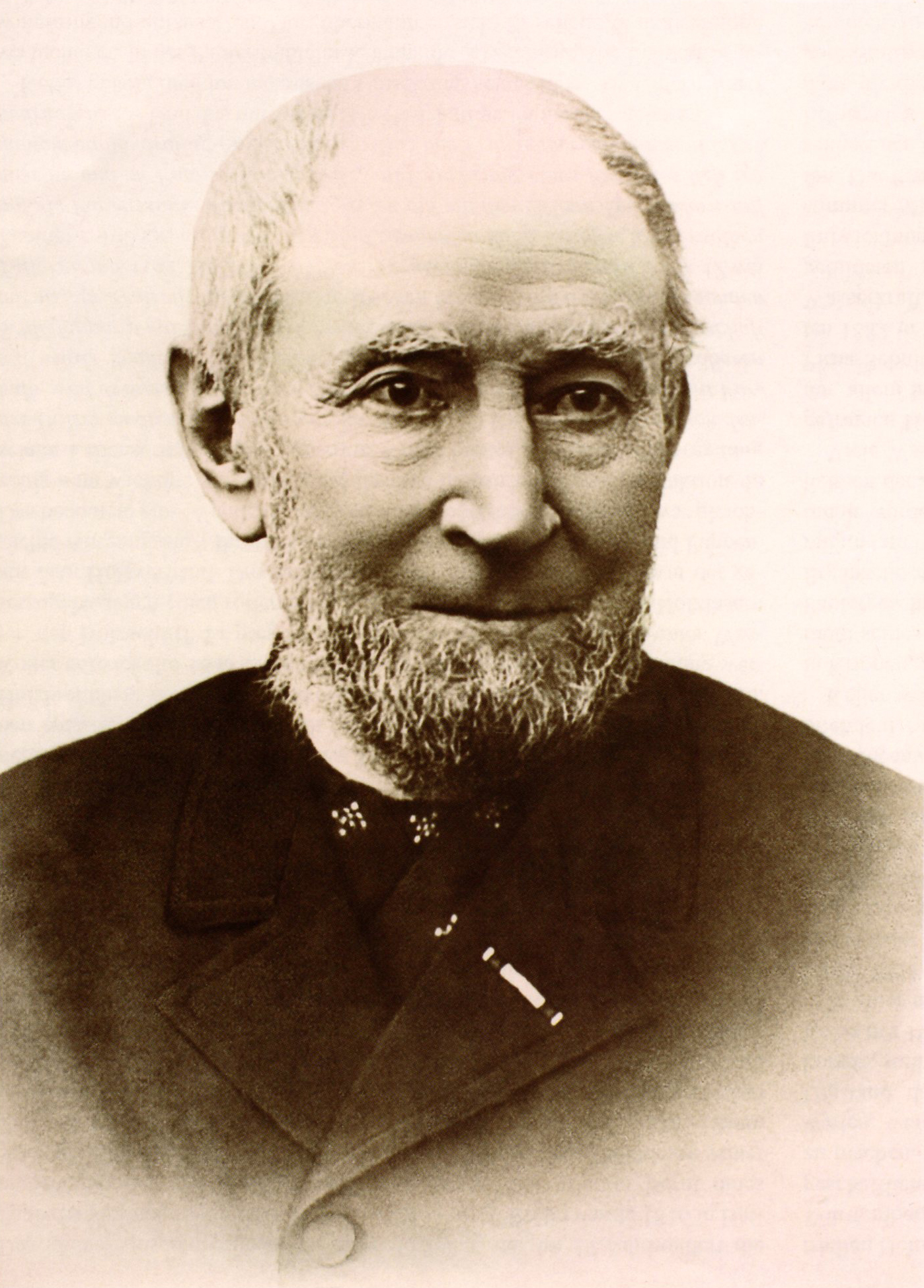
Friedrich Gottlob Keller

- Hainichen is the birthplace of Christian Fürchtegott Gellert (1715–1769), to whose memory a bronze statue was erected in the marketplace in 1865. He was an important poet of the Enlightenment.
- Friedrich Gottlob Keller (1816–1895), the inventor of the groundwood pulp technique, was born in Hainichen.

== More sons and daughters of the town ==
- Rainer Simon (born 1941), film director and screenwriter
- Konrad Zdarsa (born 1944), Bishop of the Diocese of Augsburg
