= Framo (car) =

German vehicle manufacturer

- Industry: Automotive industry
- Founded: 1923
- Defunct: 1957
- Successor: VEB Barkas-Werke Hainichen
- Headquarters: Frankenberg, Germany (1923-1934); Hainichen, Germany (1934-1957)
- Key people: Jørgen Skafte Rasmussen
- Products: Automobiles
- Number of employees: 700 (1933); 50 (1946)

Framo is a German manufacturer of trucks. It was established by Danish engineer Jørgen Skafte Rasmussen, the founder of DKW, in 1923. The company made minivans, motor tricycles and cars and was based in Saxony, Germany. Framo became the core of the Barkas minivan manufacturer in 1957.

The Framo brand was reactivated by Framo GmbH, founded in 2014, which develops and manufactures electric trucks.

== Formation ==
Framo was founded by the Danish engineer Jørgen Skafte Rasmussen and two colleagues (Paul Figura, and Richard Blau) as a components supplier in 1923. At this time, the company was called Metall-Werke Frankenberg GmbH and located in Frankenberg, Saxony. Rasmussen had earlier founded DKW, and the Framo factory was created to produce components for DKW motorcycles. Rasmussen played an important role in the establishment of the Auto Union group, and DKW is represented by one ring of the four rings of the Audi brand today.

The production of a motorized freight trike (TV 300) started in Frankenberg in 1927. The idea was to combine a motorcycle with a cargo area. The tricycles were equipped with a one-cylinder-two-stroke engine made by DKW. Framo's lightweight and affordable motorized freight trikes were popular with craftsmen and tradesmen. Based on this success, the models ZW 200, LT 200, LTH 200 and LTH 300 were developed.

== Relocation to Hainichen ==
In 1934, the company moved to Hainichen and was subsequently rebranded as FRAMO-Werke GmbH, Hainichen. Framo is a made-up word based on FRAnkenberg and MOtorenwerk (engine plant). At this point, the company was already employing 700 workers. 1934 also saw the development of compact cars. First, the tricycle Stromer FP 200 was released. Its successors Piccolo VH 200 and Piccolo VH 300 had four wheels. Overall, the cars were not a huge success. Following up on the earlier success of the motorized freight trikes, a new line of minivans with four wheels was introduced in 1938. The first model was called V 500.

== World War II ==
The production of military products and weapons began in 1943. From September 1944 until April 1945, 500 female prisoners of Hainichen concentration camp, a subcamp of Flossenbürg concentration camp, were forced to work for the Framo enterprise.

== East Germany ==
In 1945, on the orders of the occupying Soviet military administration, the factories were dismantled as part of war reparations and shipped to the Soviet Union.

The factory restarted the assembly of the pre-war-model (V 501/2) in 1949. The newly developed postwar models V 901 and V 902 entered the market in 1951. The development of varying superstructures began in 1953. Production was changed to the VEB Barkas-Werke Hainichen in 1957.

== Reformation in 2014 ==
In 2014, in Langenbernsdorf, Germany, Framo GmbH was founded, and produces electric trucks.

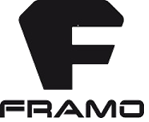
Logo of Framo GmbH, est. 2014

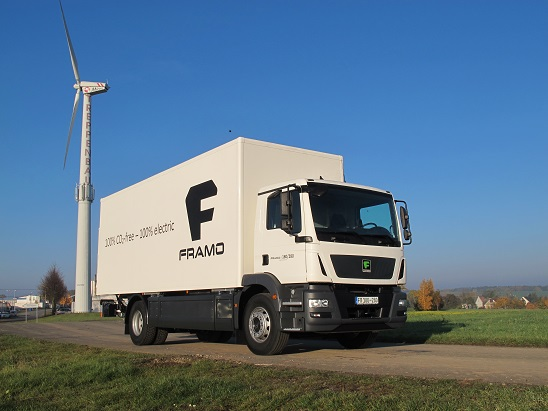
Framo E180...

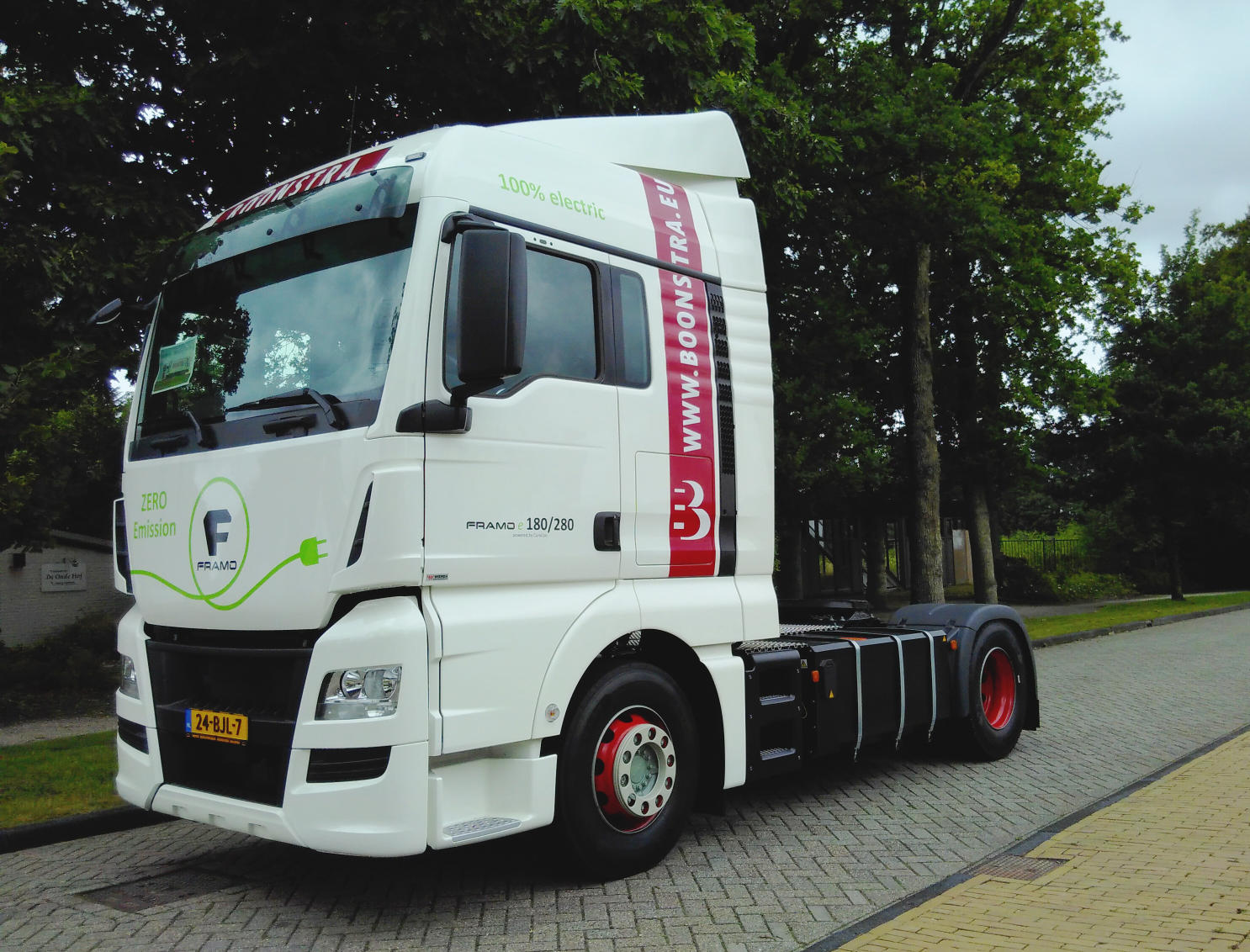
...and also

== Framo museum ==
A museum dedicated to the brands Framo and Barkas was opened in Frankenberg, Saxony in 1993. As of 2007, eighteen cars, motorized tricycles and minivans are on display.

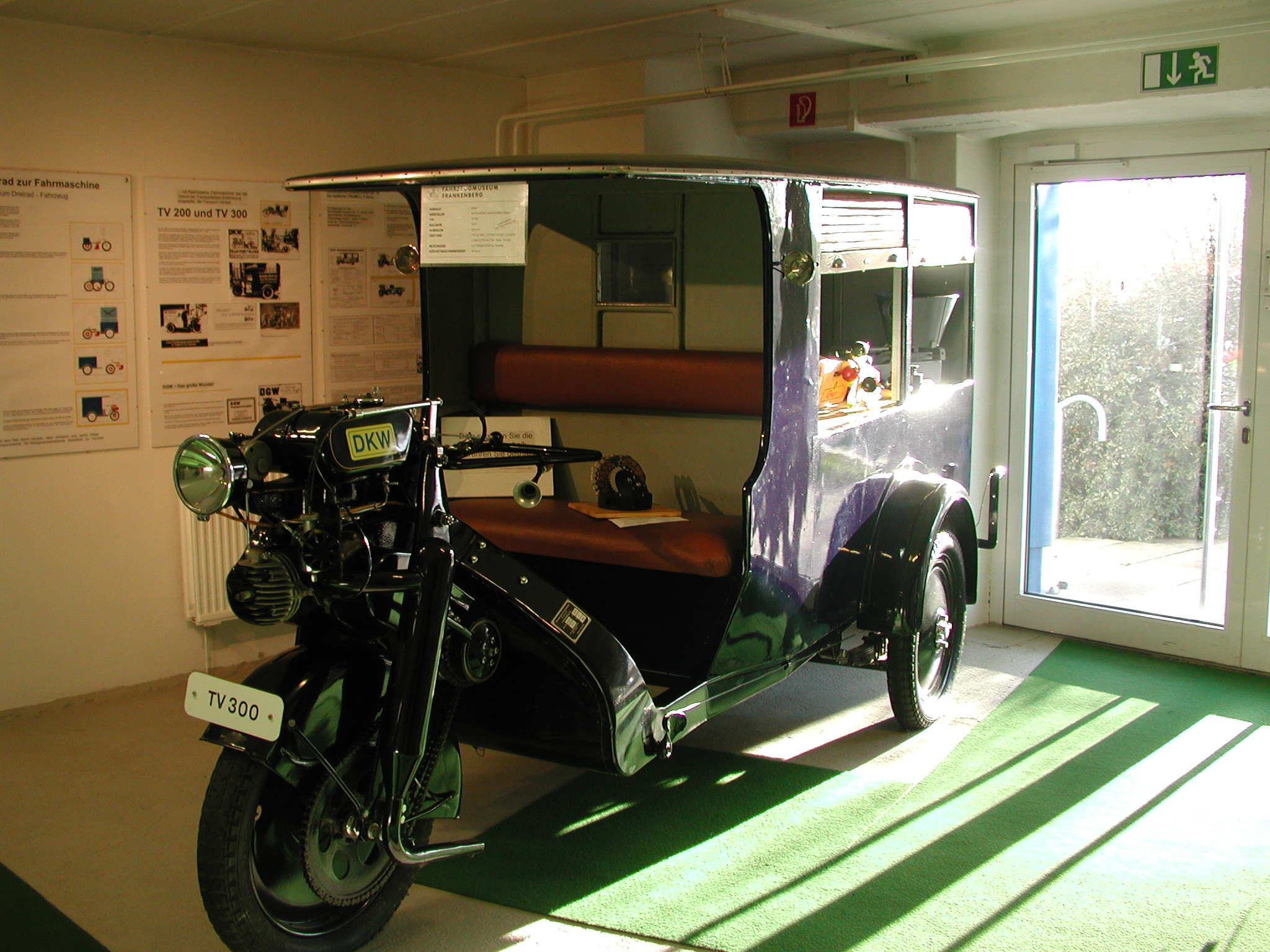
Framo TV300

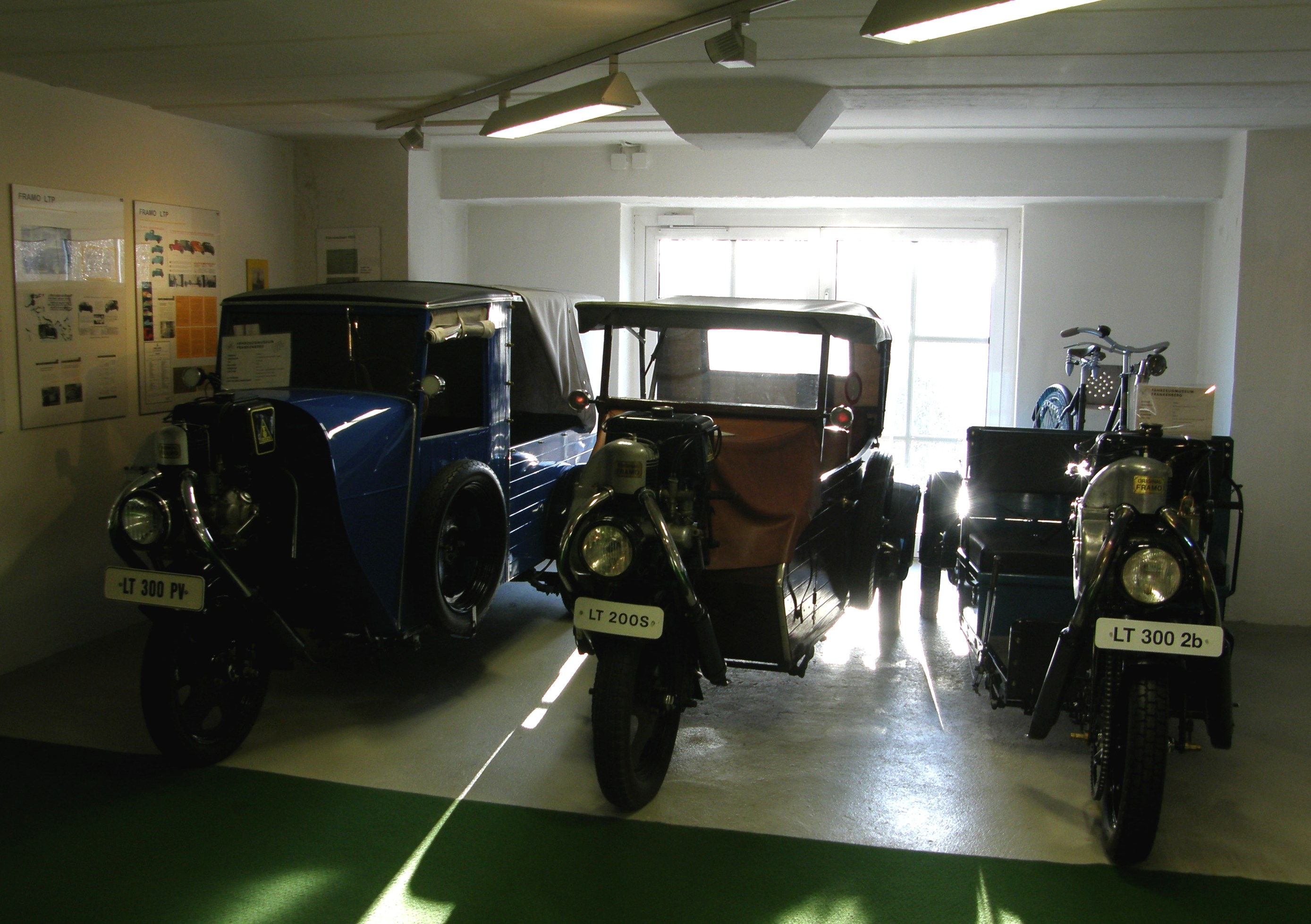
Framo LT300PV, LT200S and LT3002b

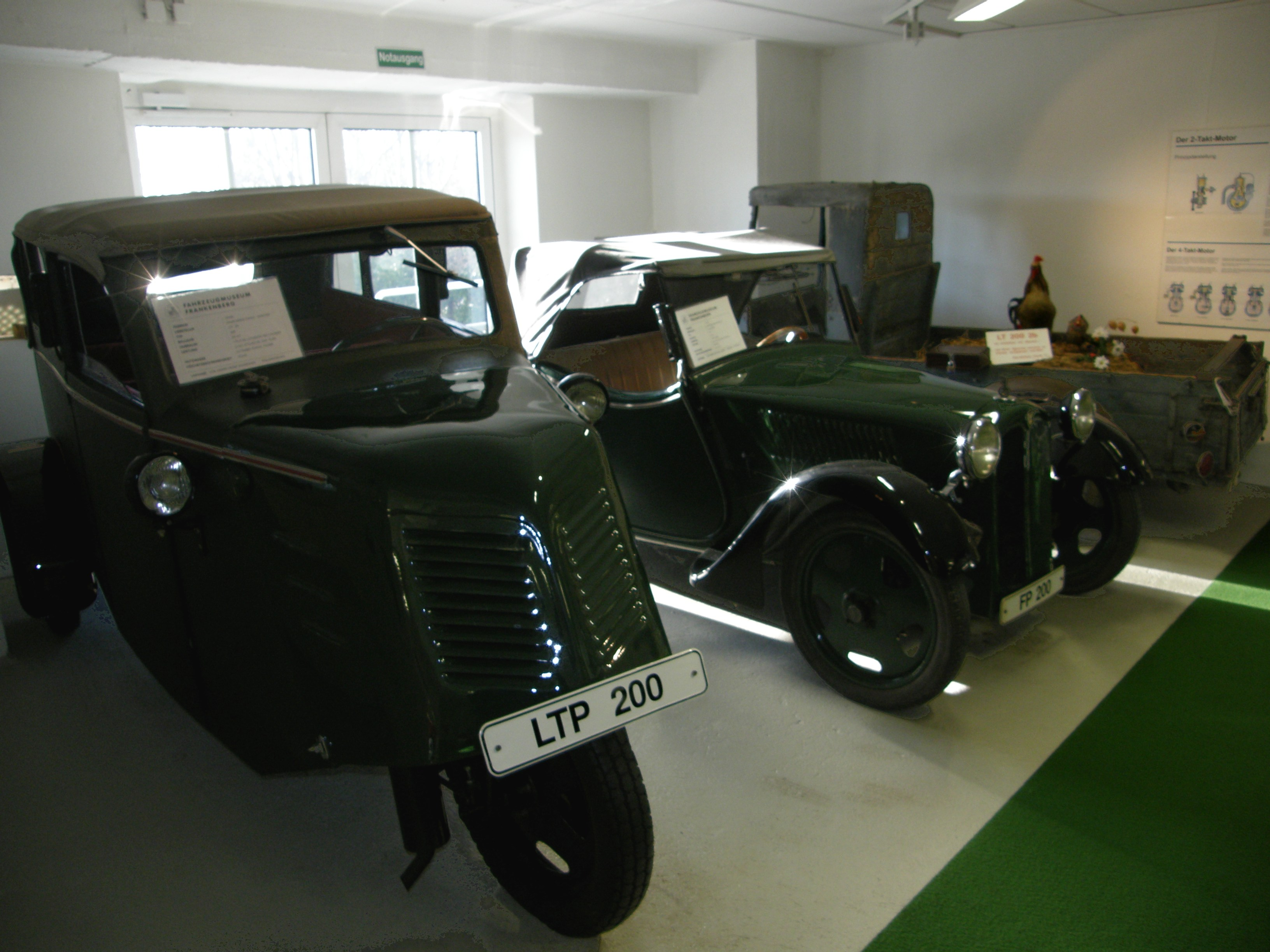
Framo LTP200 and FP200
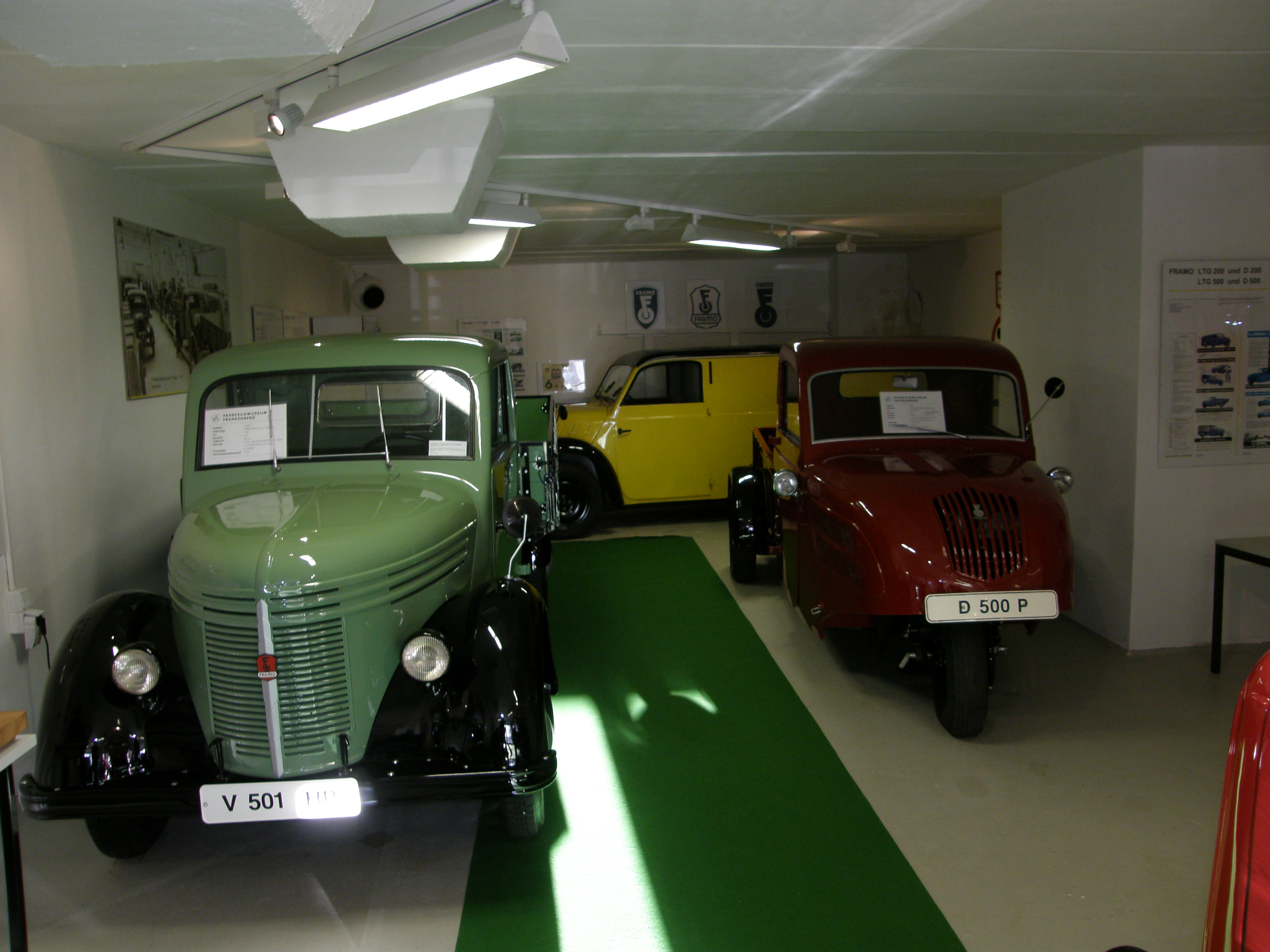
Framo D500P, V501 and V901

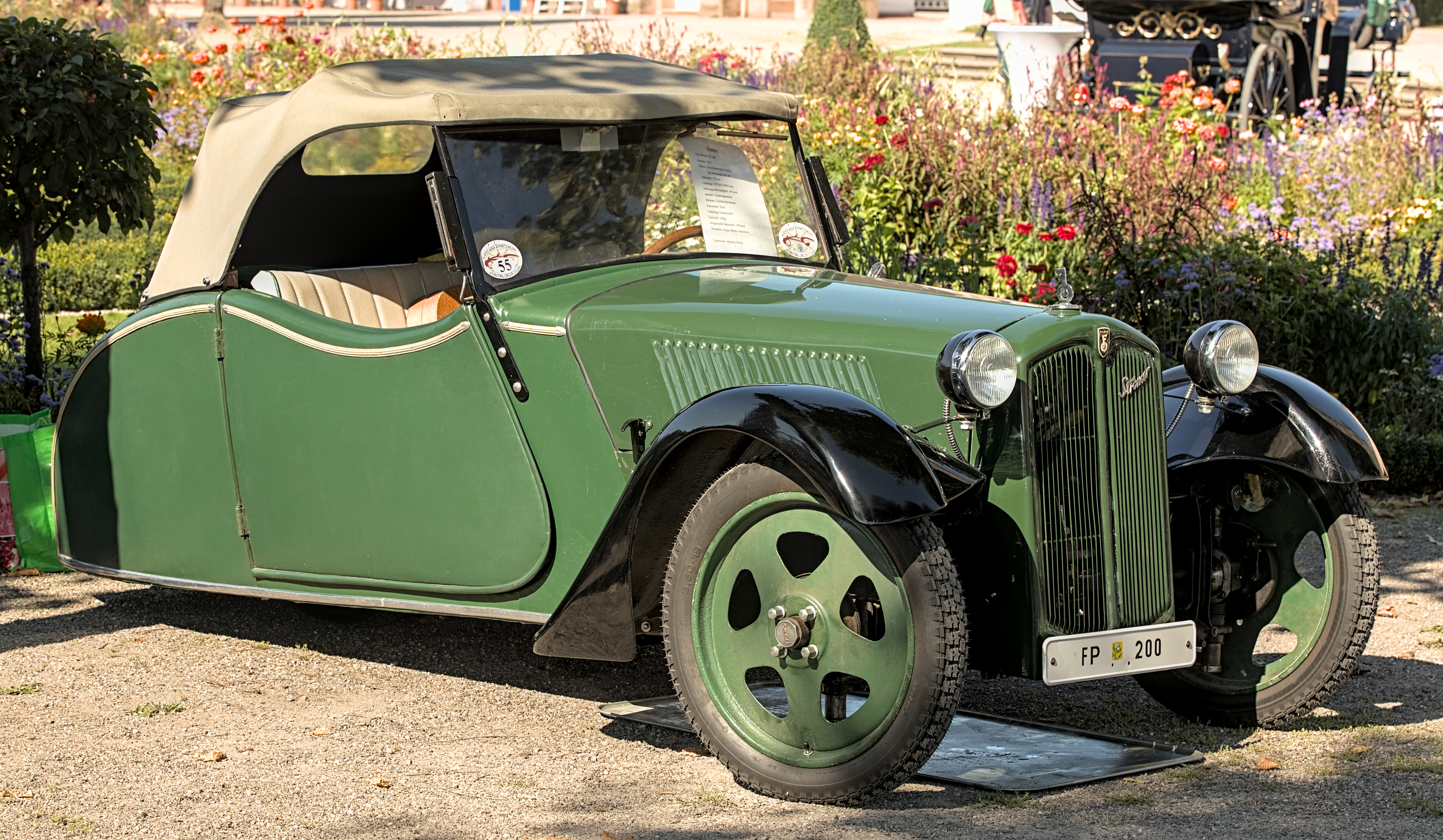
Framo Stromer

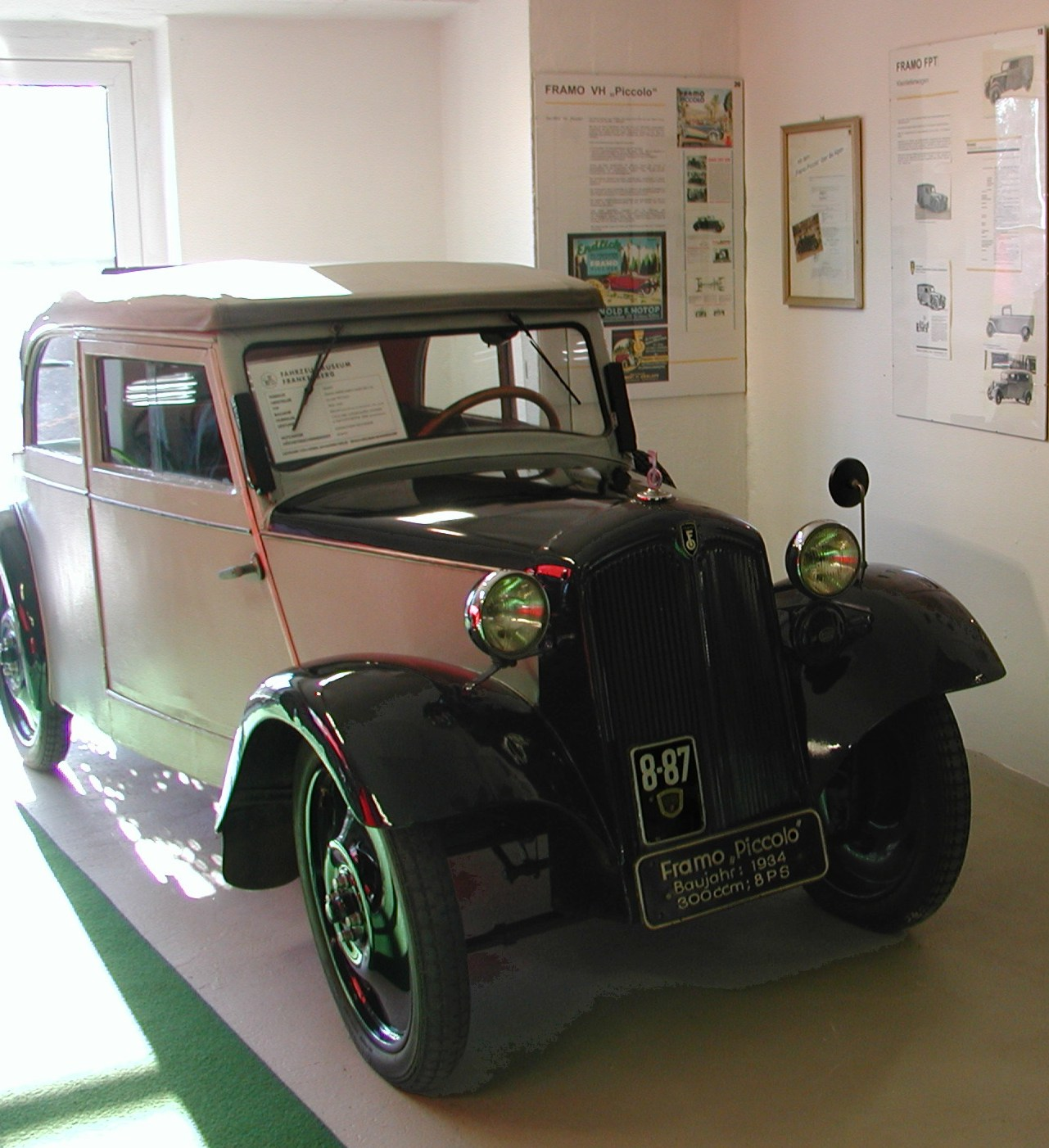
Framo Piccolo

== See also ==
- List of German cars
