= Jørgen Skafte Rasmussen =

Danish engineer and industrialist (1878–1964)

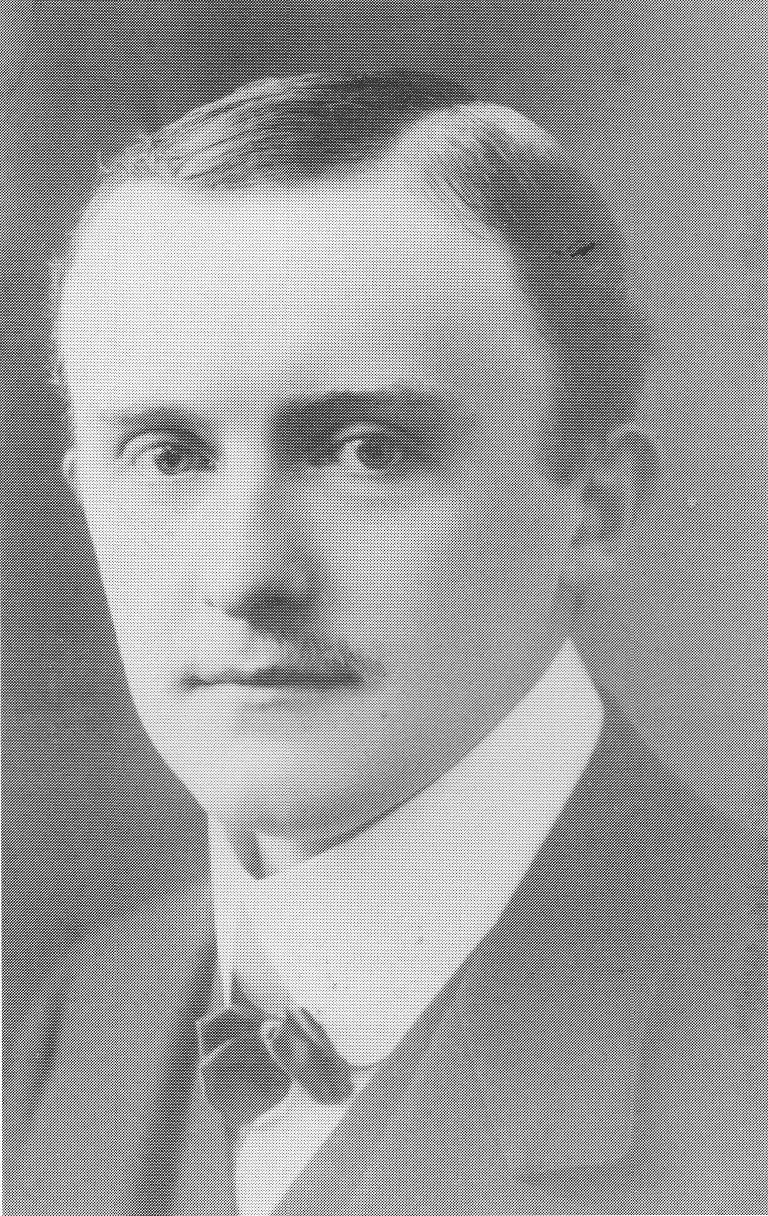
- Rasmussen in 1906
- Born: 30 July 1878; Nakskov, Denmark
- Died: 12 August 1964 (aged 86); Copenhagen, Denmark
- Occupations: Engineer and industrialist
- Known for: DKW, Auto Union
- Spouse: Theresie Liebe
- Children: Ilse, Hans, Ove and Arne

Jørgen Skafte Rasmussen (30 July 1878 – 12 August 1964) was a Danish engineer and industrialist who was one of the co-founders of Auto Union, the company that became Audi.

== Life ==
The son of a shipmaster who died when Rasmussen was still a young child, he attended middle school in Nakskov and in 1894 began an apprenticeship in Copenhagen. His mother died when he was 19, he then moved to Nykøbing where he continued his training employed by a local engine maker.

In 1898 Rasmussen moved to Germany in order to take classes in mechanical and electrical engineering at the Hochschule Mittweida university of applied sciences in Saxony. However, he was relegated two years later due to inadequate academic achievements and continued his studies at the newly established University of Applied Sciences of Zwickau where he took his exams in 1902. One year later he registered his first utility model (Gebrauchsmuster) on a turning tool in Zwickau.

Rasmussen established the DKW motorcycle manufacturing factory Zschopauer Motorenwerke in 1921 and later automobile Framo. Rasmussen acquired a majority interest in Audi Automobilwerke in 1928, which four years later became Auto Union AG with the merger of Zschopauer Motorenwerke, Audi and others.

The Wall Street crash of 1929 and the following Great Depression hit Rasmussen's businesses hard, as demand for motor-bikes and passenger cars slumped. In 1930 the Saxony Regional Bank, which had financed Rasmussen's business expansion in the 1920s, installed Richard Bruhn (1886 – 1964) on the board of Audi and there followed a brutal pruning and rationalization of the various auto-businesses that Rasmussen had accumulated. The outcome was the founding of Auto Union in Summer 1932 with just four component businesses, being Audi, DKW, Horch and the car producing piece of Wanderer. The Auto Union group rapidly grew to become Germany's second auto producer, behind only Opel in terms of passenger car market share. After World War II, DKW moved to West Germany, with the original factory becoming MZ.

Rasmussen remained on the board until 1934 when he was removed following "differences" with fellow board members. He then left Zschopau and purchased an estate at Sacrow which today has become a district in Potsdam, and where he lived with his family till 1945. In 1945 he joined the flight from the Soviet army, relocating to Flensburg, and in 1947 he returned to Denmark.

From 1947 he lived in Hareskovby, where in the 1950s he built motor-bikes under the DISA name. After his 75th birthday he and his wife moved to Copenhagen.

== See also ==
- Auto Union
- August Horch
