= Hainichen concentration camp =

Concentration camp in Nazi Germany

Coordinates: 50°58′11″N 13°7′31″E

Hainichen concentration camp is a concentration camp at Öderanstrasse in Hainichen, Saxony, formed on April 4, 1933, by order of Amtshauptmann Döbeln. Ortsgruppenleiter Georg "Zuff" Ziegler was the commandant and Friedrich Zill served as his deputy. The guards consisted of SA-Sturm 5/139, later supplemented by SA-Sturmbann II/148 from Colditz. Despite the nomenclature, Hainichen was an early concentration camp for leftist detainees. Its population fluctuated from an initial 50 prisoners to 144 by April 12, then to nearly three hundred before its dissolution on June 13, 1933.

Hainichen prisoners were divided into three arrest categories. These categories depended upon the degree of suspected involvement with leftist political parties. They ranged from non-members, who were supposed to be immediately released, party members, who faced detention for an indefinite period, to party officials, who were considered to be the most serious cases. Although the SA occupied a community center, the prisoners were made to sleep on a garbage heap. After Hainichen's closure, the detainees were dispatched to early concentration camps at Colditz Castle and Sachsenburg. No additional information has emerged so far about Hainichen, for which further research is needed.

== Notes ==
This article incorporates text from the United States Holocaust Memorial Museum, and has been released under the GFDL.

During World War II, a subcamp of Flossenburg concentration camp was located here, housing female prisoners working for the Framo enterprise.
