= Richard Bruhn =

Richard Karl Wilhelm Bruhn (25 June 1886 in Cismar, now administratively part of Grömitz – 8 July 1964 in Düsseldorf) was a German automobile manufacturer, entrepreneur, and member of the Nazi Party.

== Parentage ==
Bruhn was the son of a shoe maker called Heinrich Christian Emil Bruhn and his wife Karoline Ernestine Bruhn (born Glüsing).

== Early career ==
On leaving his elementary school Bruhn undertook an apprenticeship as an electrician before switching to a career in Business. In 1907 he took a clerical position in the engineering section of AEG in Bremen.

In 1910 Bruhn took charge of AEG's London commercial office. He undertook war service between 1914 and 1918, and after the war he became a student at the University of Kiel, emerging in 1921 with a doctorate in Economics.

Directly after this Bruhn took a commercial directorship with Neufeldt & Kuhnke in Kiel, and in 1927 he joined the board of directors at Junkers in Dessau. He moved again in 1929, this time to Chemnitz where he became a director at Pöge Elektricitäts-AG.

== Bruhn's move into the auto-sector ==
A move into the automotive sector came in 1930 when a regional bank, the Sächsische Staatsbank, mandated him to join the board of the “Zschopauer Motorenwerke J. S. Rasmussen” (DKW), a dynamic but structurally convoluted and financially troubled automaker in which the bank was heavily invested. Two years later, as part of a vigorous rationalisation designed to protect the future of the business, the Auto Union company was created, comprising four automobile brands that the automotive entrepreneur Jørgen Skafte Rasmussen had acquired and built up over the years. Bruhn himself was installed as chairman of the new company in 1932, which aligned with the wishes of the company's bankers but would create tensions with Rasmussen whose vision and energy had built up the businesses in the first place. Two years later, in 1934, it was Jørgen Skafte Rasmussen who resigned from the company. Bruhn stayed till 1945.

On 7 May 1945 Bruhn left Chemnitz, along with many of his fellow citizens. Although the area had been liberated by the American army, it had already been agreed between the victor powers under the Potsdam Agreement that the entire region would fall within the Soviet Occupation Zone and many Germans fled to the western part of Germany at this time. Bruhn, who had been a member of the Nazi Party during the Hitler years, was interned by the British. He underwent the denazification process. As an Auto Union director he accepted his share of the responsibility for the employment of prisoners of war at the company's plants during the war, but he was nevertheless released, and by the end of 1945 had been able to relocate to Ingolstadt in Bavaria (which was in the American occupation zone). Auto Union's small DKW-badged cars had sold well during the 1930s, and were generally too small and slow to have been commandeered by the German military during the war or by the armies of the occupying powers after it. Many pre-war DKWs survived the war and in December 1945 it was possible to create in Ingolsadt the "Central depot for Auto Union replacement parts" (“Zentraldepot für Auto Union Ersatzteile GmbH“). The longer term outlook for any form of German manufacturing industry remained at this stage unclear, and Auto Union's plant, located in the Soviet zone, was out of reach. But with financing from the Bavarian Regional government and Marshall Plan funding, it was possible to create in September 1949 a new company in West Germany called Auto Union GmbH, and based at the Ingolstadt parts depot. Richard Bruhn was the company's first boss. At this stage automobile production was established in a rented factory several hundred kilometers to the west, in Düsseldorf, but in due course it would be possible to finance and built a car plant at the new company's spacious site in Ingolstadt. The first Ingolstadt-produced Audi car would emerge from the factory, by now owned by the Volkswagen group, in 1964, the year of Bruhn's death.

On May 26, 2014, a new investigative report was issued by AUDI that condemned Bruhn for close association with Nazi leaders and extensive use of concentration camp inmates as forced labor. https://www.thelocal.de/20140526/audi-used-forced-labour-under-nazis-in-germany
