= Auto Union =

German automobile manufacturer

Auto Union AG
- The first (1932–1948) version of the Auto Union four ring logo, which survives as the logo of Audi
- Industry: Automotive industry, Motor racing
- Predecessor: Zschopauer Motorenwerke J. S. Rasmussen (DKW); Audiwerke AG Zwickau; Horchwerke AG Zwickau; Wanderer plant, Siegmar (now part of Chemnitz)
- Founded: Auto Union AG; Chemnitz, Germany (29 June 1932; 94 years ago); Auto Union GmbH; Ingolstadt, Germany (3 September 1949; 77 years ago)
- Defunct: 1 January 1969 (merger with NSU to Audi NSU Auto Union AG)
- Fate: acquired by Volkswagen, merged with NSU to create modern day Audi company.
- Successor: Auto Union GmbH (1949–1968); Audi NSU Auto Union AG (1969–1985); Audi AG (1985–present)
- Headquarters: Zschopau (1932–1936); Chemnitz (1936–1948); Ingolstadt (1949–1968); Neckarsulm/Audi NSU (1969–1985); Ingolstadt/Audi AG (1985–present)
- Products: Automobiles

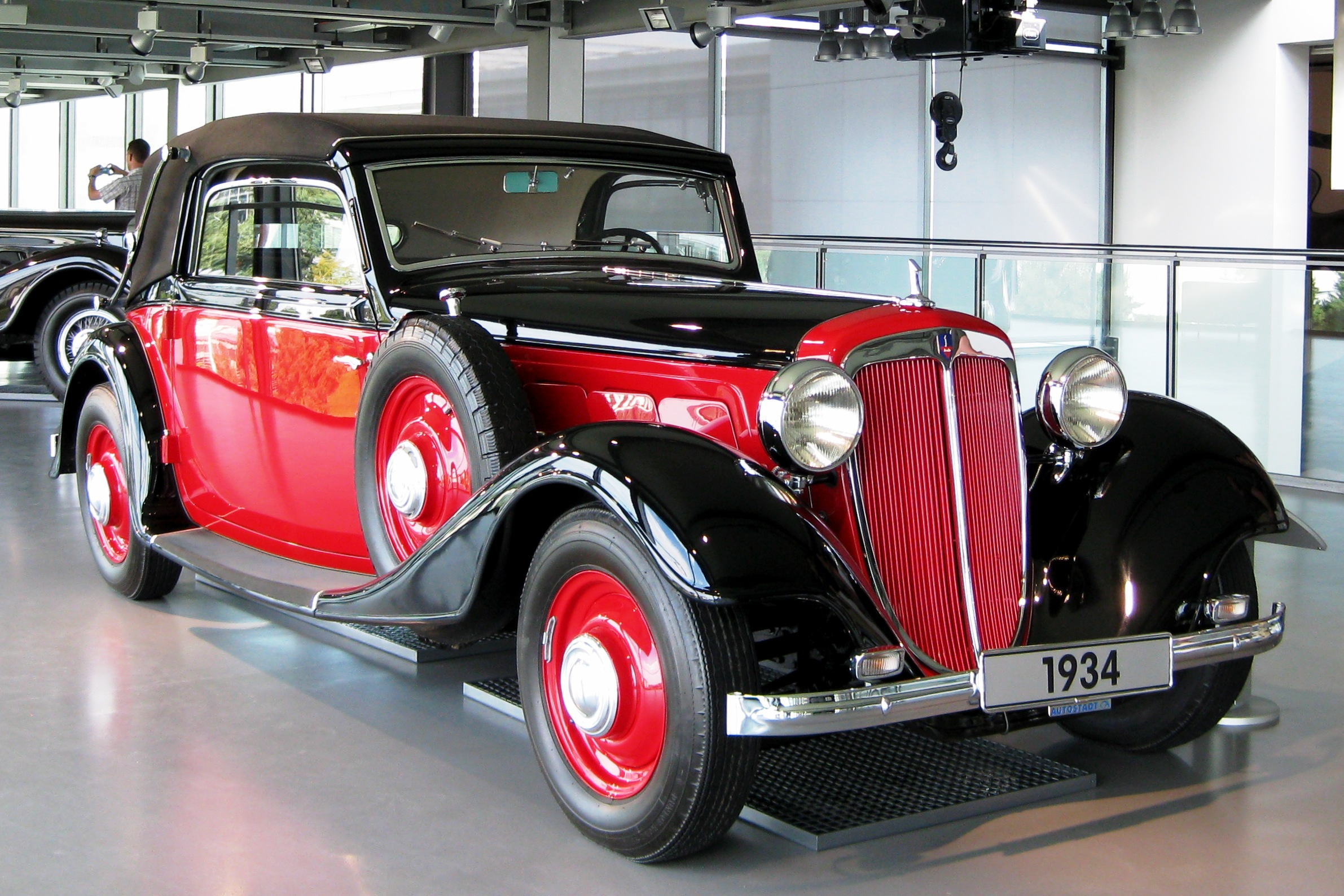
Audi

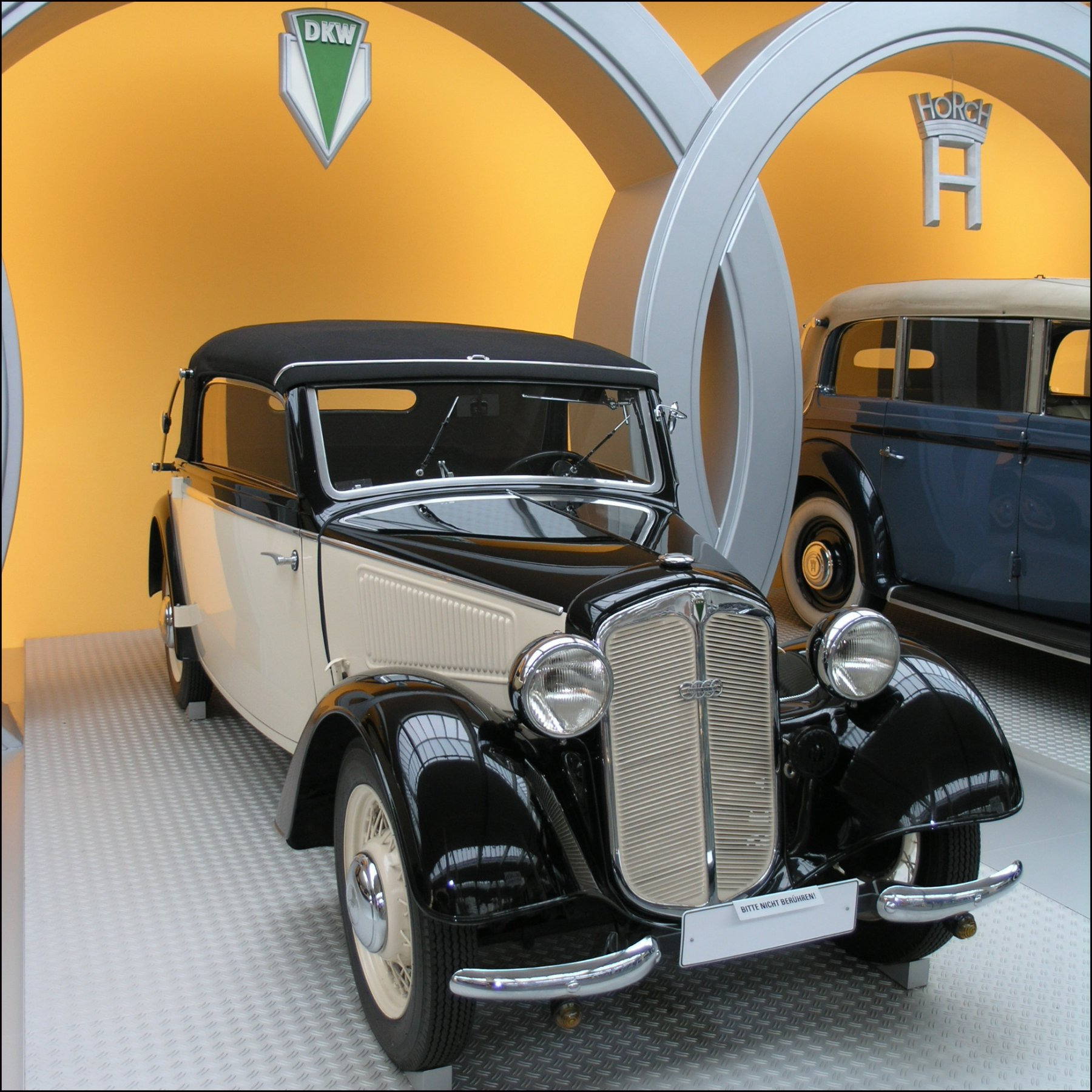
DKW

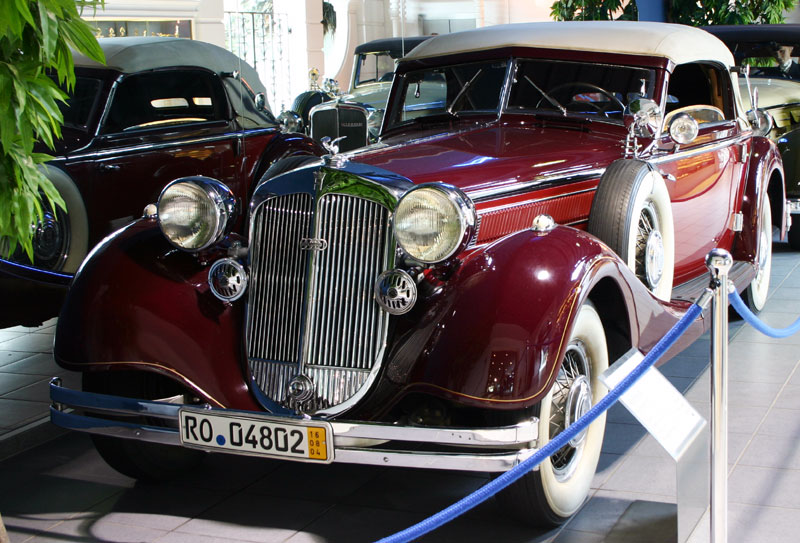
Horch

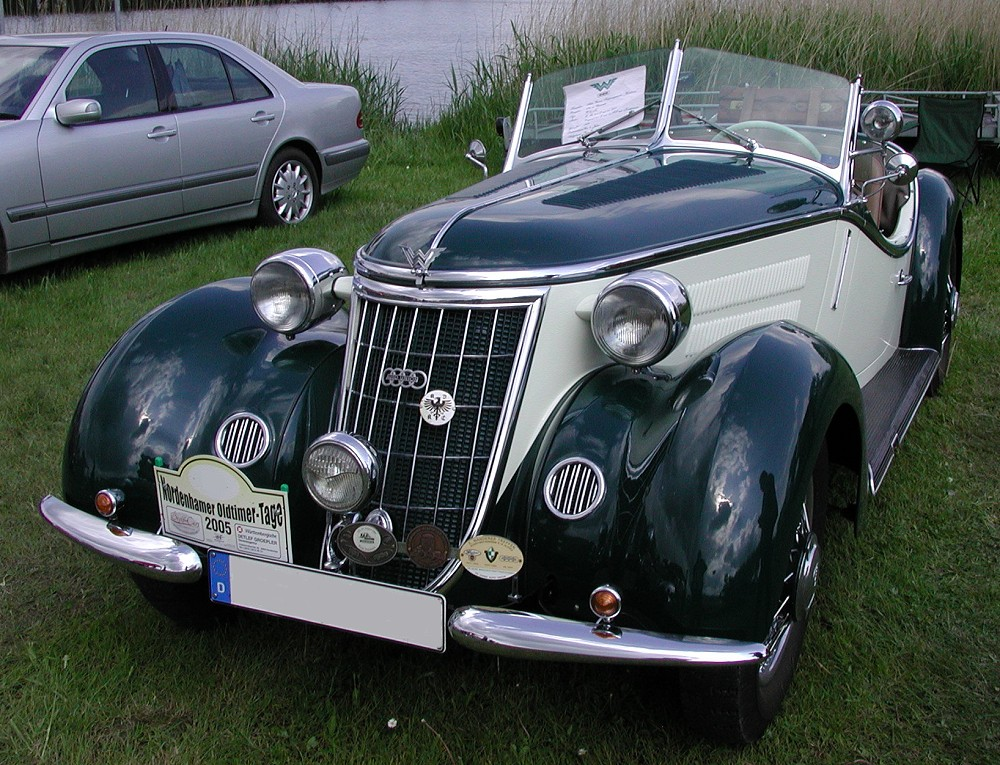
Wanderer

Auto Union AG was an amalgamation of four German automobile manufacturers, founded in 1932 and established in 1936 in Chemnitz, Saxony. It is the immediate predecessor of Audi as it is known today.

As well as acting as an umbrella firm for its four constituent brands (Audi, Horch, DKW, Wanderer), Auto Union is widely known for its racing team (Auto Union Rennabteilung, based at Horch works in Zwickau/Saxony). The Silver Arrows of the two German teams (Mercedes-Benz and Auto Union) dominated not only Grand Prix motor racing from 1934 onwards but set records that would take decades to beat, such as the fastest speed ever attained on a public road (at 432.7 km/h (268.9 mph), a record lasting until 2017. After being reduced to near ruin in the aftermath of World War II, Auto Union was re-founded in Ingolstadt, Bavaria, in 1949, ultimately evolving into the modern day Audi company following its takeover by Volkswagen in 1964 and later merger with NSU Motorenwerke in 1969.

The current corporate entity which bears the Auto Union name, Auto Union GmbH, was founded in 1985 and is a wholly owned subsidiary of Audi AG; its purpose is to act as owner of Auto Union's historical trademarks and intellectual property, as well as managing Audi's heritage operations. The company's distinctive logo of four interlocking rings to represent the original four members of the Auto Union survives as the logo of Audi.

== Formation ==
Auto Union was formed in Germany in 1932 merging:

- Zschopauer Motorenwerke J. S. Rasmussen (brand DKW – steam-driven car) founded by Danish engineer Jørgen Skafte Rasmussen in 1916, it branched out into motorcycles, and then front-drive two-stroke cars built at Audi works in Zwickau since 1931.
- Horch – founded 1904 by August Horch in Zwickau. It built cars starting from straight-twin engines to luxury models with V8- and V12 engines.
- Audi – because of disputes with the CFO, August Horch in 1909 left his namesake enterprise and founded Audi across town, building inline-four-, six- and eight-cylinder-engined cars. In 1928 Audi became a subsidiary of Zschopauer Motorenwerke.
- Wanderer (car division only) – founded in 1911, with small four-cylinder cars and later a more luxurious straight-6 built in Siegmar (now Chemnitz)

In August 1928, Rasmussen, the owner of DKW, acquired a majority ownership of Audiwerke AG. In the same year, Rasmussen bought the remains of the US automobile manufacturer Rickenbacker, including the manufacturing equipment for eight- and six-cylinder engines. These engines were used in Audi Zwickau, Audi Imperator and Audi Dresden models. At the same time, six-cylinder and four-cylinder (licensed from Peugeot) models were manufactured.

In 1930 the Saxony Regional Bank, which had financed Rasmussen's business expansion in the 1920s, installed Richard Bruhn on the board of Audiwerke AG, and there followed a brutal pruning and rationalization of the various auto-businesses that Rasmussen had accumulated. The outcome was the founding in Summer 1932 of Auto Union AG with just four component businesses, being Zschopauer Motorenwerke with its brand DKW, Audi, Horch and the car producing piece of Wanderer, brought together under the umbrella of single shareholder company Auto Union. Although all four brands continued to sell cars under their own names and brands, the technological development became more centralized, with some Audi models employing engines by Horch or Wanderer.

== The Auto Union racing cars ==
=== Background ===
Auto Union chairman, Klaus, Baron von Oertzen, wanted a showpiece project to announce the new brand. At the 1933 Berlin Motor Show, German Chancellor Adolf Hitler announced two new programs:

- The people's car (Volks wagen): a project that became the KdF car – the "Strength through Joy" car
- A state-sponsored motor racing programme: to develop a "high speed German automotive industry," the foundation of which would be an annual sum of 500,000 ℛ︁ℳ︁

At fellow director's Adolf Rosenberger insistence, von Oertzen met with Dr. Ferdinand Porsche, who had done work for him before, and developed his own P-Wagen project racing car based on the new 750 kg (1,650 lb) formula.

German racing driver Hans Stuck Sr. had met Hitler before he became Chancellor, and not being able to gain a seat at Mercedes, accepted the invitation of Rosenberger to join him, von Oertzen, and Porsche in approaching the Chancellor. In a meeting in the Reich Chancellory, Hitler agreed with Porsche that for the glory of Germany, it would be better for two companies to develop the project, resulting in Hitler agreeing to pay £40,000 for the country's best racing car of 1934, as well as an annual stipend of 250,000 ℛ︁ℳ︁ (£20,000) each for Mercedes and Auto Union. (In time, this would climb to £250,000.) This highly annoyed Mercedes, who had already developed their Mercedes-Benz W25; nevertheless, Mercedes was gratified, its racing program having financial difficulties since 1931. It resulted in a heated exchange both on and off the racing track between the two companies until World War II.

Having garnered state funds, Auto Union bought Porsche's Hochleistungsfahrzeugbau GmbH (HFB) (High Performance Car Ltd.) and hence the P-Wagen Project for 75,000 ℛ︁ℳ︁, relocating the company to Auto Union's Horch plant at Zwickau.

=== Design ===
The Auto Union racing cars types A to D were built as Grand Prix racing cars from 1934 to 1939. They resembled the earlier Benz Tropfenwagen, also built in part by Rumpler engineers, The only Grand Prix racers to wear Auto Union's four-ringed logo, they were particularly dominant in 1936. From 1935 to 1937, Auto Union cars car won 25 races, driven by Ernst von Delius, Bernd Rosemeyer, Hans Stuck Sr., and Achille Varzi. Much has been written about the difficult handling characteristics of this car, but its tremendous power and acceleration were undeniable – a driver could induce wheelspin at over 100 mph (160 km/h).

The cars used supercharged piston engines; eventually producing almost 550 hp (410 kW; 560 PS), designed to provide optimum torque at low engine speeds. Rosemeyer would later drive one around the Nürburgring in a single gear, to prove the engine was flexible enough to do it. Unlike its rivals, it had a rear mid-engine, rear-wheel-drive layout. The fuel tank was located in the centre of the car, directly behind the driver (who would be placed well towards the front), so the car's front-rear weight distribution would remain unchanged as fuel was used – exactly the same location used in modern open-wheel racing cars, and for the same reason. The chassis tubes were initially used as water carriers from the radiator to the engine, but this was eventually abandoned after they often sprung small leaks.

=== Racing results ===
The list of drivers for the initial 1934 season was headed by Stuck; he won the German, Swiss, and Czechoslovak events, along with wins in a number of hill climbs, becoming European Mountain Champion.

In 1935, the engine had been enlarged to 5 L (305 cu in) displacement, producing 370 bhp (276 kW; 375 PS). Achille Varzi joined the team and won the Tunis Grand Prix and the Coppa Acerbo. Stuck won the Italian Grand Prix, plus his usual collection of hill-climb wins, again taking the European Mountain Championship. The new sensation, Rosemeyer, won the Czech Grand Prix.

Hans Stuck Sr. in an aerodynamic Type B in Italy

Stuck also managed to break speed records, reaching 199 mph (320 km/h) on an Italian autostrada in a closed-cockpit streamliner. Lessons learned from this streamlining were later applied to the T80 land speed record car.

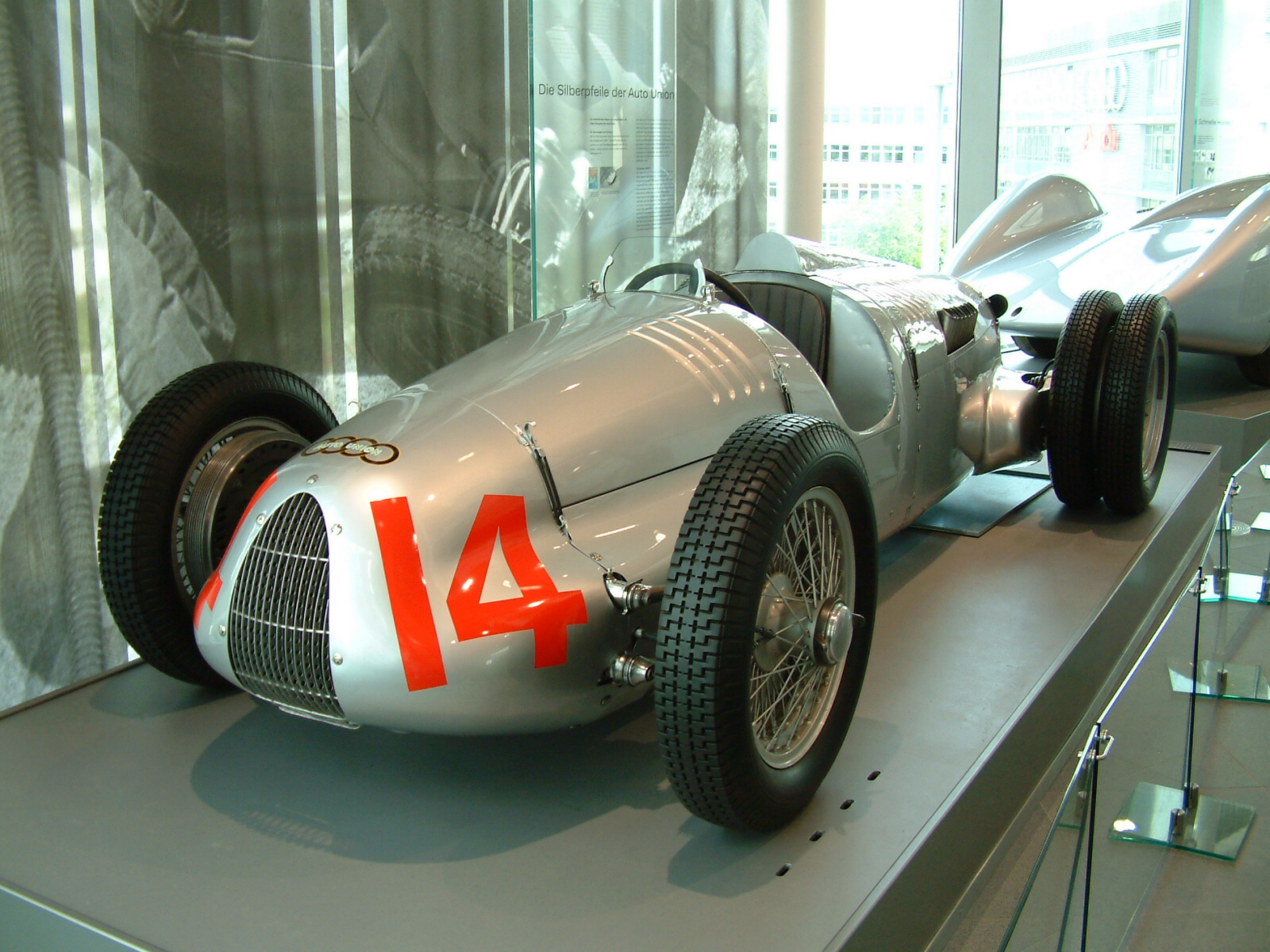
1939 Type C/D V16 hillclimb car

For 1936, the engine had grown to a full 6 L (366 cu in), and was now producing 520 bhp (388 kW; 527 PS); in the hands of Rosemeyer and his teammates, the Auto Union Type C dominated the racing world. Rosemeyer won the Eifelrennen, German, Swiss, and Italian Grands Prix, as well as the Coppa Acerbo. He was crowned European Champion (Auto Union's only win of the driver's championship), and also took the European Mountain Championship. Varzi won the Tripoli Grand Prix, while Stuck placed second in the Tripoli and German Grands Prix, and Ernst von Delius took second in the Coppa Acerbo.

In 1937, the car was basically unchanged and did surprisingly well against the new Mercedes-Benz W125, winning five races to the seven of Mercedes-Benz. Rosemeyer took the Eifel and Donington Grands Prix, the Coppa Acerbo, and the Vanderbilt Cup. Rudolf Hasse won the Belgian Grand Prix.

In addition to the new 3 L (183 cu in) formula, 1938 brought other challenges, principally the death of Rosemeyer early in the year, in an attempt on the land speed record on a German autobahn. Tazio Nuvolari joined the team, and won the Italian and Donington Grands Prix, in what was otherwise a thin year for the team, other than yet another European Mountain Championship for Stuck.

In 1939, as war clouds gathered over Europe, Nuvolari won the Yugoslavia Grand Prix in Belgrade, while Hermann P. Müller won the 1939 French Grand Prix.

== Second World War ==
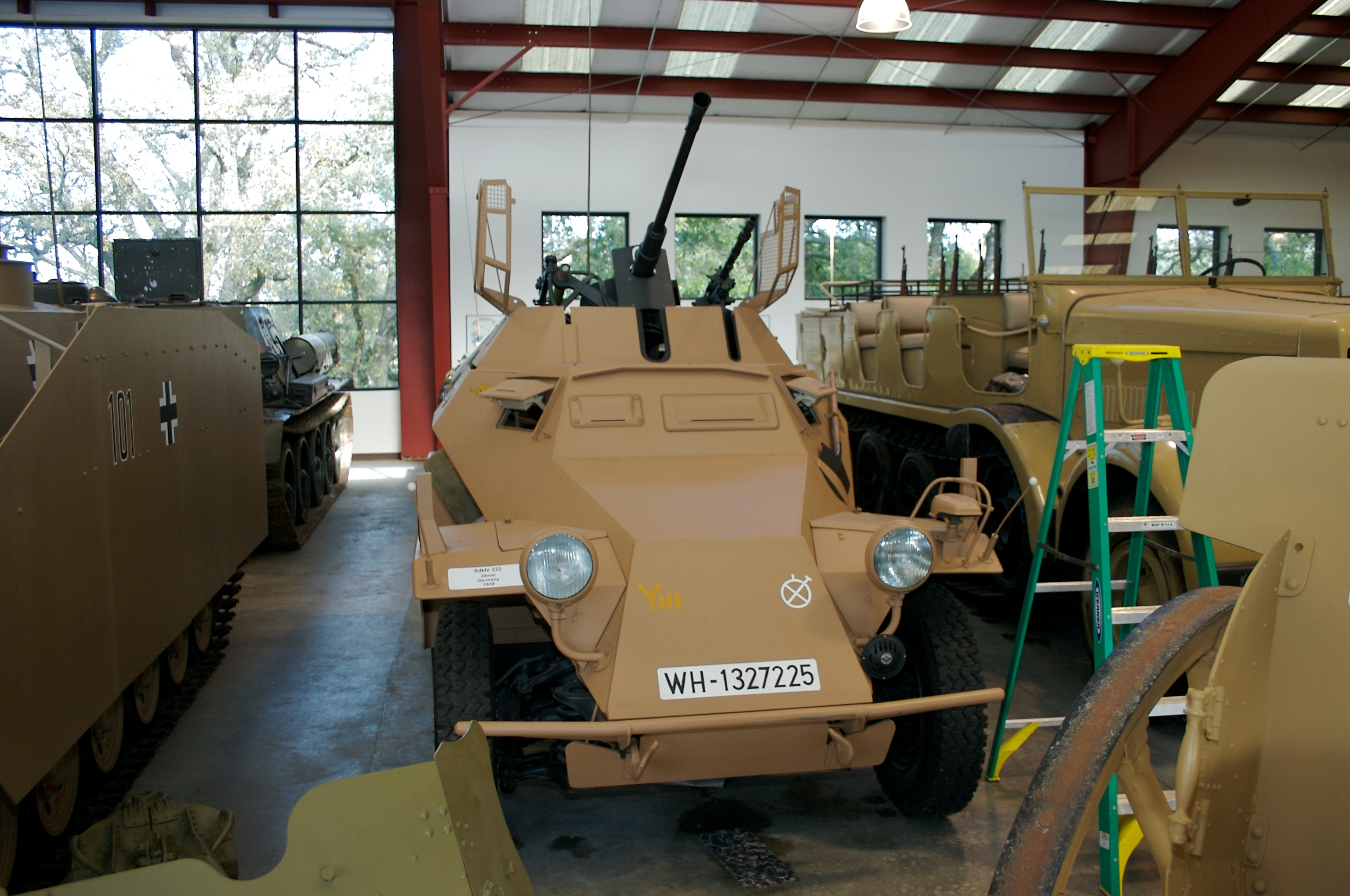
Sd.Kfz. 222

The buildup and onset of World War II encouraged the development and production of special vehicles for military purposes in the 1930s. Auto Union became an important supplier of vehicles to Germany's armed forces. Following the outbreak of war, civilian production was interrupted in May 1940. After this, the company produced exclusively for military purposes.

For the production of Junkers aircraft engine under license, Auto Union founded in 1935 the subsidiary "Mitteldeutsche Motorenwerke" (Central German Motor Works) at Taucha, northeast of Leipzig.

During World War II, Auto Union/Horch supplied the chassis for the Sd.Kfz. 222 armored car. Powered by an 90 PS (66 kW; 89 hp) Horch V8 engine, it reached a top speed of 50 mph (80 km/h) on the road. The all-wheel drive Kfz. 11, or Horch/Wanderer Type 901, was used as a medium transport vehicle to shuttle German military officials. Horch works also produced the AWD heavy transport vehicle Type 801 (both named Einheits-PKW der Wehrmacht).

From the beginning of 1944, Auto Union plants (Horch and Audi plant at Zwickau, Mitteldeutsche Motorenwerke and Siegmar/Wanderer plant at Siegmar-Schönau) were heavily bombed and severely damaged. The U.S. Army occupied Zwickau on 17 April 1945 near the end of WWII. After withdrawal of the U.S. Army on 30 June from Zwickau, all Saxon plants of Auto Union were occupied by the Red Army.

The company exploited slave labor at Leitmeritz concentration camp. According to a 2014 report commissioned by the company, Auto Union bore "moral responsibility" for the 4,500 deaths that occurred at Leitmeritz.

== East Germany ==
Postwar, the Saxon plants of Auto Union were located in the Soviet-occupied zone of communist East Germany.

In 1945, on the orders of the Soviet Military Administration in Germany, the factories were dismantled as war reparations, while the racing cars found stored in a colliery were returned to Moscow for reverse engineering. Following this, Auto Union AG assets were liquidated without compensation. On 17 August 1948, Auto Union AG of Chemnitz was deleted from the commercial register. The remains of Horch and Audi plants of Zwickau became the VEB (for "People Owned Enterprise") Automobilwerk Zwickau, or AWZ; (Automobile Factory Zwickau).

The former Audi factory in Zwickau, now under East German control, restarted assembly of the pre-war models in 1949. Those models were renamed IFA F8 and IFA F9 and were similar to the new West German DKW versions. In time, a lawsuit compelled the East Germans to cease using the DKW brand. The site became the home of VEB Sachsenring in the 1950s, which manufactured the infamous Trabant. After the reunification of Germany in 1990, Volkswagen took a controlling interest in the old VEB Sachsenring organization, creating the new subsidiary Volkswagen Sashsen GmbH, operating initially out of what were the historic Auto Union sites in Zwickau and Chemnitz, which were both eventually rebuilt – in 1993 a new factory was constructed in Zwickau in nearby Mosel, which in 2021 became the centre of production for the Volkswagen Group MEB platform vehicles – notably the Audi Q4 e-tron – making it the first Audi to be manufactured at Zwickau since the pre-war era.

Audi also established the August Horch Museum in 2004 within the surviving factory buildings in Zwickau which dated back to the historic Horch and Audi companies of the 1900s. The museum charts the early histories of Audi, Horch and Auto Union leading up to the company's reestablishment in Ingolstadt after WW2.

== New Auto Union ==
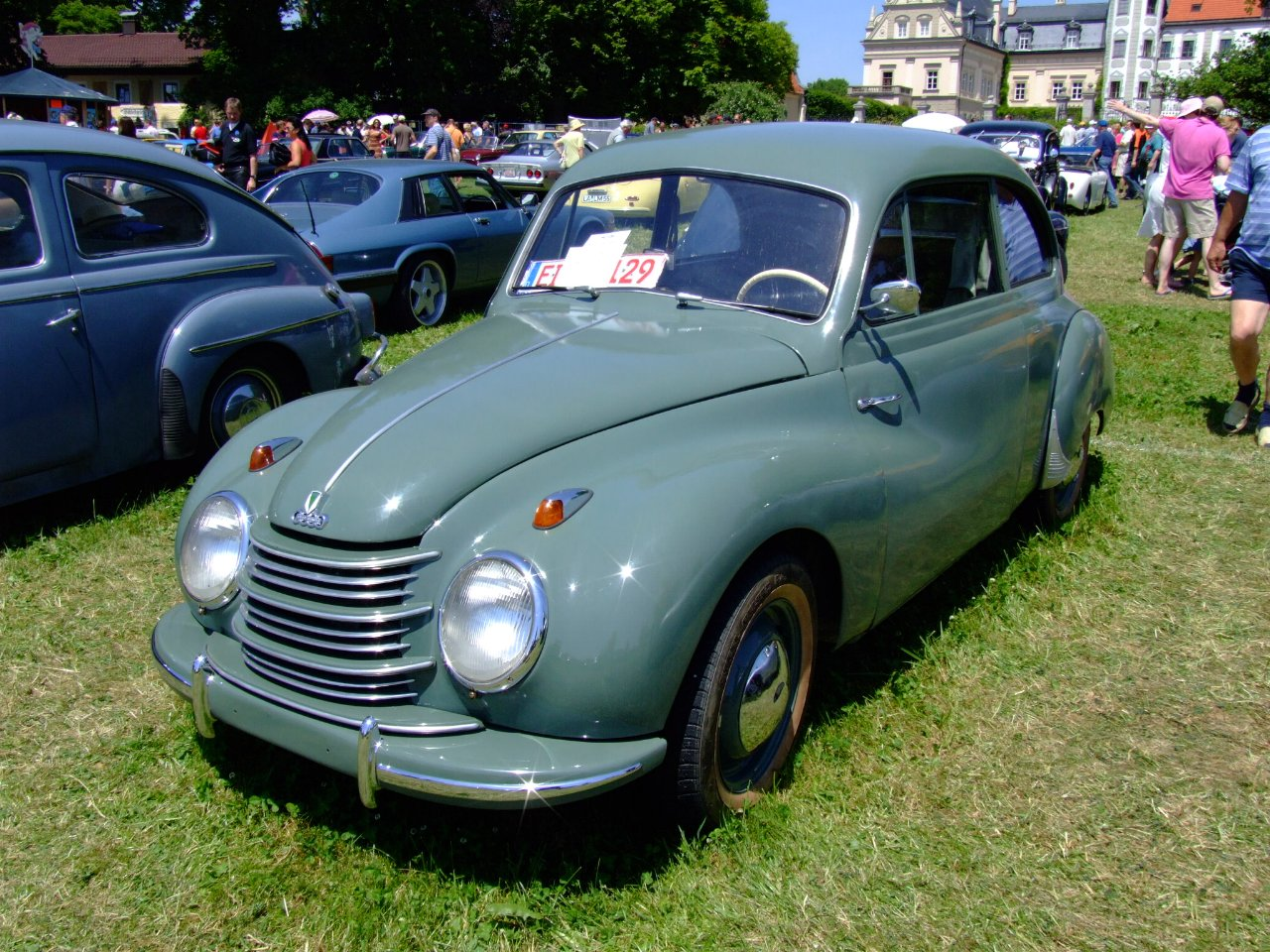
DKW F89

With the Red Army quickly advancing on Zwickau immediately after the war, and faced with the prospect of trying to salvage what was left of the company, Auto Union's executives had no option but to flee and re-establish the company on the Western side of a now partitioned Germany. Thus a new Auto Union company was launched in Ingolstadt, Bavaria, with loans from the Bavarian state government and Marshall Plan aid.

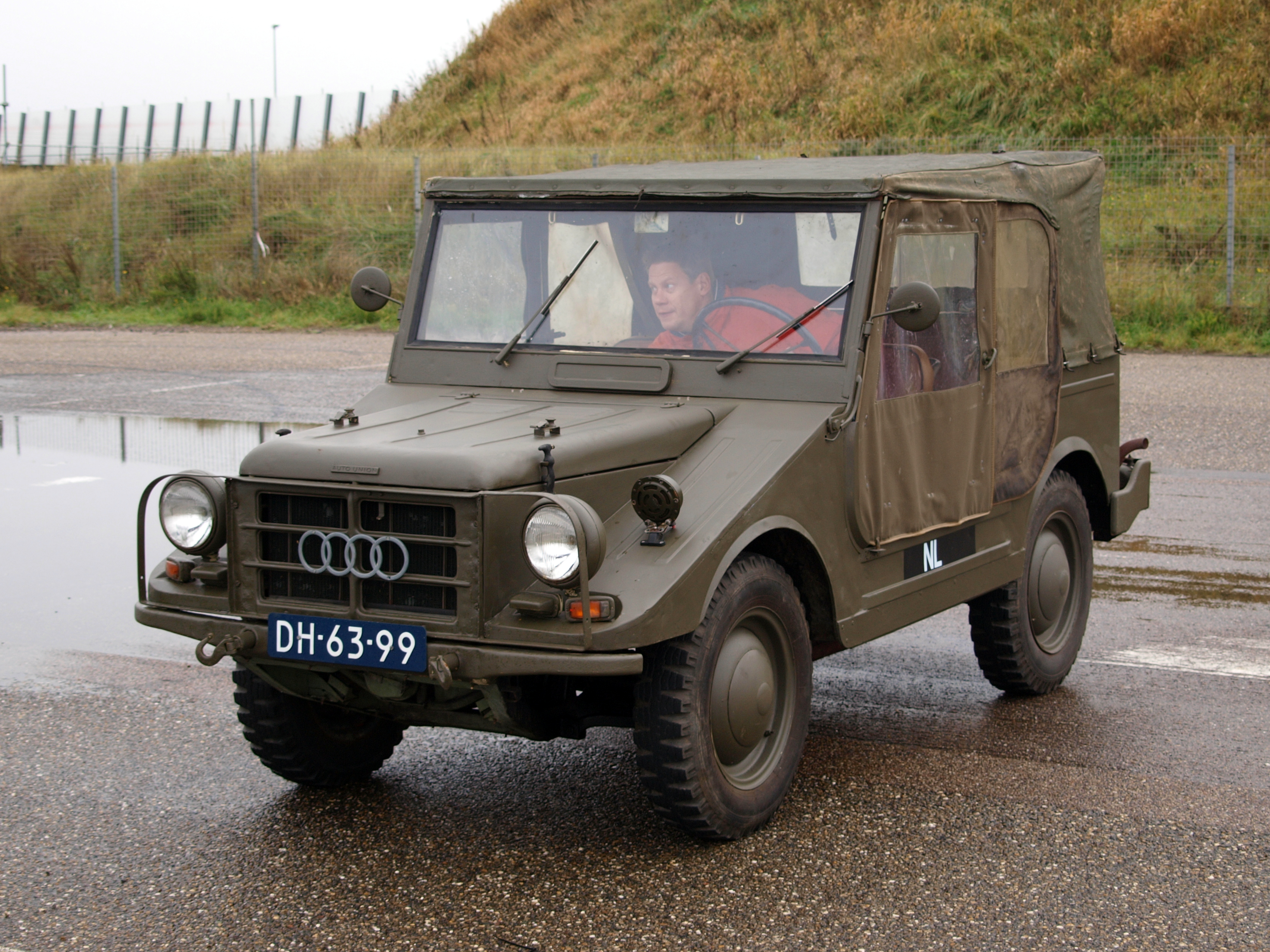
1964 Auto Union / DKW Munga.

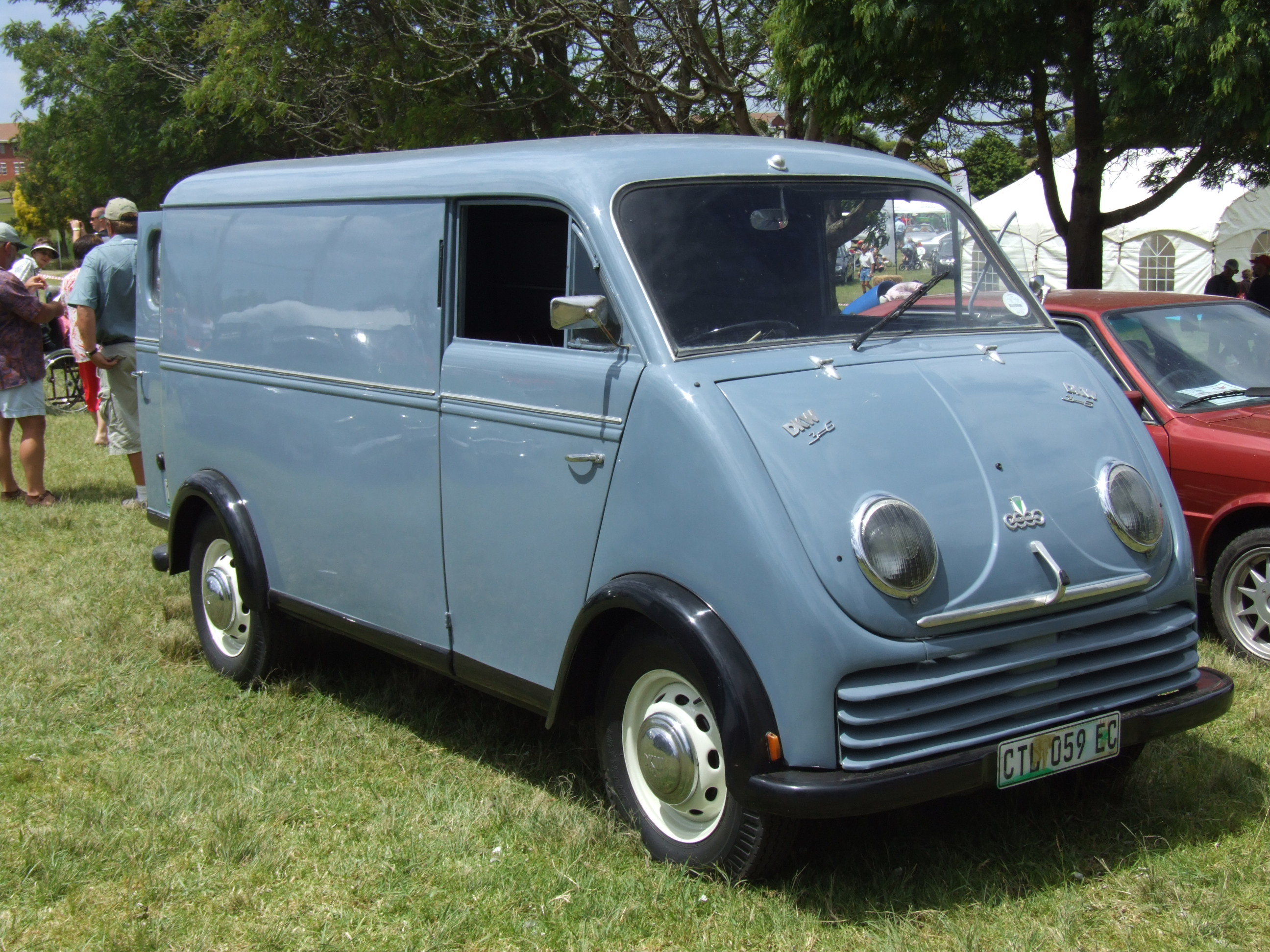
DKW F800/3 Schnellaster in South Africa

The reformed company Auto Union GmbH was launched on 3 September 1949. The Ingolstadt facility had been run purely as a spare parts operation since 1945, but eventually the directors found the funding to restart production – initially in a converted granary building in the town. With West Germany still in the early stages of rebuilding its economy after the war, the demand for cheap transport meant that only the DKW brand would survive into the postwar era. The luxury focused Audi and Horch brands were placed into dormancy, while Wanderer had been the property of its original parent firm. Auto Union therefore continued DKW's tradition of producing affordable front-wheel drive vehicles with two-stroke engines. This included production of the small but sturdy DKW RT 125 W motorcycle and a delivery van known as DKW Schnellaster. Many employees of the Saxony factories in Zwickau (Audi and Horch factories), Chemnitz (Siegmar plant, former Wanderer) and Zschopau (DKW Motorcycle factory) came to Ingolstadt and restarted the production.

In 1950, after a former Rheinmetall-Borsig factory in Düsseldorf-Derendorf was established as a second assembly facility, the company's first postwar car went into production: the DKW Meisterklasse F 89 P, available as a sedan/saloon, a station wagon and the four-seater convertible built by Karmann. The F 89 were based on the DKW F8 (motor) and the DKW F9 (coachwork) pre-war constructions.

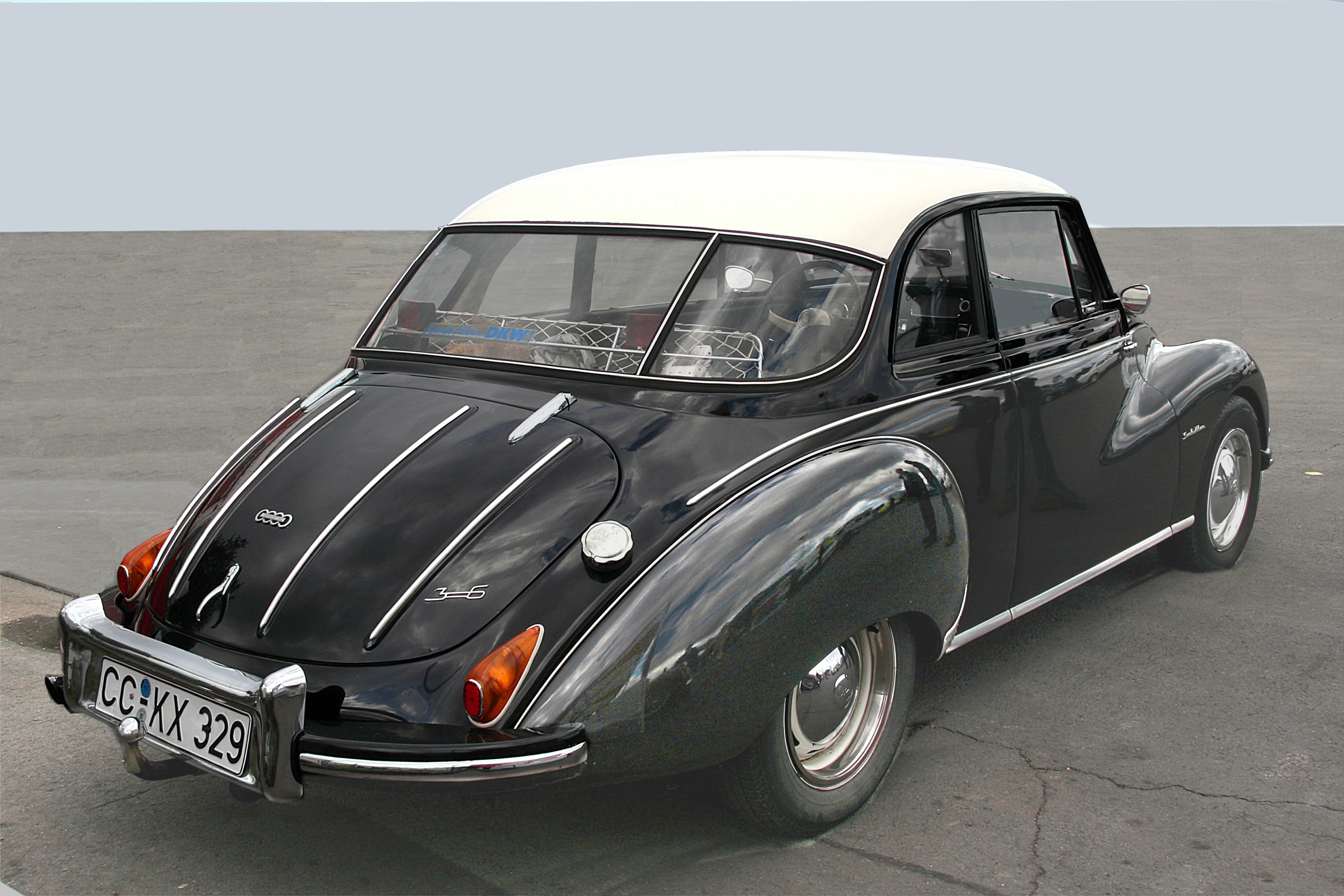
1956 DKW 3=6 F93 Sonderklasse, built in Düsseldorf.

In March 1953, the DKW 3=6 'Sonderklasse was launched at the Frankfurt Motor Show. This car proved exceptionally successful in motorsport and was built in Düsseldorf. The F91 version was soon superseded by the F93 in 1955, and soon joined by the four door F94 and station wagon Universal F94U in 1956 and 1957 respectively.

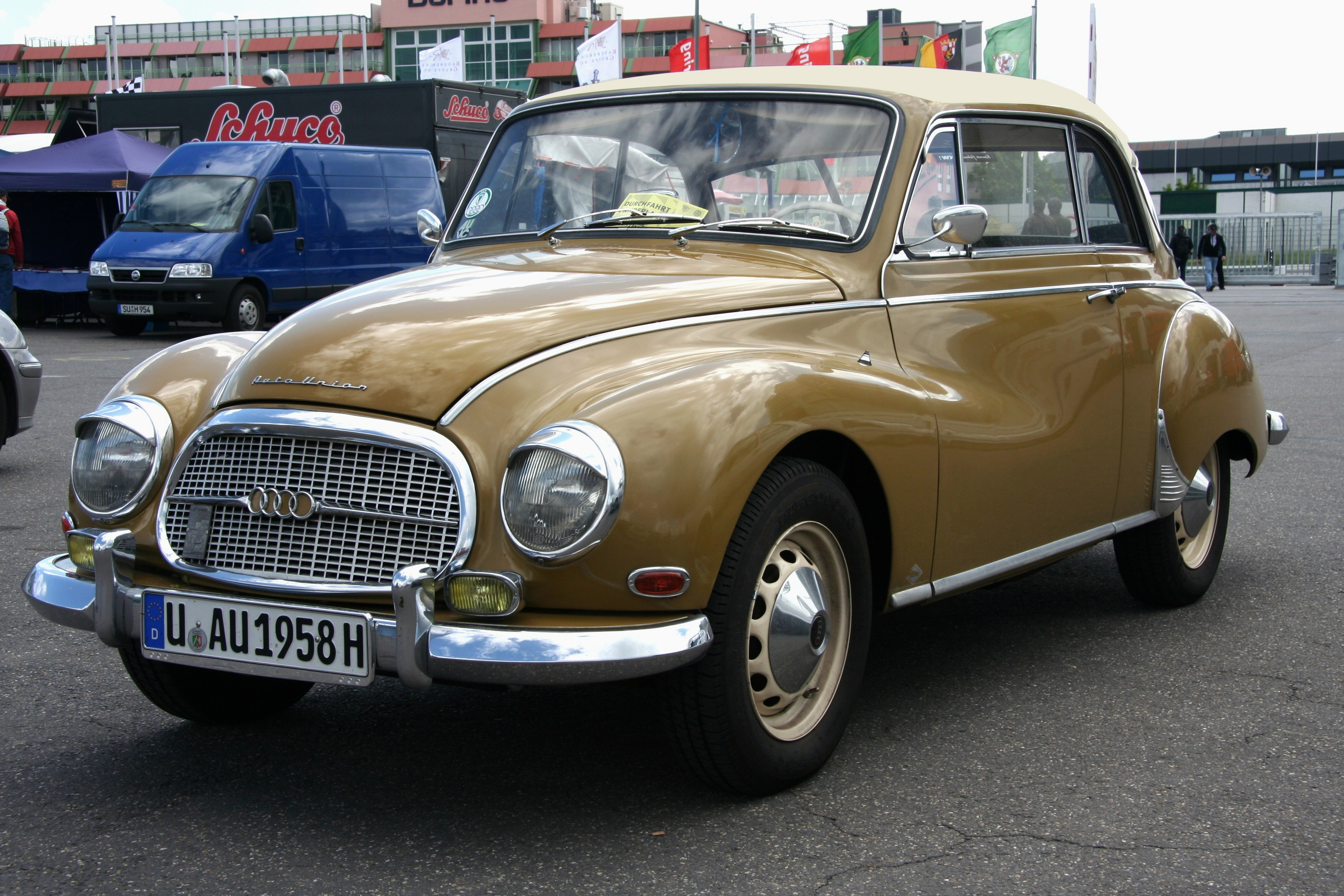
Auto Union 1000

From 1956 to 1968, about 46,750 DKW Munga light four-wheel drive military vehicles could be produced, mostly for the German and other militaries.

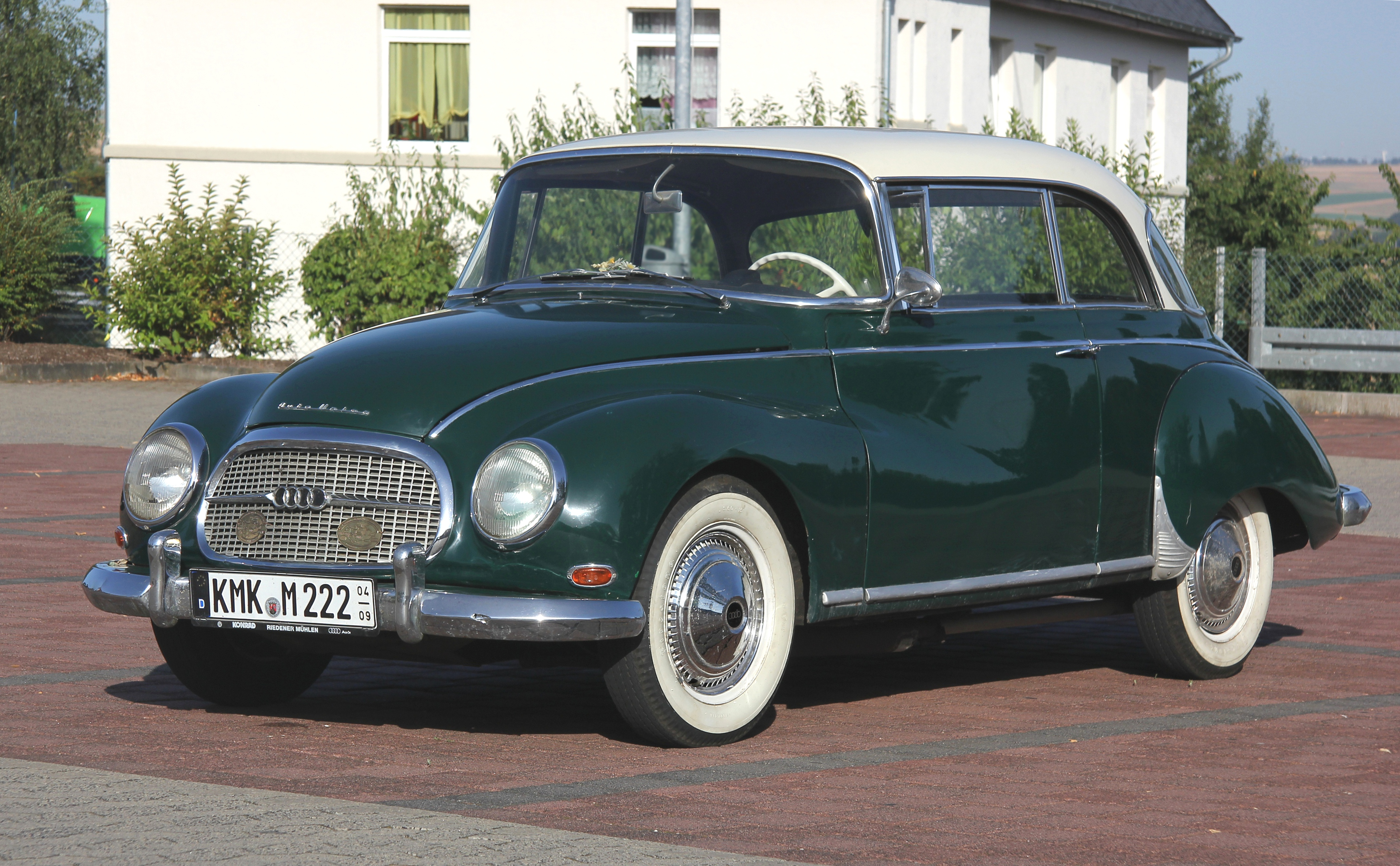
1960 Auto Union 1000S Coupe

In response to pressure from Friedrich Flick, then its largest single shareholder, Daimler-Benz acquired 87% of Auto Union in April 1958, taking complete control in the following year. In 1958 it saw the return of the Auto Union brand, represented by the Auto Union 1000, a small saloon which enjoyed sporting success. At the same time the 1000 Sp, a coupé, was produced for Auto Union by the coachbuilder Baur at Stuttgart. Under Daimler-Benz ownership the company invested heavily in the Ingolstadt plant. Car production at Düsseldorf was ended, and the plant became the centre of production for Mercedes-Benz commercial vehicles like the Mercedes-Benz L 319 – a role which it continues to the present day. The DKW and Mercedes brands were able to establish a greater presence in the North American market by an agreement with the Studebaker-Packard Corporation in 1956 which through 1964 was the only distributor in the United States. Because of SPC's large network of dealers, the Auto Union and Mercedes-Benz brands were able to expand much faster in the US markets. Many dealers today can trace their origin back to being Studebaker-Packard dealerships.

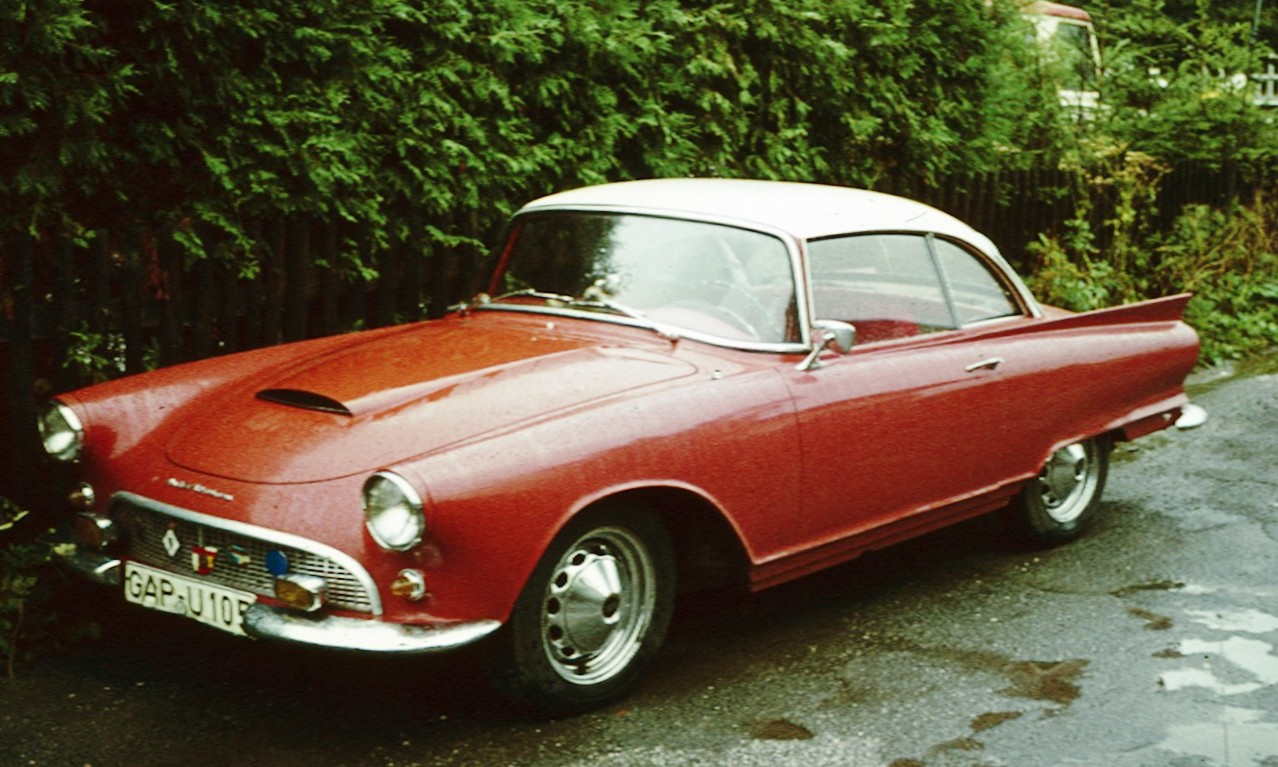
Auto Union 1000 Sp 1958 – 1965

However, as prosperity began to return to West Germany, and as West German products gained valuable currency through export to the rest of Europe and North America, Daimler became increasingly worried that Auto Union's only market for its two-stroke products, without massive investment, would be impoverished East Germany. Two-stroke engines became less popular towards the middle of the 1960s as customers were more attracted to the more refined four-stroke engines. They began selling shares, which with the agreed help of the West German Government, were acquired by Volkswagenwerk AG.

In 1964, Volkswagen acquired the factory in Ingolstadt and the trademark rights of Auto Union, with the exception of the dormant Horch brand which Daimler-Benz retained. A programme that Daimler had initiated at Auto Union created a range of cars that would subsequently provide the basis for Volkswagen's line of front-wheel-drive models, such as the Audi 80 and Volkswagen Passat. At the time a new model, internally designated F103, was under development. This was based on the last DKW model, the DKW F102, with a four-stroke engine implanted and some front and rear styling changes. Volkswagen abandoned the DKW brand because of association with two-stroke engines, effectively leaving Volkswagen with the Audi brand. The new model was launched in September 1965 as simply the "Audi." The name was a model designation rather than the manufacturer, which was still officially Auto Union. As more models were later added to the Audi range, this model was renamed Audi 72.

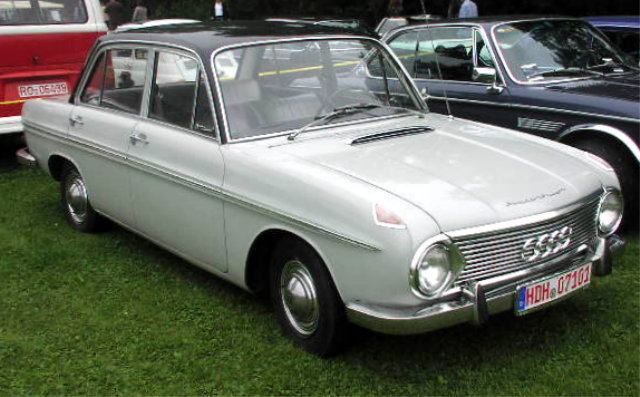
Auto Union DKW F102

In 1969, Auto Union merged with NSU Motorenwerke AG, based in Neckarsulm, near Stuttgart. In the 1950s, NSU had been the world's largest manufacturer of motorcycles, but had moved on to produce small cars like the NSU Prinz, the TT and TTS versions of which are still popular as vintage race cars. NSU then focused on new rotary engines based on the ideas of Felix Wankel. In 1967, the new NSU Ro 80 was a space-age car, well ahead of its time in technical details such as aerodynamics, light weight, and safety but teething problems with the rotary engines put an end to the independence of NSU. The mid-sized car NSU had been working on, the K70, was intended to slot between the rear-engined Prinz models and the futuristic NSU Ro 80. However, Volkswagen took the K70 for its own range, spelling the end of NSU as a separate brand.

After being merged with Neckarsulm car maker NSU, the official name became Audi NSU Auto Union AG, which was simply shortened to Audi AG in 1985, ending both the Auto Union and NSU brands. The company's headquarters returned to Ingolstadt; at the same time Audi formed the new companies Auto Union GmbH, and NSU GmbH as wholly owned subsidiaries whose function was to own and protect the historical trademarks and intellectual property of both Auto Union and NSU.

In May 2009, Porsche gained majority control of Volkswagen Group and proposed a merger of the two companies. In August 2009, Volkswagen AG's supervisory board signed the agreement to create an integrated Auto group with Porsche led by Volkswagen. Volkswagen will initially take a 42% stake in Porsche AG by the end of 2009, and see the family shareholders selling the automotive trading business of Porsche Holding Salsburg to Volkswagen. Rumors began to appear in the press the name Auto Union would be revived for the new group holding company.

=== Logo ===
The trademark symbol of Auto Union (and present-day Audi), the four overlapping rings, symbolized the four marques forming Auto Union: Audi, DKW, Horch, and Wanderer.

There is also a version of the logo that uses both overlapping and interlocking rings.

== Tribute ==
Auto Union was tributed at the 1999 Monterey Historic Automobile Races.

== See also ==
- List of German cars
