= Mercedes-Benz in motorsport =

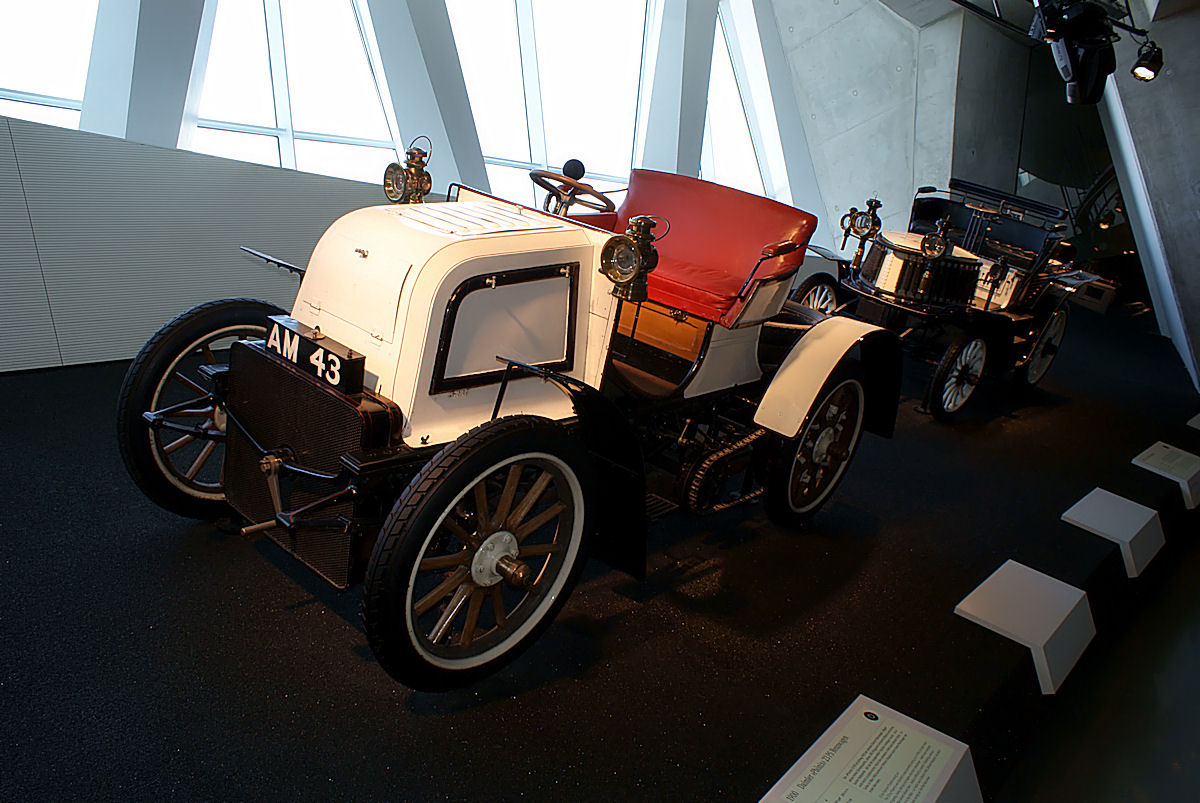
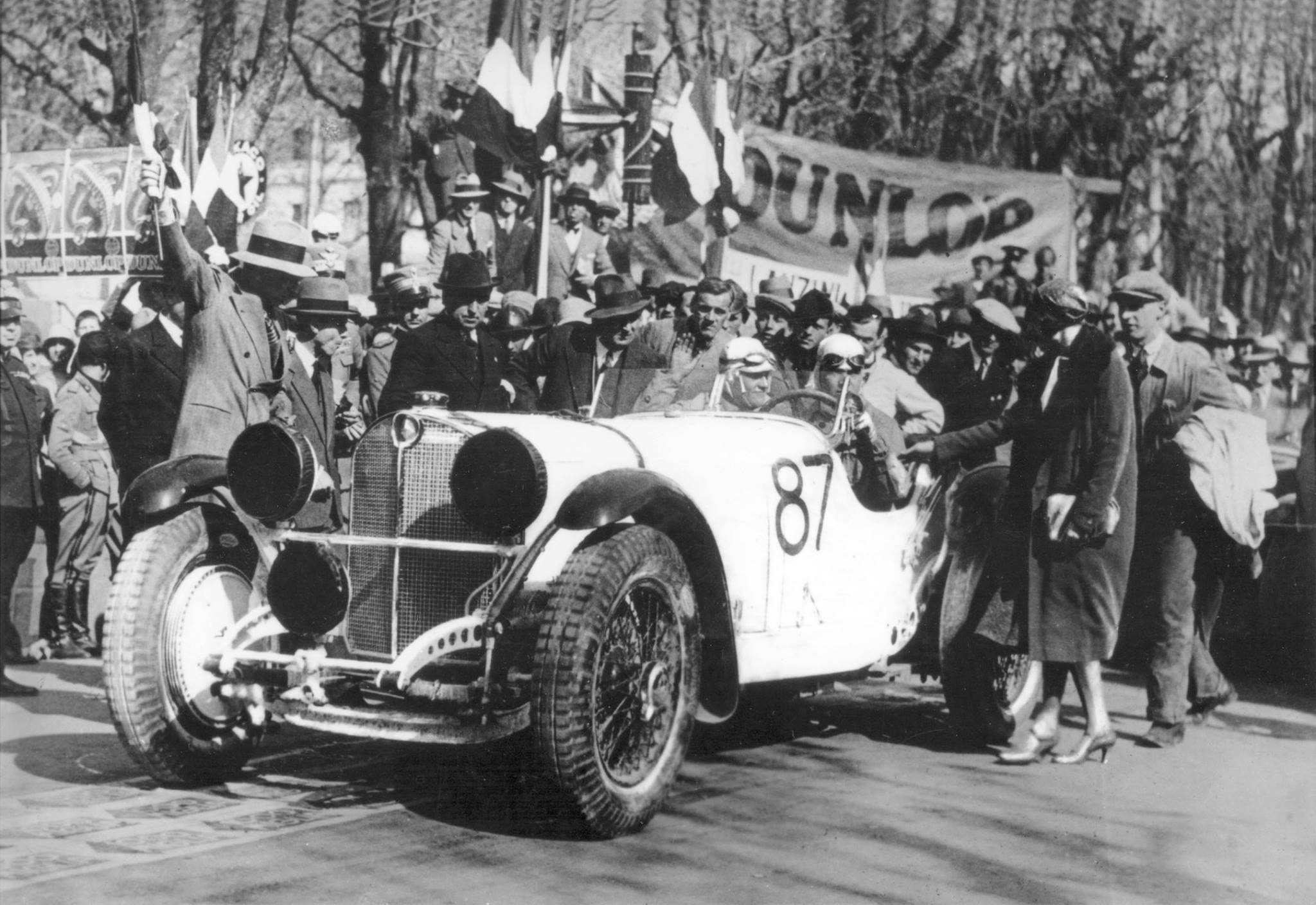
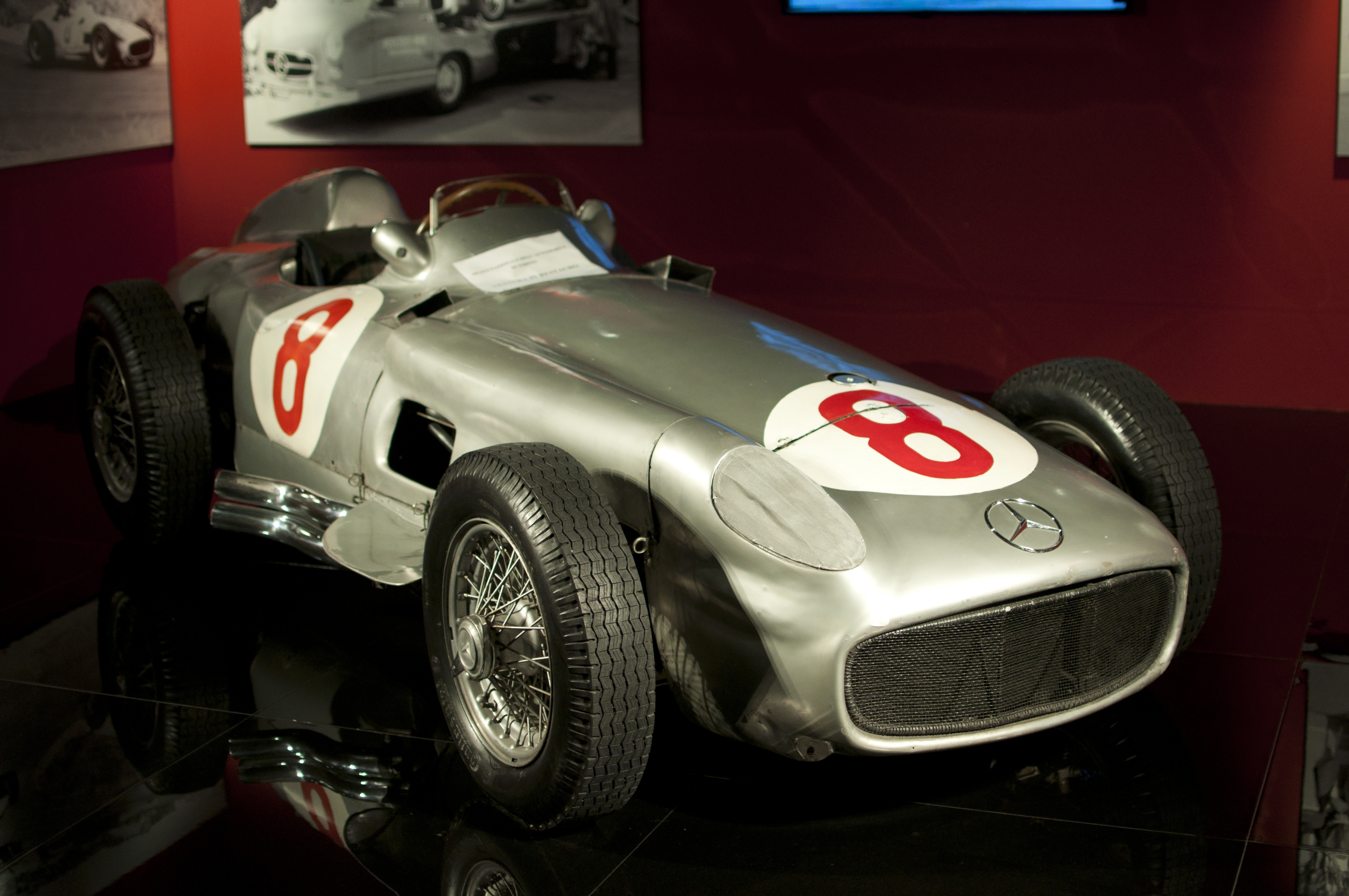
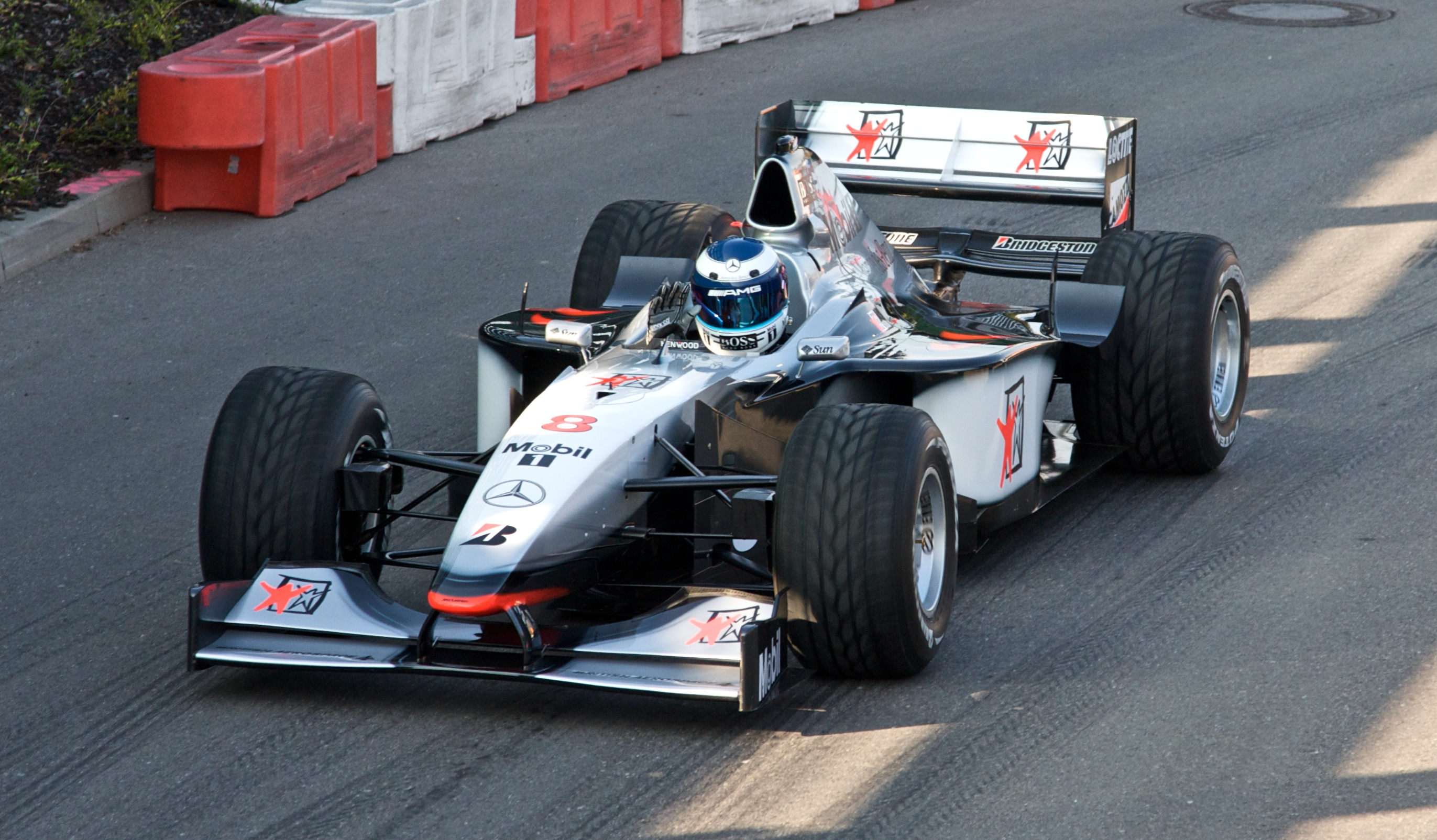
Mercedes-Benz racing cars from past to present
Clockwise from above: 1900 Daimler Phoenix and Benz Rennwagen, 1931 Mille Miglia winner, 2008 MP4-13, 1954 W196R

Throughout its long history that began in the 1880s, in separate companies that independently invented the modern automobile and merged only in 1926, Mercedes-Benz has been involved in a range of successful motorsport activities, including sportscar racing, touring car racing, Grand Prix racing, and rallying. It is currently active in GT racing, and Formula One.

Mercedes-Benz is also one of only three constructors (alongside McLaren and Ford) to complete the informal Triple Crown of Motorsport (wins at the Indianapolis 500, 24 Hours of Le Mans, and Monaco Grand Prix), a feat that Mercedes-Benz achieved as both a chassis manufacturer and an engine manufacturer by winning the 1952 24 Hours of Le Mans.

In addition, Mercedes and Benz swept the podium of the eponymous Grand Prix race, the French Grand Prix, already in 1908 and 1914, and also won semi-legendary discontinued road racing events like the Targa Florio (1922, 1924, 1955), Mille Miglia (1931, 1955), and Carrera Panamericana (1952).

== Early history ==
=== Benz ===
Karl Benz's company, Benz & Cie., in spring 1888 had granted the sole agency rights for Benz vehicles and engines in France to Émile Roger. Roger was not only a high-performing sales partner for Carl Benz, selling vehicles from Germany with great success; this step also marked the beginning of foreign sales for Benz. A single Benz competed in the world's first motor race, the 1894 Paris–Rouen, where it finished 14th in 10 hours 1 minute.

In the 1908 French Grand Prix, Benz scored second and third behind the winning Mercedes. In that era, based on its Grand Prix cars but with an engine intended for airships, Benz also built the "bird beaked" Blitzen Benz that set land speed records several times, reaching 228.1 km/h (141.7 mph) in 1911. That record gained that model the reputation of being faster than any other vehicle including trains or planes. They constructed many aerodynamically designed race cars.

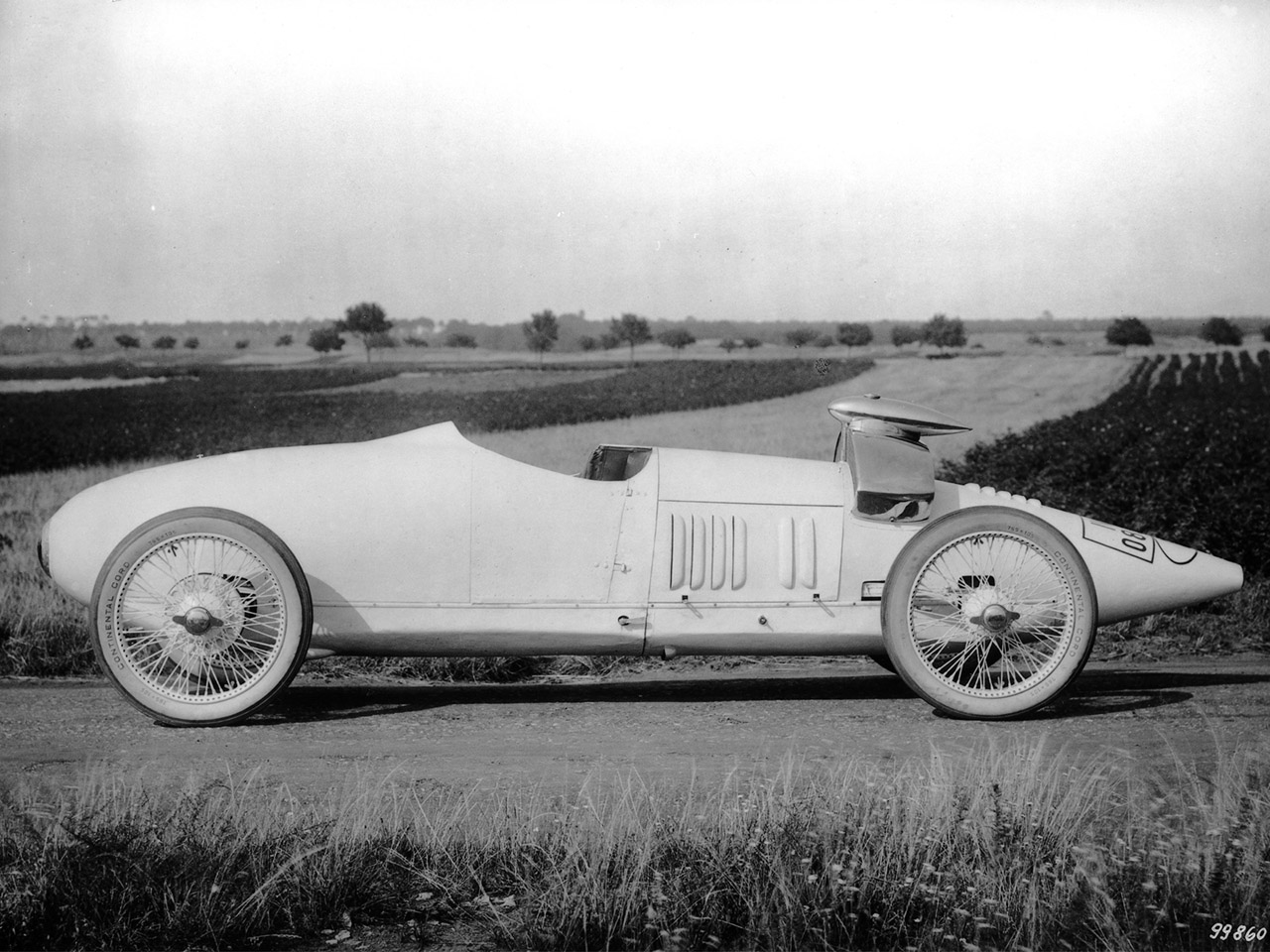
1923 Benz Tropfenwagen

After the Great War, in 1921, Benz licensed the design of the Rumpler Tropfenwagen, a teardrop shape car made in Berlin on a Rear mid-engine, rear-wheel-drive layout chassis. The lower and sportier Benz Tropfenwagen, the brainchild of Benz chief engineer Hans Nibel (1880–1934), was intended to increase public acceptance of mid engined cars. Despite Germany being in a crisis in the early 1920s, Benz got again involved in Grand Prix motor racing from 1923, introducing the mid engine layout to GP motorsport at the "European Grand Prix", the 1923 Italian Grand Prix at Monza.

Also built in part by Rumpler engineers, they used the virtually unchanged Rumpler chassis. They were fitted with a 1,991 cc (121.5 cu in) DOHC inline six producing 60 kW (80 hp) and demonstrated "impeccable roadholding" at 140 km/h (90 mph) and above. Despite a promising start, with a fourth and a fifth (and one retirement) in their debut, they did no better in three years of Grands Prix and hillclimbing, and the expected public acceptance did not materialize. Financial difficulties led to a merger with the nearby Daimler-Motoren-Gesellschaft in 1926.

=== Daimler/Mercedes ===
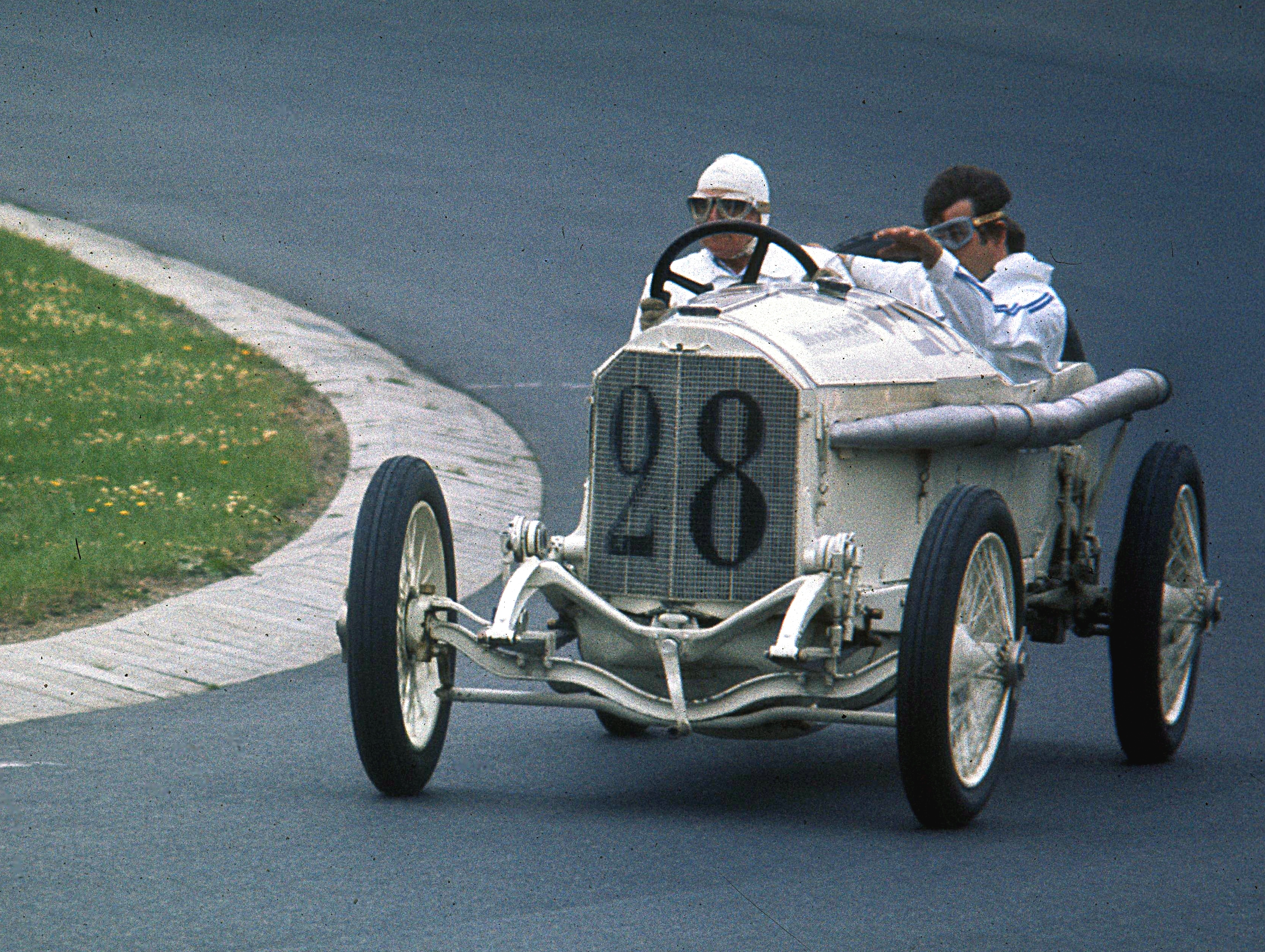
Daimler Mercedes 18/100 GP with 4.5 liter, the type that won the 1914 French GP, demonstrated in 1977

The Mercedes Simplex of 1902, built by DMG as the first purpose-built production race car—much lower than their usual designs—which were similar to horse carriages; that model dominated racing for years, and the Daimler company adopted the name for its products. In 1908, and again just before the beginning of the First World War, the DMG Mercedes 18/100 GP won the July 1914 French Grand Prix, finishing 1–2–3. The GP formula for that year restricted engine capacity to 4500cc and weight to 1100kg. In the US, Mercedes won the Elgin Trophy with driver Ralph DePalma in 1912 and 1914.

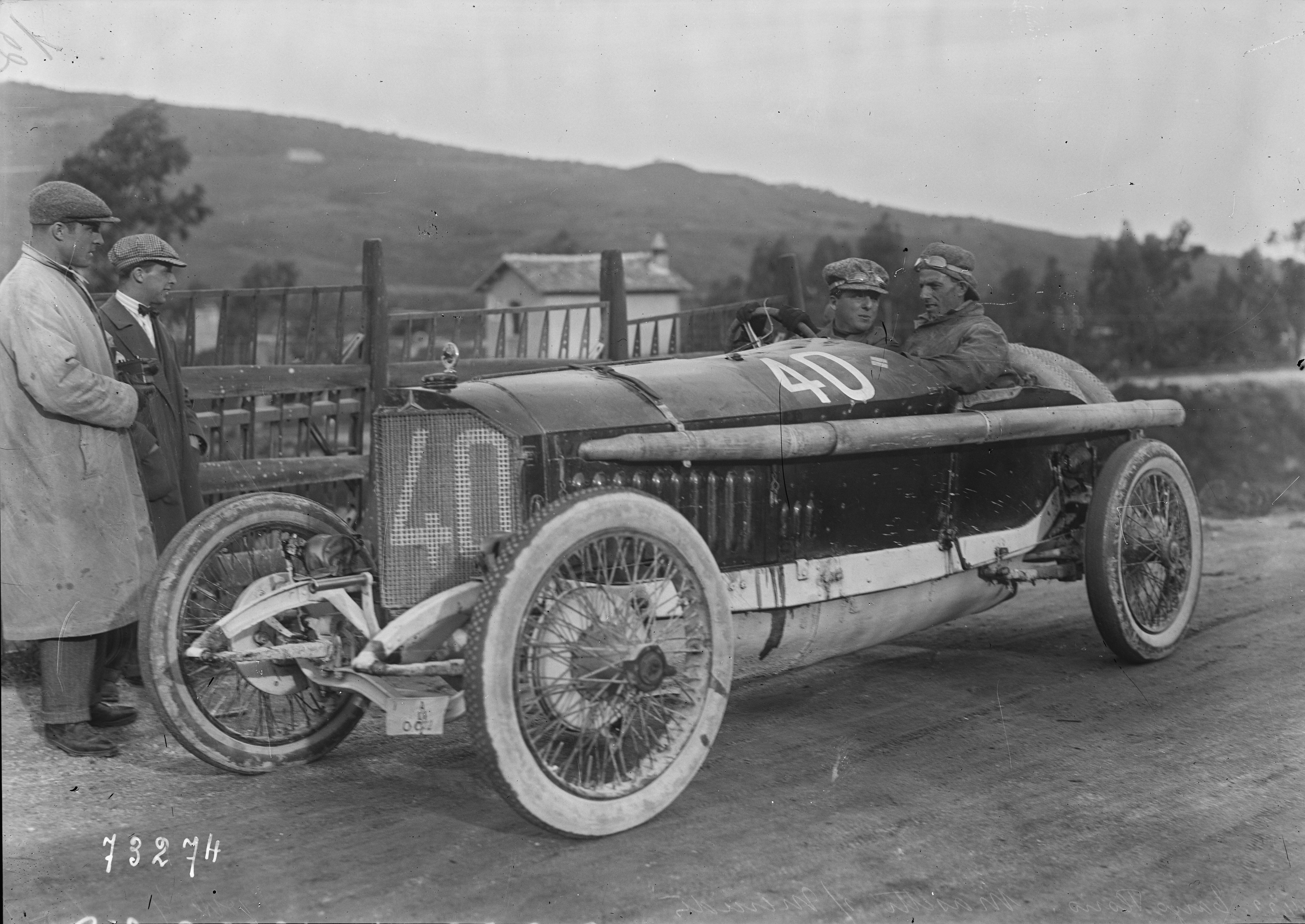
Giulio Masetti won the 1922 Targa Florio in a pre-war Mercedes GP 1914/4.5 painted red

After the war, Ferdinand Porsche, since 1906 at Austro-Daimler, was recruited by the Daimler-Motoren-Gesellschaft and became chief engineer in Stuttgart. Due to the financial crisis in Germany, talks with Benz were already under way. Anyway, Daimler made an effort to win at the Targa Florio, the road race in Sicily that was introduced in 1906, with several cars and engine configurations. Porsche upgraded existing pre-war 1914 models and built newer ones, also with supercharger and smaller 2 liter engines for current GP rules. Instead of the usual white for German race cars, they were painted red to blend in with the Italian entries, and Giulio Masetti won the event with a pre-war 4.5 liter GP car. Mercedes entered the 1923 Indianapolis 500 with three supercharged cars.

In 1924, Christian Werner added a second Targa win for Mercedes, this time in a smaller post-war GP 2 liter supercharged car again painted red to blend in with Italians cars. The inaugural 1926 German Grand Prix at AVUS in Berlin was won by Rudolf Caracciola as "privateer" with a modified version of the Mercedes GP car as Daimler was already busy with merging with Benz.

=== Mercedes-Benz ===
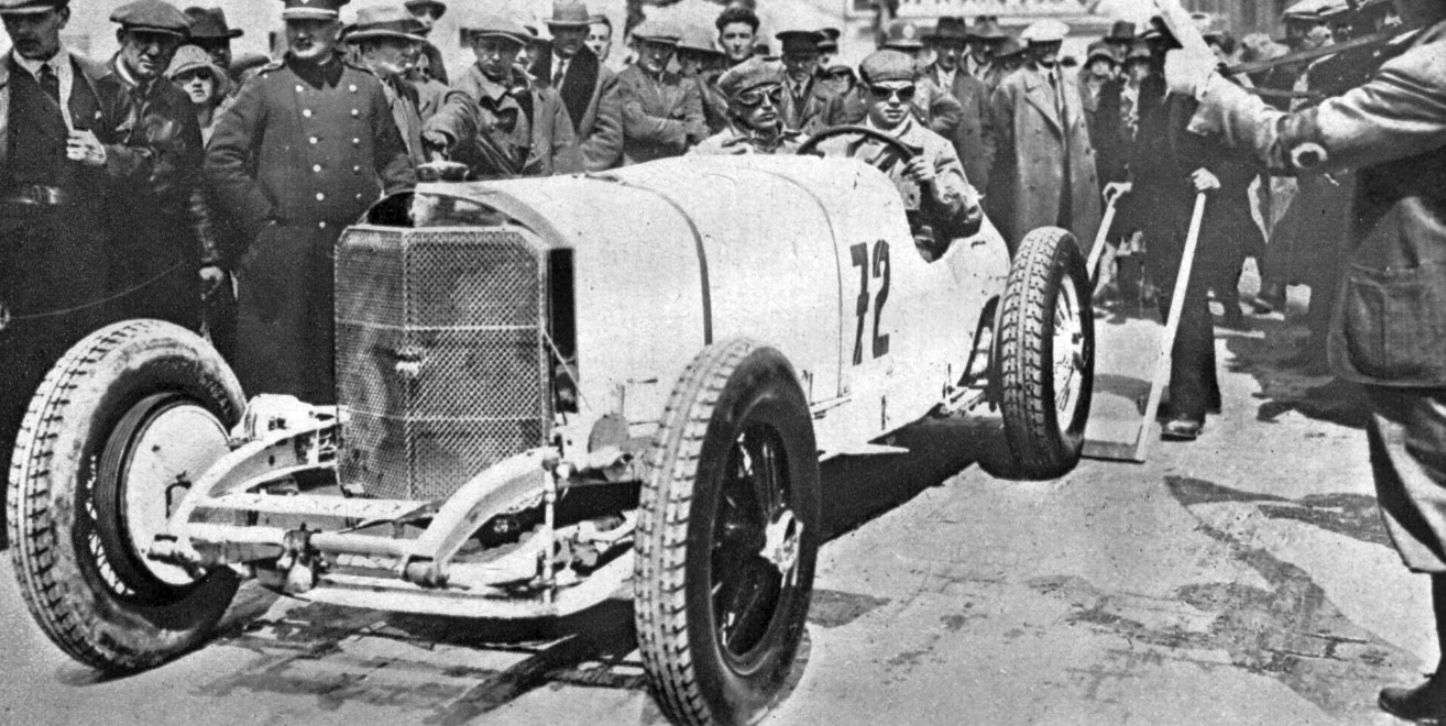
Rudolf Caracciola in his white elephant Mercedes-Benz SSK, 1929 Zbraslav-Jíloviště hillclimb

As Mercedes-Benz, production was split among the facilities of both companies, while the unified company factory discontinued GP racing efforts until the 1930s. Ferdinand Porsche continued as chief engineer, but Hans Nibel took over in 1929 (he died in 1934). Designs were numbered in a new scheme. The smallest project, W01, was never built, thus the entry level Mercedes-Benz W02 2 liter became known as 200. At the other end of the model range, the supercharged Mercedes-Benz W06 sportstourer became known as Mercedes-Benz S-Series, with S for Sport, later versions Super Sport, and Super Sport Kurz (Mercedes-Benz SSK). These Porsche designs with big 7 liter engines, supercharged up to 300 hp, were raced by customers as two-seat sportscars well into the 1930s, especially by Rudolf Caracciola who won the 1931 Mille Miglia, the 1931 German Grand Prix and was fast at 1931 Le Mans and even at the 1929 Monaco Grand Prix where much smaller current Grand Prix cars succeeded.

== Grand Prix motor racing ==
An AIACR European Championship for drivers was introduced in the 1931 Grand Prix season, and also run in the 1932 Grand Prix season, based on three major Grands Prix, the Italian Grand Prix, the French Grand Prix, and either the Belgian Grand Prix (1931) or German Grand Prix (1932). Races were run to existing Formula Libre regulations, with a minimum car weight of 900 kg. Winning cars were Bugatti Type 51, still a two-seater, and the Alfa Romeo P3, or Tipo B of the Alfa Romeo 8C models, considered to be the world's first genuine single-seater Grand Prix racing car. Some drivers entered the Mercedes-Benz SSK without success, but when Rudolf Caracciola drove an Alfa in 1932, he won two third places and the 1932 German Grand Prix.

The scoring system rewarded participation and reliability over wins in single events. Ferdinando Minoia became 1931 champion basically by just entering and finishing all three races, which nobody else did, and covering a total distance of 3935 km, much more than anyone else. The 1932 championship of Tazio Nuvolari was well deserved also in terms of speed, as he won two GPs and finished as a close second in the third.

The AIACR paused its European Championship in 1933 and 1934, with new rules for GP cars introduced for 1934.

=== The Silver Arrows (1934–1939) ===
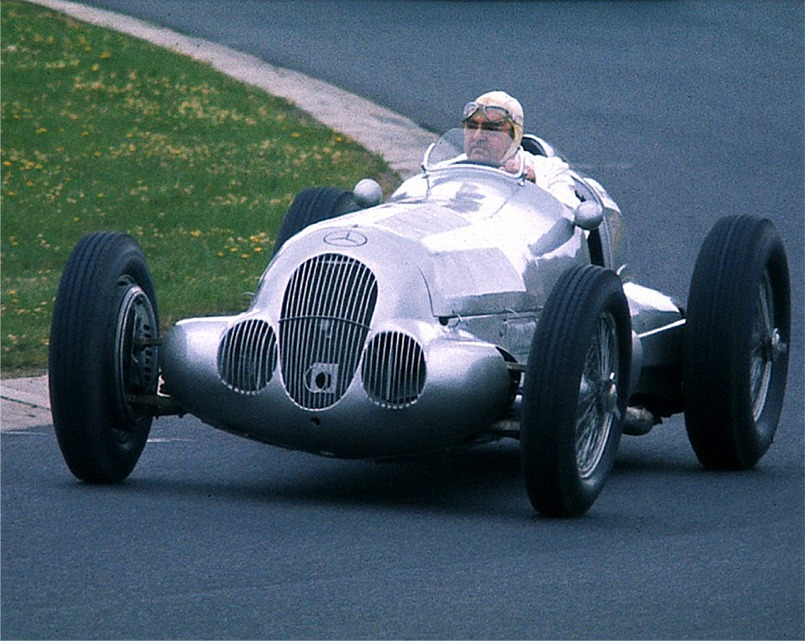
Hermann Lang at the wheel of a 1937 Mercedes-Benz W125

The traditional international auto racing color for German-entered cars is white, but the Mercedes that won the Targa Florio in the 1920s were painted red, and some stream-lined constructions like the SSKL of Manfred von Brauchitsch for the Avusrennen in 1932 were made from unpainted sheet metal and called Silver Arrow by the press.

When new Grand Prix motor racing rules were discussed and then announced for the 1934 Grand Prix season, with dry weight without wheels being limited to a maximum of 750kg and no restrictions on engine size, Daimler-Benz decided to (re-)enter Grand Prix racing with a multi-year multi-car multi-race factory effort despite the ongoing Great Depression in Germany and elsewhere. This was aided since 1933 by subsidies from the new German government, which were also granted to the racing effort of Auto Union racing cars. These were based on Porsche's rear P-wagen proposal, similar to the Tropfenwagen.

Both companies in 1934 introduced GP cars with around 300 hp from about 3 liter capacity, the same power as the big SSK sportstourer, from half the engine size, and with half the overall weight, and only a single seat. Both the Mercedes-Benz W25 and the Auto Union A appeared in silver, and soon were called Silver Arrows. They only won a couple of races in 1934, but adding about 1 litre of engine size and 100 hp per year, mostly dominated from the 1935 Grand Prix season to the 1937 Grand Prix season, when the Mercedes-Benz W125 had over 600hp, and the V16 Auto Union C nearly as much. Rudolf Caracciola became European champion in 1935, 1937 and 1938, and Bernd Rosemeyer in 1936 for Auto Union. 1939 season and championship was not officially concluded.

For the 1938 Grand Prix season, engine size was limited to 3 liter, and more weight was required, but new V12-powered models Mercedes-Benz W154 and Auto Union D continued with same or better pace, also in 1939.

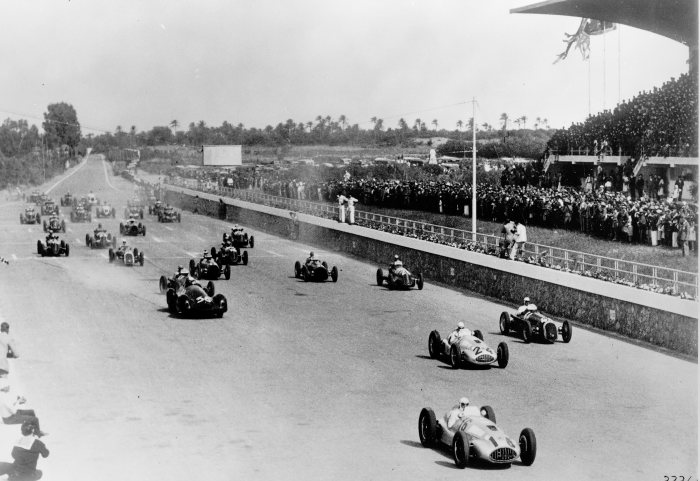
Two Mercedes-Benz W165 leading at the start of the 1939 Tripoli GP for Voiturette (F2) cars

The Italian, French, British manufacturers focussed on the smaller Voiturette class that limited engine size to 1.5 liter when supercharged. The Tripoli Grand Prix in Italian North Africa in 1939 was run to the Voiturette rules, seemingly in an attempt to exclude the perennial German winners, but also a forecast of future GP rules. Mercedes thus decided to invest in a new design. In only eight months, the tiny Mercedes-Benz W165 was built, and won the 1939 Tripoli Grand Prix. In fact, the Voiturette rules in 1946 became Formula One, in effect until 1951.

As record versions, the unrestricted older cars set speed records up to 435 km/h (270 mph). The Mercedes-Benz team was guided by the great Rennleiter (racing team manager) Alfred Neubauer (1891–1980) until racing ceased at the start of WWII.

== Formula One ==
After the war, the remaining Mercedes-Benz W165 could have been entered in Grand Prix races, as the Voiturette rule set had been promoted to top class GP rules, called Formula One since 1946. Only two W165 had been built, they were with Caracciola in Switzerland, and one was taken to the US to race in the 1947 Indianapolis 500.

By 1950, Mercedes decided to return to racing, in sportscars with the Mercedes-Benz W194 "300 SL" that appeared in 1952. An update to the W165 was a project called Mercedes-Benz W195.

In early 1951, Mercedes took three pre-war W154s to Argentina to take part in two Formula Libre races of the Buenos Aires Grand Prix. Drivers were pre-war veteran Hermann Lang, Karl Kling, and local hero Juan Manuel Fangio who would win his first World Championship in 1951 and rejoin Mercedes in 1954. The old Mercedes did well, finishing second and third in each heat, but were beaten by a modern Ferrari 166 FL. Daimler decided that there was no point in competing with the old cars. Instead, they would run the new 300 SL in sportscars races in 1952, and then develop a Formula One car for the 2500cc new rules that would come into effect in 1954, with a car called Mercedes-Benz W196.

=== Original factory team (1954–1955) ===
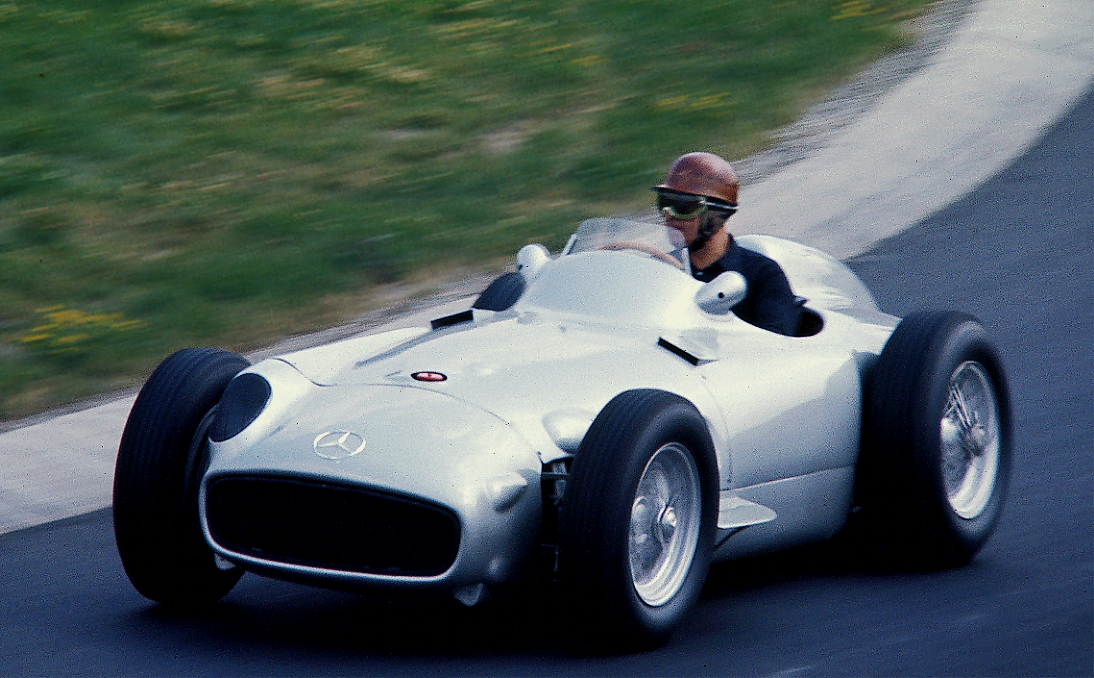
Karl Kling at the wheel of the W196 at Nürburgring

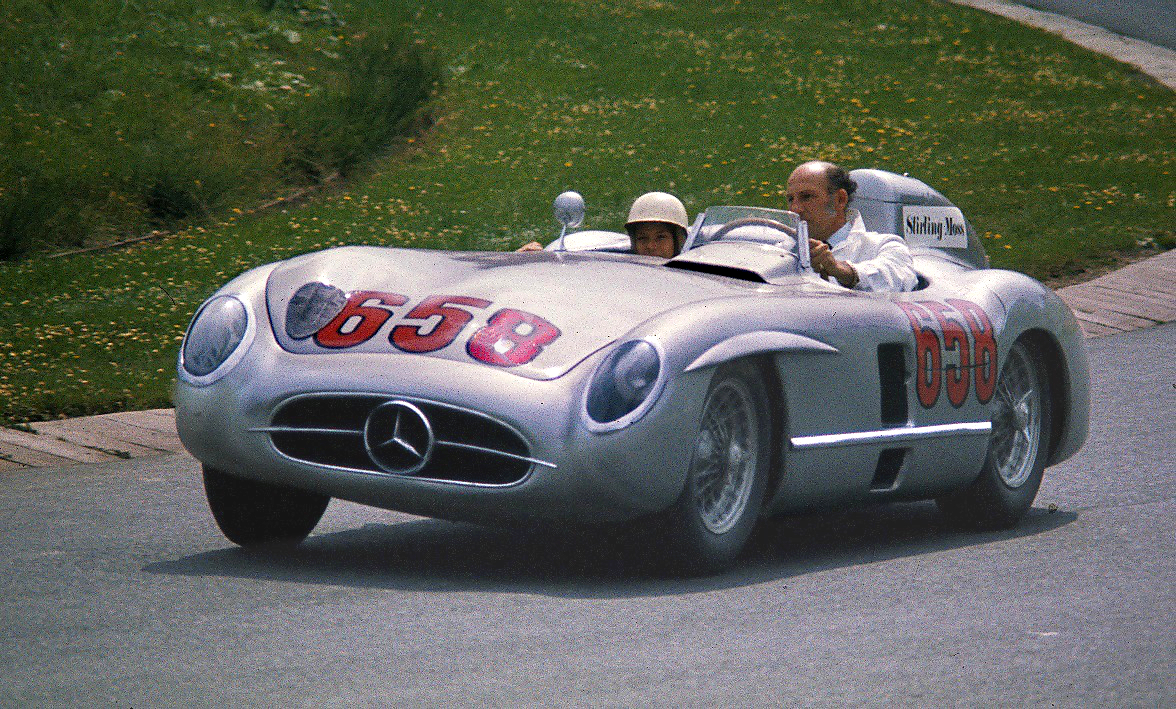
Stirling Moss drives the Mercedes-Benz 300 SLR of teammate Juan Manuel Fangio at the Nürburgring in 1977

In 1954 Mercedes-Benz returned to what was now known as Formula One racing (a World driver championship having been established in 1950), using the technologically advanced Mercedes-Benz W196 which was run in both open-wheeled and streamlined forms. Juan Manuel Fangio, a previous champion (1951), transferred mid-season from Maserati to Mercedes-Benz for their debut at the 4 July 1954 French Grand Prix. The team had immediate success and recorded a 1–2 victory with Fangio and Karl Kling, as well as the fastest lap for third driver Hans Herrmann. Fangio went on to win three more races in 1954, and the Championship.

The success continued into the 1955 season, where the same car was used again. The team's main drivers, Fangio and the young Stirling Moss, won 6 of the 9 rounds between them, and finished first and second in that year's championship.

In addition, Mercedes entered and won the 1955 World Sportscar Championship with the Sportscar version of the F1 car, the Mercedes-Benz 300 SLR.

Having proven that they could win both in F1 and sportscars, the company decided to discontinue racing at the end of the 1955 championships seasons to focus on road car development. The withdrawal is commonly attributed to the 1955 Le Mans disaster.

=== Engine supplier ===
Mercedes made its return to Formula One in 1994 as an engine supplier to Sauber, with whom they had already enjoyed success in sportscar racing, after 1993 funding their engine partner Ilmor, Mercedes and Sauber announced that the teams' engines will be rebadged "Mercedes-Benz" for the 1994 season thus signaling Mercedes partial return to factory-sponsored motorsport the first time since 1955. In the one year that Sauber ran Mercedes badged engines they only managed to score twelve points.

==== McLaren (1995–2014, 2021–) ====
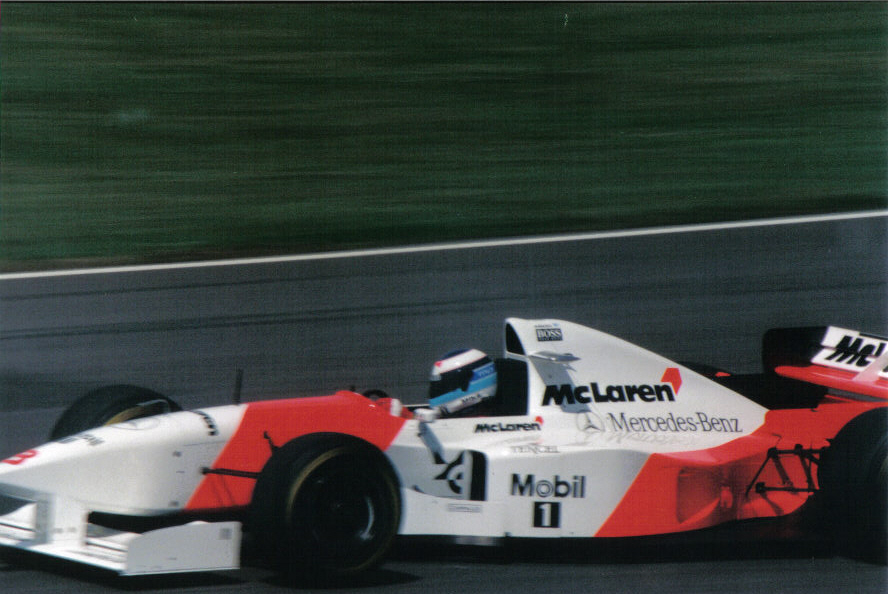
The 1995 McLaren-Mercedes MP4-10 Formula One car being driven by Mika Häkkinen.

1995 saw the normally aspirated Mercedes-Benz-Ilmor F1-V10 move to the Woking based McLaren team, replacing Peugeot who moved to supplying their engines to the Jordan team. In a season dominated by the Renault powered Benetton B195s and Williams FW17s, the McLaren-Mercedes partnership produced thirty points with 2 podium finishes from Mika Häkkinen. 1996 produced similar results to '95 with the team finishing behind the trio of Williams, Benetton and Ferrari, but the team still scored three times as many podium positions in comparison to the previous year. Outside Formula One, Mercedes-Benz had increased its shareholding in the Ilmor company in 1996 and took full control nine years later. They have continued to design and build engines for McLaren.

In the opening race of the 1997 Formula One season, David Coulthard produced victory for McLaren and ushered in a new era of success for the British based squad. Coincidentally this was the first race in which McLaren had competed with a silver livery due to West replacing Marlboro, who moved to Ferrari, as title sponsor. The colour drew inevitable comparisons to the Silver Arrows of a previous era, and the nickname was applied to the McLarens. This was a significant result in F1 racing, McLaren's first victory for three seasons and the first win for Mercedes-Benz since Juan Manuel Fangio's success at the 1955 Italian Grand Prix. McLaren and Mercedes-Benz still, however, finished fourth in the Constructors' Championship behind the same three teams as the previous two seasons, but they had collected more than twice as many points in '97 as they had in '95.

With an Adrian Newey designed MP4/13 for 1998, McLaren went on to win both the Drivers' Championship with Häkkinen and the Constructors' title, their first in seven years, by twenty-three points to their nearest rivals Ferrari. Häkkinen went on to win the title for the second time in succession the following season, however, the team failed to retain their Constructors' title, losing it to Ferrari by four points.

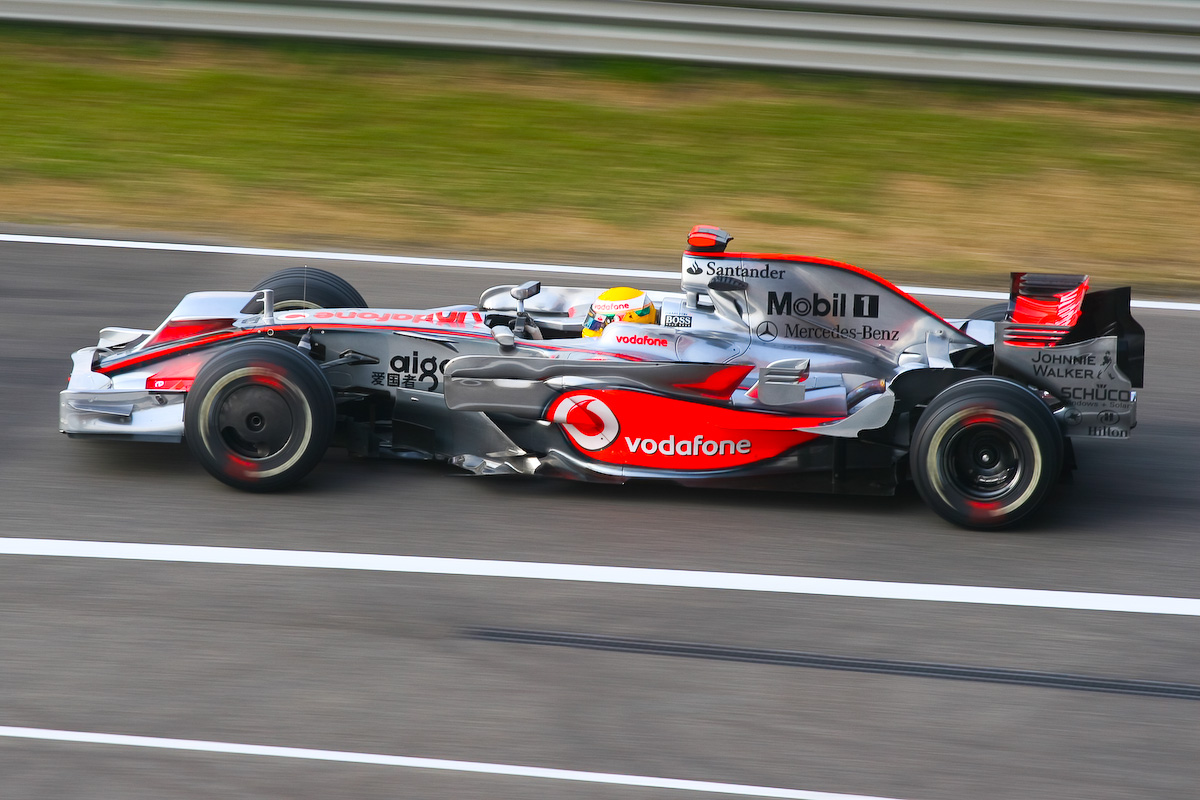
The 2008 McLaren-Mercedes MP4-23 helped Lewis Hamilton win the 2008 Formula One Championship.

2000 and 2001 saw McLaren and their drivers play second fiddle to the dominant partnership of Michael Schumacher and Ferrari, as the Italian-German partnership won nineteen of a possible thirty-four races. Häkkinen retired from Formula One before the 2002 season, although he would later represent Mercedes in the Deutsche Tourenwagen Masters series. Fellow Finn Kimi Räikkönen replaced him. McLaren dropped down the order in terms of Constructors' Championship position, losing its second-place position to the BMW-Williams team, with the season still being dominated overall by Schumacher and Ferrari. For the following four years McLaren proved to be one of the fastest cars in the field but lacked in reliability, most notably in 2005 and 2006; the 2006 season marked the first since 1996 in which McLaren had failed to win a race. In 2007 McLaren's drivers finished second and third in the Drivers' Championship, only 1 point behind Champion Kimi Räikkönen. The team was also disqualified from the championship. In 2008 Lewis Hamilton won the Drivers' Championship by 1 point from Ferrari's Felipe Massa. Jenson Button won McLaren-Mercedes' last race in the V8 era at the 2012 Brazilian Grand Prix.

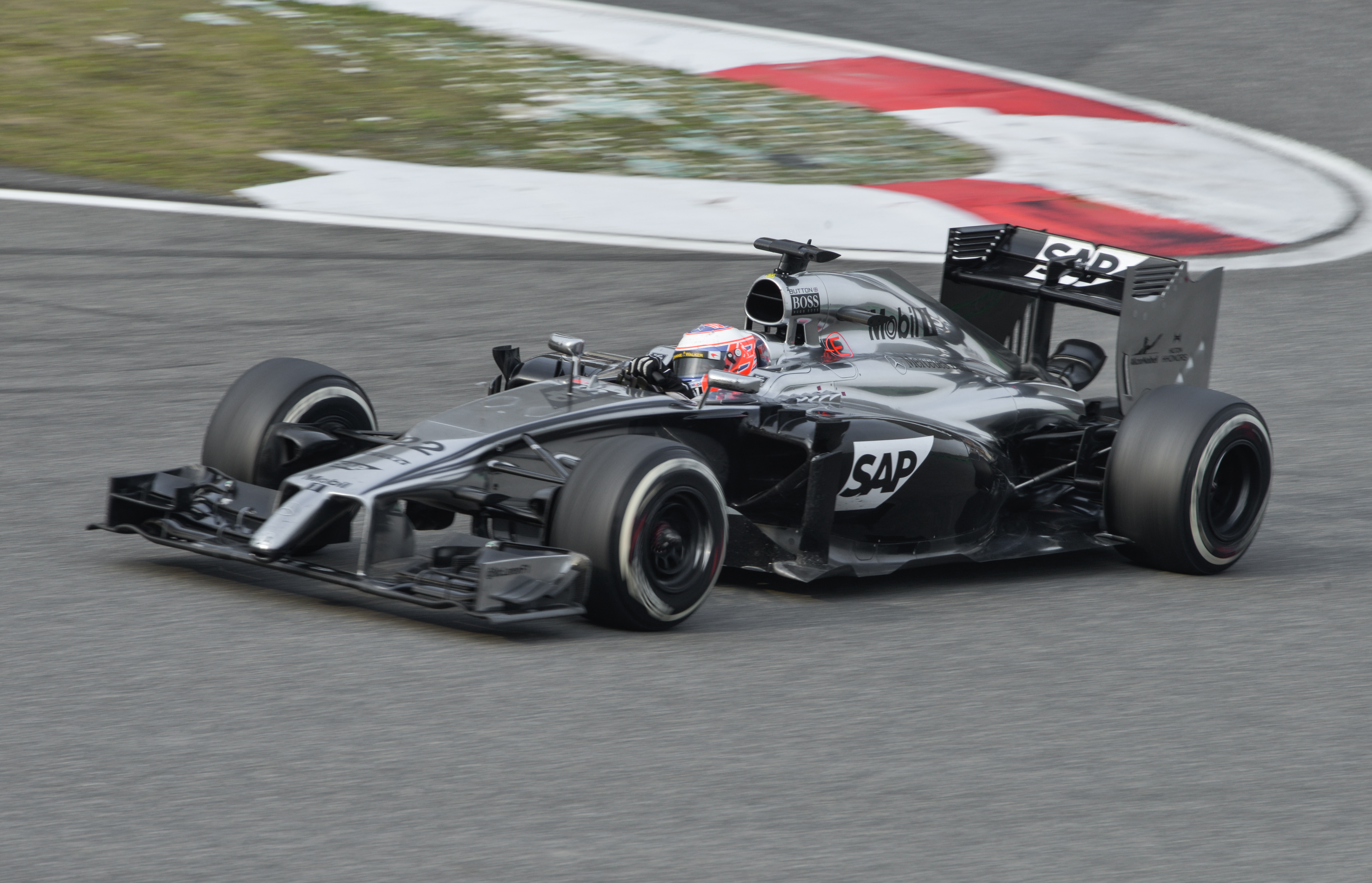
Jenson Button driving the McLaren-Mercedes MP4-29, the last McLaren-Mercedes powered car before the new partnership starting in 2021.

For the 2014 Season, McLaren-Mercedes used the Mercedes PU106A Hybrid, a 1.6-litre V6 turbocharged engine. In their final season as McLaren-Mercedes the team finished fifth in the World Constructors' Championship standings with 181 points. At the end of the season, Mercedes-Benz officially ended its 20-year partnership with McLaren.

On September 28, 2019, Mercedes-Benz and McLaren agreed to a four-year deal for Mercedes-Benz to be an engine supplier for McLaren in the beginning of the year 2021. McLaren's first season back with Mercedes power saw them achieve a 1-2 result at the 2021 Italian Grand Prix with Daniel Ricciardo and Lando Norris finishing first and second, respectively, and three further podiums (all from Norris) to finish fourth in the Constructors' Championship, by losing third place to Ferrari. In 2023, the existing partnership between McLaren and Mercedes was extended to 2030. McLaren went on to win Constructors' championships in 2024 and 2025. Lando Norris clinched the drivers' title in 2025 by 2 points from Red Bull's Max Verstappen.

==== Williams (2014–present) ====
In early 2013, it was announced that Mercedes-Benz would be the engine supplier to Williams for the 2014 season. The team finished the 2015 season placing third in the World Constructors' Championship standings with 257 points, with both Felipe Massa and Valtteri Bottas scoring 4 podiums during the season. For the next two seasons, the team finished fifth in 2016 and 2017. For the 2018 season, Williams-Mercedes faced a disappointing season only finishing tenth in the World Constructors' Championship standings. On 13 September 2019, Williams and Mercedes-Benz agreed to extend their partnership until 2025.

=== Safety cars ===
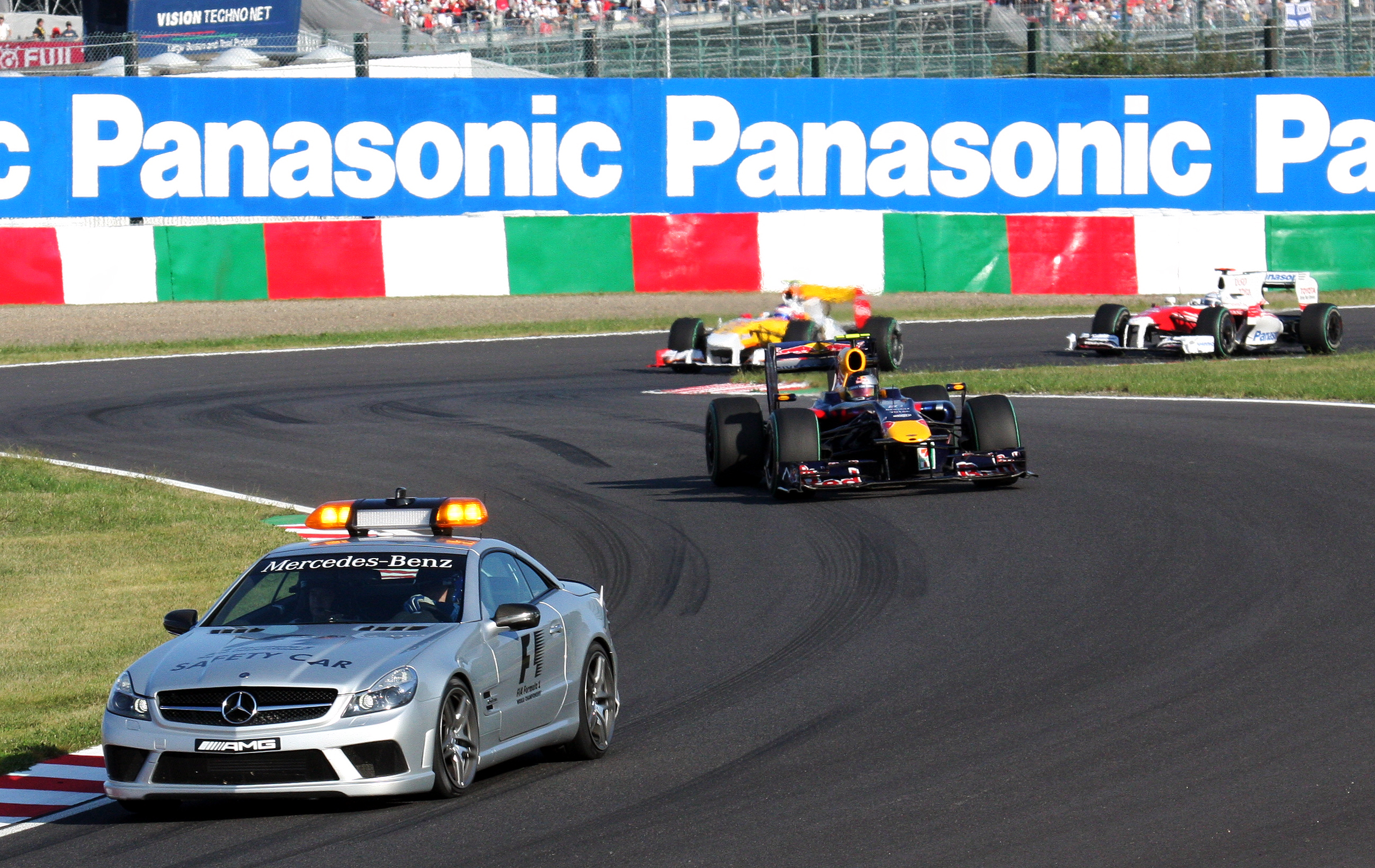
Since 1996, Mercedes-Benz have supplied their cars for use as safety cars in Formula One.

In 2003, the partnership between Mercedes and McLaren was extended into the production of a Mercedes-McLaren roadcar, the SLR. Mercedes also supplies the cars to the FIA for use as safety cars and other race official roles, such as the medical car, at Formula One races. Currently, in Formula One, Mercedes and Aston Martin both supply the Safety Car and alternate per race. At the moment the Mercedes safety car is a red design.

=== New factory team (2010–present) ===
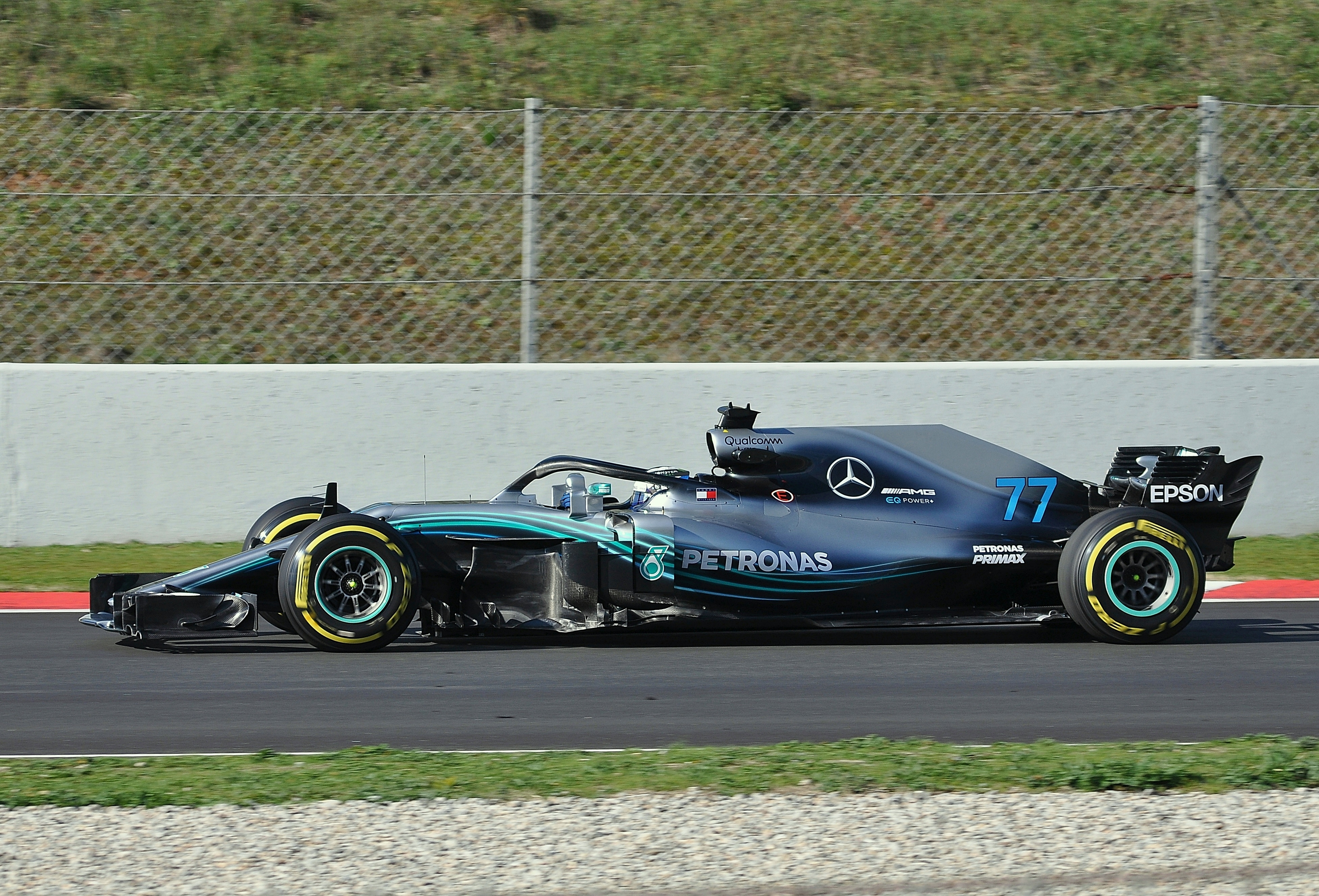
The Mercedes AMG F1 W09 EQ Power+, which won Mercedes' fifth consecutive Constructors' Championship

On November 16, 2009, it was announced that Mercedes would buy Brawn. They purchased 75% which gave them the controlling stake in the 2009 championship-winning team Brawn GP. The team, renamed and branded Mercedes GP, debuted at the 2010 Bahrain Grand Prix, with an all-German driver line-up of Nico Rosberg and Michael Schumacher and was their full return to factory sponsored motorsport in F1. Over the next few years, with Lewis Hamilton in the team, Mercedes would go on to win eight consecutive Formula One World Constructors' Championships from 2014 to 2021 the third highest total in Formula One history. Mercedes also won seven Drivers' Championships until Hamilton lost the title to Max Verstappen in 2021.

== Sportscar racing ==
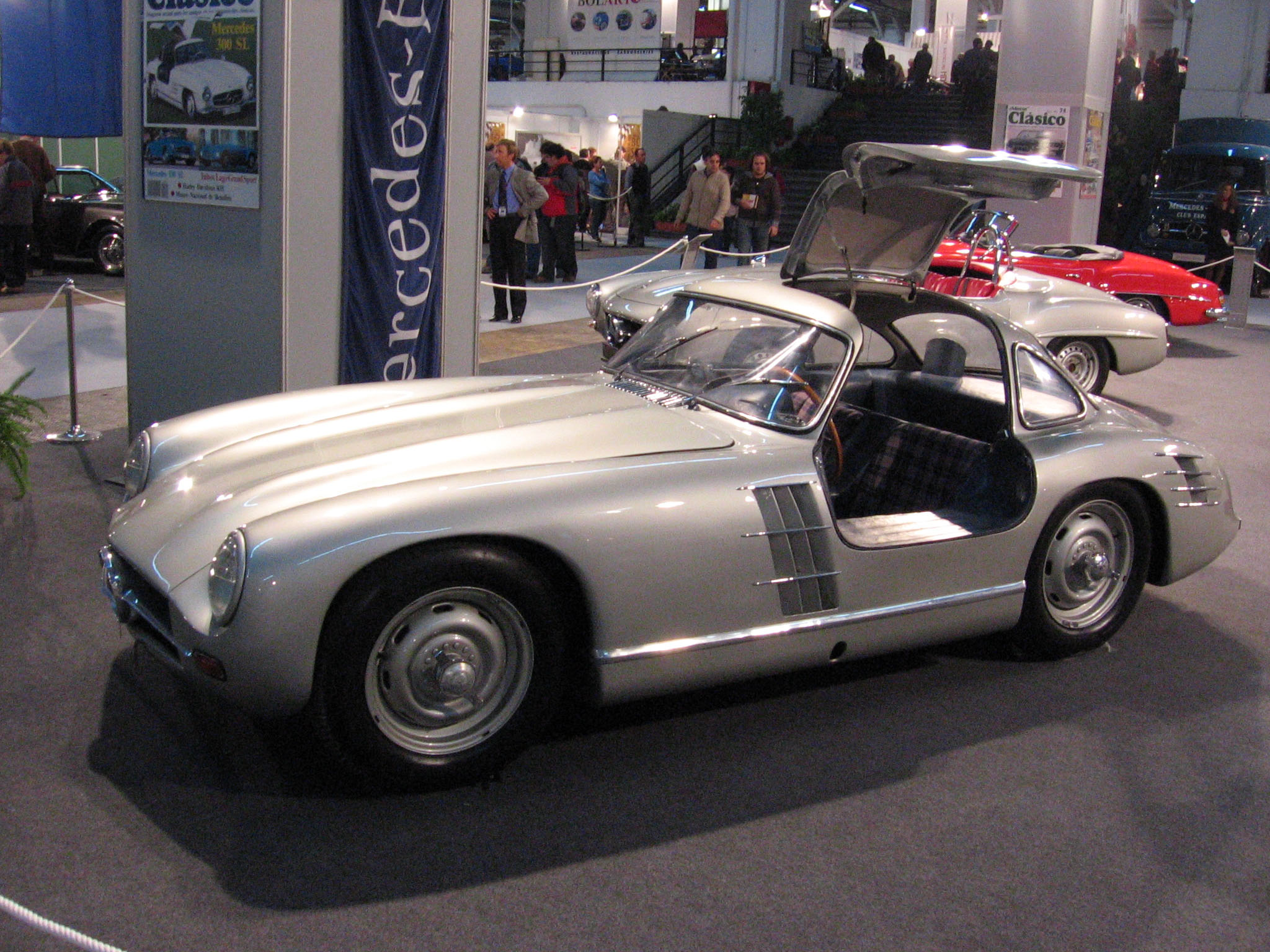
The Mercedes-Benz 300SL Transaxle, the 1953 prototype used in the return to motorsports

It was in 1952 that Mercedes-Benz returned to racing after the war, again with Alfred Neubauer as team manager. The gull-winged Mercedes-Benz W194, won several races in 1952 including the 24 Hours of Le Mans, the Carrera Panamericana, and did well in other important races such as the Mille Miglia.

Mercedes-Benz was also dominant in sports car racing during the 1950s. The Mercedes-Benz 300 SLR was derived from the W196 Formula One car for use in the 1955 World Sportscar Championship season. At Le Mans that year, a disaster occurred in which a Mercedes-Benz 300 SLR collided with another car, killing more than eighty spectators. The team went on to win the two remaining races of the season, and won the Manufacturer's championship, but it had already been planned at the beginning of that year that the company would retire its teams at the end of the 1955 season. In fact in the aftermath of the Le Mans disaster, it would be several decades until Mercedes-Benz returned to front line motorsport.

In the late 1960s and early 1970s, Mercedes returned to competition through the tuning company AMG (later to become a Mercedes-Benz subsidiary), which entered the big Mercedes-Benz 300SEL 6.3 V8 sedan in the Spa 24 Hours and the European Touring Car Championship.

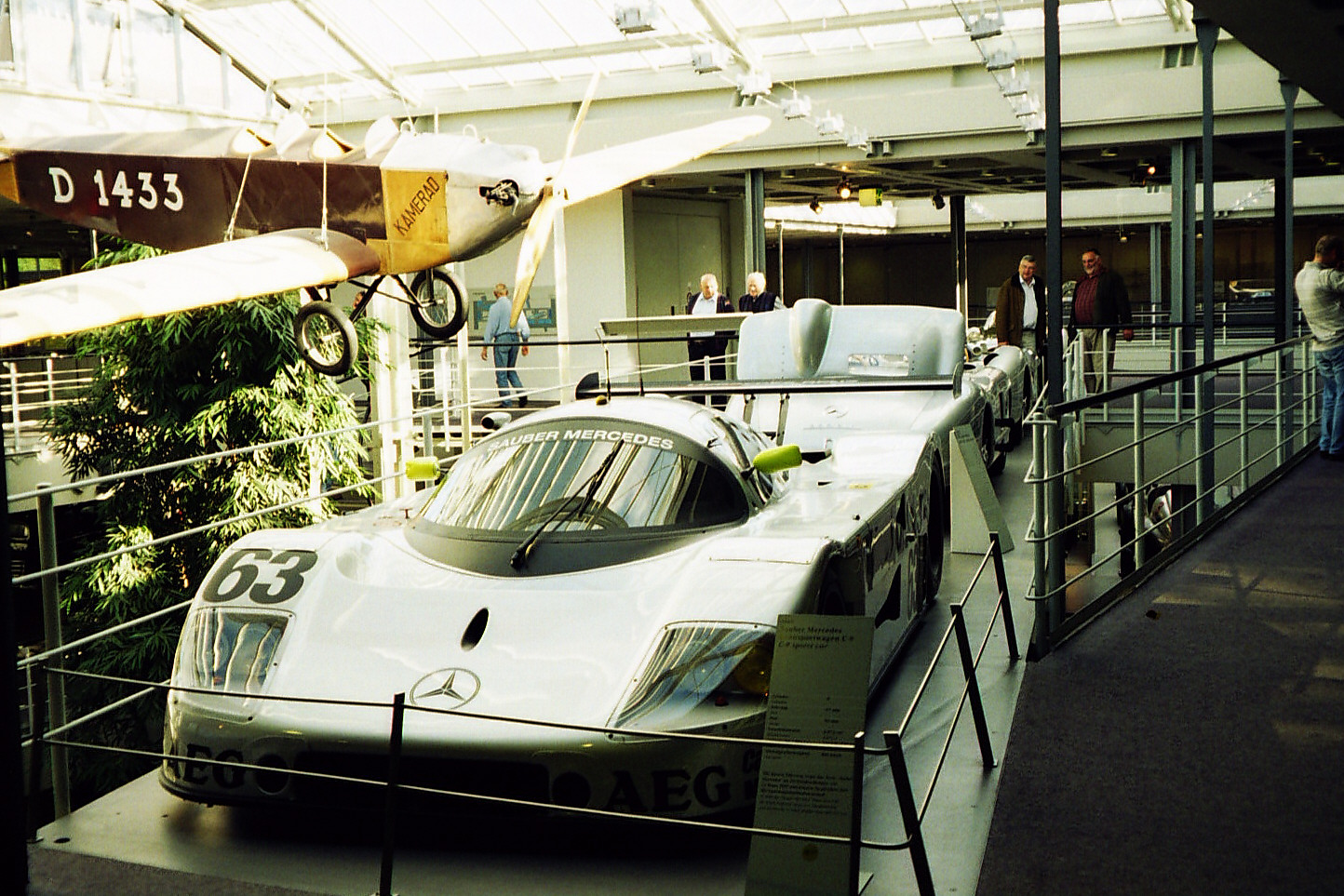
A Sauber/Mercedes C9 won at the 1989 24 Hours of Le Mans.

In 1985 Mercedes-Benz returned to the World Sportscar Championship as an engine supplier for the privateer Sauber team. The first car produced by this relationship, the Sauber C8 was not particularly successful. However the successor, the C9 won several races, including 24 Hours of Le Mans and World Sports Prototype Championship in 1989.

After the Sauber team parted company with their sponsor Kouros at the end of 1987, Mercedes-Benz increased their involvement with Sauber for the 1988 season to become a factory entrant under the Sauber-Mercedes name. Still using the C9 the team won 5 races but came second to the TWR Jaguar team in the championship. However, 1989 was to be a different story with Sauber-Mercedes winning all but one championship race to become world champions (including coming first and second at the 24 Hours of Le Mans - all achieved with the C9. For the 1990 World Sports Prototype Championship season the C9 was replaced by the all-new C11, while the team was renamed Mercedes-Benz (though the outfit was still run by Sauber). The team dominated the season, again winning all but one race to become world champions. Mercedes-Benz eventually withdrew from sportscar racing after a dismal 1991 season with the C291.

Mercedes-Benz returned to sportscar racing in 1997, with the CLK GTR which was entered in the new FIA GT Championship world championship series. In its first year, the CLK GTR, built by AMG, won the teams' and the drivers' championships. It would again dominate the FIA GT in 1998, and would go on to win its second championship in a row. The successor to this car, the CLR was a spectacular failure. It was entered in the 1999 Le Mans race only, but a series of accidents involving the car become airborne brought about the cancellation of the CLR project and Mercedes-Benz (as a factory team) has not participated in sports prototype racing since.

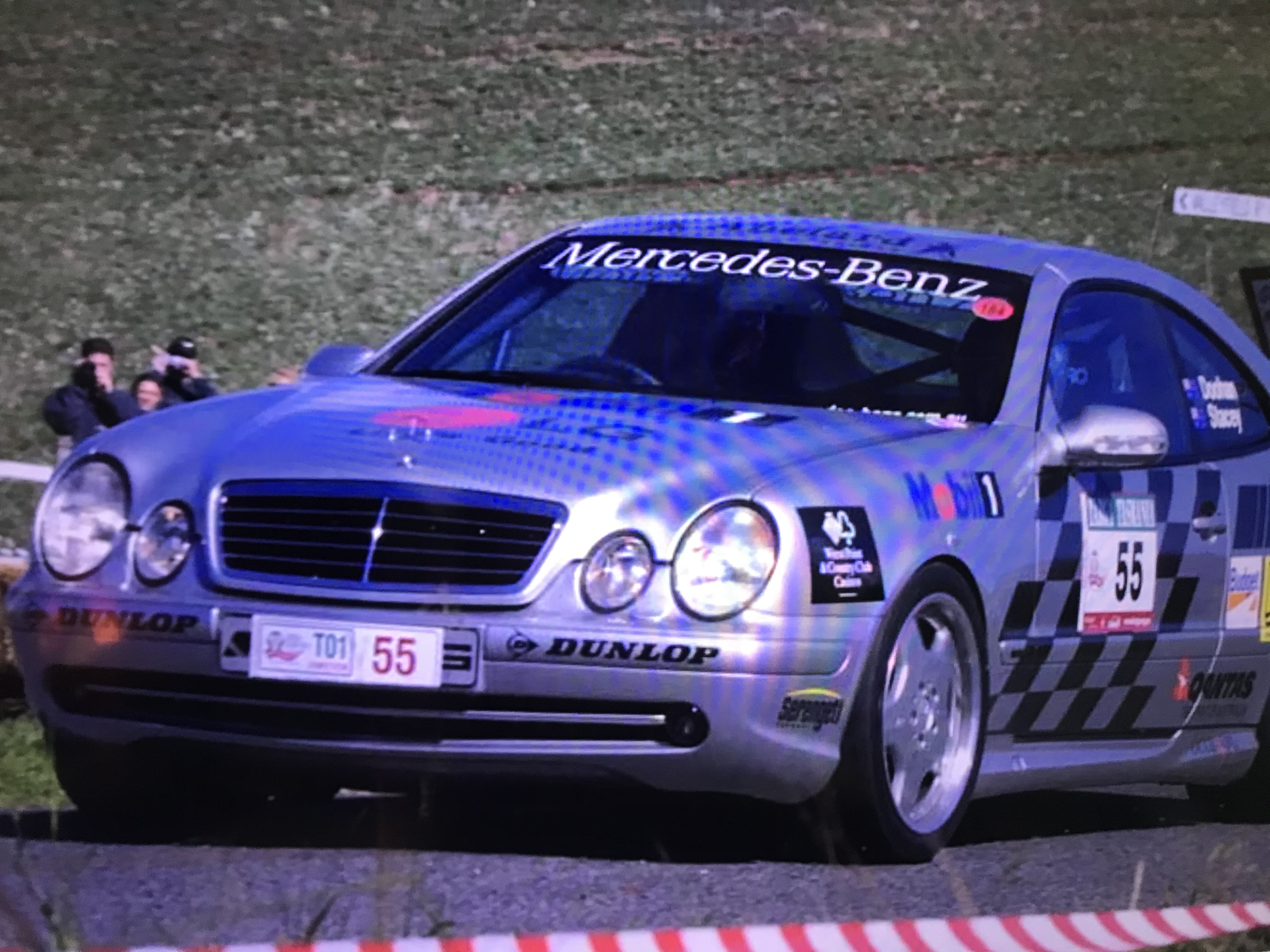
Mercedes-Benz CLK 55 AMG Works Tarmac Rally Car

In 2001, Mercedes-Benz and AMG returned to tarmac rallying, with a specially modified version of the W208 CLK55 AMG. Mercedes-Benz and AMG created a one off works Tarmac Rally Car to compete with full factory support in the 2001 Targa Tasmania tarmac rally in Australia. Mick Doohan, 5 time motorcycle world champion, was chosen as the works driver.

In 2011, Mercedes-Benz announced that a GT3 version of the Mercedes-Benz SLS AMG would be made available for private racing teams. Beginning that year, the SLS AMG GT3 has taken numerous endurance racing wins at the 24 Hours of Dubai, 24 Hours of Nürburgring and 24 Hours of Spa and has won many other races in national and global GT3 championships. In 2015, the new Mercedes-AMG GT3 was launched to replace the SLS AMG GT3. This was then followed up by an "Evo" version of the AMG GT3 in 2020, which has also seen tons of success. In late 2024, it was announced that Mercedes-AMG would return to Le Mans after 25 years as Iron Lynx is set to run two AMG GT3's in the 2025 FIA World Endurance Championship.

== Touring cars ==
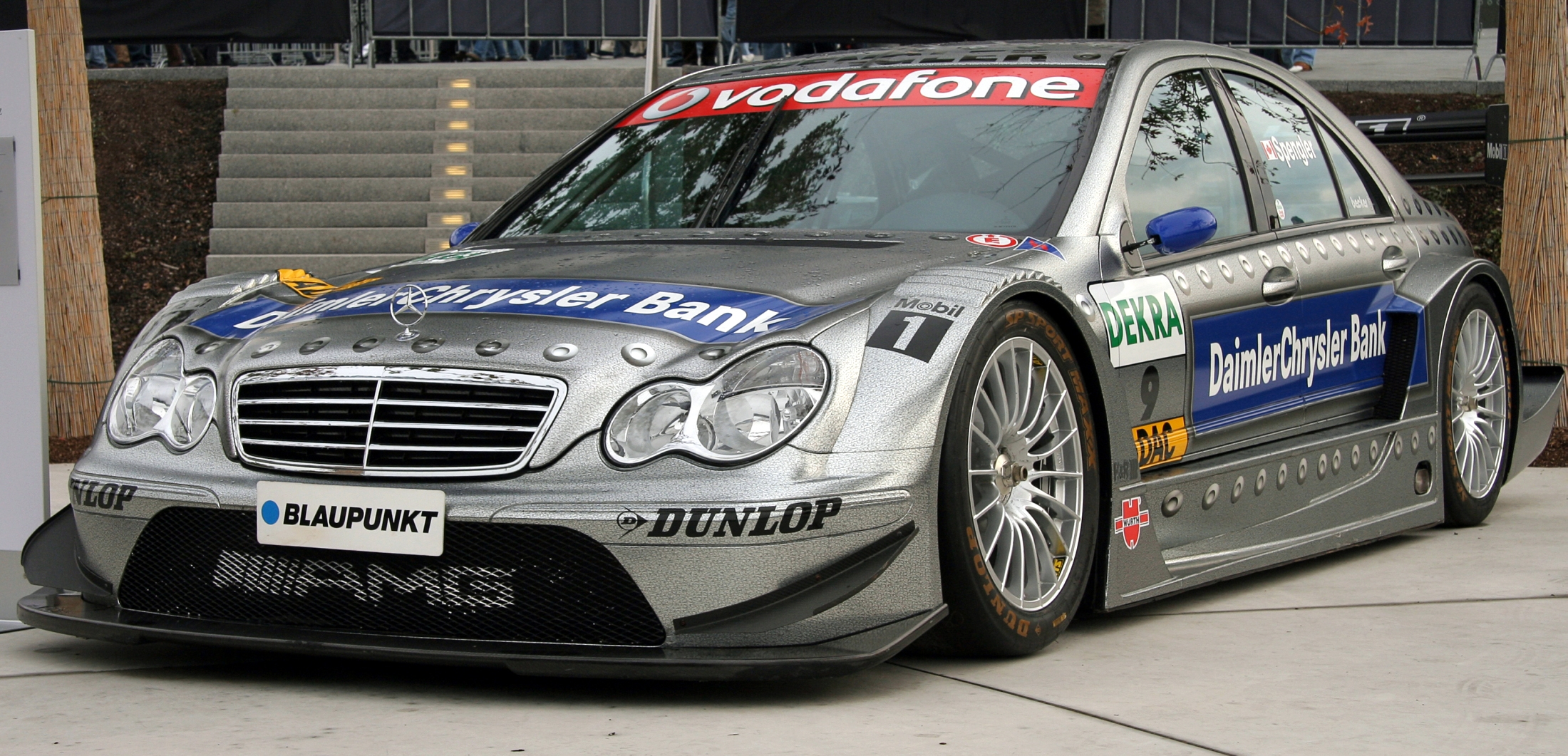
Mercedes-AMG C-Class DTM car (2006)

Mercedes-Benz had intended to enter rallying with the Mercedes-Benz W201 in the early 1980s. Yet, as all wheel drive and turbochargers were introduced by the competition (Audi Quattro) at that time, this was cancelled. Instead the W201 ended up being used in the DTM touring car series from 1988, with the car again being prepared by AMG, who became an official partner and continue to enter the new DTM. However, Mercedes-Benz ceased its factory involvement in DTM at the end of the 2018 season in order to join the Formula E series for Season 6 (2019–20).

In 2013, Mercedes-Benz entered the V8 Supercars Championship with the Erebus Motorsport team, fielding three Mercedes-Benz E63s V8s in 2013 and two in the 2014 and 2015 championships. For the 2016 season, Erebus ceased development of its E63 AMGs to instead field a pair of Holden VF Commodores, bringing an end to Mercedes-Benz' involvement in the Supercars Championship for the foreseeable future.

== Formula E ==
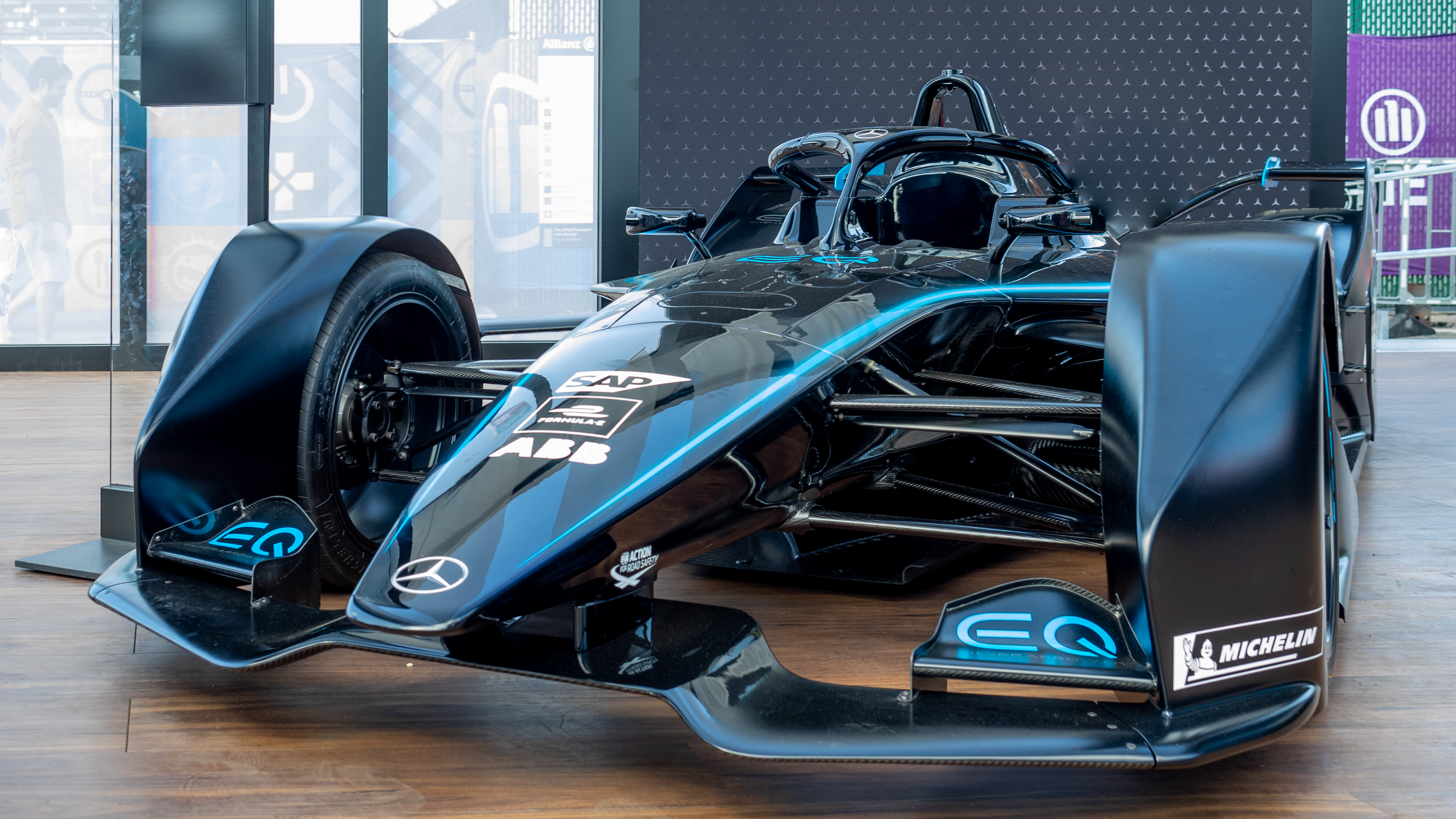
Mercedes-Benz EQ Silver Arrow 01

On July 24, 2017, Mercedes announced that they would enter the FIA Formula E Championship for the 2019–20 season with a works effort, leaving the DTM series in favour of the new venture. The team was known as the Mercedes EQ Formula E team and made use of the same powertrain development facility as the Formula One team, Mercedes AMG High Performance Powertrains in Brixworth, UK. One of the teams that ran Mercedes cars in the DTM entered the 2018–19 season as HWA Racelab, which became the full works team in 2019–20. They won both the 2020–21 and 2021–22 Formula E World Drivers' and Teams' Championships, with Stoffel Vandoorne and Nyck de Vries, before selling the team to McLaren.

== Other sports ==
=== Speed records ===
On August 13–21, 1983 at the Nardo High Speed Track in southern Italy, the new compact-size W201 190 class, sporting a 16-valve engine, built by Cosworth, broke three FIA world records after running almost non-stop (only a 20-sec pit stop every 2½ hours) in a total of 201 hours, 39 minutes, and 43 seconds—completing 50,000 kilometres (31,000 mi) at an average speed of 248 km/h (154 mph). It went on to become the 190E 2.3-16 touring model.

=== IndyCar ===
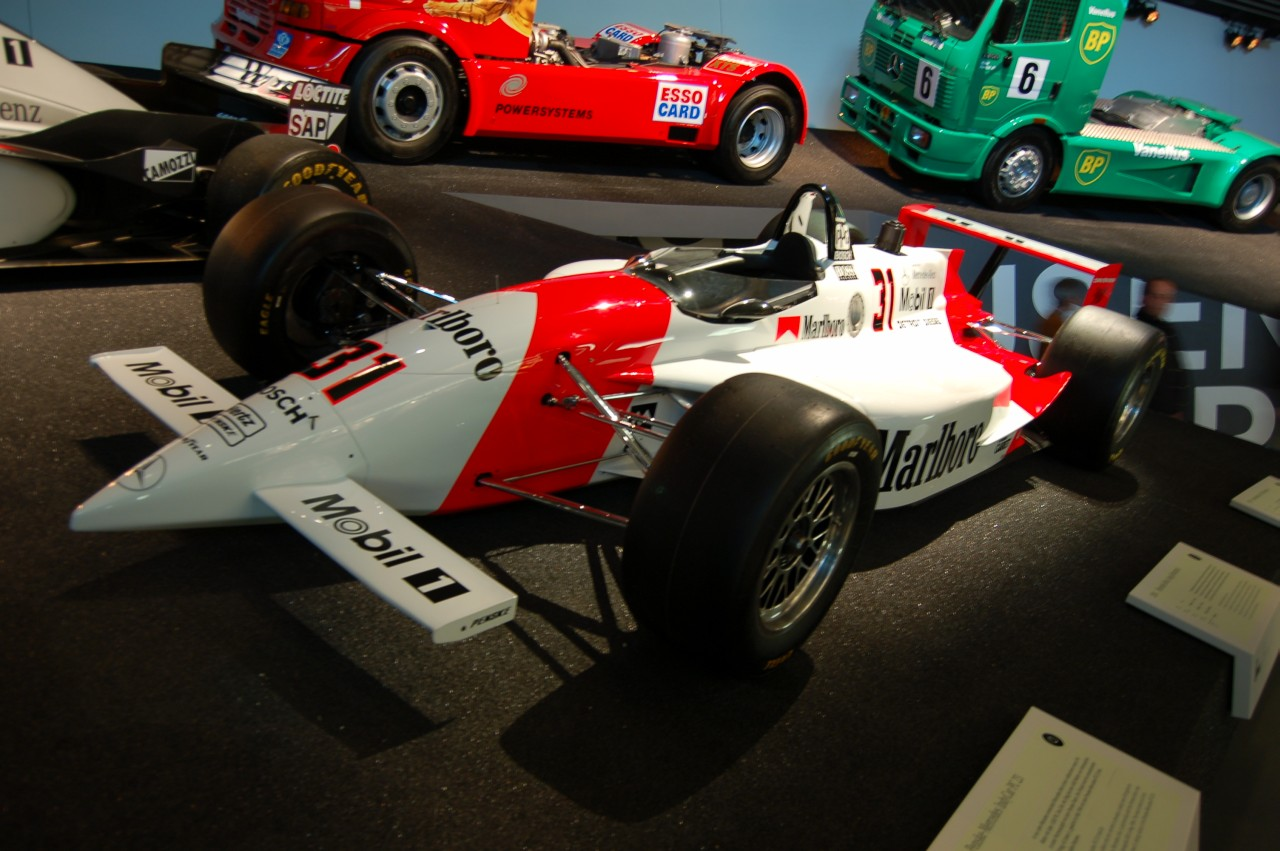
Penske-Mercedes IndyCar in the Mercedes-Benz Museum

In 1994, Al Unser Jr. won the Indianapolis 500 with a Penske-Mercedes IndyCar. The engines were developed and built by Ilmor, but were badged as Mercedes-Benz. Ilmor which, realizing that a loophole in the rules for production-based engines would include any pushrod engine, built a very unusual purpose-built pushrod engine with a significant power advantage. This was done knowing that the "forgotten" loophole would be closed immediately after they took advantage of it, and so the engine would in fact be usable only for this single race.

Starting from 1995, Daimler AG entered the CART IndyCar World Series full-time via the Mercedes-Benz brand by rebranding the Ilmor engines. They achieved six wins in their first full season, also reaching second in the Drivers' Championship powering Al Unser Jr. After a dry spell in 1996, Mercedes-Benz came back in 1997 with nine wins and won the Manufacturers' Championship. However, a lack of competitive results in the following seasons and the CART/IRL split meant Mercedes gradually lost interest and the German manufacturer shut down its CART Champ Car operations at the end of the 2000 season as DaimlerChrysler re-allocate their resources for NASCAR Winston Cup Series from 2001 onwards via the Dodge brand (Mercedes-Benz and Dodge were sister brands at the time as well as R5P7 engines were also helped development by Mercedes-Benz). In total, Mercedes achieved 18 wins and one driver runner-up finish in the CART championship (Al Unser Jr. in 1995).

=== Formula Three ===
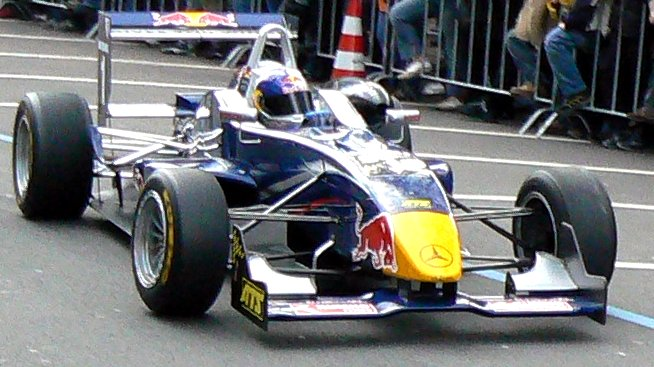
Sebastian Vettel driving a Mercedes-engined F3 car (2006)

In the five years since Mercedes-Benz began its involvement in Formula Three, it has developed into the formula's most dominant engine supplier. Its engines, which are built and serviced by H.W.A GmbH, have so far contributed to a total of four drivers' and four teams' championship titles in the Formula Three Euroseries and British Formula Three Championship.

The H.W.A Mercedes-AMG M271 was based on a 1.8 litre 4-cylinder from the C-Klasse, bored out to the regulation 2.0 litre capacity. Formula Three engine regulations demand a naturally aspirated, 4-stroke, 4-cylinder, production-based specification, with a capacity of not more than 2,000 cc. The M271 made its competitive debut in the 2002 German Formula 3 Championship in two of Mücke Motorsport's three Dallara F302 chassis, driven by Markus Winkelhock and Marcel Lasse. Winkelhock achieved Mercedes' first F3 win at the Nürburgring in August 2002.

In 2003, Mercedes expanded its Formula Three program by supplying three teams in the inaugural year of the F3 Euroseries. Its engine powered the seven cars of Mücke Motorsport, Team Kolles, and ASM Formule 3. Speiss-Opel was dominant, thanks in part to Ryan Briscoe and Prema Powerteam, but Mercedes was winning by the eighth round. Its most notable win was provided by Christian Klien at Zandvoort in the non-championship Marlboro Masters.

Between 2004 and 2006, Mercedes-powered cars dominated the drivers' and teams' championships in the Euroseries, due in part to its close relationship with ASM Formule 3, which is one of France's most successful F3 teams. During that period, it brought drivers' titles for Jamie Green, Lewis Hamilton, and Paul di Resta. 2006 also saw Mercedes' first participation in the British F3 Championship, when it partnered with Räikkönen Robertson Racing, co-owned by Kimi Räikkönen, and two other teams. Double R Racing's lead driver, Mike Conway, dominated the championship. In the 2007 British F3 season, Mercedes powered the majority of the Championship field.

=== Rally ===
In 1977, four W123 280E's entered by dealerships participated in the 1977 London–Sydney Marathon, taking a 1-2 finish and also sixth and eighth places. Based on this, Mercedes-Benz considered an entry in the rally. However, in order to keep winning against lighter Fiat and Ford cars with a better power-to-weight ratio, a more powerful vehicle would be required, thus the C107 450 SLC 5.0 was developed.

In 1978, led by engineer Erich Waxenberger who had created the legendary 300 SEL 6.3, Mercedes-Benz participated in the 28,600 kilometer Vuelta a La América del Sud in South America with four 280Es and four 450 SLC 5.0's. All but one of the 450 SLCs (driven by Rubén Daray) finished, and Mercedes scored a 1-2-3-4-5 finish, plus ninth and tenth places. The same year, a Kenyan Mercedes-Benz dealer, D.T. Dobie of Nairobi entered the Safari Rally with four entrants, all driving 280Es. Only Sobiesław Zasada finished (in sixth place), Joginder Singh, Andrew Cowan and Tony Fowkes were forced to retire. In 1979, Dobie entered the Safari Rally with both 280Es and also 450 SLC 5.0's. Hannu Mikkola in a 450 SLC 5.0 came second, losing to Shekhar Mehta by 48 minutes, whilst Cowan came fourth in a 280E, Björn Waldegård came sixth in a 450SLC 5.0 and Singh in a 280E came 11th; Vic Preston Jr (450 SLC 5.0) and Zasada (280E) were forced to retire. However, in the Rallye Côte d'Ivoire in November, Mikkola, Waldegård, Cowan and Preston scored a 1-2-3-4 victory on 450 SLC 5.0's.

However, the heavier and bigger Benzes were unable to replicate the success in the shorter European rallies. In the Acropolis Rally, they shredded their tires, and its only European points finishes came from the narrow roads of Portugal, with Waldegård and Ingvar Carlsson coming in fourth and fifth behind the more nimble Fiat 131 Abarths. While in Argentina, Mikkola came in second behind Walter Röhrl; in Safari Rally, that played to the SLC's strengths, due to rear suspension failures, Preston only managed to come in third place, with Cowan in sixth and Waldegård in tenth; in New Zealand, Mikkola came third and Waldegård fifth; and in the Ivory Coast, Waldegård and Jorge Recalde scored a 1-2. Overall, Mercedes-Benz finished the season in fourth place, behind Fiat, Datsun and Ford. With Daimler management deciding that anything less than total victory was bad publicity and not worth the risk or expenditure, the works team was disbanded by the end of 1980.

For 1981, Waxenberger had managed to lure over the 1980 World Champion Walter Röhrl to drive a new 500SL-based rally car, who however, expressed disappointment while testing the car, believing it would not be competitive against the increasingly more specialized Audis and Lancias, thus it never raced.

Mercedes then set off to build a new rally car based on the new W201, so they turned to British engineering firm Cosworth for assistance. Cosworth built the 16-valve version of the M102 engine, however, with the success of four-wheel drive turbocharged Audi Quattro, the W201 would have never stood a chance, leading to the rally entrance being scrapped. However, Mercedes then decided to race the W201 instead in DTM, and was successful there.

== Factory drivers ==
=== Current ===
- (Estonia) Ralf Aron
- (Austria) Lucas Auer
- (United Kingdom) Adam Christodoulou
- (Switzerland) Philip Ellis
- (Germany) Maro Engel
- (Germany) Maximilian Götz
- (France) Jules Gounon
- (Canada) Mikaël Grenier
- (Italy) Andrea Kimi Antonelli
- (Germany) Thomas Jäger
- (Spain) Daniel Juncadella
- (Australia) Jordan Love
- (India) Arjun Maini
- (Canada) Daniel Morad
- (Germany) Jusuf Owega
- (United Kingdom) George Russell
- (Germany) Fabian Schiller
- (Germany) Bernd Schneider
- (Germany) David Schumacher
- (Germany) Luca Stolz

== Racing vehicles ==
Year	Vehicle	Image	Category
1928	Mercedes-Benz SSK		Sports Car
1934	Mercedes-Benz W25		Grand Prix
1937	Mercedes-Benz Stromlinienwagen		Grand Prix
1937	Mercedes-Benz W125		Grand Prix
1937	Mercedes-Benz W125 Rekordwagen		Land Speed Record
1938	Mercedes-Benz W154		Grand Prix
1939	Mercedes-Benz T80		Land Speed Record
1939	Mercedes-Benz W165		Voiturette
1952	Mercedes-Benz W194		Endurance racing
1954	Mercedes-Benz W196		Formula One
1955	Mercedes-Benz 300 SLR		Sports Car
1979	Mercedes-Benz 450		Group 4
1980	Mercedes-Benz 500		Group 4
1991	Mercedes-Benz C11		Group C2
1991	Mercedes-Benz C291		Group C1
1991	Mercedes-Benz C292		Group C1
1992	Mercedes-Benz Actros 1935 AK		Group T5
1992	Mercedes-Benz Actros 1936 AK		Group T5
1992	Unimog U1550 L37		Group T5
1993	Mercedes-Benz 190E		Class 1
1993	Mercedes-Benz 190E 2.3-16/Evolution/Evolution II		Group A
1993	Mercedes-Benz Actros 2635 AK		Group T5
1993	Mercedes-Benz Actros 2636 AK		Group T5
1994	Mercedes-Benz C-Class		Class 1
1997	Mercedes-Benz Actros 1844 AK		Group T5
1997	Mercedes-Benz CLK GTR		Group GT1
1998	Mercedes-Benz CLK LM		Group GT1
1999	Mercedes-Benz CLR		LMGTP
2004	Unimog U400		Group T5
2004	Unimog U500		Group T5
2007	Mercedes-Benz Axor 1833 AK 4x4		Group T5
2010	Mercedes MGP W01		Formula One
2011	Mercedes MGP W02		Formula One
2011	Mercedes-Benz SLS AMG GT3		Group GT3
2012	Mercedes F1 W03		Formula One
2013	Mercedes F1 W04		Formula One
2013	Mercedes-Benz E63 AMG		New Generation V8 Supercar
2014	Mercedes F1 W05 Hybrid		Formula One
2014	Mercedes-Benz A-Class		NGTC
2015	Mercedes F1 W06 Hybrid		Formula One
2016	Mercedes F1 W07 Hybrid		Formula One
2016	Mercedes-AMG GT3		Group GT3
2017	Mercedes AMG F1 W08 EQ Power+		Formula One
2017	Mercedes-AMG GT4		SRO GT4
2018	Mercedes AMG F1 W09 EQ Power+		Formula One
2019	Mercedes AMG F1 W10 EQ Power+		Formula One
2019	Mercedes-Benz EQ Silver Arrow 01		Formula E
2020	Mercedes-AMG F1 W11 EQ Performance		Formula One
2020	Mercedes-EQ Silver Arrow 02		Formula E
2021	Mercedes W12		Formula One
2022	Mercedes W13		Formula One
2023	Mercedes W14		Formula One
2023	Mercedes-AMG GT2		SRO GT2
2024	Mercedes W15		Formula One
2025	Mercedes W16		Formula One
2026	Mercedes AMG A35 Saloon		NGTC
2026	Mercedes W17		Formula One

== See also ==
- Silver Arrows
- Mercedes-Benz Grand Prix results
- Mercedes-AMG
- Mercedes AMG High Performance Powertrains
