= Mercedes-Benz T80 =

Land speed record vehicle

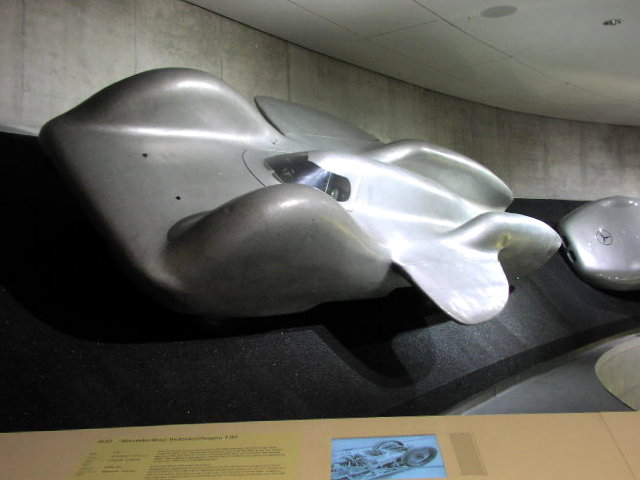
- T80 on display at the Mercedes-Benz Museum in Stuttgart

Overview
- Manufacturer: Mercedes-Benz
- Model code: Type 80
- Also called: Mercedes-Benz Weltrekordwagen T80
- Production: 1939 (1 made)
- Assembly: Stuttgart, Germany
- Designer: Ferdinand Porsche

Body and chassis
- Class: Land Speed Record
- Layout: Mid engine, 4 Wheel Drive (6×4)
- Related: Mercedes Silver Arrows; Mercedes-Benz W125 Rekordwagen

Powertrain
- Engine: 44,520 cubic centimetres (2,717 cu in; 44.52 L) Daimler-Benz DB 603 Supercharged V12
- Power output: 3,452 brake horsepower (3,500 PS; 2,574 kW) @ 3,000 rpm 4,352 newton-metres (3,210 lbf⋅ft) @ 1,500 rpm
- Transmission: Single Speed Direct Drive

Dimensions
- Wheelbase: 5,128 millimetres (201.9 in)
- Length: 8,128 millimetres (320.0 in)
- Width: (body without wings): 1,753 millimetres (69.0 in) (body with wings): 3,200 millimetres (130 in)
- Height: 1,245 millimetres (49.0 in)
- Kerb weight: 2,896 kilograms (6,385 lb)

Chronology
- Predecessor: Mercedes-Benz W125 Rekordwagen

The Mercedes-Benz T80 was a six-wheeled vehicle built by Mercedes-Benz, developed and designed by Ferdinand Porsche in the late 1930s. It was intended to break the world land speed record, but never made the attempt, due to the project having been overtaken by the outbreak of World War II.

== Background ==
World-renowned German auto racer Hans Stuck's pet project was to take the world land speed record and he convinced Mercedes-Benz to build a special racing car for the attempt. Officially supported by Adolf Hitler (a race car fan influenced by Stuck), the project was started in 1937. Automotive designer Dr Ferdinand Porsche first targeted a speed of 550 km/h (342 mph), but after George Eyston's and John Cobb's successful LSR runs of 1938 and 1939 the target speed was raised to 600 km/h (373 mph). By late 1939, when the project was finished, the target speed was a much higher 750 km/h (466 mph). This would also be the first attempt at the absolute land speed record on German soil, Hitler envisioned the T80 as another propaganda triumph of German technological superiority to be witnessed by all the world, courtesy of German television. The same Autobahn course had already been proven ideal for record-breaking in smaller capacity classes, Britain's Goldie Gardner having exceeded 200 mph (322 km/h) there in a 1,500 cc MG.

== Power ==
The massive 44.5 litre Daimler-Benz DB 603 inverted V12 was selected to power the record-setting car. The engine was an increased displacement derivative of the famous DB-601 aircraft engine that powered the Messerschmitt Bf 109 fighter in production at the time, with the DB 603 ending up as the largest displacement inverted V12 aviation engine in production for Germany during the World War II years. The DB-603 fitted was just the third prototype (V3) engine of this variant and tuned up to 3,452 hp (2,574 kW; 3,500 PS), roughly twice the power of the Bf 109 or the Supermarine Spitfire. The engine ran on a special mixture of methyl alcohol (63%), benzene (16%), ethanol (12%), acetone (4.4%), nitrobenzene (2.2%), avgas (2%), and ether (0.4%) with MW (methanol-water) injection for charge cooling and as an anti-detonant.

== Construction ==
The difficulty of the challenge was met with money and engineering genius. By 1939, the T80 was fully completed at a cost of RM 600,000. The car was over 8 m (26 ft) long, had three axles with two of them driven, weighed over 2.7 metric tons (three short tons), and produced 3,452 hp (2,574 kW; 3,500 PS) together with the aerodynamics of specialist Josef Mickl to attain a projected speed of 750 km/h (466 mph). Aerodynamically, the T80 incorporated a Porsche-designed enclosed cockpit, low sloping bonnet, rounded wings, and elongated tail booms. Midway down the body were two small wings to provide downforce and ensure stability - these wings were inspired by the wings of Fritz von Opel's Opel-RAK from 1928. The heavily streamlined twin-tailed body (forming the fairings for each pair of tandem rear wheels) achieved a drag coefficient of 0.18, an astonishingly low figure for any vehicle.

== Projections for the 1940 land speed record attempt ==
As ambitiously planned, Hans Stuck would have driven the T80 over a special stretch of the Reichsautobahn Berlin — Halle/Leipzig, which passed south of Dessau (now part of the modern A9 Autobahn) between the modern A9 exits 11 and 12, which was 25 m (82 ft) wide and almost 10 km (6 mi) long with the median paved over as the Dessauer Rennstrecke (Dessau racetrack). The date was set for the January 1940 "RekordWoche" (Record Week), but the war begun on September 1, 1939 prevented the T80 run. In 1939, the vehicle had been unofficially nicknamed Schwarzer Vogel (Black Bird) by Adolf Hitler and was to be painted in German nationalistic colours, complete with German eagle and Nazi swastika, but the event was cancelled and the T80 garaged.

== War and after the war ==
The DB 603 engine was subsequently removed during the war while the vehicle was moved to safety and storage in Kärnten, Austria (now called Carinthia). The T80 survived the war and was eventually moved into the Mercedes-Benz Museum in Stuttgart for permanent display.

== Current status ==
The T80 is currently on display at the Mercedes-Benz Museum in Stuttgart-Bad Cannstatt.

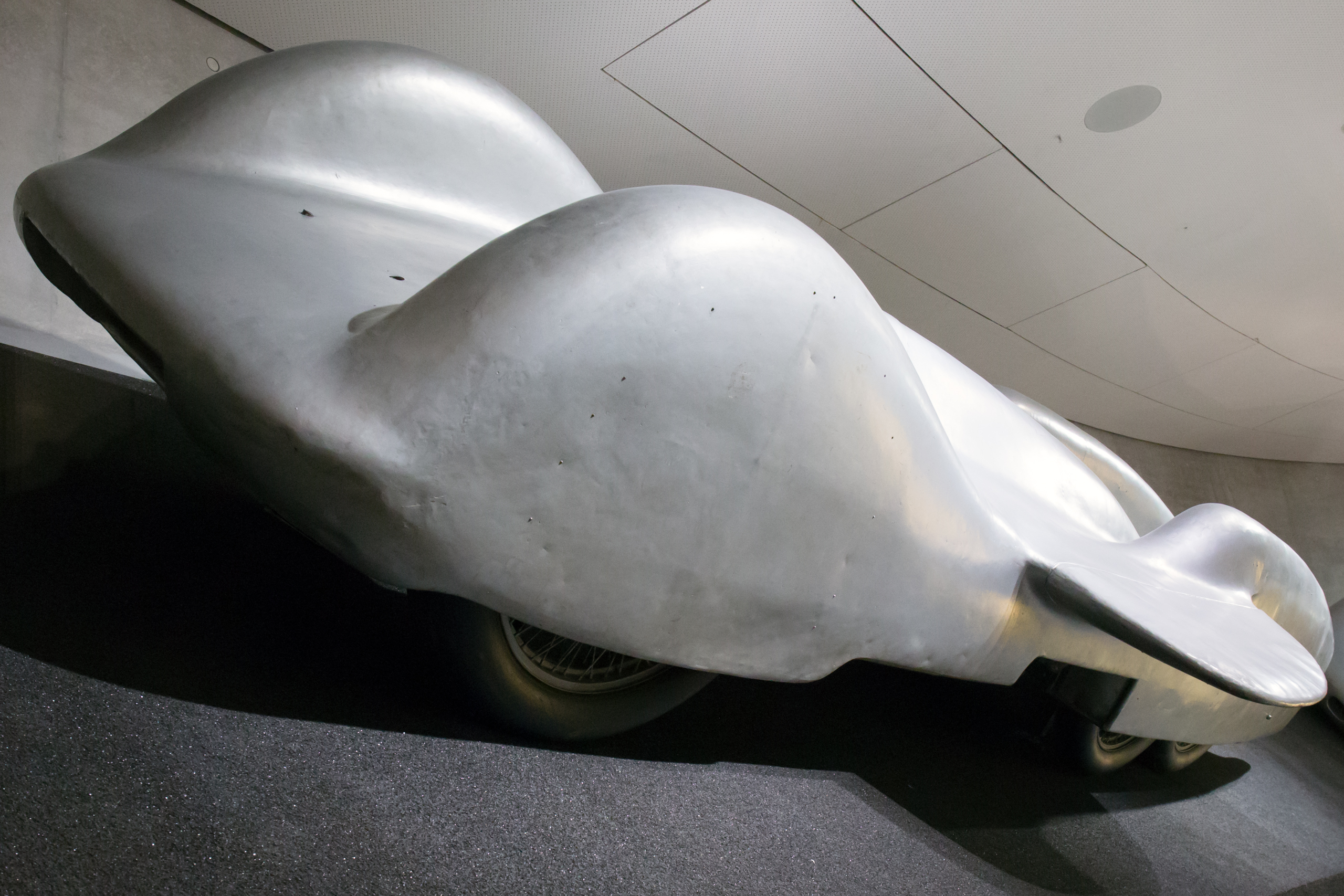
Lower view

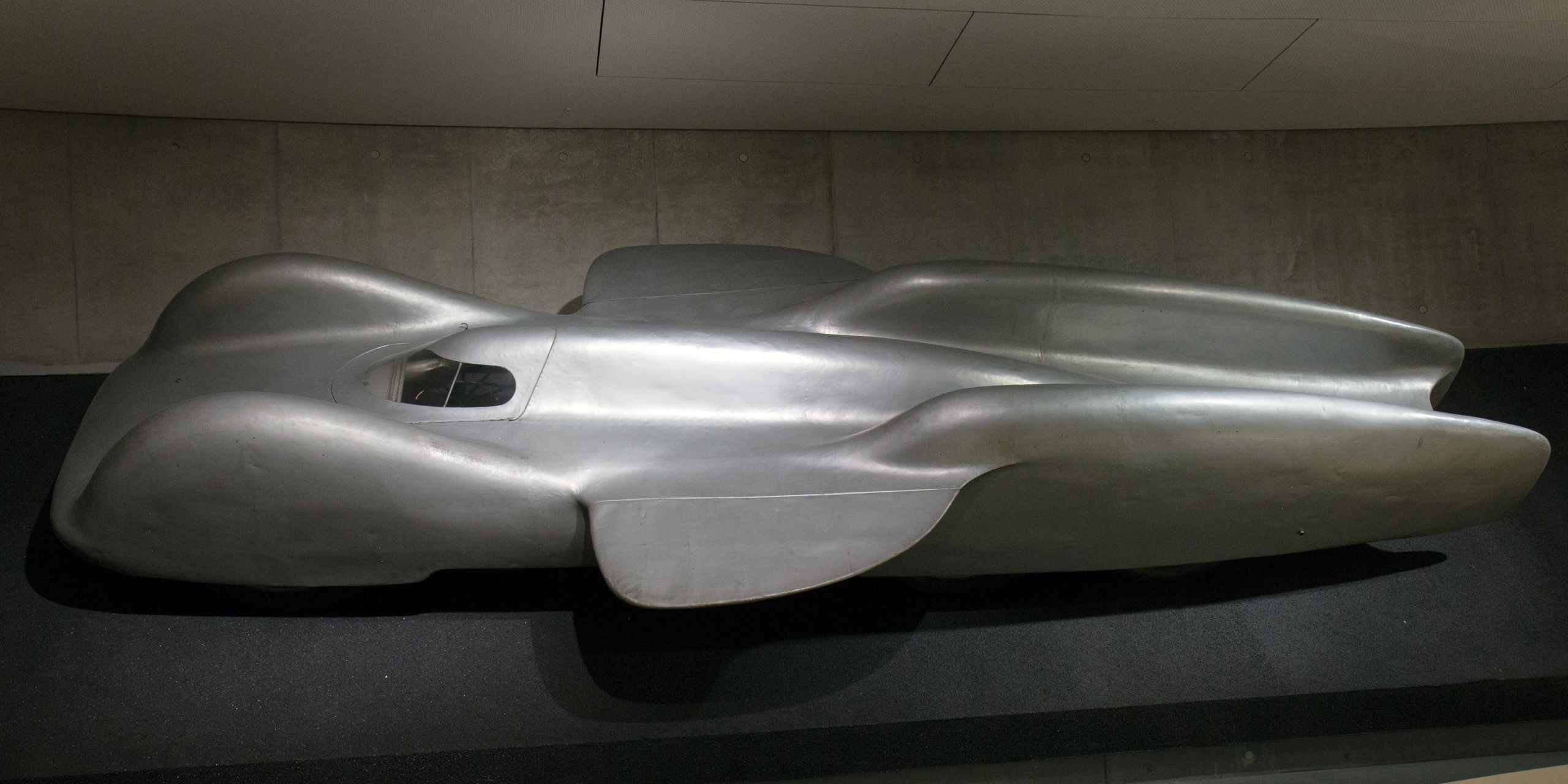
Side view

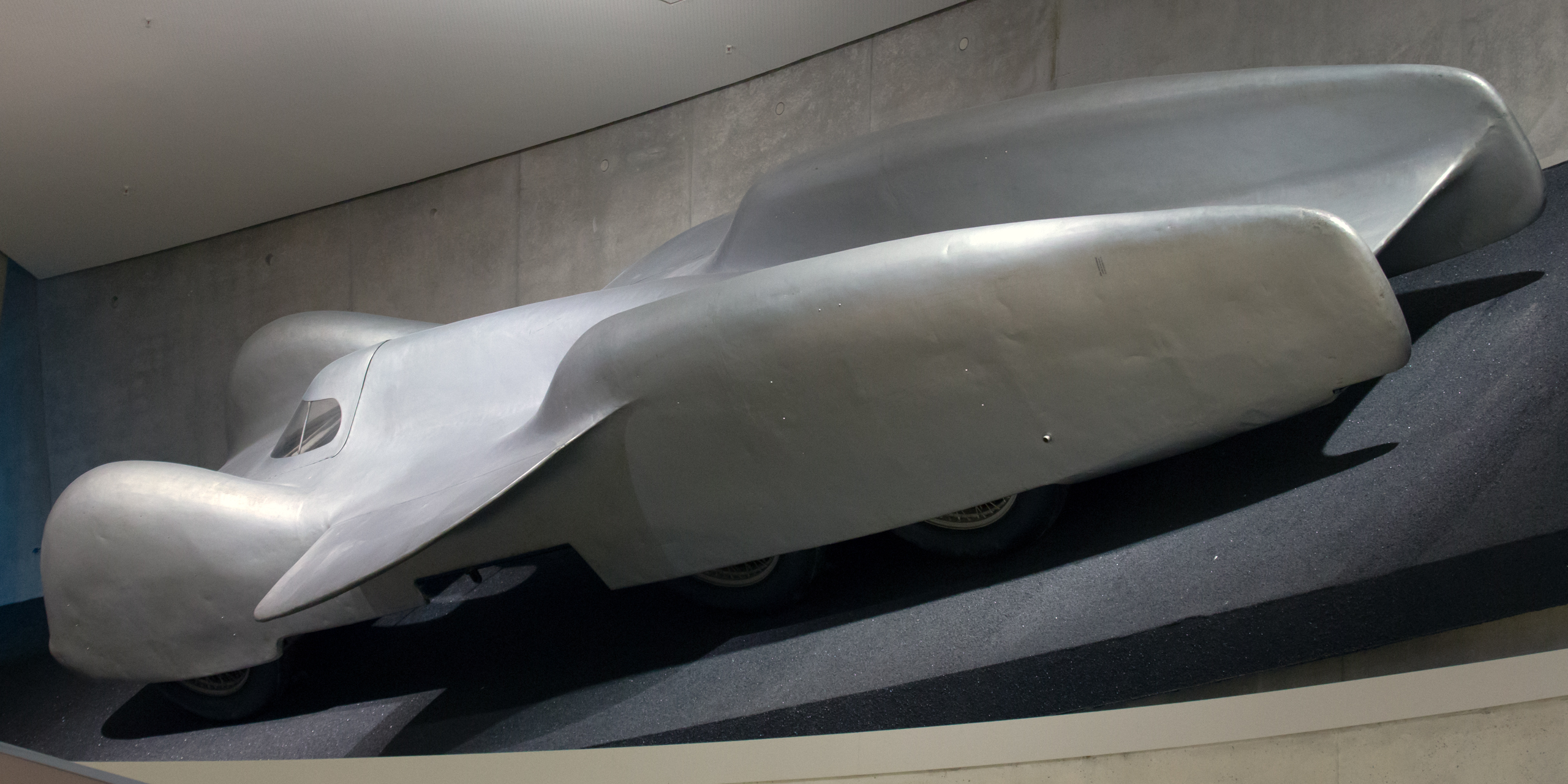
Rear view

== See also ==
- Daimler-Benz DB 603
