= Mercedes-Benz Stromlinienwagen =

Racing car designed by Rudolf Uhlenhaut

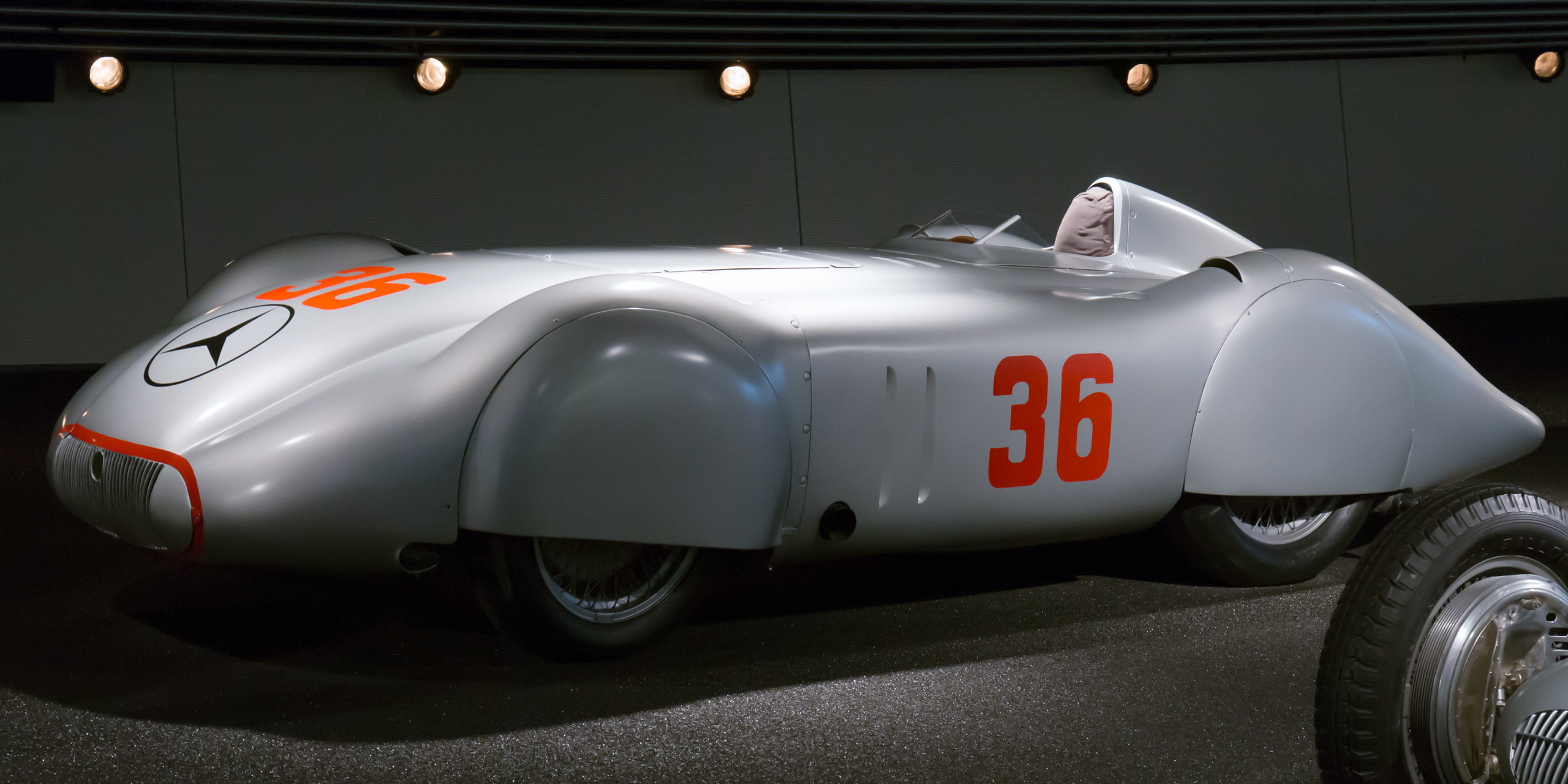
- Category: Grand Prix
- Constructor: Mercedes-Benz
- Designer(s): Max Sailer; Albert Heess; Max Wagner; Rudolf Uhlenhaut
- Predecessor: Mercedes-Benz W125
- Successor: Mercedes-Benz W154

Technical specifications
- Chassis: Tubular frame
- Suspension (front): Independent suspension with wishbones, coil springs, hydraulic shock absorbers
- Suspension (rear): De Dion axle, torsion bars, hydraulic shock absorbers
- Engine: Mercedes-Benz M125/ATM 5.6-litre Straight-8/V-12 supercharged FR
- Transmission: Mercedes-Benz 4-speed synchronized manual
- Fuel: Methanol/benzole blend

Competition history
- Notable entrants: Daimler-Benz AG
- Notable drivers: Manfred von Brauchitsch; Rudolf Caracciola; Hermann Lang; Richard Seaman
- Debut: 1937 AVUS Grand Prix
Races	Wins	Poles	F/Laps
1	1	0	1
- Drivers' Championships: 0

The Mercedes-Benz Stromlinienwagen was a Formula Libre race car designed by Mercedes-Benz for the 1937 AVUS Grand Prix.

== History ==
The AVUS Grand Prix was an event contested on the AVUS circuit/motorway, consisting of two long straights and two bends. This race was run under Formula Libre regulations, namely, no weight or power limit for the engine.

In order to obtain the best possible results and take advantage of the long straights, Mercedes rebodied three of its cars according to the "Streamline" style. Three chassis were selected for this modification. The first, entered in the race under number 35 and entrusted to Rudolf Caracciola was a W125 equipped with its original M125 engine. The second, entered in the race under number 36 and entrusted to Manfred von Brauchitsch was a W25K in which a 736 hp DAB engine had been installed. The last, entered in the race under number 37 and entrusted to Hermann Lang was a W25 equipped with an M125 engine. Two other cars completed the Mercedes armada: number 38 was a W125 in original configuration entered in the hands of Richard Seaman and number 39, a W25 equipped with a DAB engine, entrusted to Goffredo Zehender.

Hermann Lang won the race with the W25-M125.

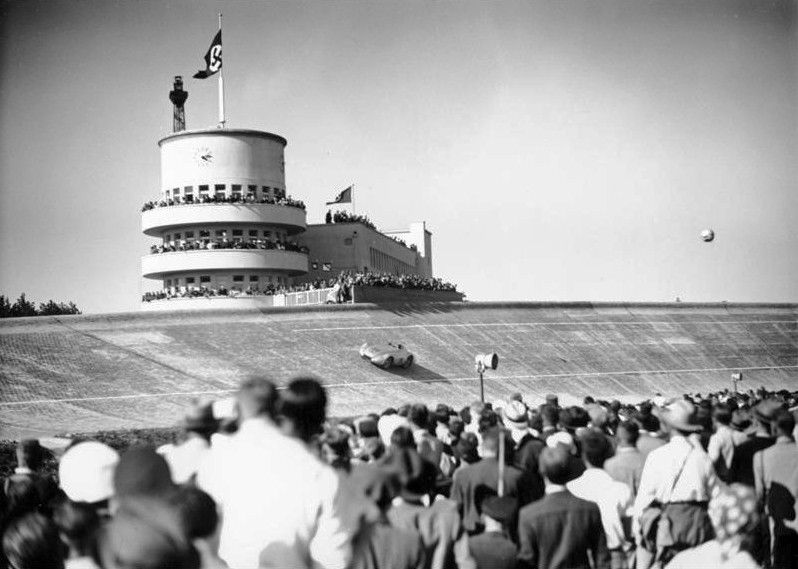
Manfred von Brauchitsch in a Mercedes-Benz Stromlinienwagen on the Avus North Loop in 1937
