= Mercedes-Benz W125 Rekordwagen =

Late 1930s experimental high-speed automobile

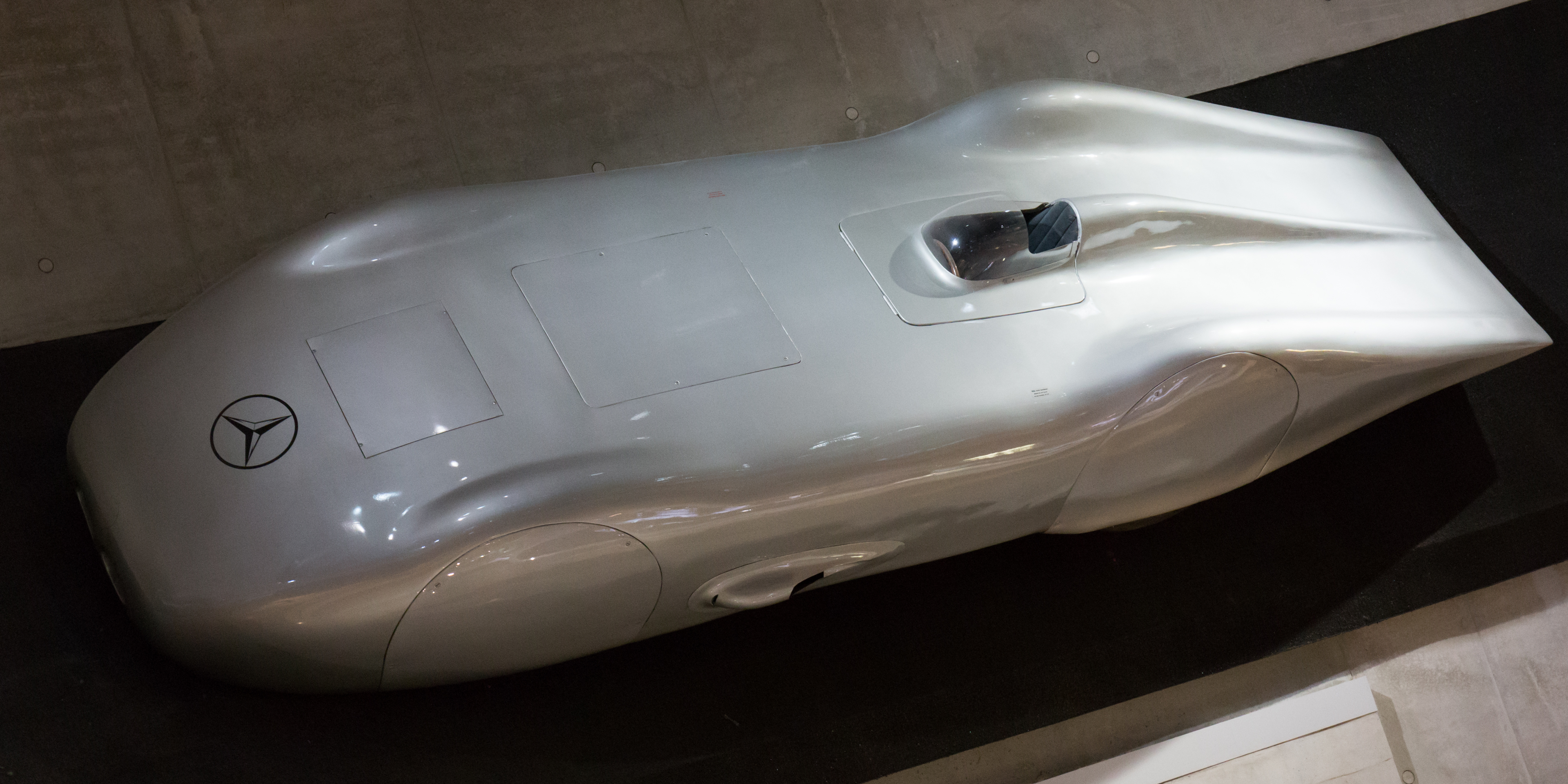
- The W125 Rekordwagen on display at the Mercedes-Benz Museum in Stuttgart, Germany.

Overview
- Type: Experimental, high-speed automobile
- Manufacturer: Mercedes Benz
- Production: 1937

Powertrain
- Engine: MD 25 DAB/3 60 Degree V12

The Mercedes-Benz W125 Rekordwagen was an experimental, high-speed automobile produced in the late 1930s. The streamlined car was derived from the 1937 open-wheel race car Mercedes-Benz W125 Formel-Rennwagen, of which also a streamlined version was raced at the non-championship Avusrennen in Berlin.

Driven by Rudolf Caracciola and powered by a 563 kW (765 PS; 755 hp) V12, the car set a record of 432.7 km/h (268.9 mph) over the flying kilometre on 28 January 1938. This remained the highest speed officially timed on a public road for almost 80 years.

== History ==
The main difference from the Formel-Rennwagen Grand Prix race car, which had to adhere to the 750 kg (1,653 lb) limit, was the engine. While the GP car had the 8-cylinder inline M125, which was rather tall, the record car was fitted with a V12 engine that was lower, which reduced drag.

Given that the first version of the newly built 12-cylinder record-breaking car based on the W 125 Grand Prix car had clearly failed to meet its intended targets at the premiere of "Record Week" at the end of October 1937, the unfortunate situation arose for Daimler-Benz that, under the given circumstances, the next opportunity for rehabilitation did not open up until autumn 1938 - more than six months after the International Automobile and Motorcycle Exhibition (IAMA), the most important showcase for the domestic automotive industry. Under no circumstances did they want to appear there as losers.

Daimler-Benz managed to get the NSKK leadership to specify a date for the next record week that was still before the IAMA. As early as the end of January 1938, the intention was to compete with a new, heavily revised version of the W 125 record-breaking car.

Its power unit had already offered no reason for complaint in the unsuccessful performance of 1937. Designed from 1935 onwards by engineer Albert Heess, the nearly 5.6-litre V12 engine, designated MD 25 DAB, was quite heavy due to the adherence to the traditional design of Mercedes-Benz racing engines with steel cylinders and welded-on sheet steel cooling jackets, but a lack of power was not its problem.

It made 31 copies of it and Mercedes later sold it to specific customers and kept the last copy in its museum in Stuttgart.

The same engine, with serial number 3, underwent only a few modifications for the new runs at the end of January 1938. In addition to some minor measures to increase mechanical stability, detailed improvements were made to the mixture supply system in the short time available. According to internal records, these resulted in a further increase in power to around 765 hp/563 kW at the same rated speed of 5800 rpm.

During the 1937 record week, the visually harmonious fully streamlined body of the W 125 record-breaking car had lacked aerodynamic efficiency. Reason enough for the responsible Daimler-Benz employees to call in external expertise on this issue. Shortly after the 1937 record week, the existing good contacts to renowned representatives of the German aircraft industry and the German Aviation Research Institute (DVL) were activated in order to obtain appropriate advice from them.

The presentation of the car that had failed in the October led aerodynamics experts to identify a number of shortcomings in its body design. It was agreed that a rounded front-end design was useful in principle, but it was felt that the car body as a whole, and especially between the front wheels, was too high. The rear ought also to be longer and taper off in a more flowing shape to generate more downforce. In addition, a new, more teardrop-shaped design of the cockpit windscreen was advised. The DVL experts also brought up the suggestion of ice cooling for the twelve-cylinder power unit. For record runs over short distances, this made it possible to dispense with a classic coolant radiator, which always had a negative impact on the aerodynamic balance due to its cooling air requirements and the necessary openings.

When the new version of the W 125 record-breaking car was completed in January 1938, it was obvious at first glance that the Mercedes-Benz developers had taken the suggestions of the aerodynamics experts to heart and created a consistently aerodynamic body. The now significantly lowered front end of the car produced much higher downforce values, which resulted in better driving stability. Instead of the large cooling air opening of the previous year's version, there were now two small elongated round holes designed exclusively to supply intake air to the carburettors. Overall, the body had been shortened by 80 mm at the front, while it had been lengthened by 500 mm at the rear in order to achieve the flowing lines tapering towards the rear that the experts had suggested. The cockpit windscreen also presented itself as completely streamlined and rounded. Another striking feature was the slight waistline of the body, which offered a smaller target for the dreaded crosswind.

The day of truth came on 28 January 1938. Now the heavily revised W 125 record-breaking car had to prove its capability. Even on his first morning test run, Rudolf Caracciola was spontaneously thrilled by the car's tracking stability, and the V12 engine also delivered its full power. Apparently even the dome-like cockpit windscreen, which was strongly raked back and which he had resisted until now, did not cause him any visibility problems. When he set off on the first record-breaking run at 8 a.m., it quickly became clear that he would be pushing into new dimensions of speed. Averaging the outbound and inbound legs, the type of measurement prescribed by the regulations, Caracciola achieved a sensational 432.692 km/h over the kilometre and 432.361 km/h over the mile, both with a flying start. The absolute top speed on the return run was recorded as 437 km/h.

Auto Union tried to break this new Mercedes-Benz record on the same day. But Bernd Rosemeyer, the most successful racing driver of the rival company, was killed in an accident during the attempt. His vehicle was caught by a gust of wind at full speed and pushed off the road.

For almost eight decades, this speed record set by Caracciola on a public road remained. It was not until 4 November 2017 that the record was beaten by around 8 km/h and increased to 445.54 km/h. The vehicle used in that case had almost twice the engine power. This means that the Mercedes-Benz W 125 record-breaking car is also a prime example of efficiency to this day. Not only these legendary world records, but also measurements carried out decades later in a state-of-the-art wind tunnel provided proof that the development work carried out under the greatest time pressure had been a complete success. According to the latest measuring methods, the newly designed body of the 12-cylinder record-breaking car from 1938 had a drag coefficient of only Cd = 0.157, which is impressive even by today's standards. The car is on display in the Mercedes-Benz Museum in Stuttgart.

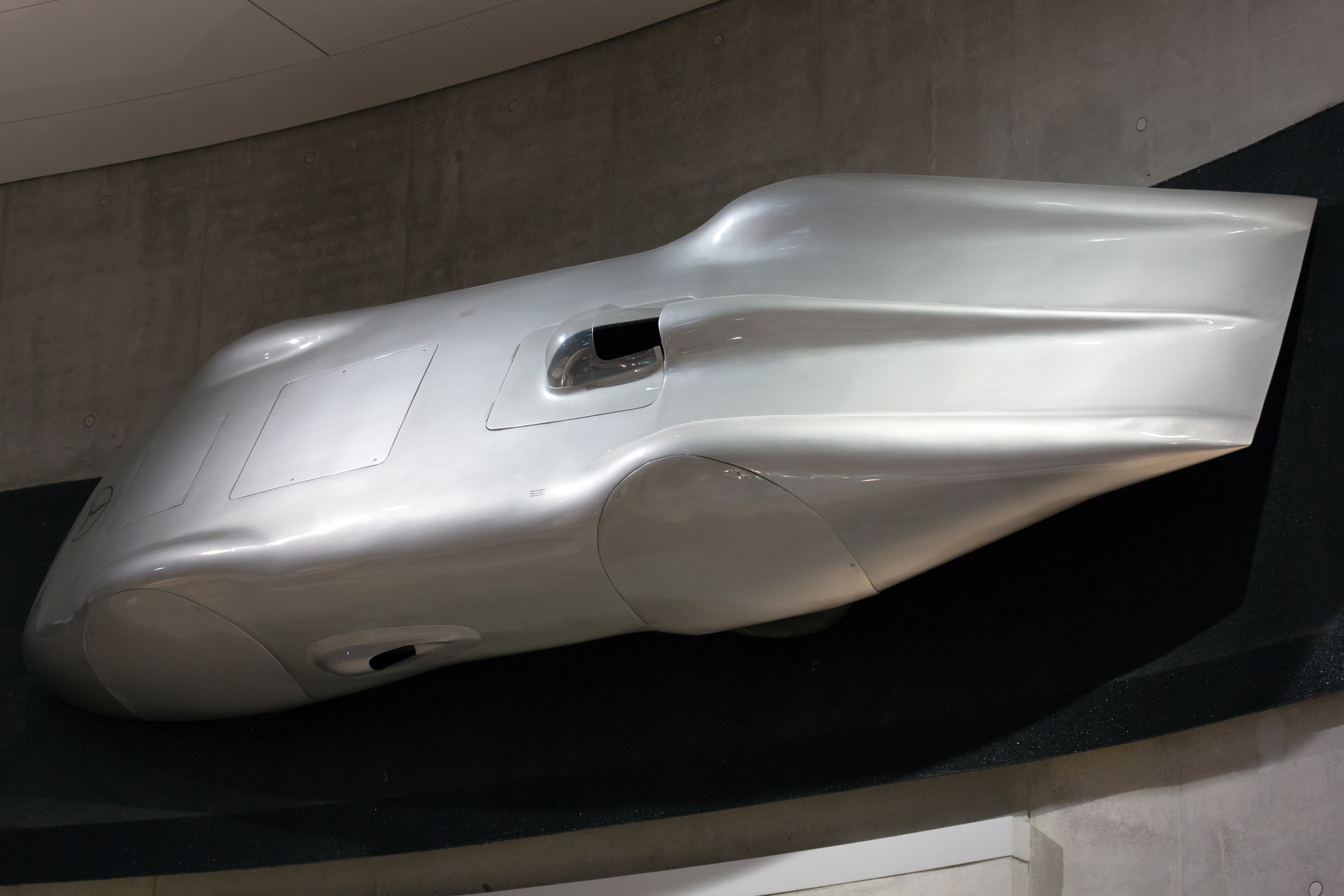
Mercedes-Benz W125 Rekordwagen rear-left Mercedes-Benz Museum

== 1937 Mercedes-Benz W125 Rekordwagen specifications ==
- Engine: MD 25 DAB/3 60 Degree V12
- Engine position: Front longitudinal
- Aspiration: Twin Roots superchargers
- Valvetrain: DOHC 4 valves per cylinder
- Displacement: 5577 cc / 340 in³ (82.0 x 88.0 mm)
- Compression: 9.17:1
- Power: 563 kW (765 PS; 755 hp) @ 5800 rpm
- Power/displacement 131.97 PS (97.06 kW; 130.16 hp) per litre
- Power/weight: 621.1 PS (456.8 kW; 612.6 hp) per tonne
- Transmission: 4-speed manual
- Engine cooling: Ice supplemented normal coolant as air intakes were kept very small to improve aerodynamic flow over and around the car

== The record ==
Rudolf Caracciola's record of 432.7 km/h (268.9 mph) over the flying kilometre on 28 January 1938, remained the fastest ever officially timed speed on a public road until broken on 5 November 2017 by Koenigsegg in an Agera RS driven by Niklas Lilja, achieving 447.2 km/h (277.9 mph) on a closed highway in Nevada. It also was the fastest speed ever recorded in Germany until Rico Anthes bested it with a Top Fuel Dragster on the Hockenheimring drag strip.

This record breaking run was made on the Reichs-Autobahn A5 between Frankfurt and Darmstadt, where onlookers were rattled by the brutal boom of the side spewing exhaust stacks as the silver car hurtled past. By nine that morning, Caracciola and team chief Alfred Neubauer were having a celebration breakfast at the Park Hotel in Frankfurt. Limited copies were made of them and were later sold for various auctions, and Mercedes kept the copy in its museum in Stuttgart.

Popular driver Bernd Rosemeyer was killed later the same day when trying to beat that record for Auto Union. This also put an end to the record attempts of Mercedes, even though Hans Stuck later wanted to beat the overall land speed record with the Porsche-designed Mercedes-Benz T80 which was powered by a 3,000 horsepower (2,200 kW) airplane engine.
