= Mercedes-Benz W195 =

1950 Formula One concept car

Mercedes-Benz W195 was a concept for a Formula One racing car studied by Mercedes-Benz during the 1950 and 1951 F1 seasons, with the intend to test in 1952 and to compete in 1953.

A very similar predecessor was the 1500cc supercharged V8 Mercedes-Benz W165, developed according to Voiturette rules, to win the 1939 Tripoli Grand Prix, which it did. Only two chassis were made, and only one was in possession of Daimler-Benz after the war. Building new W165 cars after 1939 blueprints was no option, they at best would reach parity, not the desired superiority to achieve successes.

By mid-1951, the recently established FIA drivers World Championship was in a crisis due to lack of competitive F1 cars, either with 1500cc supercharged engines, or 4500cc without supercharger. Only Alfa Romeo and Ferrari had competitive models, and Alfa wanted to pull out their Alfa Romeo 158/159 Alfetta that had been designed in the late 1930s. Thus, the 1952 and 1953 World Championships seasons were run under Formula Two regulations, with 2000cc engines, and few competition for Ferrari. When this became known in September 1951, the W195 project was cancelled. Funding was transferred to the Mercedes-Benz W196 project, to be built for the new 2500cc rules that came in effect for 1954. This car was an instant success, and won also in 1955.

Concurrently to F1 considerations, the six cylinder engines of the new Mercedes-Benz W186 300 sedan and coupe models were used to developed a space frame chassis for Sports car racing. The Mercedes-Benz W194 300 SL was raced in 1952 with great success, winning 1952 Le Mans and the Carrera Panamericana, successes which opened the North American market for the German brand. A roadgoing version was sold from 1954 onwards as the Mercedes-Benz W198 300 SL Gullwing.

== Background ==
In the 1930s, the Silver Arrows of Mercedes-Benz and Auto Union dominated Grand Prix motor racing that from 1934 to 1937 only was limited by a maximum weight of 750 kg, with large supercharged engines producing over 500 hp, and no other country being willing or able to keep up with the German cars. For 1938, engine size was limited to 3000cc supercharged, but new cars like the V12 Mercedes-Benz W154 still produced well over 450 hp and race wins.

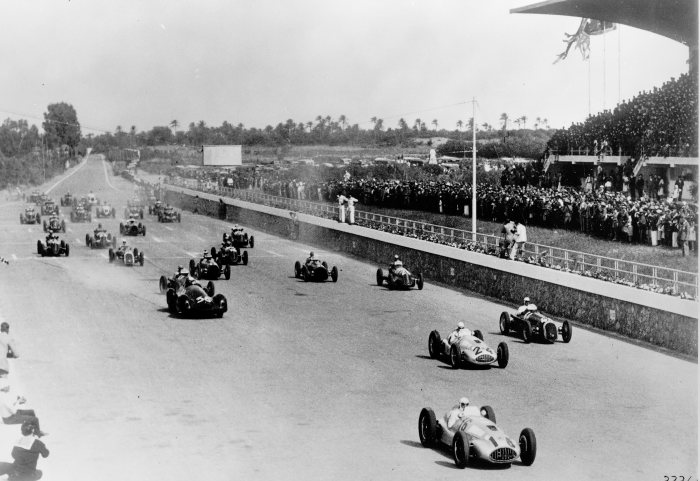
Two Mercedes-Benz W165 leading at the start of the 1939 Tripoli GP for Voiturette (F2) cars

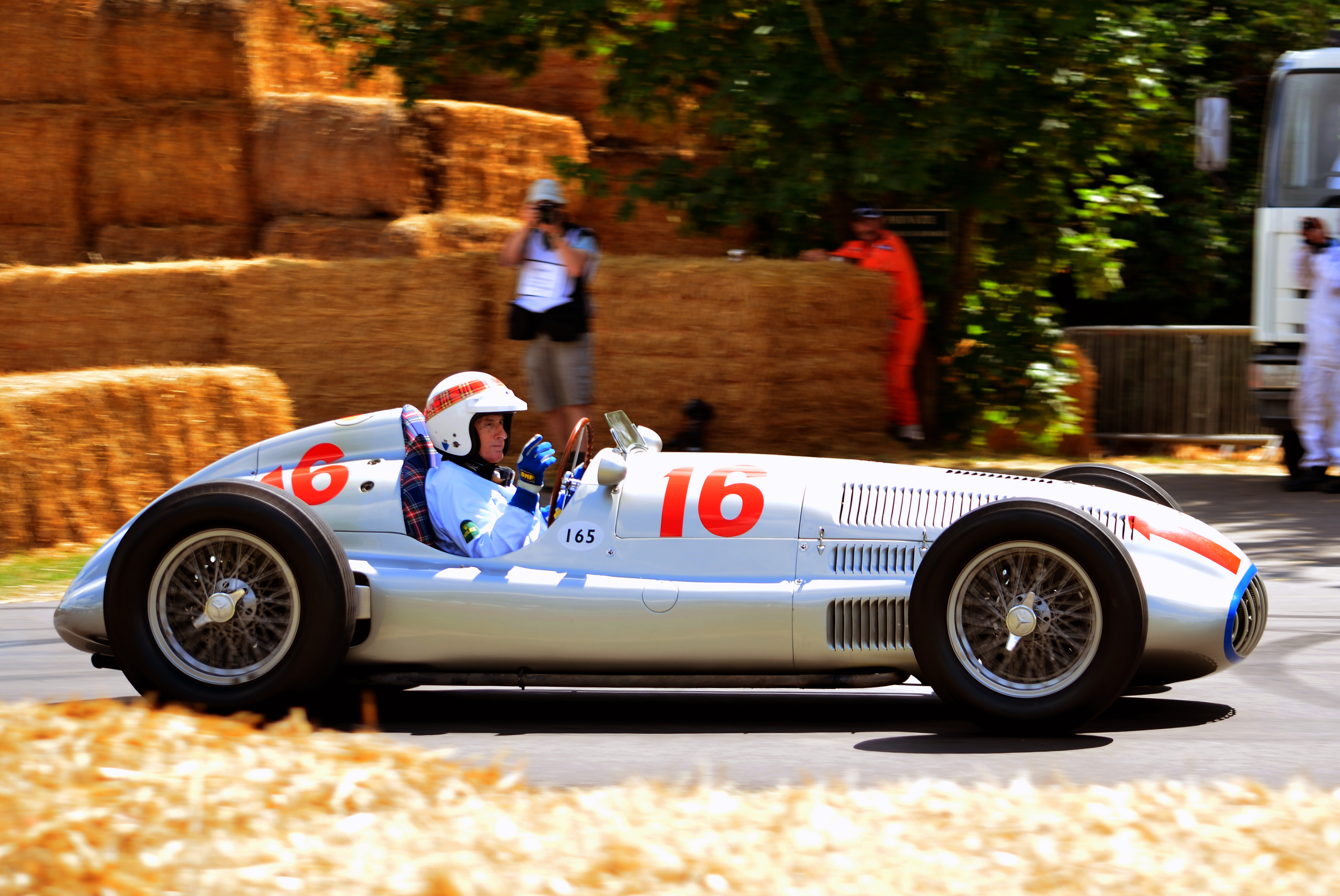
Jackie Stewart in a Mercedes-Benz W165 at the Goodwood Festival of Speed 2014

Most other countries focussed on the smaller Voiturette (F2)-class racing cars that allowed only 1500cc when supercharged. The popular Tripoli Grand Prix was contested in 1939 to Voiturette rules, but the Italian manufacturers Alfa Romeo, Maserati and others were denied a victory as Mercedes had learned about the move in late 1938. The engineers developed the small V8-powered Mercedes-Benz W165 over eight winter months, and won the event 1–2. Mercedes had invested in the construction not only for the single race it actually competed it, but in anticipation that the Grand Prix motor racing rules would be changed to Voiturette rules. The war prevented this, but it came in effect afterwards.

The 1946 Turin Grand Prix was the first race run to the 1947 Grand Prix Formula technical regulations, which allowed for either 1500cc supercharged engines or 4500cc naturally-aspirated engines. The regulations, while not in force, had been proposed by the Commission Sportive Internationale (CSI) as late as March 1946 and was approved by the Association Internationale des Automobile Clubs Reconnus (AIACR) on 24 June 1946, in the same meeting that officially changed their name to the Fédération Internationale de l'Automobile (FIA). These regulations would remain unchanged throughout the inaugural season of the Formula One World Championship in 1950.

The Mercedes-Benz W165 was qualified for Formula One and in 1950, Mercedes-Benz was in a position to at least contemplate taking part in motor racing again. In November 1950, the engineers started to consider a new F1 car with the code W 195, either a 1.5 liter V12 with supercharger, or a 4.5 liter without.

Not enough parts of the W165 remained, but there were several surviving 3000cc Mercedes-Benz W154 which only qualified for Formula Libre races, like the series run in South America. Mercedes entered the February 1951 Buenos Aires Grand Prix (I) and 1951 Buenos Aires Grand Prix (II). The three car team, led by veteran manager Alfred Neubauer, was beaten by a new Ferrari in each race. Juan Manuel Fangio drove one of the Mercedes and set pole positions and fastest lap.

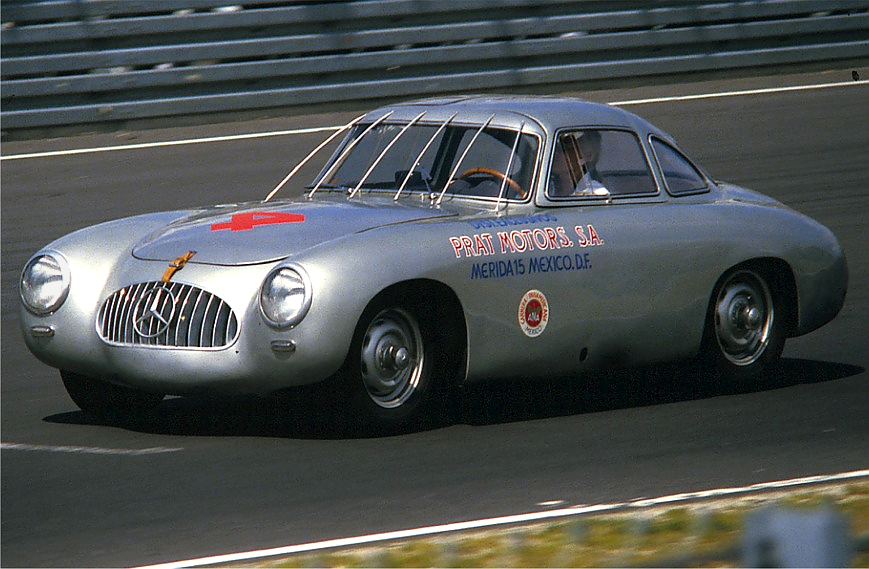
1952 Mercedes-Benz W194 300 SL sports car, winner of the Carrera Panamericana, demonstrated in 1986

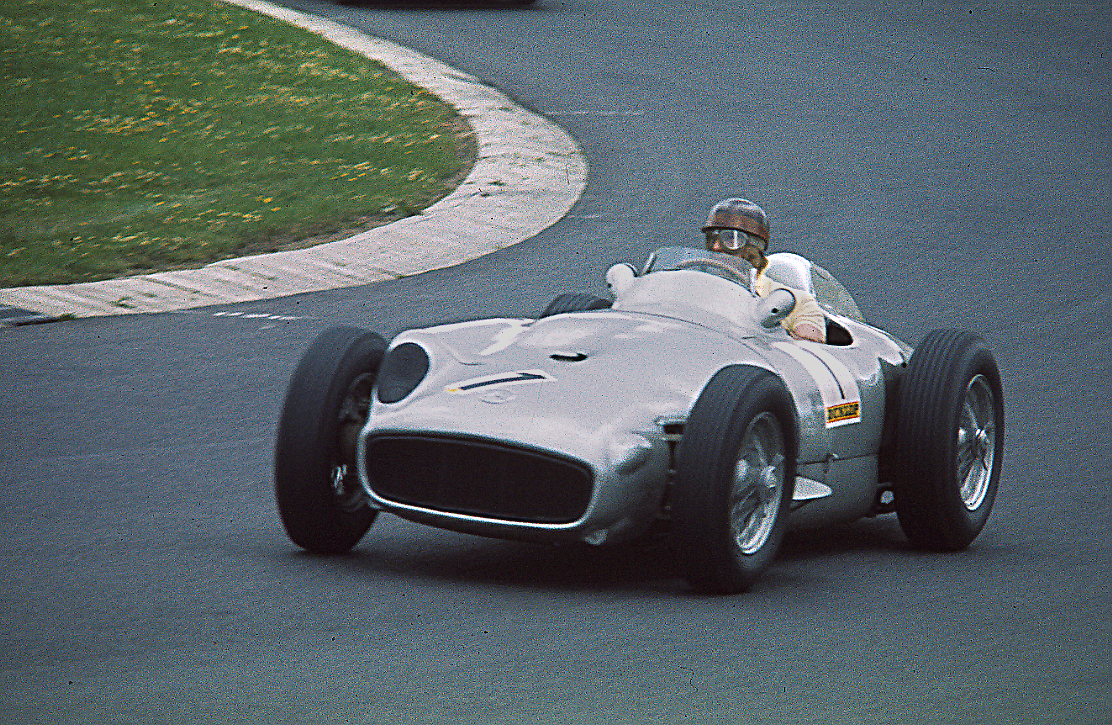
1955 Mercedes-Benz W196 with Fangio at the wheel, in 1977

On 15 June 1951, the Mercedes directors approved a budget for racing that included five Mercedes-Benz W165 and five engines. Neubauer noted in his diary "Race cars and sports cars will be built!" (referring also to the Mercedes-Benz W194 300 SL), but after visiting the 29 July 1951 German Grand Prix, stated "Building new W165 makes no sense as it only can achieve parity, not superiority. The budget must be used for a new construction, but due to uncertainty of the future of F1 rules, only design work for the V12 continues. The October session of the FIA will determine whether the car will be built."

Already on 22 September 1951 Fritz Nallinger, leader of the Daimler Benz Research and Development department, stopped all work on the W195 which could run no sooner than summer of 1952, and would be competitive only in 1953, which might be the last season of the 1500cc Formula, thus the effort would not be justified. In fact, Alfa Romeo, which also raced a pre-war design, the Alfa Romeo 158/159 Alfetta, pulled out of F1 racing, leaving only Ferrari as competitive constructor for 1952, thus the Championship was run to Formula 2 rules in 1952 and 1953. Only few non-championship races were run under F1 or Formula Libre rules with older, more powerful cars.

Concurrently to F1 considerations, the Mercedes-Benz W194 300 SL sportscar was developed, to be raced in 1952, which it did with great success. It would be sold from 1954 onwards as Mercedes-Benz W198 300 SL Gullwing.

Design work for the new 1954 rules, 2500cc or 750cc supercharged, was done as Mercedes-Benz W196. In the hands of Fangio and Stirling Moss it won 9 of 12 races entered, and captured all world championships in which it competed.

== See also ==
- Mercedes-Benz W194 (1952 300 SL)
- Mercedes-Benz W196 (1954&55 Formula 1)
- Mercedes-Benz in Formula One
