= Mercedes-Benz supercharged Grand Prix racing engine =

Mercedes-Benz Grand Prix racing engines

Overview
- Manufacturer: (Germany) Mercedes-Benz
- Production: 1934–1939

Layout
- Configuration: Straight-eight; 60° V12/ 90° V8
- Displacement: 3.4 L (3,364 cc); 3.7 L (3,718 cc); 4.0 L (3,992 cc); 4.3 L (4,309 cc); 4.7 L (4,740 cc); 5.7 L (5,663 cc); 3.0 L (2,961 cc); 1.5 L (1,493 cc)
- Cylinder bore: 78 mm (3.1 in); 82 mm (3.2 in); 86 mm (3.4 in); 94 mm (3.7 in); 67 mm (2.6 in); 64 mm (2.5 in)
- Piston stroke: 88 mm (3.5 in); 94.5 mm (3.7 in); 102 mm (4.0 in); 70 mm (2.8 in); 58 mm (2.3 in)
- Valvetrain: 32-valve to 48-valve, DOHC, four-valves per cylinder
- Compression ratio: 7.3:1–7.5:1

Combustion
- Supercharger: Roots-type supercharger
- Fuel system: Carburetor
- Oil system: Dry sump

Output
- Power output: 280–640 hp (209–477 kW)
- Torque output: 253.5–715 lb⋅ft (344–969 N⋅m)

Dimensions
- Dry weight: 222 kg (489 lb)

Chronology
- Successor: Mercedes-Benz M196 engine (I8); Mercedes-Benz M120 engine (12); Mercedes-Benz M297 engine (12)

Mercedes-Benz made a series of pre-war supercharged Grand Prix racing engines for their Silver Arrow race cars; between 1934 and 1939. They made two supercharged large capacity inline-8 engines only limited by the 750kg maximum weight rules: the M25 and M125.

For the limit of 3 liter supercharged that came in effect for 1938, one V12 was designed, with two generations; the M154 / M163.

Not to Grand Prix rules, but for Voiturette (F2) rules and closely related, was the one-off model made for the 1939 Tripoli Grand Prix, the 1500 cc supercharged V8 Mercedes-Benz W165 which also was run at the 1947 Indianapolis 500. The design could have been raced in post war Grand Prix and even in Formula One up to 1951, but Mercedes decided against reviving the old model.

Some of the surviving W154 were entered in 1951 Formula Libre races in Argentina. At the 1952 German Grand Prix, one of the Mercedes 300 SL (W194) entered in the supporting sports car race had a supercharged version of the Mercedes-Benz M194 engine, the M197, which basically was the very last Mercedes-Benz supercharged Grand Prix racing engine.

== 1934 ==
From 1928 to 1932, the Mercedes-Benz SSK had a supercharged M06 7,069 cc (7.1 L) SOHC I6 engine that powered a 3,750 lb (1,700 kg) car with up to 300 hp (220 kW). For 1934, the rules for Grand Prix racing cars were simple: a 750kg maximum weight, and not much else.

Despite reducing the engine size by roughly half, with about 3.3 litre in the first version, Daimler engineers soon managed to get more power from the supercharged Straight-8 M25 engine than the maximum 300 hp of the SSK. Staying under the weight limit was a challenge, though, and legend has it that the traditional white paint had to be removed over night after the cars failed scrutineering, giving birth to the Silver Arrows. That moniker was already used in 1932, though.

The Mercedes W25A arrived later than the Auto Union racing cars to the 1934 Grand Prix season, but won some races.

== 1935 ==
Development of the chassis and the car, with versions W25AB and W25B, allowed to increase capacity close to 4-litres, and output of 370 hp (280 kW). The W25B dominated the 1935 Grand Prix season.

== 1936 ==
The 1936 Grand Prix season was dominated by political turmoil, and by the Auto Union C, which had its V16 bored out to 6.0 litre and over 500hp, while Mercedes reached the limit of the M25 engines which became unreliable when enlarged to 4.7-litre and 490 hp. A DAB V12 engine was tested, but it proved too heavy for the weight limit, thus the chassis was shortened. The shorter W25K was not good for GP racing, thus the V12 engine was used in the high speed Mercedes-Benz W125 Rekordwagen only. Mercedes used the shorter W25K chassis as well as the M25C with over 400 hp (300 kW), but that was not enough. Mercedes withdrew from the 1936 season already after the August 1936 Swiss Grand Prix to focus on a new car.

== 1937 ==
For the 1937 Grand Prix season, a new chassis and a new engine was made: the W125 and M125.

With still no regulations limiting engine size, other than the 750 kg (1,650 lb) total car weight limit, Mercedes designed a 5.6-litre engine configured with eight inline cylinders and double overhead camshaft for the W125. Named the M125, the engine was also fitted with a Roots type supercharger. It was producing 632 lb⋅ft (857 N⋅m) of torque at the start of the season. The engine builts varied in power, attaining an output range of 560–640 hp (420–480 kW) at 5800 rpm. Fuel used was a custom mix of 40% methyl alcohol, 32% benzene, 24% ethyl alcohol and 4% gasoline light. The engine weighed 222 kg (489 lb) - approximately 30% of the total weight of the car, and was mounted in the front of the car.

The W125's supercharged engine, with 8 cylinders in line, bore x stroke of 94.0 mm × 102 mm (3.7 in × 4.0 in), displacing 5,662.85 cc (345.57 cu in), attained an output of up to 595 horsepower (444 kW) in race trim. The highest testbed power measured was 637 bhp (646 PS) at 5,800 rpm. It gave 245 bhp (248 PS) at a mere 2,000 rpm.

The W125 was considered the most powerful road racing car ever for about three decades, until large capacity, American-built V8 engines in Can-Am sports cars reached similar power in the late 1960s. In Grand Prix racing itself, the figure was not exceeded until the early 1980s (when Grand Prix racing had become known as Formula One), with the appearance of very powerful turbocharged 1500cc engines; such as the Renault EF-Type engine, BMW M12/13, and the Ferrari Tipo 021.

== 1938 ==
The 1938 Grand Prix season saw changes in the rules by the sports governing body AIACR, with the maximum limit on weight being replaced with a maximum limit on engine capacity (3000 cc when supercharged, 4500 cc without) and a minimum weight for the car being introduced. Thus, the W125 was no longer eligible for entry, and even the 1934 W25A engine was too large for the new rules. Instead, Mercedes-Benz developed a new car, the Mercedes-Benz W154 car based on the chassis design of the W125, with a V12 M154 engine, supercharged 3000 cc, after both types had been tested.

The new M154 engine was a 3.0 L (2,961.54 cc; 180.7 cu in) supercharged V12 with bore x stroke of 67.0 mm × 70.0 mm (2.64 in × 2.76 in), attaining an output between 425 and 474 hp (317 and 353 kW). In 1939, the 2-stage supercharged version recorded a testbed power of 476 bhp (483 PS) at 7,800 rpm. Each one of these engines reputedly cost 89,700 German reichsmarks in 1938 (US$949,601 today).

The new car was successful, with the competition also having to comply with the new rules.

== 1939 ==
For the 1939 Grand Prix season that was not completed, a different body was used, and the M154 engine was replaced by the M163 version. As a result of the new engine number, the 1939 car is often mistakenly referred to as a Mercedes-Benz W163.

In addition, for Voiturette (F2) rules applied to the 1939 Tripoli Grand Prix, the 1500 cc supercharged V8 Mercedes-Benz W165 was built.

== Applications ==
- Mercedes-Benz W25
- Mercedes-Benz W125
- Mercedes-Benz W125 Rekordwagen
- Mercedes-Benz W154
