= 1939 Tripoli Grand Prix =

Race details
- Date: 7 May 1939
- Official name: XIII° GRAN PREMIO DI TRIPOLI
- Location: Mellaha, Italy
- Course: Permanent racing facility
- Course length: 13.140 km (8.164 miles)
- Distance: 40 laps, 525.60 km (326.592 miles)

Pole position
Driver	(Italy) Luigi Villoresi	Maserati
- Time: 3:41.8

Fastest lap
Driver	(Germany) Hermann Lang	Mercedes Benz
- Time: 3:43.77

Podium
First	(Germany) Hermann Lang	Mercedes Benz
Second	(Germany) Rudolf Caracciola	Mercedes Benz
Third	(Italy) Emilio Villoresi	Alfa Romeo

The 1939 Tripoli Grand Prix was a voiturette motor race, notable - and notorious - as the only pre-war racing appearance of the Mercedes-Benz W165.

== Background ==
Maserati 4CL streamliner

Previous Tripoli Grands Prix had been run to the Grand Prix formula, which in 1938 had changed to one of engine capacity rather than maximum weight - cars limited to 3 litre supercharged, or 4.5 litre unsupercharged engines. The formula had once again been dominated by Mercedes-Benz and Auto Union, the former with the W154 model and the latter with the Type D.

As a result, the Automobile Club d'Italia - late in 1938 - decided to run the 1939 Tripoli race to voiturette regulations, which stipulated engines of 1.5 litre size. The announcement was kept late deliberately, as, although there were Italian cars which met the formula, there were no German cars of note which did, and the A.C.I. did not want the German companies to build a car at short notice.

== Entry ==
Contrary to expectations, Mercedes-Benz was able to produce a car, the W165, having tested it at the new Hockenheim circuit, and produced three cars in time for the Tripoli race; two of which it gave to its leading drivers Hermann Lang and Rudolf Caracciola, with Richard Seaman as reserve.

Maserati produced a new car, the 4CL, of which it entered three; that of Luigi Villoresi was fitted with streamlined bodywork to take advantage of the speedy nature of the Mellaha circuit. One other 4CL had been given to Giovanni Rocco.

Alfa Romeo had the 158 which it had first used in 1938. Italian jingoism had reached a stage by which only Italian drivers were permitted to drive for the factory, so Raymond Sommer was jettisoned in favour of Giordano "Nando" Aldrighetti. The remaining entrants were mostly Italian privateers and amateurs, in Maseratis "of all shapes and sorts", who had entered in the expectation of the race being more or less a domestic event.

== Race ==
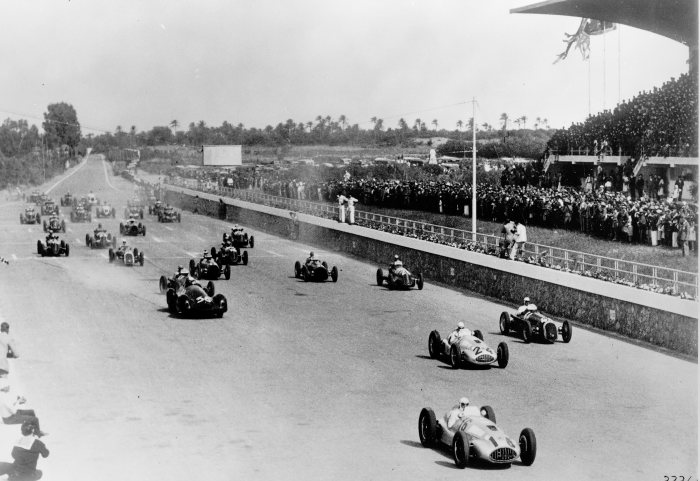
The start of the race, with the W165s already in a lead which they never relinquished

Luigi Villoresi duly set pole position, in the streamliner, his top speed estimated to be 170mph. However the race was disastrous for the Italian cars. As the flag dropped, Luigi Villoresi could not find a gear, and was almost instantly out; two of the other new Maseratis retired almost as quickly with piston troubles. Nino Farina poked his 158 into second place from laps five to ten, but the effort caused his Alfa to overheat, and the Silver Arrows ran 1–2 to the finish.

Indeed, all the Alfas suffered from heating problems, exacerbated by the heat of the day; designer Gioacchino Colombo put the overheating down to last-minute changes made by team manager Meo Costantini, but in fact the engine needed a re-design afterwards. By the end Lang was nearly two full laps ahead of the best Italian car (that of Emilio Villoresi, Luigi's brother). His fastest lap was clocked at 130mph and his overall average speed was nearly 122mph.

== Result ==
Pos	No	Driver	Constructor	Laps	Time/Retired	Grid
1	16	(Germany) Hermann Lang	Mercedes-Benz W165	30	1'59:12.36	2
2	24	(Germany) Rudolf Caracciola	Mercedes-Benz W165	30	+3:37.28	3
3	48	(Italy) Emilio Villoresi	Alfa Romeo 158	30	+7:47.64	5
4	30	(Italy) Piero Taruffi	Maserati 6CM	30	+14:18.78	30
5	60	(Switzerland) Armand Hug	Maserati 6CM	30	+17:53.27	16
6	46	(Italy) Andrea Brezzi	Maserati 6CM	30	+21:03.31	21
7	8	(Germany) Heinz Dipper	Maserati 6CM	30	+36:01.72	25
8	58	(Italy) Dioscoride Lanza	Maserati 6CM	28	+2 laps	15
9	6	(Italy) Edoardo Teagno	Maserati 6CM	28	+2 Laps	23
10	2	(Italy) Luigi Castelbarco	Maserati 6CM	27	+3 Laps	18
11	32	(Italy) Renato Balestrero	Maserati 6CM	27	+3 laps	22
12	14	(Italy) Enrico Platé	Maserati 6CM	26	+4 Laps	27
Ret	10	(Italy) Giovanni Rocco	Maserati 4CL	29	out of fuel?	8
Ret	22	(Italy) Ovidio Capelli	Maserati 6CM	18		17
Ret	36	(Germany) Paul Pietsch	Maserati 6CM	18	Fuel feed	14
Ret	26	(Italy) Ettore Bianco	Maserati 6CM	16	-	12
Ret	12	(Italy) Catullo Lami	Maserati 4CM	15	-	19
Ret	50	(Italy) Carlo Pintacuda	Alfa Romeo 158	15	engine	10
Ret	56	(Italy) Emilio Romano	Maserati 6CM	15	-	26
Ret	40	(Italy) Clemente Biondetti	Alfa Romeo 158	15	engine	5
Ret	42	(Italy) Francesco Severi	Alfa Romeo 158	14	engine	13
Ret	34	(Italy) Nando Aldrighetti	Alfa Romeo 158	11	engine	7
Ret	44	(Italy) Giuseppe Farina	Alfa Romeo 158	10	engine	4
Ret	4	(Italy) Guido Barbieri	Maserati 6CM	8		28
Ret	38	(Italy) Luigi Villoresi	Maserati 4CL	1	engine/gearbox	1
Ret	20	(Italy) Franco Cortese	Maserati 4CL	1	piston	11
Ret	18	(Italy) Carlo Felice Trossi	Maserati 4CL	0	piston	10
Ret	28	(Italy) Arialdi Ruggeri	Maserati 6CM	0	engine	20
Ret	52	(Italy) Pino Baruffi	Maserati 6CM	0		29
Ret	54	(Italy) Pietro Ghersi	Maserati 6CM	0		26
