= Circuito Costanera (Buenos Aires) =

Circuito Costanera Norte
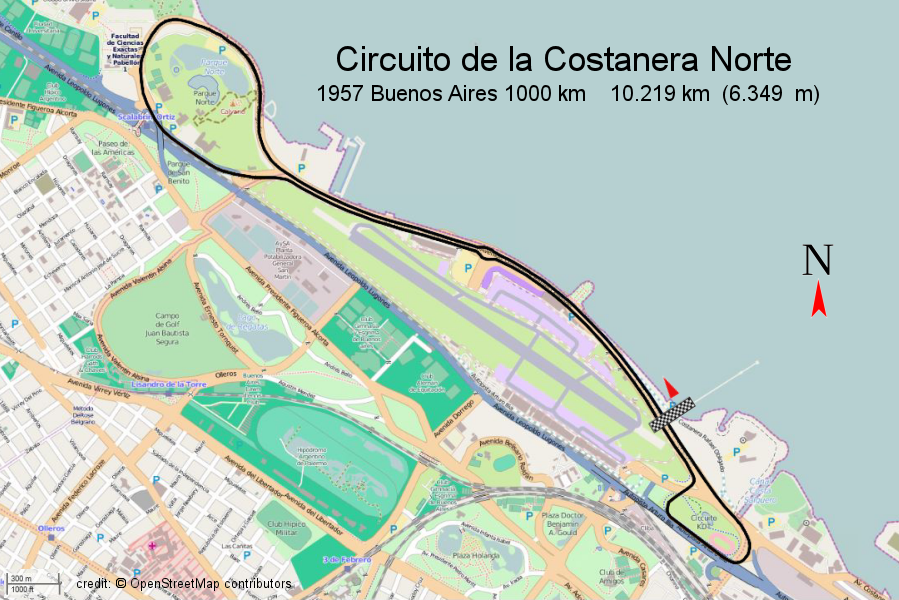
- Buenos Aires 1000km Circuit (1957)

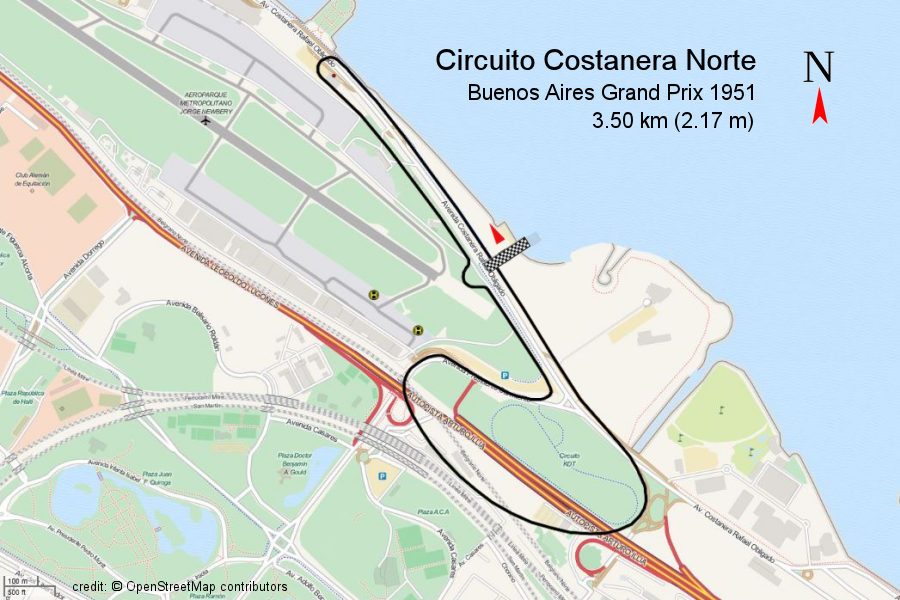
- Costanera Norte Circuit (1951)
- Location: Aeroparque Newbery, Palermo, Buenos Aires
- Coordinates: 34°33′30″S 58°24′37″W
- Opened: 1932
- Closed: January 1957; 69 years ago
- Major events: 1000 km Buenos Aires (1957); Buenos Aires Grand Prix (1936, 1951)

Buenos Aires 1000km Circuit (1957)
- Length: 10.200 km (6.338 mi)
- Turns: 13
- Race lap record: 3:36.000 ( (United Kingdom) Stirling Moss, Maserati 300S, 1957, Sports car racing)

Costanera Norte Circuit (1951)
- Length: 3.500 km (2.175 mi)
- Turns: 7
- Race lap record: 1:58.600 ( (Argentina) José Froilán González, Ferrari 166 FL, 1951, Formula Libre)

Costanera Sur Circuit (1932–1936)
- Length: 2.650 km (1.647 mi)
- Race lap record: 1:20.100 ( (Argentina) Carlos Zatuszek, Mercedes-Benz SSK, 1936, Formula Libre)

The Circuito Costanera (English: Costanera Circuit), was a Grand Prix circuit in Buenos Aires (Argentina). Two variants are known to have existed under Circuito "Avenida" Costanera and Costanera "Sur" which are listed by a few data sources as circuits used for the 1930, 1932 and 1936 Buenos Aires races. Verifiable records can only confirm the Costanera Norte circuit layouts for the 1951 V Gran Premio General Perón (Feb. 18), V Gran Premio Eva Perón (Feb. 25), Gran Premio Eva Perón (Ciudad) Sport (March 18) and the 1957 1000 km de Buenos Aires.

The 1951 circuit used a 3.500 km (2.175 mi) long layout of the wide service roads at the Jorge Newbery Airport (built in 1947 as the "Aeroparque 17 de Octubre") and the connecting access loop at the south end of the air field. For the 1957 1000 km of Buenos Aires, the last race at Costanera Buenos Aires, the circuit layout was extended to a 10.219 km (6.350 mi) long configuration, utilizing the Parque Norte loop north of the airport complex.

== Buenos Aires Grand Prix 1948 - 1950 ==
Formula Libre (Temporada) - Formula One (non-championship)
Year	Name	Circuit	Date	Winning drivers	Winning constructor	Regulations	Report
1930	(Argentina) Gran Premio de Buenos Aires	Avenida Costanera	January 12	(Argentina) Juan Malcolm	Delage 2.0	Formula Libre	Report
1932	(Argentina) Premio Ciudad de Buenos Aires	Avenida Costanera	October 5	(Argentina) Domingo Bucci	Hudson	Formula Libre	Report
1936	(Argentina) Gran Premio Ciudad de Buenos Aires	Costanera Sur	October 18	(Argentina) Carlos Arzani	Alfa Romeo 2900 GP	Fuerza Libre	Report
1951	(Argentina) V Gran Premio Gral Perón (Ciudad)	Costanera Norte	February 18	(Argentina) José Froilán González	Ferrari 166 FL	Formula Libre	Report
1951	(Argentina) V Gran Premio Eva Perón (Ciudad)	Costanera Norte	February 25	(Argentina) José Froilán González	Ferrari 166 FL	Formula Libre	Report
1951	(Argentina) V Gran Premio Eva Perón (Ciudad)(Sport)	Costanera Norte	March 18	(United States) John Fitch	Allard J2-Cadillac	Formula Libre	Report

== 1000 km Buenos Aires ==
Year	Name	Circuit	Date	Winning drivers	Winning constructor	Regulations	Report
1957	(Argentina) 1000 km de Buenos Aires	Avenida Costanera	January 20	(United States) Masten Gregory (Italy) Eugenio Castellotti (Italy) Luigi Musso	Ferrari 290 MM	Sports car	Report

== Lap Records ==
The fastest official race lap records at the Circuito Costanera (Buenos Aires) are listed as:

Category	Time	Driver	Vehicle	Event
Buenos Aires 1000km Circuit (1957): 10.219 km (6.350 mi)
Sports car racing	3:36.000	Stirling Moss	Maserati 300S	1957 1000 km Buenos Aires
Costanera Norte Circuit (1951): 3.500 km (2.175 mi)
Formula Libre	1:58.600	José Froilán González	Ferrari 166 FL	1951 2nd Buenos Aires Grand Prix
Costanera Sur Circuit (1932–1936): 2.650 km (1.647 mi)
Formula Libre	1:20.100	Carlos Zatuszek	Mercedes-Benz SSK	1936 Buenos Aires Grand Prix
