= Mercedes-Benz W154 =

Racing car designed by Rudolf Uhlenhaut

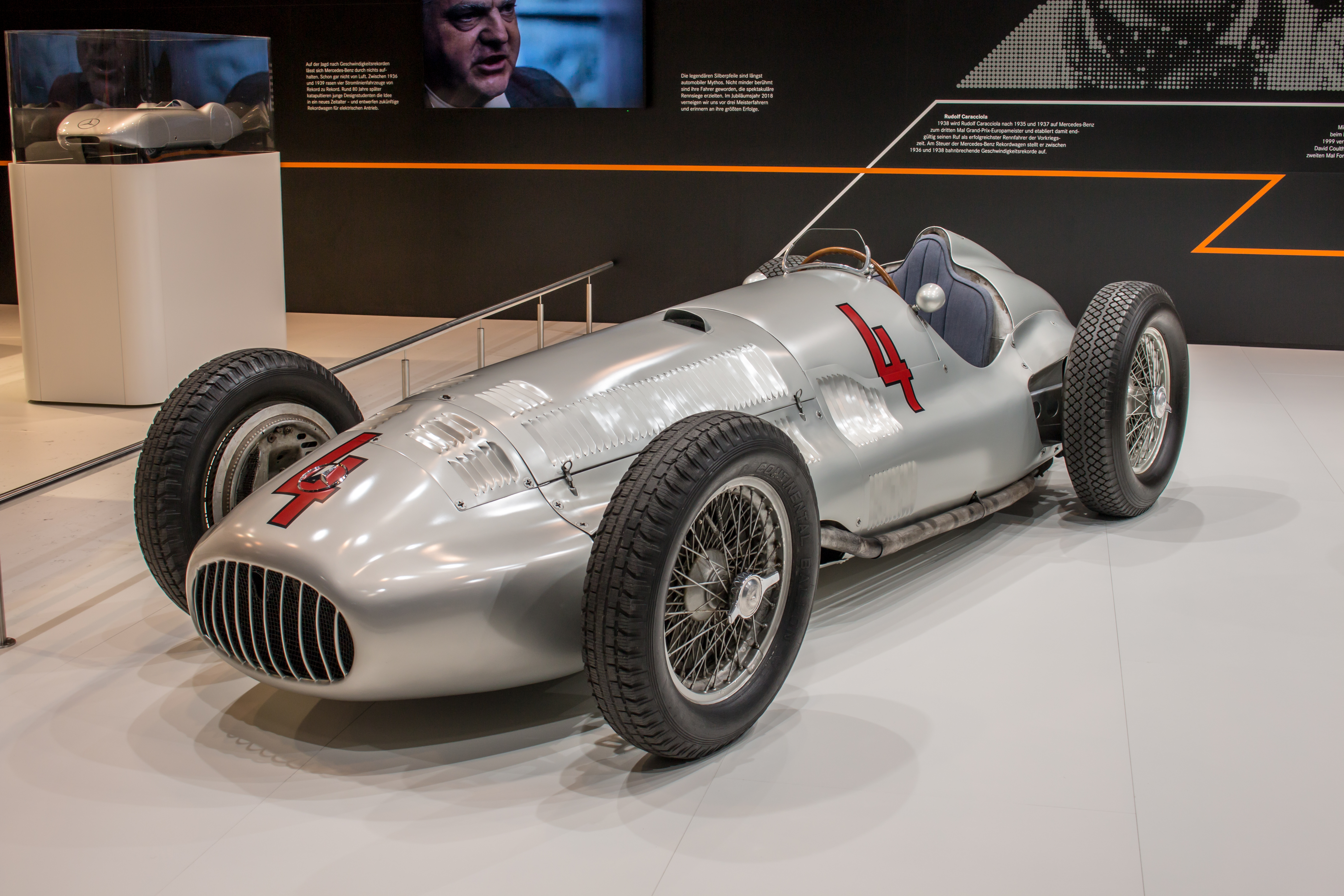
- Category: Grand Prix
- Constructor: Mercedes-Benz
- Designers: Max Sailer; Albert Heess; Max Wagner; Rudolf Uhlenhaut
- Predecessor: Mercedes-Benz W125

Technical specifications
- Chassis: Oval tubular frame
- Suspension (front): Independent suspension with wishbones, coil springs, hydraulic dampers
- Suspension (rear): De Dion axle, torsion bars, cockpit adjustable hydraulic dampers
- Engine: M154 & M163 3.0 litre V12 (60°) supercharged front-engine, longitudinally mounted
- Transmission: Mercedes-Benz 5-speed manual transmission ZF differential
- Weight: 980 kg (2,161 lb) (1938); 910 kg (2,006 lb) (1939)
- Tyres: Continental

Competition history
- Notable entrants: Daimler-Benz AG
- Notable drivers: Manfred von Brauchitsch; Rudolf Caracciola; Juan Manuel Fangio; Karl Kling; Hermann Lang; Richard Seaman
- Debut: 1938 Pau Grand Prix (non-championship); 1938 French Grand Prix (European Championship)
Races	Wins
23; 8 EC; 8 other GP; 4 Indy; 2 libre 1 hill climb	12; 6 EC; 5 other GP; 1 hill climb
- Drivers' Championships: 1

The Mercedes-Benz W154 was a Grand Prix racing car designed by Rudolf Uhlenhaut. The W154 competed in the 1938 and 1939 Grand Prix seasons and was used by Rudolf Caracciola to win the 1938 European Championship.

The W154 was created as a result of a rule change by the sports governing body AIACR, which limited supercharged engine capacities to 3000cc. Mercedes' previous car, the supercharged 5700cc W125, was therefore ineligible. The company decided that a new car based on the chassis of the W125 and designed to comply with the new regulations would be preferable to modifying the existing car.

Although using the same chassis design as the 1938 car, a different body was used for the 1939 season and the M154 engine used during 1938 was replaced by the M163. As a result of the new engine, the 1939 car is often mistakenly referred to as a Mercedes-Benz W163.

== Concept ==
For the 1938 season, Grand Prix racing's governing body AIACR moved from a formula limited by weight to one by engine capacity. The new regulations allowed a maximum capacity of 3000cc with a supercharger or 4500cc without. This meant Mercedes-Benz's previous car, the supercharged 5700cc W125, was ineligible to continue. Its new car was based on the W125 chassis, with a supercharged 3000cc engine determined after both types had been tested.

== Chassis and suspension ==
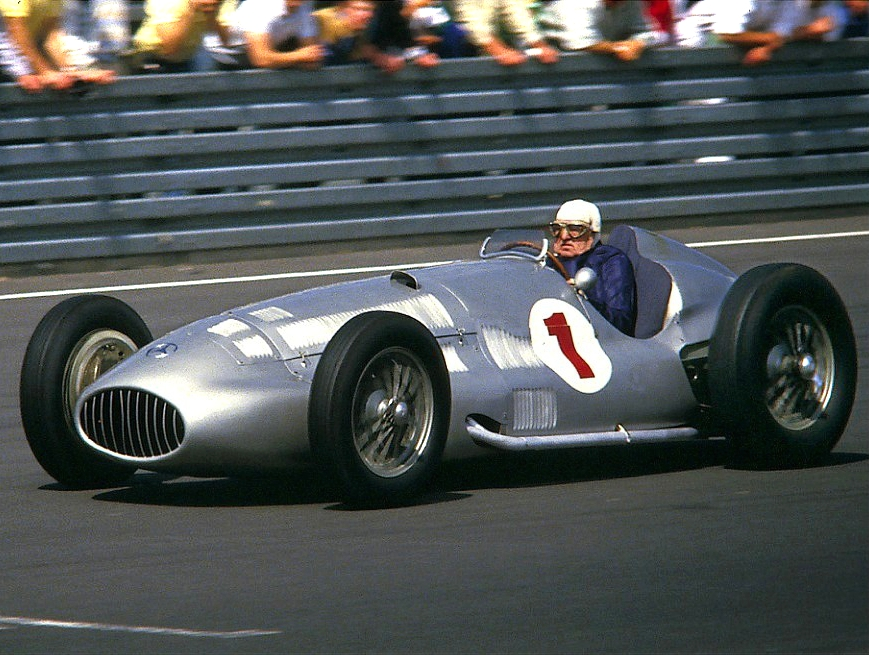
A 1939-spec. W154 being demonstrated in 1986 by Hermann Lang

The chassis was largely based on that of the preceding W125. The frame was constructed using oval tubes made of nickel-chrome molybdenum to provide stiffness.

The suspension was also near identical to the W125. The rear consisted of a De Dion tube, designed to keep the rear wheels parallel using a solid tubular beam. It also had hydraulic rear dampers, adjustable from within the cockpit during a race.

The bodywork of the W154 was aluminium, left unpainted like its predecessors, making it another of Mercedes' famed Silver Arrows.

== Technical data ==
Technical data	W154/39
Engine:	Front mounted 12 cylinder V engine
displacement:	2962 cm^{3}
Bore x stroke:	67 x 70mm
Compression:	7.5:1
Max power at rpm:	476 hp (483 PS) at 7 800 rpm
Max torque at rpm:	490 N⋅m (361 lb⋅ft) at 5 000 rpm
Valve control:	2 overhead camshafts per cylinder row, 4 valves per cylinder
Upload:	2 Roots compressor
Gearbox:	5-speed manual
suspension front:	Double wishbones, coil springs, hydraulic shock absorbers
suspension rear:	De Dion axle, longitudinal torsion bar, hydraulic shock absorbers
Brakes:	Hydraulic drum brakes
Chassis & body:	Cross-shaped oval tube frame with aluminum body
Wheelbase:	272 cm
Dry weight:	About 900 kg
Top speed:	310 km/h

== Engine and transmission ==
W154 start up
A W154 being started up and driven away at the Goodwood Festival of Speed in 2009

The new M154 engine was a 2,961 cc (180.7 cu in) capacity 67 mm × 70 mm (2.64 in × 2.76 in) supercharged V12, attaining an output between 425 and 474 horse power. In 1939, the 2-stage supercharged version recorded a test bed power of 476 BHP (483 PS) at 7,800 rpm. Each one of these engines reputedly cost 89,700 German reichsmarks in 1938 (USD $1 million today).

To compensate for the smaller engine compared to the W125, the W154 had an extra gear with a 5-speed manual transmission. The first gear was protected by a latch to avoid being engaged accidentally. To achieve an extremely low car, the engine is slightly off-set and the transmission tunnel passes next to the seat and not under the seat.In order to reduce the weight, it did not have a starter motor and an external starter was used to start it.

== Racing history ==
=== 1938 ===
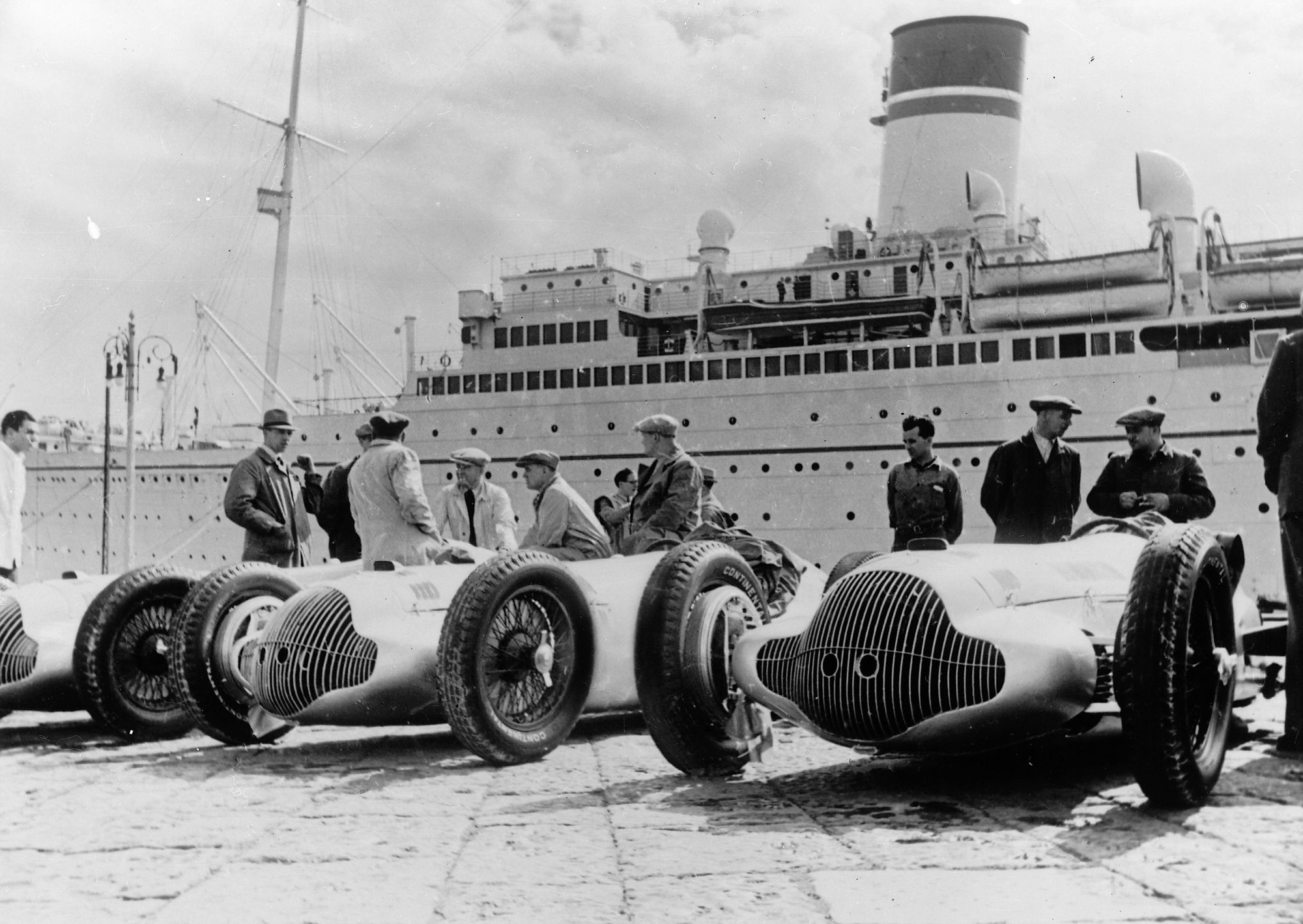
Three 1938 W154 arrive in Tripoli

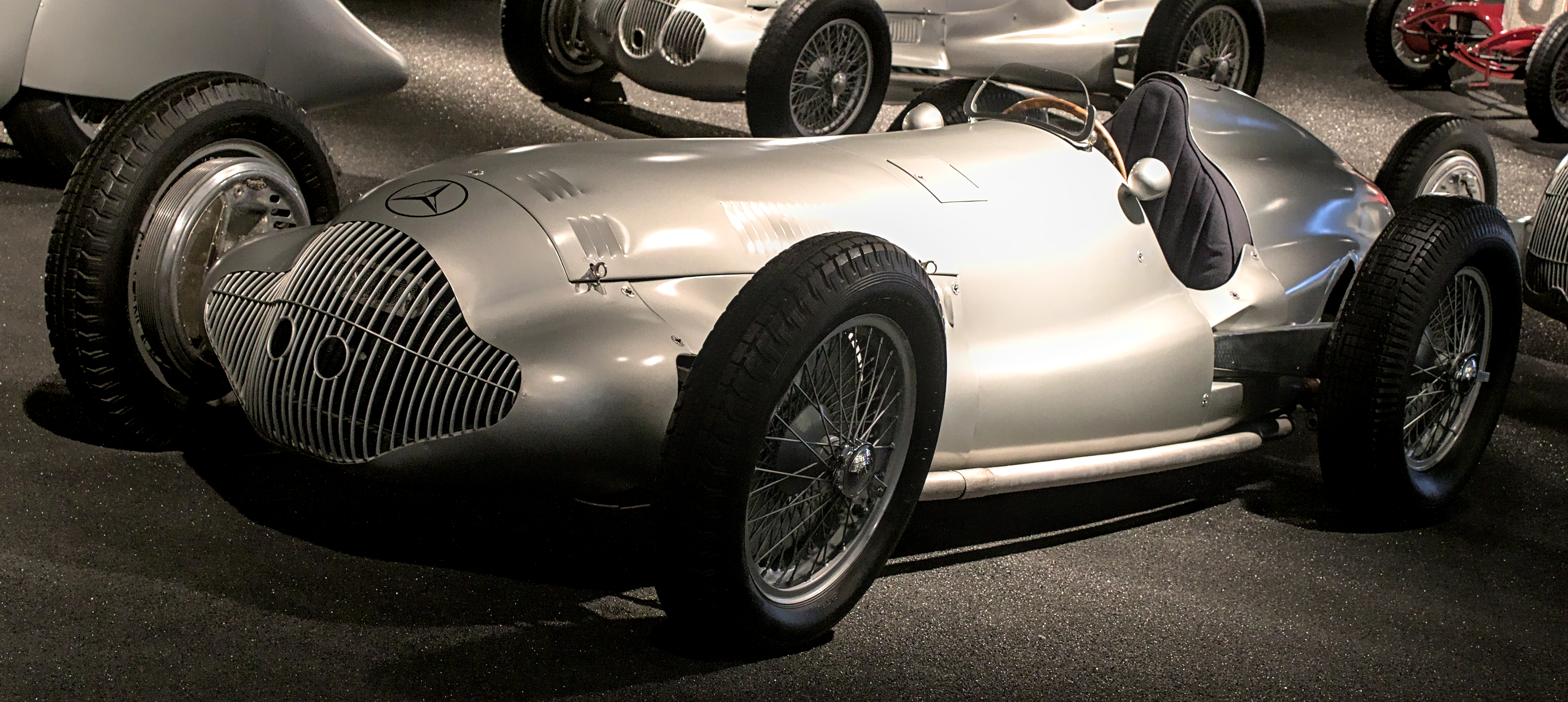
A W154 in 1938 configuration in the Mercedes-Benz Museum

The W154 made its debut in the opening race of the 1938 Grand Prix season, in which it would win 3 of 4 championship races, in the non-championship Pau Grand Prix in early April. Cars were entered for both Caracciola and Lang. Lang crashed during practice and the team withdrew his car. René Dreyfus took pole position in a Delahaye, but Caracciola was second and managed to beat Dreyfus away from the line at the start of the race. Despite leading, Caracciola was suffering from an old leg injury, and when he pitted for fuel he handed the car over to Lang. Dreyfus took the lead and would not need to pit as his car's lower fuel consumption meant he could complete the race non-stop. Lang's car developed a spark plug problem and finished the race in second place, nearly two minutes behind.

The car's next outing was at the Italian North Africa Tripoli Grand Prix, again a non-championship race, was much more successful. Raymond Sommer was allowed to enter as Independent with a fourth factory Alfa Romeo 158 quickly repainted in French racing blue. Mercedes wanted to do the same but a fourth W154 for Richard Seaman, that would be entered in full British Racing Green instead of just some green markings, was denied. The three Silver cars that were entered for Lang, von Brauchitsch and Caracciola qualified first, second and third respectively. The gap from Caracciola to fourth placed Clemente Biondetti was over three seconds. The cars retained these positions at the end of the race and although von Brauchitsch and Caracciola had both suffered engine problems, Caracciola still finished over eight minutes ahead of fourth placed Raymond Sommer.

The first race of the European Championship was the French Grand Prix, held at the Reims-Gueux circuit. Three cars were entered, for Caracciola, von Brauchitsch and Lang. A poor turnout meant that there were only nine competitors. Team manager Alfred Neubauer offered to enter a fourth W154 for Richard Seaman, but the organisers insisted on a maximum of three cars per team. Lang took pole position, with von Brauchitsch second and Caracciola third, ahead of the two Auto Unions of Christian Kautz and Rudolf Hasse. The Mercedes-Benz cars led from the start. After two laps, four cars had retired, leaving only the Mercedes-Benz and Talbot cars in the race, the Talbots already a minute behind. Lang had difficulties in a pit-stop and Caracciola's engine started firing on only eleven of its twelve cylinders. This left von Brauchitsch to claim victory ahead of Caracciola and Lang. The only other finisher was René Carrièrè in a Talbot, ten laps behind.

Three weeks after the French Grand Prix came the second race of the European Championship, the German Grand Prix. Four W154s were entered and they took the first four positions on the starting grid; von Brauchitsch took pole position from Lang, Seaman and Caracciola. At the start, Lang took the lead but on lap three his car's spark plugs oiled up and he had to make an emergency pit stop. Shortly afterwards, team manager Alfred Neubauer brought Lang into the pits so that Walter Bäumer, a reserve driver for Mercedes-Benz, could take over. Lang's mechanical problems allowed von Brauchitsch to take the lead. Meanwhile, Caracciola had been struggling with abdominal pain and stopped on lap ten to allow Lang to take over his car. Von Brauchitsch came in for his second pit stop on lap sixteen, followed by Seaman in second position. During von Brauchitsch's pit stop, a mechanic spilt fuel over the car which was then ignited by a spark from the car's exhaust pipe. This allowed Seaman to exit the pits in the lead of the race. When his car's fire had been extinguished, von Brauchitsch also left the pits, only to crash his car later during the lap. Seaman continued on to win the race, followed by Lang in Caracciola's car. Lang's car, being driven by Bäumer, retired from the race with engine problems.

Following the French Grand Prix, Mercedes-Benz travelled to Italy to contest two non-championship races on each side of the Italian coast - the Coppa Ciano at Montenero (Livorno) and the Coppa Acerbo at Pescara. For the Coppa Ciano, Caracciola was entered in an experimental car with a larger saddle tank and a shorter tail section. Pole position went to Carlo Felice Trossi in a Maserati 8CTF, but he retired on lap eight with engine troubles. Caracciola retired due to a punctured fuel tank, leaving von Brauchitsch to win from Lang. After the race, von Brauchitsch was disqualified for receiving outside assistance, which left Lang as the winner. At the Coppa Acerbo, Mercedes-Benz failed to win the pole position for the second race in a row; Tazio Nuvolari took pole position in an Auto Union Type D. In the race, Nuvolari retired when his differential broke, leaving Caracciola to win. The two other W154s of von Brauchitsch and Lang retired with engine problems. Lang's car caught fire after a conrod severed the fuel pipe to his car's engine; the fire burnt away all of the aluminium bodywork.

=== 1939 ===
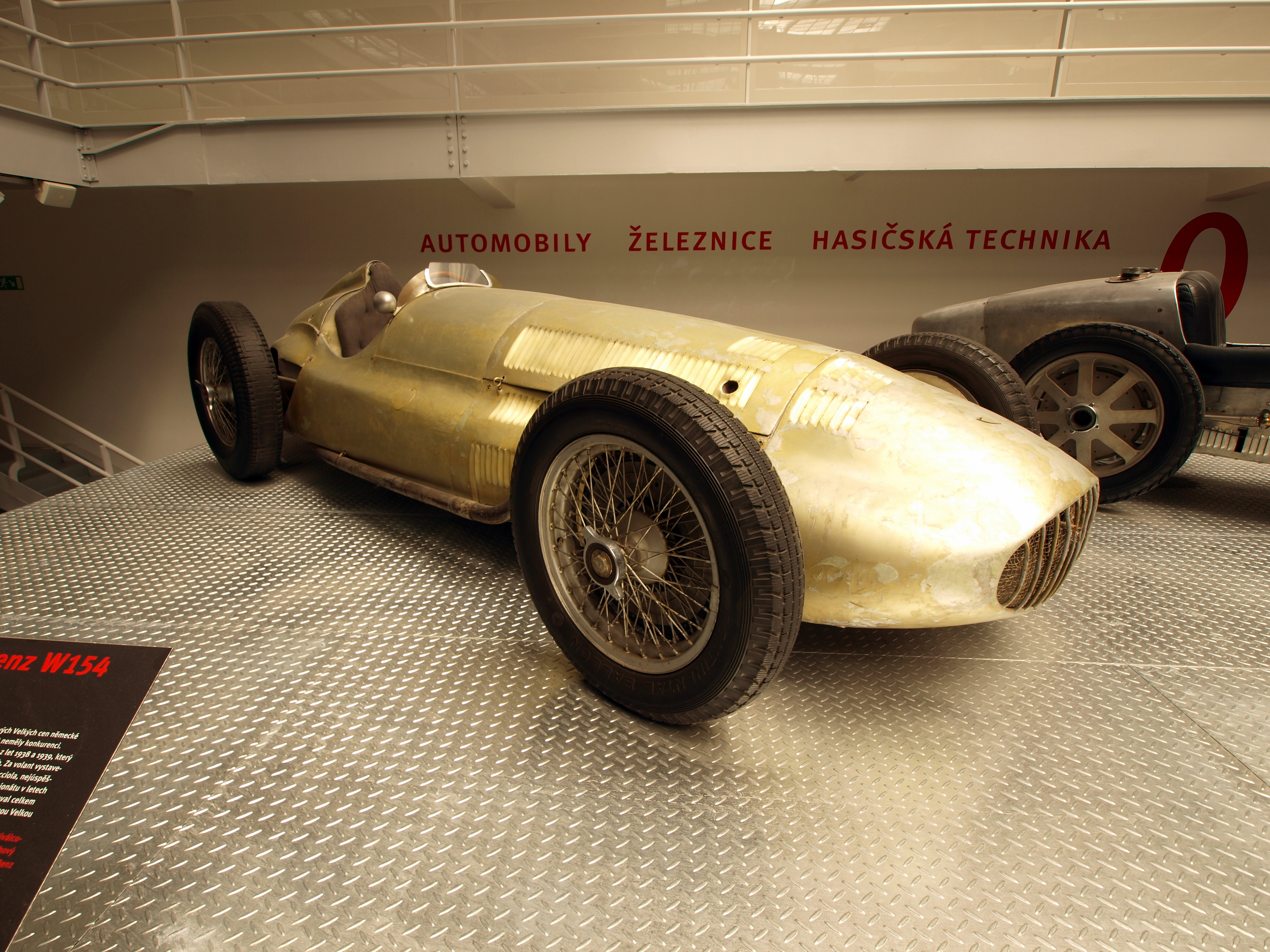
This 1939-spec W154 is among the most valuable exhibits of the National Technical Museum in Prague

The W154 was modified with a new lower front for the 1939 Grand Prix season, in which it again would win 3 of 4 championship races.

=== 1951 Formula Libre in Argentina ===
Three of the W154 that remained after the war were shipped overseas for two Formula Libre races in the 1951 "Temporada Argentina" series, the February 1951 Buenos Aires Grand Prix (I) and 1951 Buenos Aires Grand Prix (II). Drivers were Herrmann Lang, newcomer Karl Kling and home favorite Juan Manuel Fangio. Only the modern supercharged Ferrari 166 FL of José Froilán González could beat the outdated Mercedes, but second-place finishes is not was Mercedes was aiming for. Mercedes discontinued the W154 programme did not run the 1939 Tripoli winning voiturette Mercedes-Benz W165 in post-war Grand Prix, cancelled the Mercedes-Benz W195 project in 1951 and built the Mercedes-Benz W196 for 1954. In addition, the Mercedes-Benz W194 300 SL was entered in sportscar racing in 1952, winning major races.

=== 1947–1957: Indianapolis 500 ===
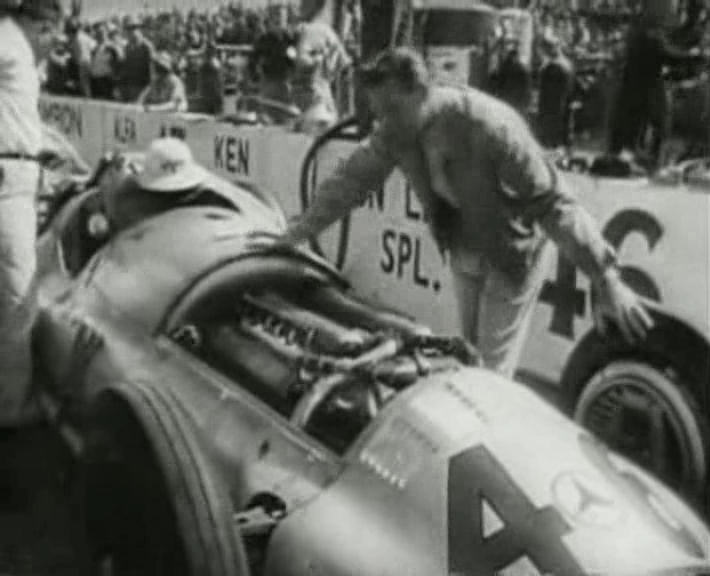
Don Lee's W154 at Indianapolis in 1947.

After the war, the W154 designated as chassis nine was discovered in Czechoslovakia. This was the car with which Lang had won the Coppa Ciano in 1938. The car was sold to Don Lee, an American racing team owner. During 1938, the rules for the Indianapolis 500 were modified to allow the European Grand Prix cars to compete, and in 1947, Lee entered his W154 with Duke Nalon as the driver. Nalon discovered that Riley Brett, an Offenhauser mechanic, had obtained some Mercedes engine blueprints. Nalon was able to make copies and from these, the team was able to prepare the engine. The mechanics started the engine but left it running on idle which caused the fuel to condense in the engine manifold. Due to the engine being mounted at an angle, the rear cylinders filled up with fuel, breaking the conrods and one piston. A new piston was hastily sand cast in time for the race.

Although Nalon set the second fastest qualifying speed, the qualifying system meant that he would start the race from 18th position. During the race, the replacement piston failed after 119 laps and the car had to retire from the race.

Nalon was not rehired for the 1948 race. Ralph Hepburn was to be the driver, having not found a drive for the previous season's race. Hepburn later decided to instead drive a Novi for team owner Lew Welch. Meanwhile, one of Welch's drivers, Chet Miller, had decided that the Novi was too difficult to drive. Miller agreed to drive the W154 for Don Lee. He qualified the car in 19th position, but come the race, had to rely on a relief driver after 29 laps. Ken Fowler took over on lap 30 and he handed it over to Louis Tomei on lap 50. Tomei continued through to lap 108, when the car had to retire with oil problems.

In 1949, Don Lee sold his W154 to Joel Thorne, another team owner. Thorne had the Mercedes engine removed and a Sparks straight-six engine installed. The car's bonnet no longer fit, so a new one had to be manufactured. Thorne drove the car himself, but failed to qualify for the race.

Alfred Neubauer attended the 1949 race, in order to investigate the feasibility of a works Mercedes entry at Indianapolis. Neubauer studied Lew Welch's Novi team, and based on the information he had gained, Mercedes attempted to adapt the W154 for oval racing.

Mercedes also had the pre-war 1500cc Voiturette (F2) Mercedes-Benz W165 which won the 1939 Tripoli Grand Prix and still was qualified for Grand Prix racing according to outgoing rules. The company studied concepts for a new Mercedes-Benz W195 GP car but then waited for new rules to be published that were come in effect in 1954, for which Mercedes-Benz W196 was made.

Another target was an entry in the 1951 Indianapolis 500. For two Formula Libre races in the "Temporada Argentina" series that year, the February 1951 Buenos Aires Grand Prix (I) and 1951 Buenos Aires Grand Prix (II), three W154 cars were shipped there and entered, with Herrmann Lang, newcomer Karl Kling and home favorite Juan Manuel Fangio driving. Only the modern supercharged Ferrari 166 FL of José Froilán González could beat the outdated Mercedes, but second-place finishes is not was Mercedes was aiming for. Mercedes discontinued the W154 programme.

The ex-Don Lee W154 made one final appearance at Indianapolis in 1957. The car was now owned by Edward Shreve, and had a Jaguar straight-six engine fitted. Danny Kladis drove the car, but failed to qualify for the race.

== Complete results ==
=== Race results ===
==== European Championship results ====
Year	Team	Engine	Drivers	1	2	3	4
1938	Daimler-Benz AG	Mercedes-Benz M154		FRA	GER	SUI	ITA
1938	Daimler-Benz AG	Mercedes-Benz M154	Hermann Lang	**3**	Ret	10	**Ret**
1938	Daimler-Benz AG	Mercedes-Benz M154	Manfred von Brauchitsch	1	**Ret**	3	Ret
1938	Daimler-Benz AG	Mercedes-Benz M154	Rudolf Caracciola	2	2	1	3
1938	Daimler-Benz AG	Mercedes-Benz M154	Richard Seaman		1	**2**	Ret
1939	Daimler-Benz AG	Mercedes-Benz M163		BEL	FRA	GER	SUI
1939	Daimler-Benz AG	Mercedes-Benz M163	Hermann Lang	1	**Ret**	**Ret**	**1**
1939	Daimler-Benz AG	Mercedes-Benz M163	Manfred von Brauchitsch	3	Ret	Ret	3
1939	Daimler-Benz AG	Mercedes-Benz M163	Rudolf Caracciola	Ret	Ret	1	2
1939	Daimler-Benz AG	Mercedes-Benz M163	Richard Seaman	Ret			
1939	Daimler-Benz AG	Mercedes-Benz M163	Heinz Brendel			Ret	
1939	Daimler-Benz AG	Mercedes-Benz M163	Hans Hartmann				6

Colour	Result	Points
Gold	Winner	1
Silver	2nd place	2
Bronze	3rd place	3
Green	Completed more than 75%	4
Blue	Completed between 50% and 75%	5
Purple	Completed between 25% and 50%	6
Red	Completed less than 25%	7
Black	Disqualified	8
Blank	Did not participate	8

**Bold** – Pole
Italics – Fastest lap

==== Non-championship results ====
Year	Event	Venue	Driver	Result	Category	Report
1938	Pau Grand Prix	Pau	Rudolf Caracciola; Hermann Lang	2	Grand Prix	Report
1938	Tripoli Grand Prix	Mellaha	Hermann Lang	1	Grand Prix †	Report
1938	Tripoli Grand Prix	Mellaha	Manfred von Brauchitsch	2	Grand Prix †	Report
1938	Tripoli Grand Prix	Mellaha	Rudolf Caracciola	3	Grand Prix †	Report
1938	Coppa Ciano	Livorno	Hermann Lang	1	Grand Prix	Report
1938	Coppa Ciano	Livorno	Rudolf Caracciola	Ret	Grand Prix	Report
1938	Coppa Ciano	Livorno	Manfred von Brauchitsch	DSQ	Grand Prix	Report
1938	Coppa Acerbo	Pescara	Rudolf Caracciola	1	Grand Prix	Report
1938	Coppa Acerbo	Pescara	Hermann Lang	Ret	Grand Prix	Report
1938	Coppa Acerbo	Pescara	Manfred von Brauchitsch	Ret	Grand Prix	Report
1938	Donington Grand Prix	Donington Park	Hermann Lang	2	Grand Prix	Report
1938	Donington Grand Prix	Donington Park	Richard Seaman	3	Grand Prix	Report
1938	Donington Grand Prix	Donington Park	Manfred von Brauchitsch	5	Grand Prix	Report
1938	Donington Grand Prix	Donington Park	Walter Bäumer	Ret	Grand Prix	Report
1939	Pau Grand Prix	Pau	Hermann Lang	1	Grand Prix	Report
1939	Pau Grand Prix	Pau	Manfred von Brauchitsch	2	Grand Prix	Report
1939	Pau Grand Prix	Pau	Rudolf Caracciola	Ret	Grand Prix	Report
1939	Eifelrennen	Nürburgring	Hermann Lang	1	Grand Prix	Report
1939	Eifelrennen	Nürburgring	Rudolf Caracciola	3	Grand Prix	Report
1939	Eifelrennen	Nürburgring	Manfred von Brauchitsch	4	Grand Prix	Report
1939	Eifelrennen	Nürburgring	Hans Hartmann	8	Grand Prix	Report
1939	Eifelrennen	Nürburgring	Richard Seaman	Ret	Grand Prix	Report
1939	Belgrade City Race	Kalemegdan Park	Manfred von Brauchitsch	2	Grand Prix	Report
1939	Belgrade City Race	Kalemegdan Park	Hermann Lang	Ret	Grand Prix	Report
1947	Indianapolis 500	Indianapolis	Duke Nalon	Ret	American National Championship	Report
1948	Indianapolis 500	Indianapolis	Chet Miller*; Ken Fowler; Louis Tomei	Ret	American National Championship	Report
1949	Indianapolis 500	Indianapolis	Joel Thorne	DNQ	American National Championship	Report
1951	Buenos Aires Grand Prix	Costanera	Hermann Lang	2	Formula Libre	Report
1951	Buenos Aires Grand Prix	Costanera	Juan Manuel Fangio	3	Formula Libre	Report
1951	Buenos Aires Grand Prix	Costanera	Karl Kling	6	Formula Libre	Report
1951	Buenos Aires Grand Prix	Costanera	Karl Kling	2	Formula Libre	Report
1951	Buenos Aires Grand Prix	Costanera	Hermann Lang	3	Formula Libre	Report
1951	Buenos Aires Grand Prix	Costanera	Juan Manuel Fangio	Ret	Formula Libre	Report
1957	Indianapolis 500	Indianapolis	Danny Kladis	DNQ	American National Championship	Report

† The Grand Prix class was run at the same time as the Voiturette class.
* Fowler and Tomei were relief drivers for Miller. Miller drove laps 1-29, Fowler drove laps 30-50 and Tomei drove from 51 to 108, when the car retired.

==== Formula One results ====
Year	Team	Engine	Drivers	1	2	3	4	5	6	7	8
1957	Safety Auto Glass	Jaguar 3.4 I6		ARG	MON	500	FRA	GBR	GER	PES	ITA
1957	Safety Auto Glass	Jaguar 3.4 I6	Danny Kladis			DNQ					

=== Hill climb results ===
Year	Event	Venue	Driver	Result	Reference
1939	Höhenstraßen Rennen	Kahlenberg, Austria	Hermann Lang	1	

== See also ==
- Mercedes-Benz W165
- Mercedes-Benz W196
- Maserati 8CTF
- Auto Union racing cars
