= Mercedes-Benz W165 =

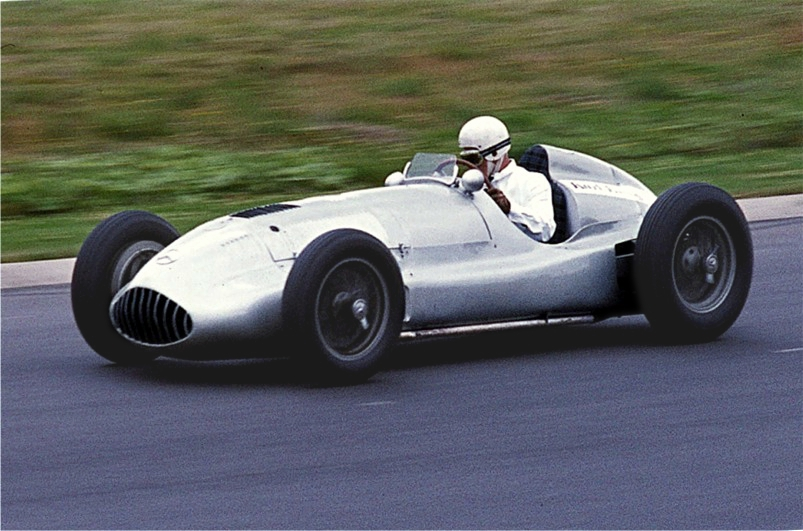
- Category: Voiturette
- Constructor: Mercedes-Benz
- Designers: Max Sailer; Albert Heess; Max Wagner; Rudolf Uhlenhaut

Technical specifications
- Chassis: Oval tubular frame
- Suspension (front): Independent suspension with wishbones, coil springs, hydraulic dampers
- Suspension (rear): De Dion tube, torsion bars, cockpit adjustable hydraulic dampers
- Axle track: 1,440 mm (57 in) (front); 1,280 mm (50 in) (rear)
- Wheelbase: 2,450 mm (96 in)
- Engine: M164 1.5 litre V8 90° supercharged front-engine, longitudinally mounted
- Transmission: Mercedes-Benz 5-speed
- Power: 254 horsepower

Competition history
- Notable entrants: Daimler-Benz AG
- Notable drivers: Rudolf Caracciola; Hermann Lang
- Debut: 1939 Tripoli Grand Prix
Races	Wins	Poles	F/Laps
1	1	0	1
- Drivers' Championships: 0

The Mercedes-Benz W165 is a racing car designed by Mercedes-Benz in late 1938 to meet voiturette (Formula 2) racing regulations, aimed at the 1939 Tripoli Grand Prix in Italian Libya.

== Background ==
Grand Prix cars were, since 1934, only restricted by a weight limit, and the power of supercharged unlimited engines had grown to over 600 hp in the 1937 Mercedes-Benz W125 and 500hp in the V16 Auto-Union Typ C, with competition from other Italian, French, British etc. brands fading away. Thus the Grand Prix cars for 1938 were limited to 3000cc capacity when supercharged. The V12 Mercedes-Benz W154 was built to these rules; it still had an output of over 450bhp, but was also lighter, so about as fast.

Alfa Romeo, Maserati, Bugatti and Delahaye were to race each other for the first time to the new formula while the Auto Union Typ D was not ready yet. Hermann Lang was the winner in the 12th Tripoli Grand Prix, on 15 May 1938.

== 1939 Tripoli Grand Prix ==
The Italian organizers had held Formula Libre races in connection with a state lottery, but after the fourth consecutive dominant race win by German Silver Arrows Grand Prix cars, Mercedes-Benz W154 and Auto-Union Typ D, changed the rules to attract more entrants and to give the smaller Alfa Romeo 158 and Maserati 4CL a chance at victory. Even German privateer entrants to use these cars, like Heinz Dipper and Paul Pietsch (1911 – 2012) who would go on to lead some laps in the 1939 German Grand Prix and finish it 3rd.

After learning about the change in September 1938, and believing that the Grand Prix car rules might get changed in a similar way, Daimler decided to develop such a Voiturette, a little car, also by scaling down the current racer.

The W165 car was built in eight months for this prestigious north African event, which was the time that the rules were changed by the Italian organizers; this was done as an attempt to avoid another dominant victory by German manufacturers Mercedes-Benz and Auto Union and to give Italian manufacturers Alfa Romeo and Maserati a chance at victory. The ruse failed as Lang and Rudolf Caracciola took their 165s to a 1–2 finish.. It was never raced again, but a private Caracciola entry in the 1946 Indy 500 was intended, and Daimler in 1951 briefly planned to build five new cars for F1 racing.

== Aftermath ==
The car had a 1,493 cc (91.1 cu in) capacity 64 mm × 58 mm (2.52 in × 2.28 in) supercharged V8 engine; it would have been eligible for the post war Grand Prix period from 1946 to 1951, but it never raced during that time, whereas the Alfa Romeo 158, one of the W165's competitors during the 1939 Tripoli Grand Prix was very much the dominant car during that time. The bigger and more powerful W154 was Mercedes's main Grand Prix car during 1939, so the W165 was only used once; there was hardly any other use for it.

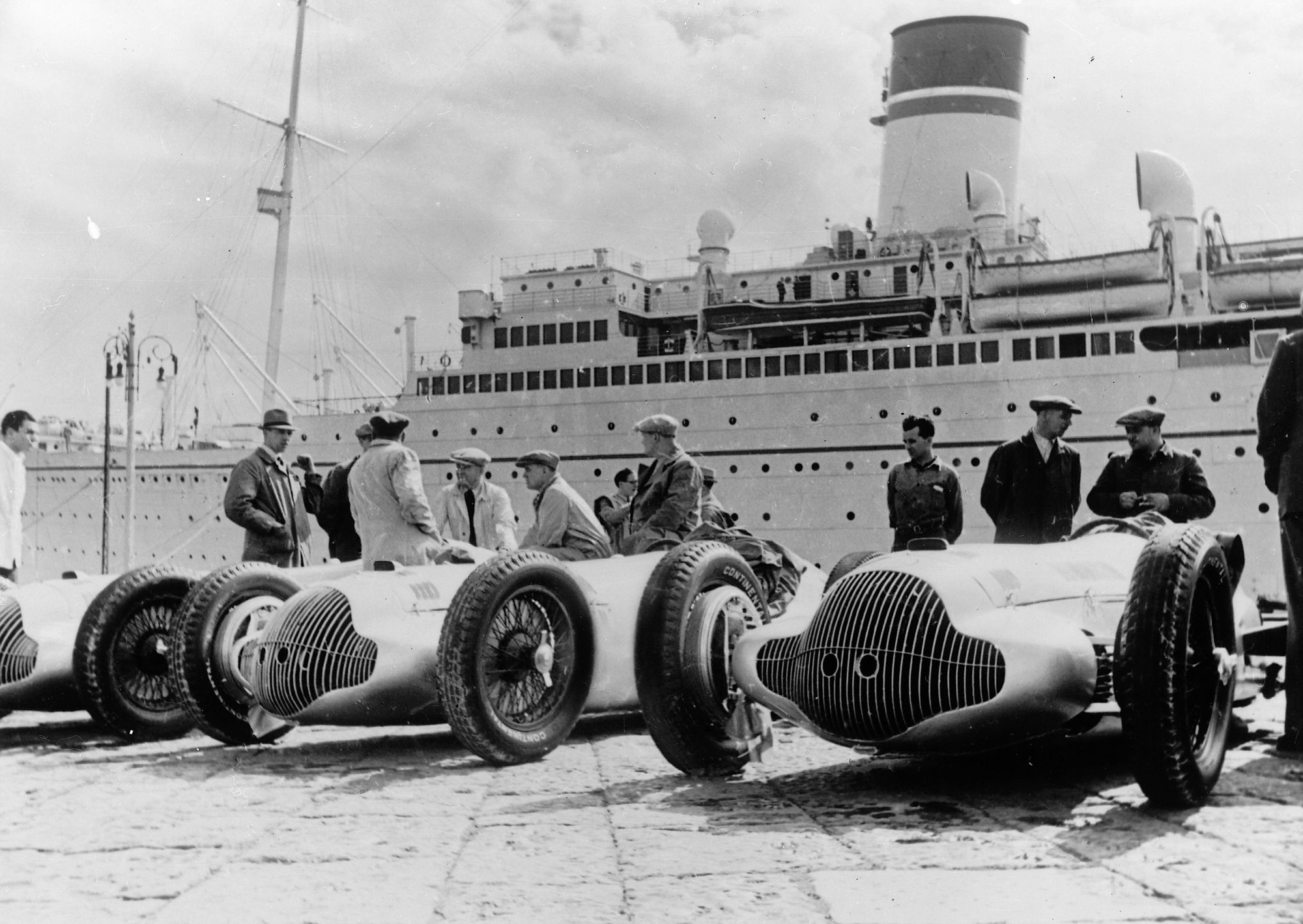
Three 1938 Mercedes-Benz W154 after landing in Tripoli

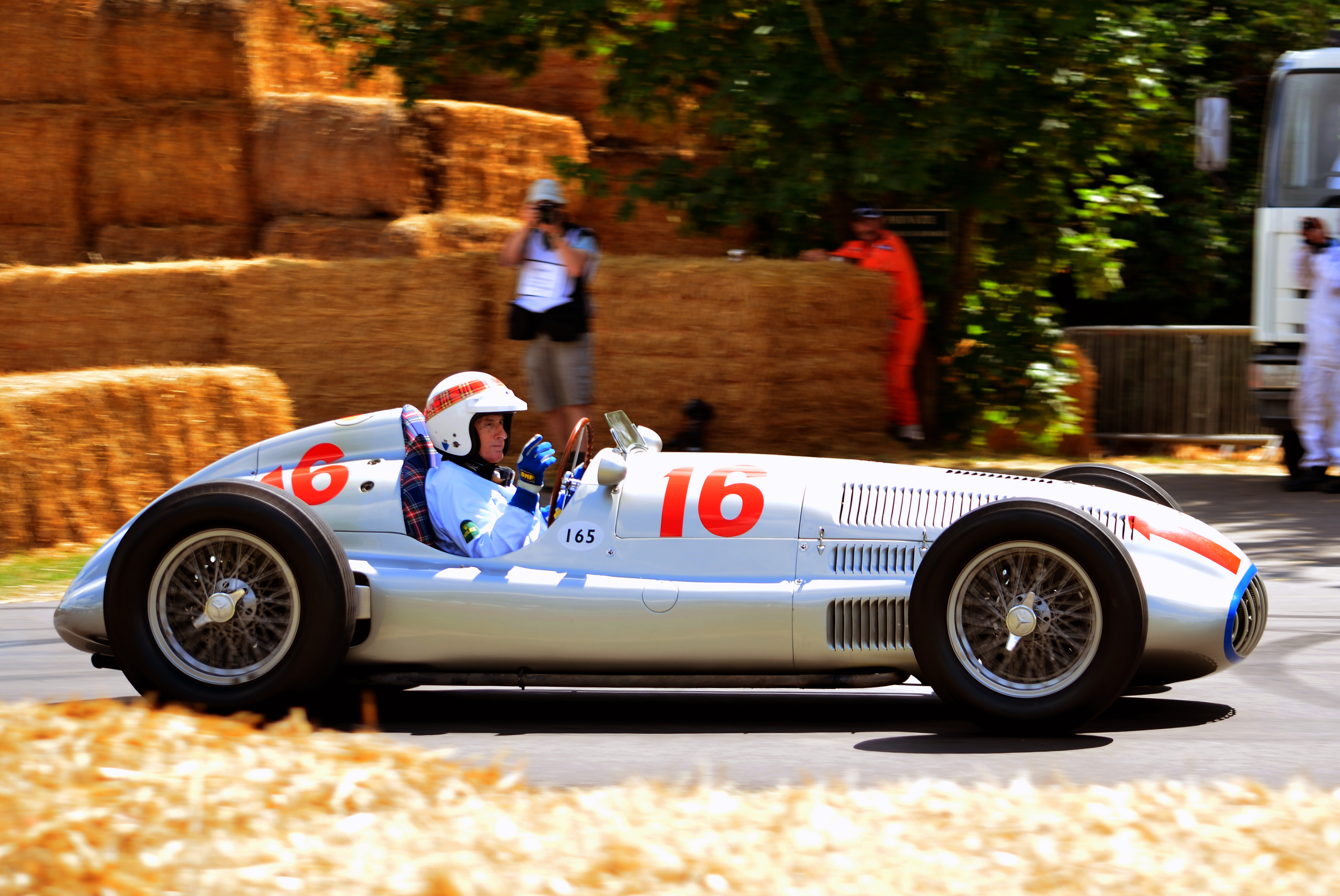
Jackie Stewart in the Mercedes-Benz W 165 at the Goodwood Festival of Speed 2014

Following an invitation by Indianapolis Motor Speedway owner Tony Hulman, Caracciola entered a W165 in the 1946 Indianapolis 500. However, Swiss customs refused to allow the car out of their country, preventing Caracciola from competing. On the other hand, a private W154 was raced at the 1947 Indy 500, and later. The factory raced three W154 in February 1951 Argentina Formula Libre races.

Daimler in 1951 assigned a budget to build five new W165, but shifted it to a new V12 Mercedes-Benz W195 concept that was cancelled soon as the rules were expected to expire.

== Technical data ==
Technical data	W165
Engine:	Front mounted 8 cylinder V engine
displacement:	1493 cm^{3}
Bore x stroke:	64 x 58mm
Max power at rpm:	254 hp (258 PS) at 8 250 rpm
Max torque at rpm:	245 N⋅m (181 lb⋅ft) at 6 500 rpm
Valve control:	2 overhead camshafts per cylinder row, 4 valves per cylinder
Upload:	Roots compressor
Gearbox:	5-speed manual
suspension front:	Double wishbones, coil springs, hydraulic shock absorbers
suspension rear:	De Dion axle, longitudinal torsion bar, hydraulic shock absorbers
Brakes:	Hydraulic drum brakes
Chassis & body:	Cross-shaped oval tube frame with aluminum body
Wheelbase:	245 cm
Dry weight:	About 715 kg

== Complete results ==
=== Non-championship results ===
Year	Event	Venue	Driver	Result	Category	Report
1939	Tripoli Grand Prix	Mellaha	Hermann Lang	1	Voiturette	Report
1939	Tripoli Grand Prix	Mellaha	Rudolf Caracciola	2	Voiturette	Report
