= Ferrari 166 FL =

Open-wheel race car

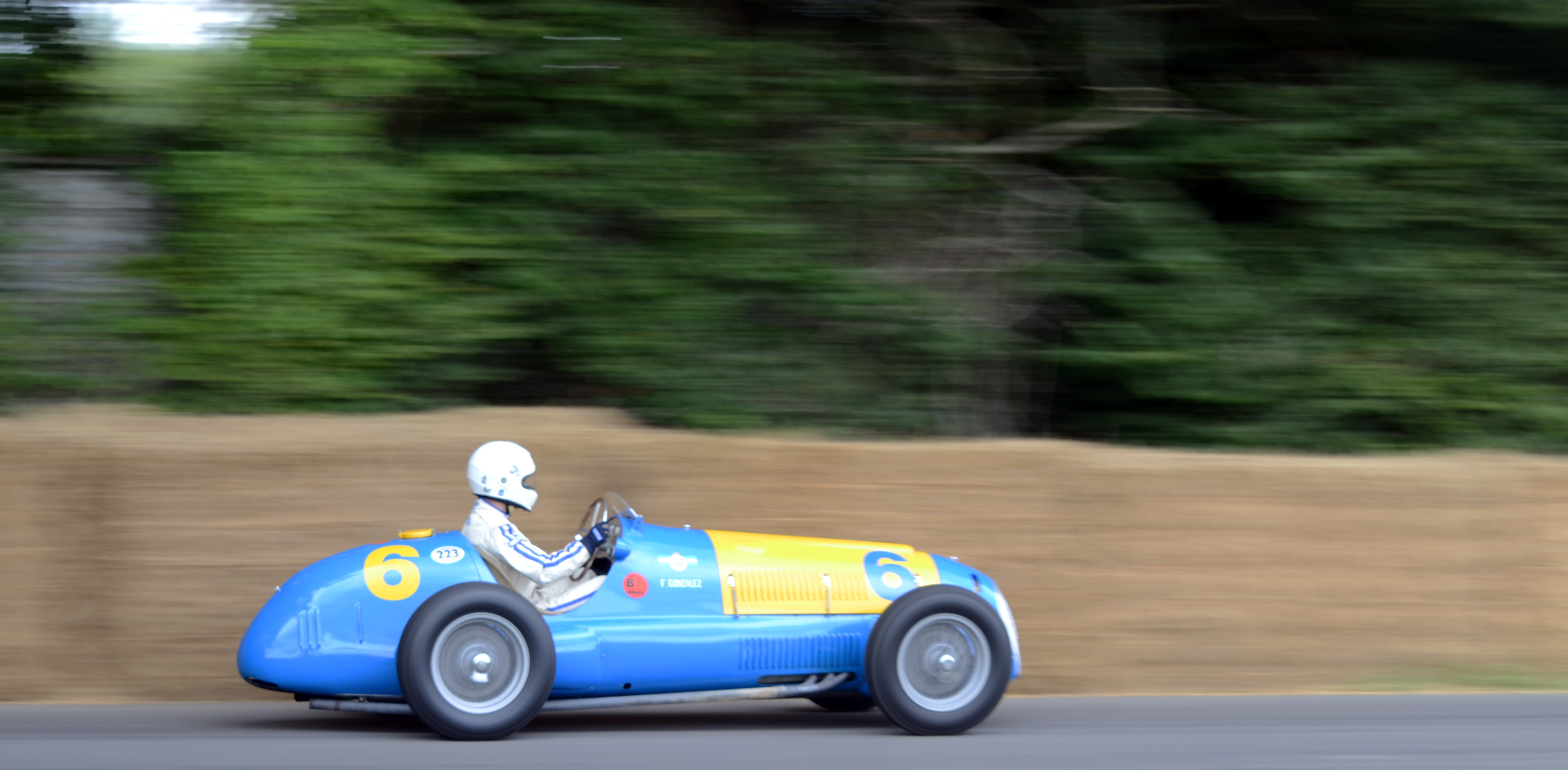
Ferrari 166 FL at Goodwood Festival of Speed 2017

The Ferrari 166 FL was a single-seat open-wheel race car, designed, developed and built by Italian manufacturer and team, Scuderia Ferrari, 1949 to 1952. Only three cars were produced. The designation 166 refers to the (rounded) displacement of a single cylinder, which corresponded to the nomenclature of the company at the time. The abbreviation FL stands for Formula Libre, which is the type of category and racing series that the car competed in. Since the car was mainly developed for racing in South America, it was also known as the 166 C America.

== History ==
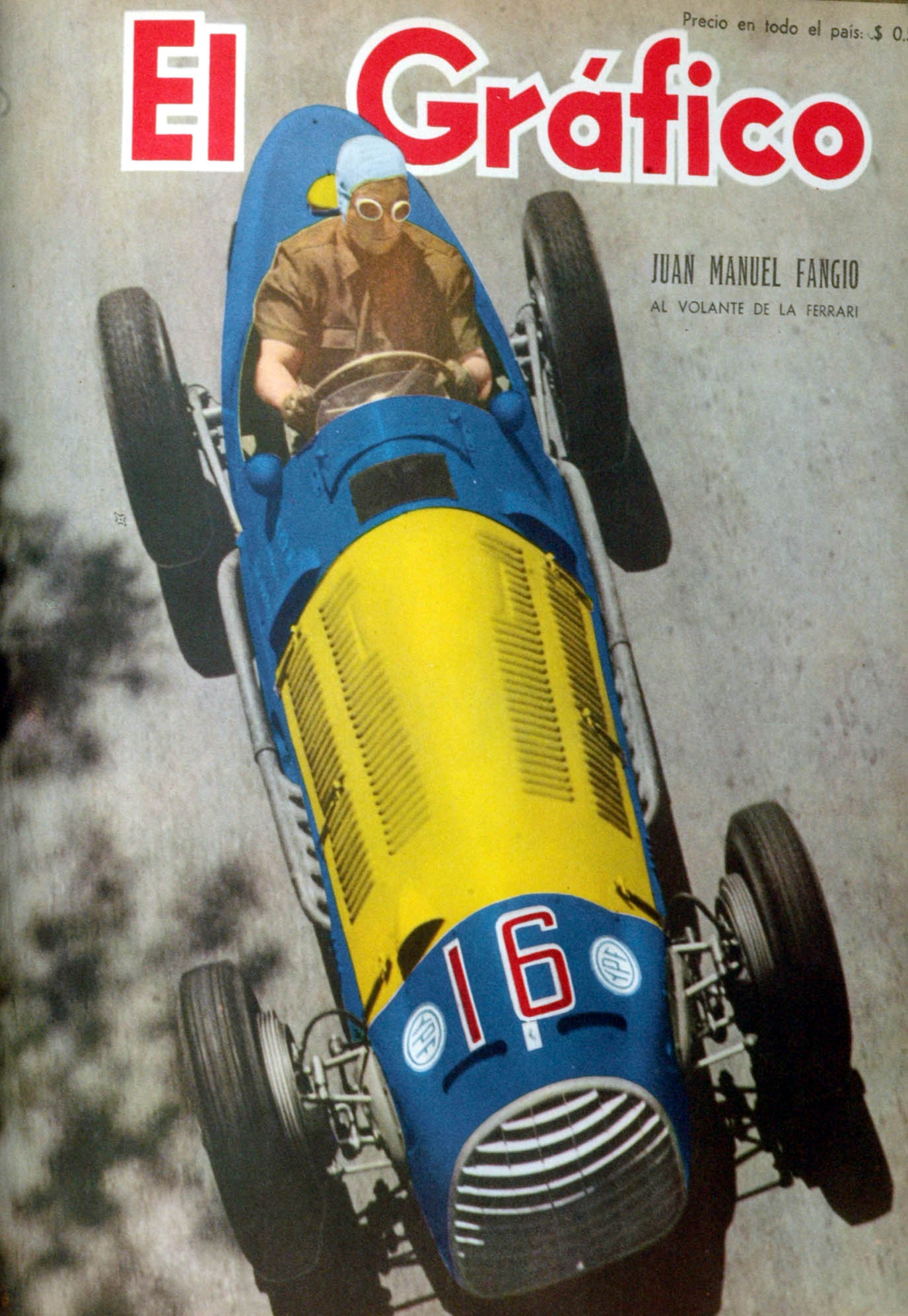
Ferrari 166 FL s/n 011F, here with the start no. 16 driven by Juan Manuel Fangio in 4th place at the 1950 Buenos Aires Grand Prix on 8 January 1950 at the Circuito Palermo

As race director at Alfa Romeo, Enzo Ferrari was successful in all major competitions. When he competed under his own name (and with his own vehicles) in 1947, he wanted to continue this success. To realize his ambitious plans, he had his then-chief designer, Gioacchino Colombo, design his own V12 engine, although Ferrari's experience with this type of engine was relatively limited. The aim was to equip the entire future Ferrari range of vehicles, including a sports racing car and a Grand Prix monoposto, with this engine.

The Ferrari 166 FL was developed to take part in races in the "Formula Libre series", which was extremely popular in South America at the time and had a broad set of rules. When the 166 FL was introduced, the regulations for Formula 2 allowed a maximum displacement of 2 liters, the statutes of the new Formula One, which was to start in 1950, saw a maximum displacement of 4.5 liters for naturally aspirated engines, and 1.5 liters for supercharged engines.

For Formula Libre, Ferrari decided to prepare a car whose engine came from the 166 F2, i.e. with a displacement of 1995 cm³, and was designed for Formula 2, and this with the supercharger, from the 125 F1 (designed to take part in the Formula 1 championship was developed). In this way, a sufficiently powerful and reliable engine was created for this purpose.

== Design ==
=== Engine ===
The Ferrari 166 FL had a longitudinally-mounted 60° V12 engine with a total displacement of 1995 cm³ and was supercharged with a Roots supercharger. The cylinder head and engine block were made of light alloy. Per cylinder bank, the engine had a single overhead camshaft, controlling two valves per cylinder. The mixture was prepared by three Weber carburetors of the type 40 DO3C, which were upstream of the compressor. The ignition was designed simply, the associated system had two magnets. The engine had dry-sump lubrication and a multi-plate clutch.

=== Chassis and suspension ===
The chassis was made of tubular steel and had a monoposto body.

The front wheels were individually suspended on double wishbones with a transverse leaf spring. A rigid axle with semi-elliptical leaf springs and an anti-roll bar was installed at the rear. Both suspensions had hydraulic Houdaille lever shock absorbers. The 166 FL had drum brakes on all four wheels. The manual transmission was designed for five gears plus reverse gear.

=== Performance ===
The engine's maximum output was 310 hp (231 kW) at 7000 rpm. With a weight of 740 kg, the FL 166 achieved a power-to-weight ratio of 0.42 hp/kg (0.19 hp/lb). The top speed of the 166 FL was 310 km/h (193 mph).

== Racing history ==
Between 1949 and 1952, the Ferrari 166 FL took part in the “Temporada Argentina” racing series in South America, which was part of the Formula Libre series of events. Here it proved very successful despite stiff competition from Alfa Romeo, Maserati, and Mercedes.

At the Temporada Argentina the most important victories were:

- Circuito Parco Indipendenza in Rosario on February 13, 1949 ("III. Coppa de Acciòn San Lorenzo") with Nino Farina
- Circuito Parco Palermo in Buenos Aires on December 18, 1949 ("III. Grand Prix Juan Domingo "Peron") with Alberto Ascari
- Urquiza Park Circuit in Paraná on November 12, 1950 ("Grand Prix City of Paranà") with Juan Manuel Fangio and José Froilán González
- Valdivia Norte Circuit in Santiago de Chile on December 18, 1950 ("GP Presidente Arturo Alessandri Palma"), again with Fangio and González
- 1951 Buenos Aires Grand Prix (I) and 1951 Buenos Aires Grand Prix (II), again González, against Fangio and others in Mercedes-Benz W154
- January 13, 1952; at the Interlagos Circuit of Sao Paulo ("VII Gran Premio Città di San Paolo") with Fangio
- Barra de Tujica Circuit in Rio de Janeiro on February 3, 1952 (“Grand Prix Quinta de Boa Vista”) with Fangio
- Piriapolis Circuit in Montevideo on March 30, 1952 (“Grand Prix of Montevideo”) again with Juan Manuel Fangio

== Chassis #011F ==
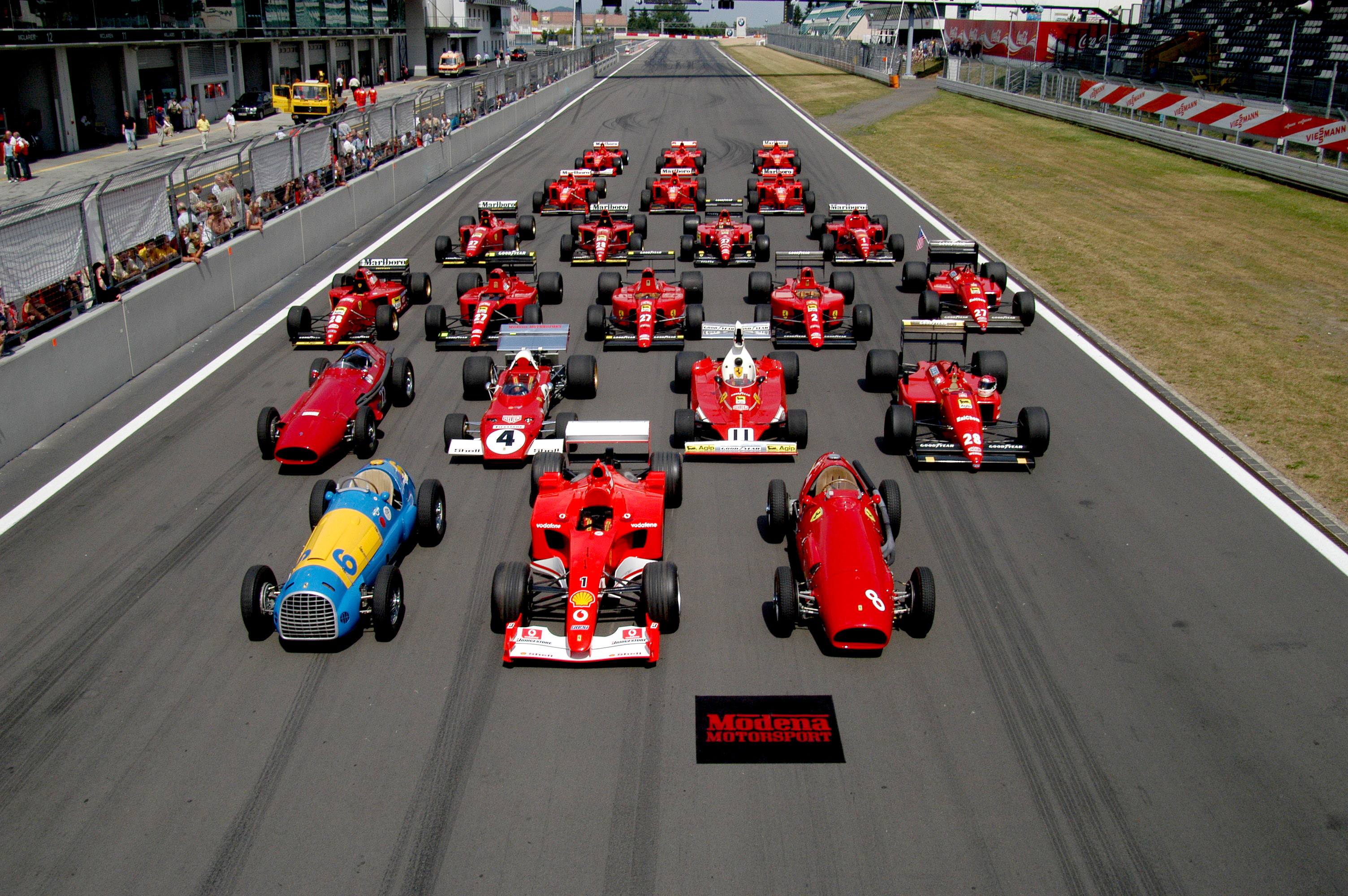
The 166 FL with chassis no. 011F (1st row, far left) at a Ferrari presentation at the Nürburgring in 2005

The Ferrari 166 with chassis no. 011F was originally built in 1949 for use in Formula 2. Entered that year by Scuderia Ferrari, with Juan Manuel Fangio at the wheel in the Monza Grand Prix on 26 June, the 166 took a debut win. The car was then purchased (with the support of the Argentine government) by Juan Manuel Fangio and used. The vehicle was repainted in the Argentine racing and national colors of blue with a yellow engine cover. Later that season the car was fitted with a Roots supercharger and entered under the designation FL in several Formula Libre races in South America by Fangio and Benedicto Campos. After a return to Europe in 1950, Fangio drove the car (now again without the supercharger) again in Formula 2, but with little success. 1951 returned the 166 (again as " FL" with supercharger) back to Argentina, and was quite successful until 1953 with José Froilán González at the wheel (3 wins, 3-second places, 1 third place). The car then remained in Argentina until it was discovered by Colin Crabbe in the late 1980s. He imported the car to the UK where it was extensively restored by Tony Merrick. Later owners included well-known collectors Carlos Monteverde and Christopher Cox. In 2003 the ex-Fangio Ferrari 166 FL was acquired by a German private collection. In 2017, the 166 FL was on display at the Goodwood Festival of Speed.
