= Mercedes-Benz W125 =

Racing car designed by Rudolf Uhlenhaut

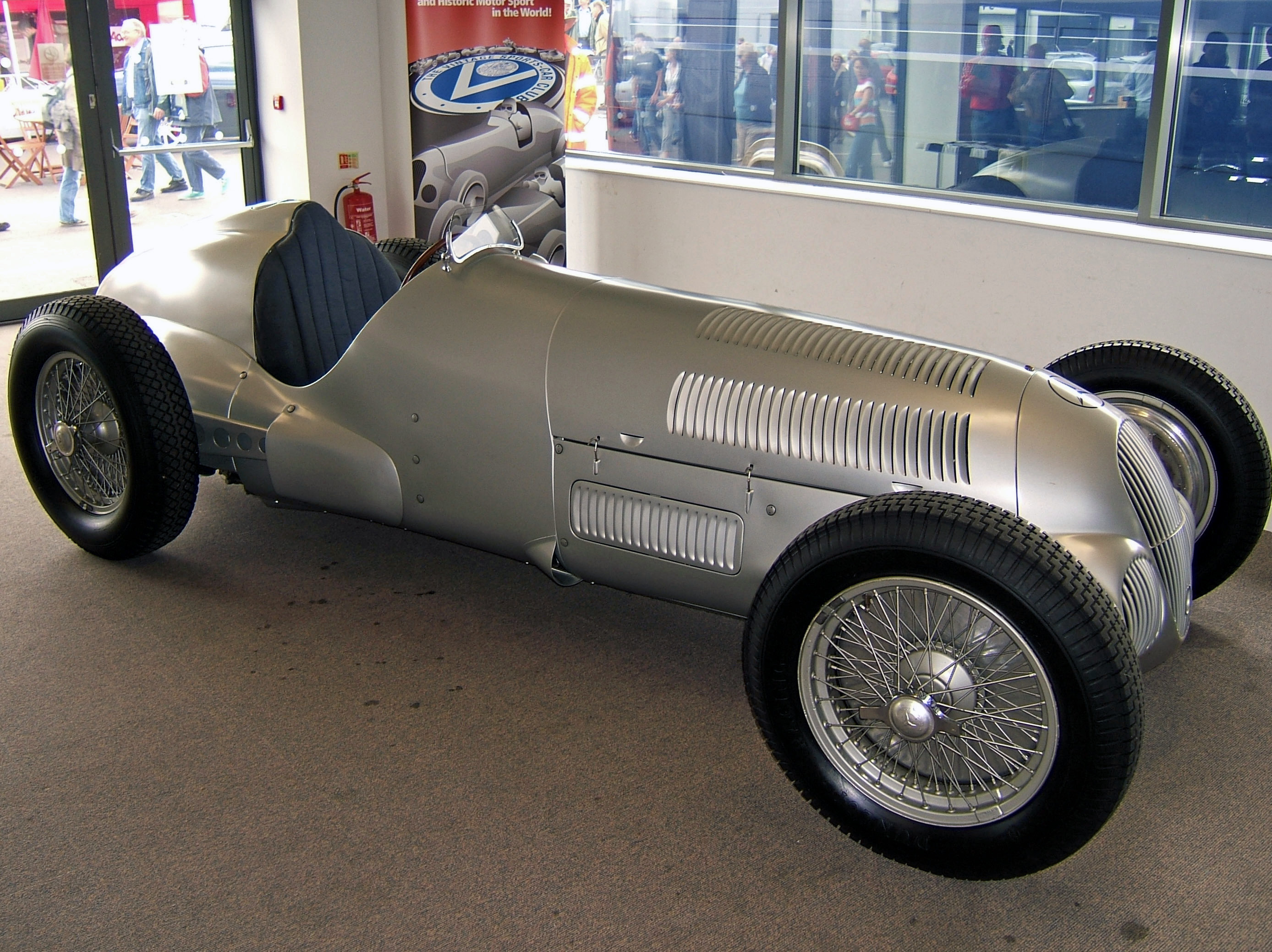
- Category: Grand Prix
- Constructor: Mercedes-Benz
- Designers: Max Sailer; Albert Heess; Max Wagner; Rudolf Uhlenhaut
- Predecessor: Mercedes-Benz W25
- Successor: Mercedes-Benz W154

Technical specifications
- Chassis: Tubular frame
- Suspension (front): Independent suspension with wishbones, coil springs, hydraulic dampers
- Suspension (rear): De Dion axle, torsion bars, hydraulic dampers
- Engine: Mercedes-Benz M125 5.663 litre Straight-8 supercharged
- Transmission: Mercedes-Benz 4-speed transverse
- Fuel: Methanol/benzole blend

Competition history
- Notable entrants: Daimler-Benz AG
- Notable drivers: Manfred von Brauchitsch; Rudolf Caracciola; Hermann Lang; Richard Seaman
- Debut: 1937 Tripoli Grand Prix
Races	Wins	Poles	F/Laps
12	6	6	6
- Drivers' Championships: 1

The Mercedes-Benz W125 was a Grand Prix racing car produced by German auto manufacturer Mercedes-Benz to race during the 1937 Grand Prix season. Designed by head designer Rudolf Uhlenhaut, the car was used by Rudolf Caracciola to win the 1937 European Championship and W125 drivers also finished in the second, third and fourth positions in the Championship In the same year, Mercedes W125 Record Speed was built.

The W125 was powered by a supercharged double overhead camshaft 5,663 cc (345.6 cu in) capacity 94 mm × 102 mm (3.70 in × 4.02 in) inline 8 which produced 595 hp (444 kW) in race trim. Its highest test bed power measured was 637 bhp (646 PS) at 5,800 rpm, with 245 bhp (248 PS) and 643 lb⋅ft (872 N⋅m) of torque developed at 2,000 rpm. In 1938, the engine capacity of supercharged Grand Prix cars was limited to 3000 cc, and the W125 was replaced by the Mercedes-Benz W154.

The W125 was considered the most powerful road racing car ever for three decades until large capacity American-built V8 engines in CanAm sports cars reached similar power in the late 1960s. In Grand Prix racing itself, the figure was not exceeded until the early 1980s, with the appearance of turbo-charged engines.

The W125 reached race speeds of well over 300 km/h (190 mph) in 1937, especially on the AVUS in Berlin, equipped with a streamlined body.

In land speed record runs, a Mercedes-Benz W125 Rekordwagen was clocked at 432.7 km/h (268.9 mph) over a mile and a kilometre. This car was fitted with a DAB V12 engine (82 x 88 mm) of 5,576.75 cc (5.6L, 340.31 CID) with a power of 726 hp (736 PS) at 5,800 rpm. The weight of this engine caused the car to weigh over the 750 kg maximum limit, so it never appeared in Grand Prix.

== Concept ==
Due to the uncompetitiveness of their W25 car, Mercedes pulled out of the 1936 Grand Prix Season midway through the year in order to concentrate on designing a car that would see them return to the top of the rankings. A new racing department ('Rennabteilung') was set up within Mercedes-Benz in order to work on the car. Rudolf Uhlenhaut, previously a production car engineer for the company, was selected to lead the design team in late 1936. Uhlenhaut had not previously designed a racing car, but had significant experience testing road cars on the Nürburgring race track, experience which allowed him to adapt his knowledge relatively easily to racing cars.

When testing the old W25 car, Uhlenhaut remarked that the suspension was too stiff, preventing the wheels from following the road. During the test session, a wheel came off the car, yet Uhlenhaut continued to drive the car as if nothing had happened. This stiffness caused the chassis to flex and the rear axle to bend by up to 7–10 cm (2.8–3.9 in) under braking. The brief for the new car included a stiffer chassis and more travel on the suspension to avoid the problems experienced in the 1936 car.

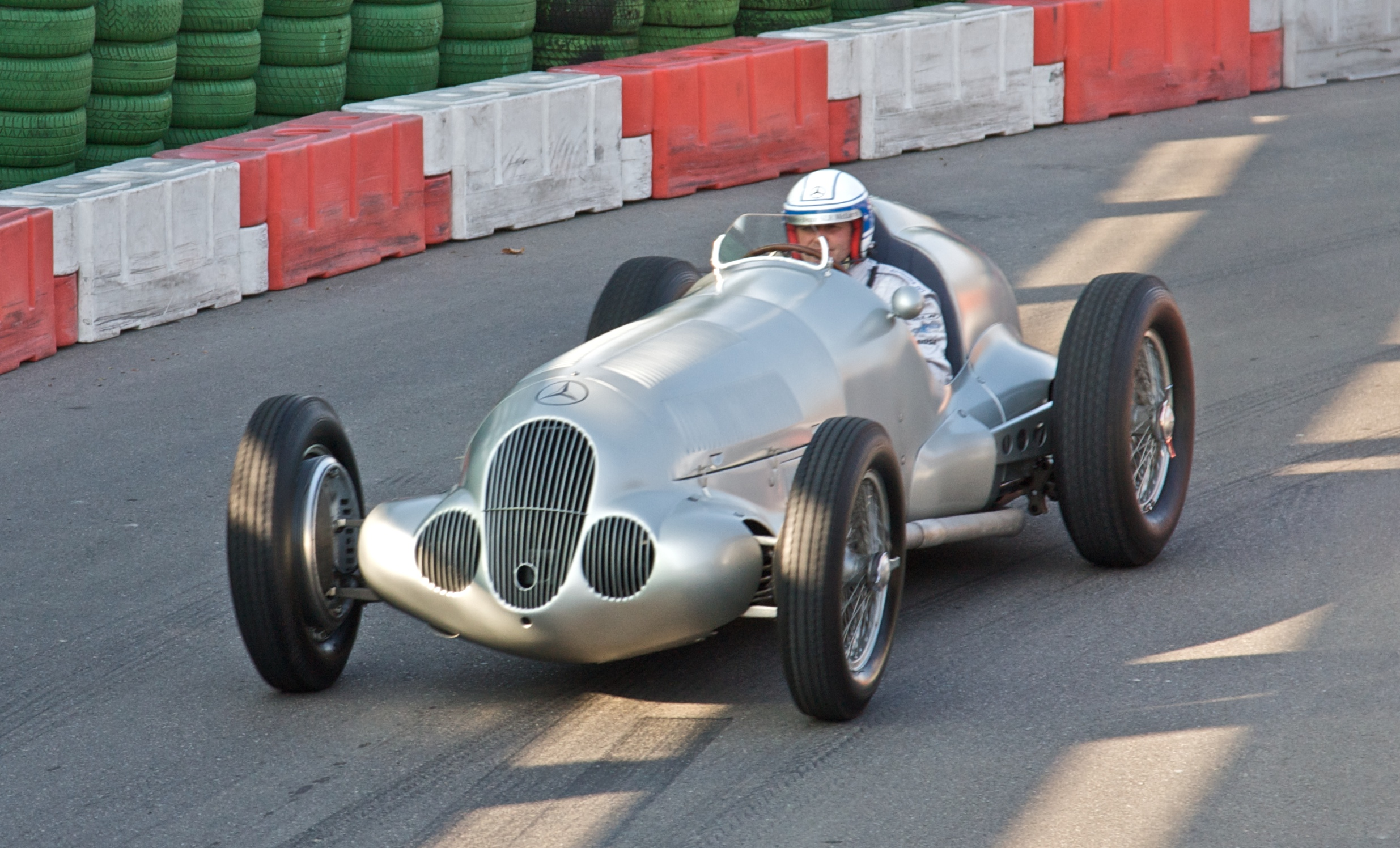
Mercedes-Benz W125 Stuttgart

== Technical Data ==
Technical data	W125
Engine:	Front mounted 8-cylinder in-line engine
displacement:	5663 cm^{3}
Bore x stroke:	94 x 102mm
Max power at rpm:	560–595 hp at 5 800 rpm
Valve control:	2 overhead camshafts, 4 valves per cylinder
Upload:	Roots compressor
Gearbox:	4-speed manual
suspension front:	Double wishbones, coil springs, hydraulic shock absorbers
suspension rear:	De Dion axle, longitudinal torsion bar, hydraulic shock absorbers
Brakes:	Hydraulic drum brakes
Chassis & body:	Cross-shaped oval tube frame with aluminum body
Wheelbase:	280 cm
Dry weight:	About 750 kg
Top speed:	320 km/h

== Chassis and suspension ==
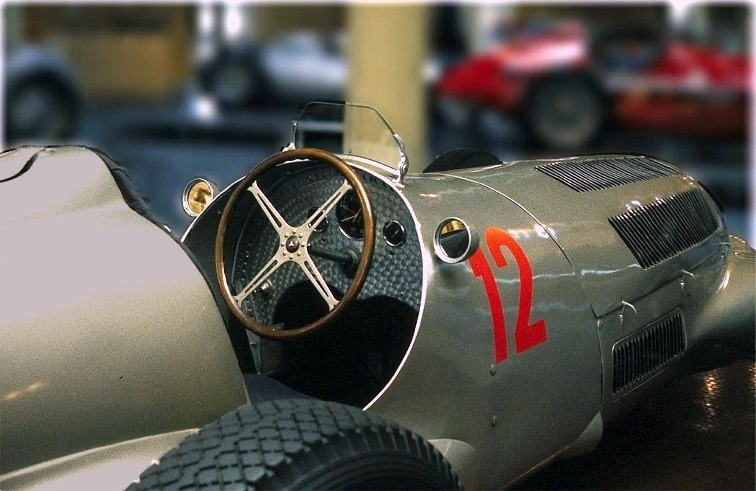
The W125 cockpit

The W125 had a much stiffer tubular frame construction compared to the previous W25 model. This was achieved using oval tubes made of nickel-chrome molybdenum steel which flexed considerably less than the frame used in the W25.

The bodywork of the W125 was aluminium, which like its predecessor was left unpainted in its bare silver colour. This brought Mercedes' cars during this period (and rivals Auto Union, whose cars were the same colour) the nickname of Silver Arrows, the racing colours of Germany being silver (German racing colours were white but stripped paint to the aluminium for weight savings).

== Engine and transmission ==
In the absence of any limitation on engine size (and only a 750 kg (1,650 lb) total car weight limit to work against), Mercedes designed a supercharged double overhead camshaft 5.7 litre inline 8 engine for the W125. Bore & stroke were 94 mm × 102 mm (3.70 in × 4.02 in) and actual displacement was 5,662.85 cc (345.57 cu in). Utilizing a Roots type blower the M125 produced 632 lb⋅ft (857 N⋅m) of torque at the start of the season. The engines built varied in power, attaining an output between 560 and 595 horse power (418-444 kW) at 5800 rpm- an incredible figure for the time. Fuel used was a custom mix of 40% methyl alcohol, 32% benzene, 24% ethyl alcohol and 4% gasoline light. The engine weighed 222 kg (489 lb) - approximately 30% of the total weight of the car, and was mounted in the front of the car. The engine ran rough, but if it started running smooth, the crankshaft would begin to crack.

Like its W25 predecessor, the W125 used a 4-speed manual transmission. The gearbox design was changed to a constant mesh type, which provided better reliability compared to the sliding mesh transmission of the M25. In a constant mesh gearbox, the transmission gears are always in mesh and rotating, but the gears are not rigidly connected to the shafts on which they rotate. Instead, the gears can freely rotate or be locked to the shaft on which they are carried.

Mercedes-Benz W125
Mercedes-Benz W125 at Goodwood Festival of Speed 2009

== Racing history ==
The W125 made its first competitive outing in May at the 1937 Tripoli Grand Prix with Mercedes-Benz entering four cars. German Hermann Lang won his first Grand Prix motor race to give the W125 a victory on its debut and provide Mercedes with their first victory over rivals Auto Union since May 1936. The next race was held at the AVUS motor-racing circuit in Germany, a 12-mile (19 km) long circuit consisting of two long straights of approximately 6 miles (10 km) length joined at either end by a curve. As such, it was possible for a car to reach its top speed. Mercedes entered two W125 cars, a streamliner which was modified from the original design to increase its top speed on the straights and a standard car driven by Richard Seaman in case of problems with the streamliner. The streamliner had a top speed 25 km/h (16 mph) faster than the regular car. On lap three of the race, the streamliner retired while leading due to a gearbox failure. Seaman's regular W125 finished in fifth position.

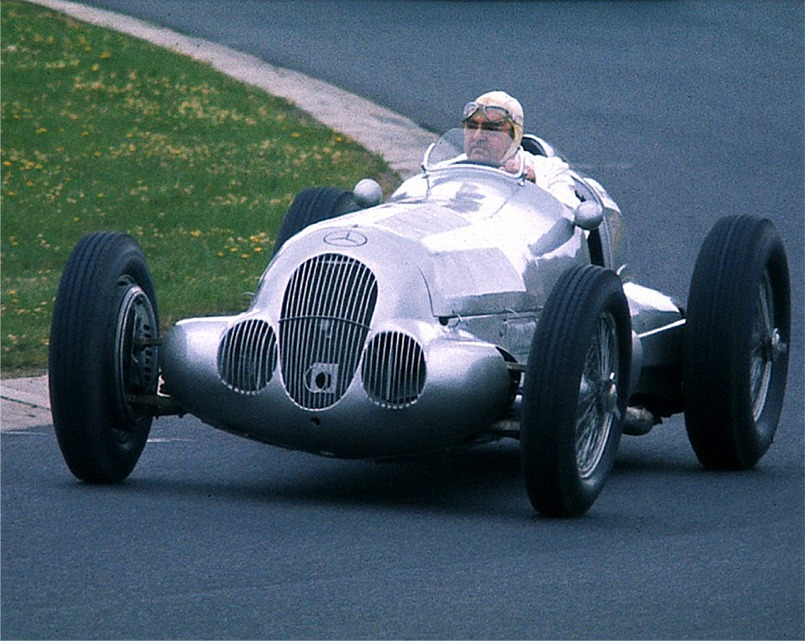
Hermann Lang demonstrating a Mercedes-Benz W125 at the Nürburgring in 1977. Lang drove a W125 to victory on its debut.

At the Eifelrennen held at the Nürburgring circuit, Mercedes entered five W125's, including one driven by Christian Kautz fitted with the new suction carburettor supercharger system. Kautz finished in ninth, while teammates Rudolf Caracciola and Manfred von Brauchitsch finished in second and third places. For the next race, Mercedes split their entries between two races which occurred within a week of another. Two cars were sent to the US to compete in the Vanderbilt Cup, one of which was fitted with the suction carburettor supercharger used on Kautz's car, and three cars went to Belgium to compete in the first round of the 1937 European Championship. Richard Seaman finished second in the Vanderbilt, and third and fourth place were achieved in the Belgian Grand Prix. Following Seaman's success in the Vanderbilt with the new supercharger system, it was fitted to all of the W125s.

The following two races were also both part of the European Championship. The next round in Germany saw both Mercedes and rivals Auto Union competing on home soil. Mercedes triumphed, as Rudolf Caracciola took his first victory of the year and Manfred von Brauchitsch followed him home in second position. In the next round at Monaco, the positions were reversed as von Brauchitsch won and Caracciola finished in second. A third Mercedes W125, driven by Christian Kautz, took third place.

The non-championship Coppa Acerbo in Italy was the next event the W125 entered. During practice Richard Seaman crashed into a house and destroyed his car. Therefore, only von Brauchitsch and Caracciola started the race. During the race, Seaman took over from Caracciola and despite an engine fire, he finished the race fifth. von Brauchitsch fared better finishing in second position. The Swiss Grand Prix was the penultimate round of the 1937 European Championship. Like in Monaco, Mercedes W125s finished in the top three places, Caracciola taking the win with Hermann Lang in second and von Brauchitsch third. The final round of the championship marked a return to Italy, where at the Livorno Circuit, Caracciola held off teammate Lang to win the race by 0.4 seconds and become European Champion. von Brauchitsch retired from the race and took second place overall in the Championship. Kautz and Lang took third and fourth places meaning Mercedes drivers occupied the top four positions in the championship table.

The W125 entered into two non-championship events before the end of the season. The Masaryk Grand Prix in Czechoslovakia gave the W125 its final victory when Caracciola won the race, von Brauchitsch finished second and Seaman came in third. The race was marred as Hermann Lang had crashed into spectators on lap five, resulting in twelve injuries and two deaths.

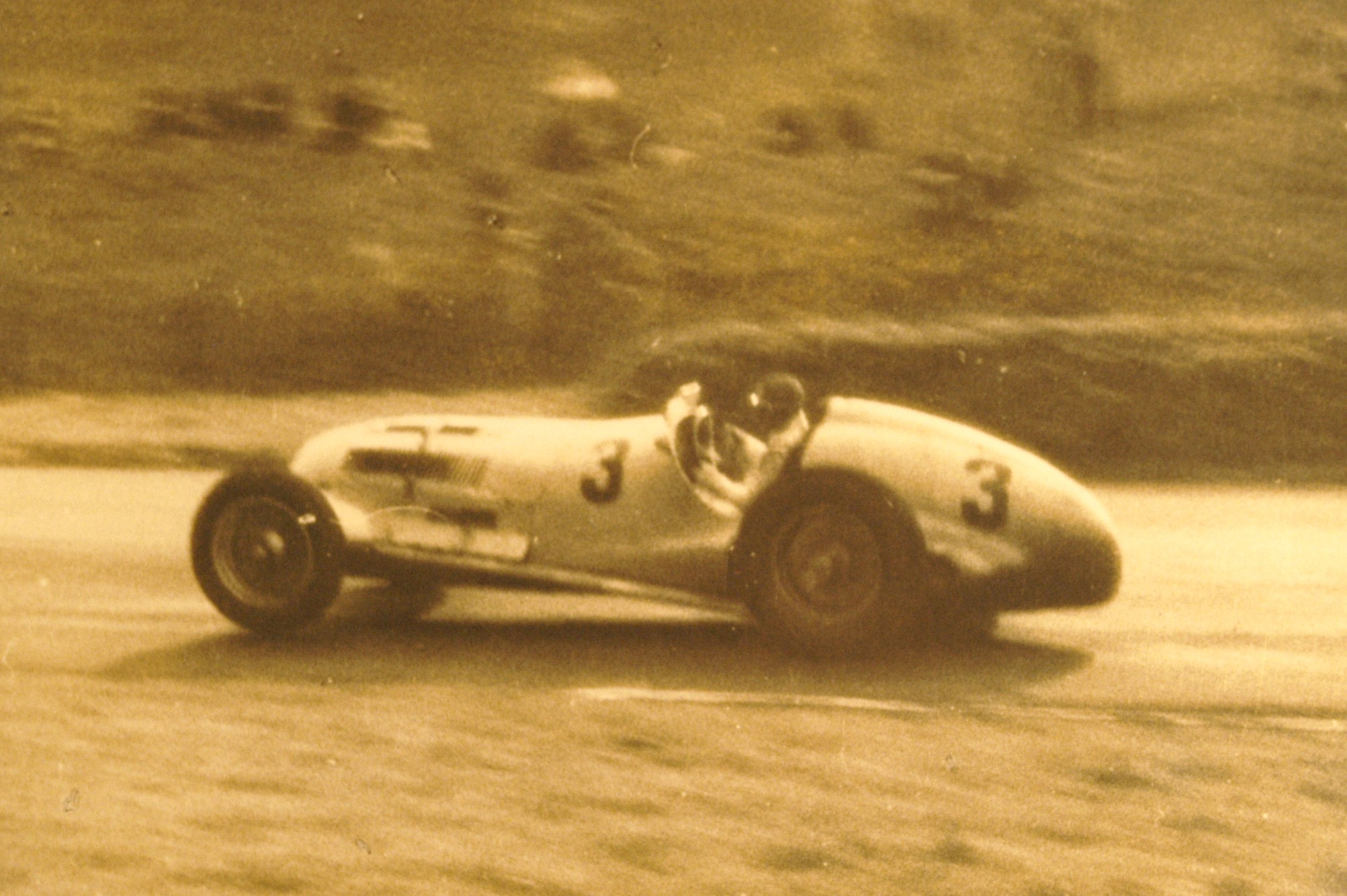
Manfred Von Brauchitsch driving the W125 at the 1937 Donington Grand Prix

The final competitive race Mercedes entered the W125 into was the 1937 Donington Grand Prix. Rosemeyer prevailed, von Brauchitsch finished in second place and Caracciola in third while both of the other W125s failed to finish. The British ERA were outclassed, failing to get classified in their home race.

== Retirement from racing ==
1938 saw changes in the rules, with the maximum limit on weight being replaced with a maximum limit on engine capacity and a minimum weight for the car being introduced; the W125 was no longer eligible for entry without major modification. Instead, Mercedes-Benz developed a new car, the W154, and the W125 was withdrawn from racing.

== Complete results ==
=== European Championship ===
(results in bold indicate pole position)

Year	Team	Engine	Drivers	1	2	3	4	5
1937	Daimler-Benz AG	Mercedes-Benz M125		BEL	GER	MON	SUI	ITA
1937	Daimler-Benz AG	Mercedes-Benz M125	Hermann Lang	3	7		2	2
1937	Daimler-Benz AG	Mercedes-Benz M125	Christian Kautz	4	6	3	6	Ret
1937	Daimler-Benz AG	Mercedes-Benz M125	Manfred von Brauchitsch	Ret	2	1	3	Ret
1937	Daimler-Benz AG	Mercedes-Benz M125	Rudolf Caracciola		1	2	1	1
1937	Daimler-Benz AG	Mercedes-Benz M125	Richard Seaman		Ret			4
1937	Daimler-Benz AG	Mercedes-Benz M125	Goffredo Zehender			5		

Colour	Result	Points
Gold	Winner	1
Silver	2nd place	2
Bronze	3rd place	3
Green	Completed more than 75%	4
Blue	Completed between 50% and 75%	5
Purple	Completed between 25% and 50%	6
Red	Completed less than 25%	7
Black	Disqualified	8
Blank	Did not participate	8

=== Non-championship results ===
Year	Team	Engine	Drivers	1	2	3	4	5	6	7
1937	Daimler-Benz AG	Mercedes-Benz M125		TRI	AVUS	EIF	VAN	ACE	MAS	DON
1937	Daimler-Benz AG	Mercedes-Benz M125	Hermann Lang	1		9			DNF	DNF
1937	Daimler-Benz AG	Mercedes-Benz M125	Rudolf Caracciola	6	DNF	2	DNF	5†	1	3
1937	Daimler-Benz AG	Mercedes-Benz M125	Richard Seaman	7	5	DNF	2	DNS/5†	4	DNF
1937	Daimler-Benz AG	Mercedes-Benz M125	Manfred von Brauchitsch	DNF		3		2	2	2

†Seaman's car was destroyed in practice and did not start. During the race, Seaman took over Caracciola's car and finished fifth.
