= 1951 Buenos Aires Grand Prix (II) =

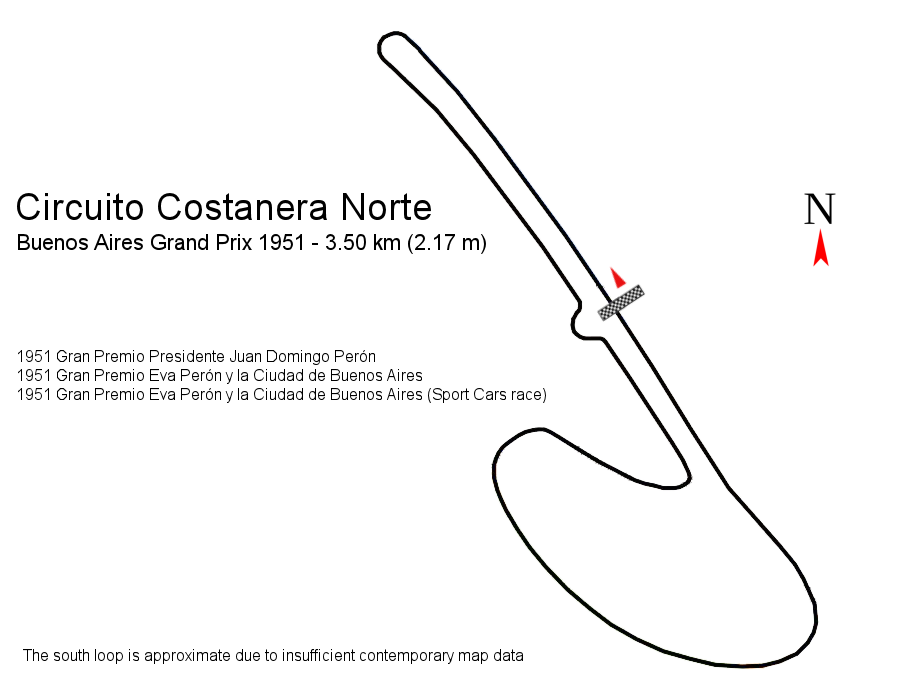

Race details
- Date: February 25, 1951
- Official name: V Gran Premio Extraordinario de Eva Duarte Perón
- Location: Aeroparque Costanera Buenos Aires
- Course: Public roads
- Course length: 3.50 km (2.17 miles)
- Distance: 45 laps, 157.5 km (90.689 miles)

Pole position
Driver	(Argentina) Juan Manuel Fangio	Mercedes

Fastest lap
Driver	(Argentina) José Froilán González	Ferrari
- Time: 1:58.6 (106.24 km/h / 66.1 m/h)

Podium
First	(Argentina) José Froilán González	Ferrari
Second	(Germany) Karl Kling	Mercedes
Third	(Germany) Hermann Lang	Mercedes

The second of three 1951 Buenos Aires Grand Prix (official name: V Gran Premio Extraordinario de Eva Duarte Perón) was a Formula Libre Grand Prix motor race that took place on February 25, 1951, at the Costanero Norte street circuit in Buenos Aires, Argentina.

== Classification ==
Pos	Driver	Constructor	Laps	Time/Retired
1	(Argentina) José Froilán González	Ferrari 166 FL	45	1:35:40.6
2	(Germany) Karl Kling	Mercedes-Benz W154	45	1:37:53.1
3	(Germany) Hermann Lang	Mercedes-Benz W154	43	1:36:30.5"
4	(Argentina) Jorge Daponte	Maserati 4CLT	43	N/A
5	(Argentina) Carlos Menditeguy	Alfa Romeo 8C 308	36	DNF
Ret	(Argentina) Alfredo Pian	Maserati 4CL	23	DNF
Ret	(Argentina) Juan Manuel Fangio	Mercedes-Benz W154	18	DNF
Ret	(Argentina) Clemar Bucci	Alfa Romeo 12C-37	18	DNF
Ret	(Argentina) Óscar Alfredo Gálvez	Ferrari 166 FL	12	DNF
Ret	(Argentina) Luis Alberto de Dios	Simca-Gordini T-15	11	DNF
Ret	(Argentina) Hector Niemitz	Alfa Romeo 2.9 sc	9	DNF
Ret	(Argentina) Pascual Puópolo	Maserati	7	DNF
