= 1951 Buenos Aires Grand Prix (I) =

- Race Formula Libre of in the 1951 Formula One season
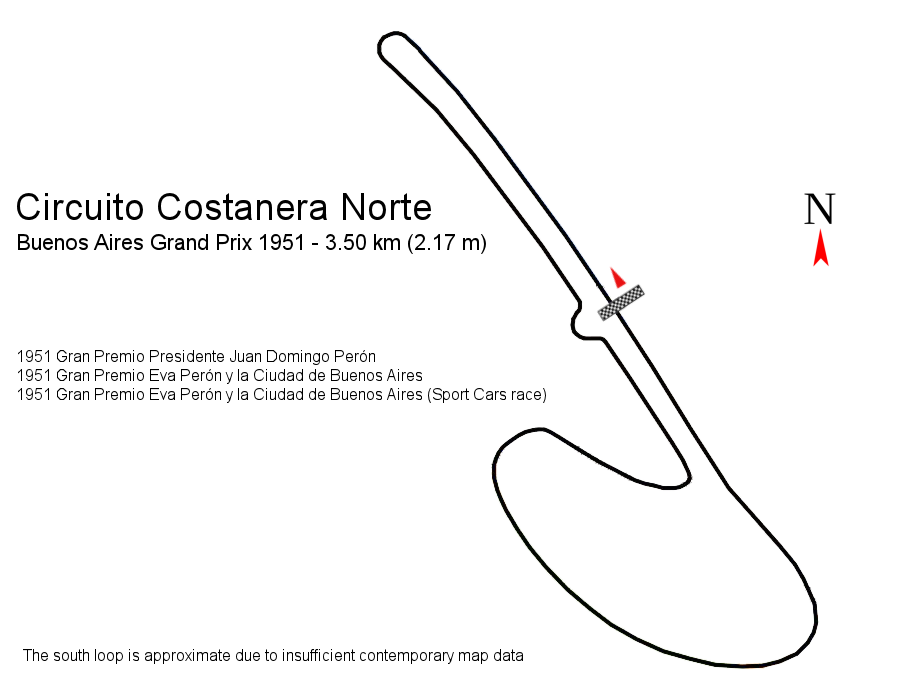

Race details
- Date: February 18, 1951
- Official name: V Gran Premio del General Juan Perón y de la Ciudad de Buenos Aires
- Location: Aeroparque Costanera Buenos Aires
- Course: Public roads
- Course length: 3.50 km (2.17 miles)
- Distance: 45 laps, 157.5 km (90.689 miles)

Pole position
Driver	(Argentina) Juan Manuel Fangio	Mercedes
- Time: 1:58.4 (106.42 km/h / 66.13 m/h)

Fastest lap
Driver	(Argentina) Juan Manuel Fangio	Mercedes
- Time: 2:02.4 (102.94 km/h / 63.96 m/h)

Podium
First	(Argentina) José Froilán González	Ferrari
Second	(Germany) Hermann Lang	Mercedes
Third	(Argentina) Juan Manuel Fangio	Mercedes

The first of three 1951 Buenos Aires Grand Prix (official name: V Gran Premio del General Juan Perón y de la Ciudad de Buenos Aires) was a Formula Libre Grand Prix motor race that took place on February 18, 1951, at the Costanero Norte street circuit in Buenos Aires, Argentina.

== Classification ==
Pos	Driver	Constructor	Laps	Time/Retired
1	(Argentina) José Froilán González	Ferrari 166 FL	45	1:35:18.9
2	(Germany) Hermann Lang	Mercedes-Benz W154	45	1:35:35.3
3	(Argentina) Juan Manuel Fangio	Mercedes-Benz W154	45	1:36:10.4
4	(Argentina) Óscar Alfredo Gálvez	Ferrari 166 FL	44	1:36:25.0
5	(Argentina) Alfredo Pian	Maserati 4CL	44	1:36:55.0
6	(Germany) Karl Kling	Mercedes-Benz W154	44	1:37:27.2
7	(Argentina) Pascual Puópolo	Maserati	43	1:36:08.4
8	(Argentina) Hector Niemitz	Alfa Romeo	42	1:35:19.0
9	(Argentina) Jorge Daponte	Maserati 4CLT	42	1:37:24.8
10	(Argentina) Carlos Menditeguy	Alfa Romeo 8C 308	41	1:36:29.8
11	(Argentina) José Felix Lopes	Simca-Gordini T-15	38	1:36:01.7
12	(Argentina) Clemar Bucci	Alfa Romeo 12C-37	33, DNF	1:11:20.2
Ret	(Argentina) Luis Alberto de Dios	Simca-Gordini T15	8	DNF
Ret	(Argentina) Roberto Miéres	Maserati	2	DNF
Ret	(Argentina) Onofre Marimón	Maserati		DNS
Ret	(Argentina) Alberto Crespo	Maserati		DNS
Ret	(Argentina) Viannini	Maserati 4CL		DNS
Ret	(Argentina) Victorio Rosa	Maserati		DNS
Ret	(Uruguay) Eitel Cantoni	Maserati 4CL		DNS
