= Giordano Aldrighetti =

Italian motorcycle racer and racing driver

- Nationality: (Italy) Italian
- Born: 14 November 1905 Milan, Italy
- Died: 12 August 1939 (aged 33) Pescara, Italy
- Teams: Gilera, Alfa Corse

Giordano "Nando" Aldrighetti (14 November 1905 – 12 August 1939) was an Italian motorcycle racer and racing driver.

Aldrighetti's greatest success in motorcycling came when he won the 1937 Italian Grand Prix riding for the works Gilera team, setting a new lap record of 111 miles per hour (179 km/h) in the process. In 1938, he crashed heavily at the Swiss Grand Prix and was forced to retire from motorcycle racing due to his injuries.

Aldrighetti turned to car racing by joining the Alfa Corse team for 1939. Driving a Tipo 158, he competed in the Tripoli Grand Prix, where he retired. In August, he was entered for the Coppa Acerbo, held at the Pescara Circuit in Italy. He crashed heavily in practice and was thrown out of his burning car; although he appeared to have survived the accident, he died that night from internal injuries.
