= Formula Libre =

Former motor racing class

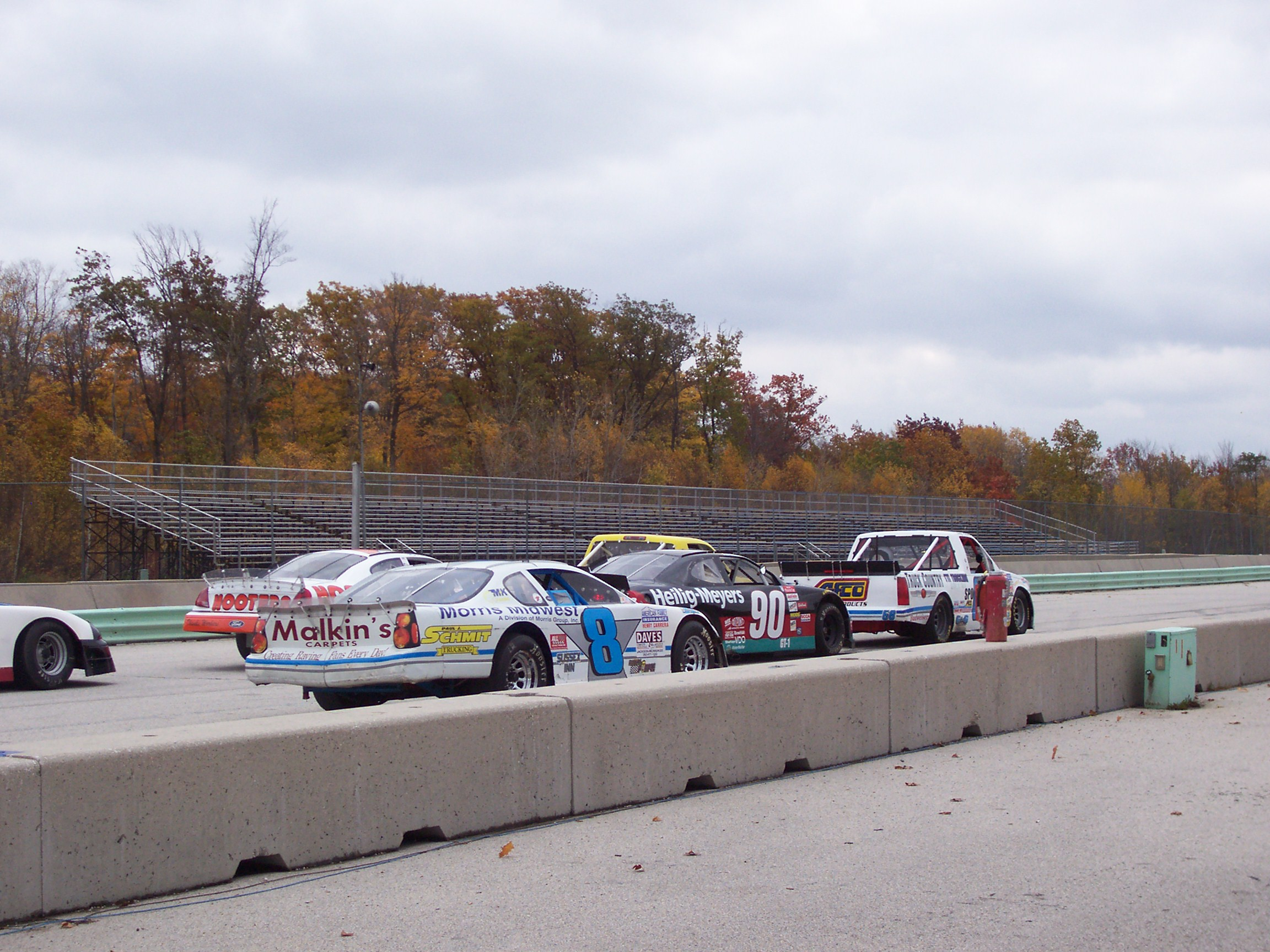
Formula Libre-type field on the starting grid before an exhibition race at Road America. The event featured NASCAR Cup and Truck Series vehicles against local late models and other stock cars.

Formula Libre, also known as Formule Libre, is a form of automobile racing allowing a wide variety of types, ages and makes of purpose-built racing cars to compete "head to head". This can make for some interesting matchups, and provides the opportunity for some compelling driving performances against superior machinery. The name translates to "Free Formula" – in Formula Libre races the only regulations typically govern basics such as safety equipment.

== History ==
In 1932, Louis Chiron won the Nice Grand Prix aboard a Bugatti T51, closely followed just 3.4 seconds behind by Raymond Sommer in an Alfa Romeo Monza with third place going to René Dreyfus, also in a Bugatti T51. In 1933, the race was won by Tazio Nuvolari in a Maserati 8C, followed by René Dreyfus in his Bugatti and Guy Moll in an Alfa Romeo Monza. In 1934, the race was again won by an Italian in an Alfa Romeo Tipo B, none other than the best driver of the season, Achille Varzi. The last season to feature a Grand Prix at Nice was in 1935, when the Alfa Romeo Tipo Bs dominated the circuit in the hands of Tazio Nuvolari and Louis Chiron, who placed second, and René Dreyfus, who took third.

Most recently, the British Open Single Seaters (BOSS) Formula has spawned EuroBOSS and USBOSS equivalents, signalling the re-emergence of Formula Libre events. Racing purists have come to embrace Formula Libre as an alternative to the increasing preponderance of spec racing series, and a number of competitors' vehicles are cars orphaned by discontinued spec series.

Formula Libre has provided some ambitious young drivers with an alternative to series with higher competitive costs and lower performance. Most recently, the UK's British Racing Drivers' Club (BRDC) awarded their Rising Star award to 2004 EuroBOSS Champion Scott Mansell.

The concept is arguably the oldest in motor racing:

- Grand Prix racing adopted Formule Libre briefly, beginning in 1928.
- the 1951 Buenos Aires Grand Prix (I) and 1951 Buenos Aires Grand Prix (II) saw tests of pre-war Mercedes GP cars against post-war Ferrari F1/F2-based FL machinery. Mercedes scored 2nd places and decided to develop for new 1954 rules.
- Formula Libre racing is currently very popular in South Africa.
- Germany's Interserie runs as a Formula Libre, mixing single-seat formula cars with sports racing prototypes.
- The Watkins Glen Grand Prix Race Course hosted a Formula Libre race from 1958 through 1960 as a prelude to becoming the home of the Formula One United States Grand Prix.
- USAC held a famous Formula Libre race at Indianapolis Raceway Park in 1962.
- Formula Libre is a popular class in historic or vintage racing.
- Lime Rock Park held a famous Formula Libre race in 1959, where Rodger Ward shocked the expensive and exotic sports cars by beating them on the road course in an Offenhauser powered midget car, normally considered competitive for oval tracks only.
- The 1971 Questor Grand Prix was a well-attended inter-series race between Formula One and Formula 5000 teams, featuring top drivers at California's Ontario Motor Speedway.
- The August 1972 Rothmans 50000 race permitted almost any kind of single-seater or sports-racer in a 300-mile (480 km) race at Brands Hatch, competing for a £50,000 prize fund (considerably more than most Grands Prix of the day, £597,440 or €680,330 in 2025 where F1 GP Hosting Fees from $20M to over $50M are paid). Most of the grid consisted of Formula One and Formula 5000 cars, with some Formula Two machinery, sports cars and the odd, more exotic vehicle.
- Formula Libre races usually closed the programme at British club meetings in the 1970s, allowing not only cars that didn't suit any of the classes racing that day to run but also giving drivers of formula cars another chance to race.
