= Bridgehampton Race Circuit =

Race track in the United States

Bridge
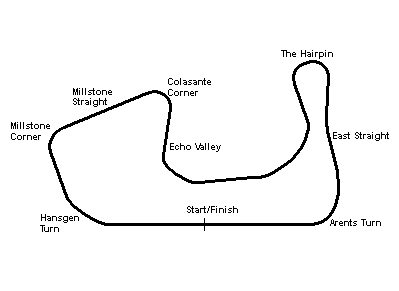
- Road Course (1957–1999)

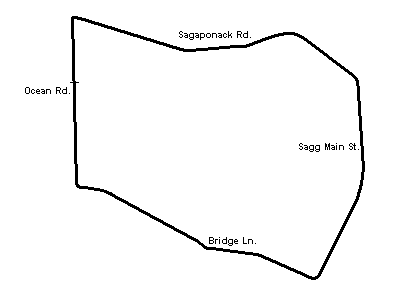
- Street Circuit (1949–1953)
- Location: Sag Harbor, New York, United States
- Coordinates: 40°58′48″N 72°20′28″W
- Opened: 1949 (as street circuit); 1957 (as road course)
- Closed: 1949 (as street circuit); 1999 (as road course)
- Major events: Bridgehampton Sports Car Races (1949–1953, 1957–1968, 1971); Bridgehampton Grand Prix (1961–1969); Trans-Am Series (1968–1970); Vanderbilt Cup (1965, 1967–1968); SCCA Grand Prix Championship (1967); NASCAR Grand National Series (1958, 1963–1964, 1966)

Road Course (1957–1999)
- Length: 2.850 mi (4.586 km)
- Turns: 13
- Race lap record: 1:26.640 ( (New Zealand) Denny Hulme, McLaren M8B, 1969, Group 7)

Street Circuit (1949–1953)
- Length: 4.000 mi (6.437 km)
- Turns: 11
- Race lap record: 2:52.000 ( (United States) Tom Cole, Allard J2, 1951, Sports car)

Bridgehampton Race Circuit was a race track located near Sag Harbor, New York, United States. The circuit opened in 1957, following a series of road races held from 1949 until 1953. It was one of the first permanent road racing venues in the United States, opening after Thompson Speedway, two years after Road America, the year after Watkins Glen International, and the same year as Lime Rock Park and Laguna Seca Raceway. In its early years, Bridgehampton was host to major international series, including the World Sportscar Championship, Can-Am, and NASCAR Grand National. By the early 1970s, the track was used mostly for amateur events. The track closed permanently in 1999.

Bridgehampton was renowned as a fearsome course, requiring the utmost of driver skill.

== History ==
=== Early road races ===
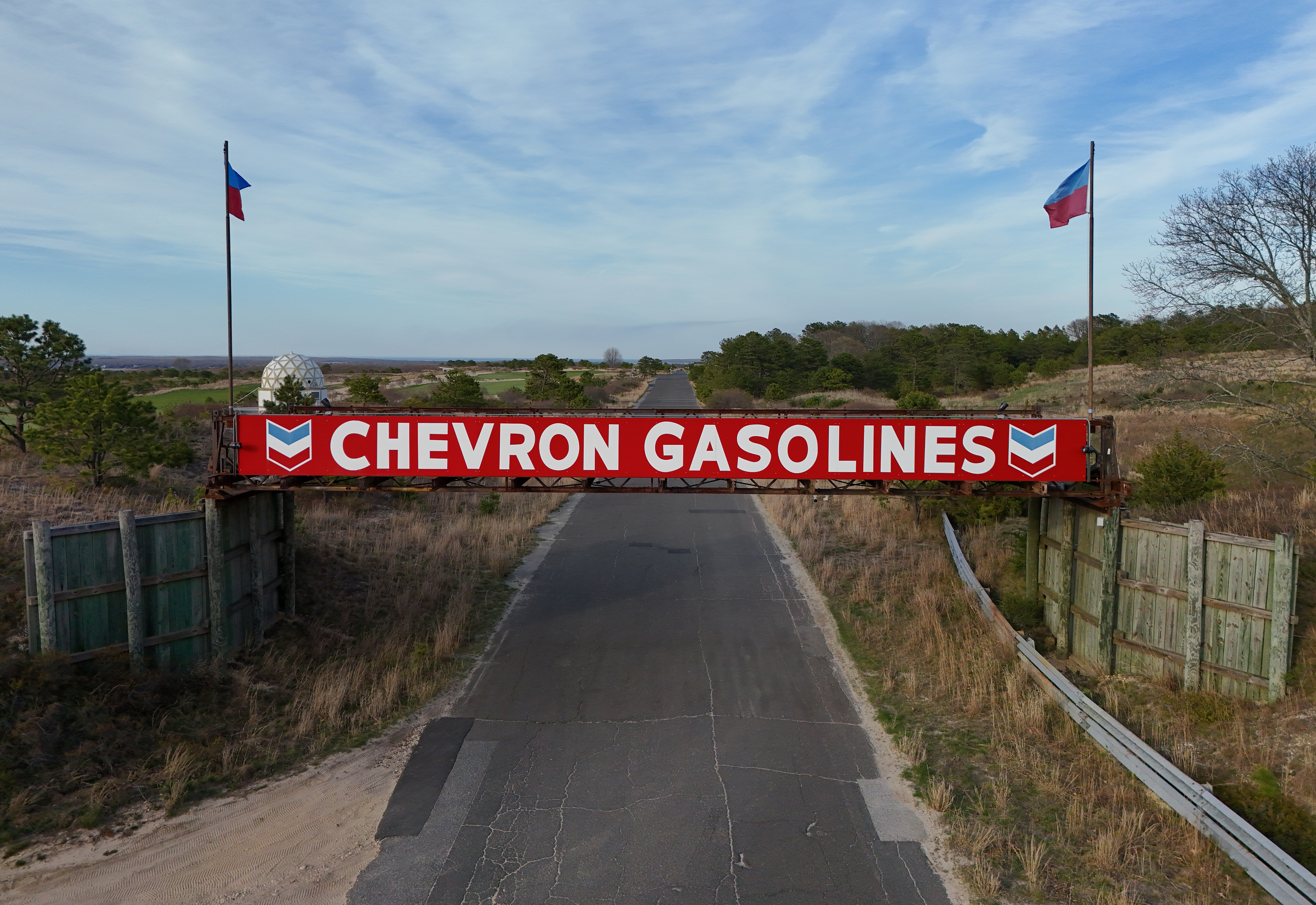
Pedestrian bridge still standing today

The first road races in Bridgehampton were held on public roads around the hamlet of Bridgehampton from 1915 until 1921. The course ran counterclockwise on an approximately 3.000 km (1.864 mi) rectangle, beginning on Montauk Highway, then turning left onto Halsey Lane, left onto Pauls Lane, left onto Ocean Boulevard, and left back onto Montauk Highway.

The races were revived in 1949, utilizing a 4.000 km (2.485 mi) circuit adjacent to the pre-war circuit in Bridgehampton and Sagaponack. It ran clockwise beginning on Ocean Road, turning right onto Sagaponack Road, right onto Sagaponack Main Street, right onto Bridge Lane, and right back onto Ocean Road. The races proved successful, and joined the SCCA National Sports Car Championship when it was created in 1951. The road races came to an end in 1953, after a driver was killed in practice and three spectators injured during the race. These events, combined with a spectator death in a crash at Watkins Glen in 1952, led the State of New York to ban racing on public roads.

=== Permanent circuit ===
Local racing enthusiasts formed the Bridgehampton Road Races Corporation in 1953 to finance the construction of a permanent race circuit in the area. The corporation purchased a 550-acre (2.2 km^{2}) parcel known as Noyack Hills in 1956, and constructed a 2.850 mi (4.587 km), 13-turn road course. Although construction was not completed, the first races were held in 1957. The headline event, the Bridgehampton Sports Car Races, were a part of the SCCA National Championship; Regional races would be added in 1958. The race would shift to the professional United States Road Racing Championship in 1965, and resurrected the Vanderbilt Cup, which had been run on Long Island from 1904 until 1910. A second National event was added in 1961. This event would shift to the World Sportscar Championship for 1962, marking Bridgehampton's biggest event. The WSC gave way to Can-Am from 1966 until 1969. Can-Am was scheduled to return in 1970, but the race was moved to the newly opened Road Atlanta after heavy storms damaged the track. A 1971 IMSA GT Championship event was the last major event at the track.

=== Decline and demise ===
Bridgehampton's included a small media and scoring building and a small grandstand. The Bridgehampton Road Races Corporation did not have the money to upgrade and maintain the tracks infrastructure to world-class standards. The track's land had appreciated to several million dollars in a few decades. Locals began complaining about noise in the mid-1970s, and in 1983 the town passed an ordinance limiting noise and effectively ending any chance of big-league racing returning. Plans were announced in 1994 to turn the property into a golf course. Races continued until 1997, and a racing school and club meets lingered until 1998. A portion of the course, including the Chevron Bridge, are preserved on the grounds of the golf course.

== Events ==
- Can-Am
  - Bridgehampton Grand Prix (1966–1969)
- Formula Atlantic (1979–1980)
- IMSA GT Championship
  - Bridgehampton Sports Car Races (1971)
- NASCAR Grand National Series (1958, 1963–1964, 1966)
- SCCA Grand Prix Championship (1967)
- SCCA National Sports Car Championship
  - Bridgehampton Sports Car Races (1952–1953, 1957–1964)
- Trans-Am Series (1968–1970)
- United States Road Racing Championship
  - Bridgehampton Sports Car Races (1965–1968)
- Vanderbilt Cup (1965, 1967–1968)
- World Sportscar Championship
  - Bridgehampton Grand Prix (1962–1965)

== NASCAR Grand National results ==
Year	Date	Driver	Car Make	Winner's prize (USD)	Distance Laps/Miles (km)	Average Speed (mph)	Race Time
1958	August 2	(Georgia (U.S. state)) Jack Smith	Chevrolet	$800	35 / 99.8 (160.6)	80.696	1:14:10
1963	July 21	(North Carolina) Richard Petty	Plymouth	$1,000	35 / 99.8 (160.6)	86.047	1:09:04
1964	July 12	(Texas) Billy Wade	Mercury	$1,225	50 / 142.5 (229.3)	87.707	1:37:29
1966	July 10	(South Carolina) David Pearson	Dodge	$1,375	52 / 148.2 (238.5)	86.949	1:42:16

== Trans-Am results ==
Year	Winner	Entrant	Car
1968	(United States) Mark Donohue	Penske-Hilton Racing	Chevrolet Camaro Z28
1969	(United States) George Follmer	Bud Moore Engineering	Ford Mustang Boss 302
1970	(United States) Mark Donohue	Penske Racing	AMC Javelin

== Lap records ==
The fastest official race lap records at Bridgehampton Race Circuit are listed as:

Category	Time	Driver	Vehicle	Event
Permanent Road Course: 2.850 mi (4.586 km) (1957–1999)
Group 7 (Can-Am)	1:26.640	Denny Hulme	McLaren M8B	1969 Inver House Can-Am Bridgehampton
Formula Atlantic	1:27.733	Jeff Wood	March 79B	1979 Bridgehampton Formula Atlantic round
Group 4	1:34.000	Mark Donohue	Lola T70 Mk.II	1967 Bridgehampton 200
Trans-Am	1:42.400	Swede Savage (Note: All drivers took the same lap record independently.); Bert Everett; Hans Ziereis	Plymouth Barracuda; Alfa Romeo GTA; BMW 2002	1970 Bridgehampton Trans-Am round
Group 3	1:49.000	Dan Gurney	Shelby Cobra	1963 Bridgehampton Double 500
Street Circuit: 4.000 mi (6.437 km) (1949–1953)
Sports car	2:52.000	Tom Cole	Allard J2	1951 Bridgehampton Sports Car Road Races
