= Bridgehampton Sports Car Races =

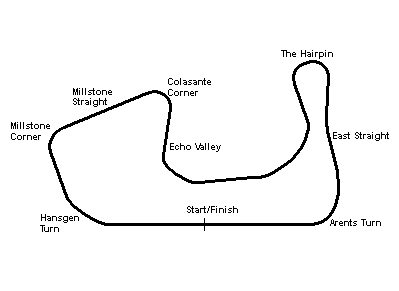
- Venue: Bridgehampton Race Circuit
- First race: 1949
- Last race: 1971
- Most wins (driver): Walt Hansgen (7)
- Most wins (team): Briggs Cunningham (7)
- Most wins (manufacturer): Ferrari (3); Lola (3)

The Bridgehampton Sports Car Races was a sports car race held at Bridgehampton Race Circuit between 1949 and 1971.

== History ==
The first road races in Bridgehampton were held on public roads around the hamlet of Bridgehampton from 1915 until 1921. The course ran counterclockwise on an approximately 3-mile (4.8-km) rectangle, beginning on Montauk Highway, then turning left onto Halsey Lane, left onto Pauls Lane, left onto Ocean Boulevard, and left back onto Montauk Highway.

The races were revived in 1949, utilizing a 4-mile (6.4-km) circuit adjacent to the pre-war circuit in Bridgehampton and Sagaponack. It ran clockwise beginning on Ocean Road, turning right onto Sagaponack Road, right onto Sagaponack Main Street, right onto Bridge Lane, and right back onto Ocean Road. George Huntoon won the inaugural race in an Alfa Romeo 8C. The races proved successful, and joined the SCCA National Sports Car Championship in 1952. The road races came to an end in 1953, after a driver was killed in practice and three spectators injured during the race. These events, combined with a spectator death in a crash at Watkins Glen in 1952, led the State of New York to ban racing on public roads.

Local racing enthusiasts formed the Bridgehampton Road Races Corporation in 1953 to finance the construction of a permanent race circuit in the area. The corporation purchased a 550-acre (2.2 km^{2}) parcel known as Noyack Hills in 1956, and constructed a 2.85-mile (4.59 km), 13-turn road course. Although construction was not completed, the first races were held in 1957. Walt Hansgen, driving for Briggs Cunningham, dominated the National Championship races at Bridgehampton, winning the first 7 on the new permanent course. In 1965, the race switched to the SCCA's professional United States Road Racing Championship. The switch also brought the Vanderbilt Cup trophy to the race, resurrecting the race that had run on Long Island from 1904–1910 and 1936–1937. The race did not continue when the USRRC was discontinued, but was revived as a 3-hour IMSA GT Championship race in 1971. This was the last major race held at Bridgehampton before the track's demise in 1998.

== Results ==
=== Road course ===
Year	Overall winner(s)	Entrant	Car	Distance/Duration	Race title	Report
Non-championship
1949	(United States) George Huntoon	Samuel Bird	Alfa Romeo 8C 2600 s/c	100 mi (160 km)	Bridgehampton Sports Car Road Races	report
1950	(United States) Tom Cole		Allard J2-Cadillac	80 mi (130 km)	Bridgehampton Sports Car Road Races	report
1951	(United States) Tom Cole		Allard-Chrysler	100 mi (160 km)	Bridgehampton Sports Car Road Races	report
SCCA National Sports Car Championship
1952	(United States) Bill Spear	Bill Spear	Ferrari 340 America	100 mi (160 km)	Bridgehampton Sports Car Road Races	report
1953	(United States) Bill Spear^{A}	Bill Spear	Ferrari 340 Mexico	100 mi (160 km)	Bridgehampton Sports Car Races	report

^A Spear was leading when the race was stopped

=== Bridghampton Raceway ===
Year	Overall winner(s)	Entrant	Car	Distance/Duration	Race title	Report
SCCA National Sports Car Championship
1957	(United States) Walt Hansgen	Briggs Cunningham	Jaguar D-Type	75 mi (121 km)	Bridgehampton Inaugural Races	report
1958	(United States) Walt Hansgen	Briggs Cunningham	Lister-Jaguar	75 mi (121 km)		report
1959	(United States) Walt Hansgen	Briggs Cunningham	Lister-Jaguar	75 mi (121 km)	Bridgehampton Road Race Course Sports Car Races	report
1960	(United States) Walt Hansgen	Briggs Cunningham	Maserati Tipo 61	50 mi (80 km)		report
1961	(United States) Walt Hansgen	Briggs Cunningham	Maserati Tipo 61	70 mi (110 km)	Bridgehampton National Event	report
1962	(United States) Walt Hansgen	Briggs Cunningham	Cooper Monaco T61-Buick	70 mi (110 km)		report
1963	(United States) Walt Hansgen	Briggs Cunningham	Cooper Monaco T61-Buick	91 mi (146 km)		report
1964	(United States) Tom O'Brien		Ferrari 268 SP			report
United States Road Racing Championship
1965	(United States) Jim Hall	Chaparral Cars	Chaparral 2A-Chevrolet	214 mi (344 km)	Vanderbilt Cup	report
1966	(United States) Jerry Grant	All American Racers	Lola T70-Ford	200 mi (320 km)	Bridgehampton 200	report
1967	(United States) Mark Donohue	Roger Penske	Lola T70 Mk.3-Chevrolet	200 mi (320 km)	Vanderbilt Cup	report
1968	(United States) Skip Scott	Carl Haas	Lola T70 Mk.3-Chevrolet	171 mi (275 km)	Vanderbilt Cup	report
1969–1970: Not held
IMSA GT Championship
1971	(United States) Peter Gregg (United States) Hurley Haywood	Brumos Porsche Audi Corp.	Porsche 914/6	3 hours	3-Hour Bridgehampton	report

== See also ==
- Bridgehampton Grand Prix
