= 1951 Buenos Aires Grand Prix (III) =

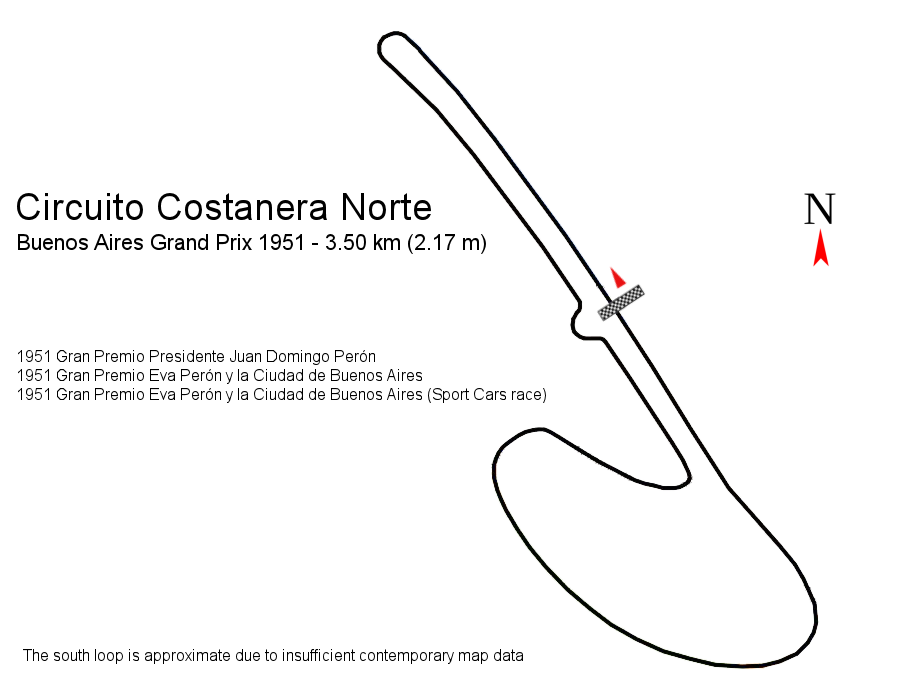

Race details
- Date: March 18, 1951
- Official name: Gran Premio de Eva Duarte Perón (Sport)
- Location: Aeroparque Costanera Buenos Aires
- Course: Public roads
- Course length: 3.50 km (2.17 miles)
- Distance: 40 laps, 140.01 km (86.99 miles)

Pole position
Driver	(United States) Tom Cole	USA
- Time: 2:18.50 (94.7 km/h / 56.53 m/h)

Fastest lap
Driver	(United States) John Fitch	Allard J2-Cadillac
- Time: 2:13.5 (92.99 km/h / 57.78 m/h)

Podium
First	(United States) John Fitch	Allard J2-Cadillac
Second	(United States) Fred Wacker	Allard J2-Cadillac
Third	(Argentina) Miguel Schroeder	Delahaye Le Mans

The third of three 1951 Buenos Aires Grand Prix (official name: Gran Premio de Eva Duarte Perón - Sport) was a Sports Car Grand Prix motor race (over 1500cc S+1.5) that took place on March 18, 1951, at the Costanero Norte circuit in Buenos Aires, Argentina. The race was also known as the "Buenos Aires National" and was part of the Argentine Nationals racing series.

Results from the 1951 Buenos Aires Grand Prix for Sports Cars:

== Classification ==
Pos	Driver	Constructor	Laps	Time/Retired
1	(United States) John Fitch	Allard J2-Cadillac	40	1:33:35.8
2	(United States) Fred Wacker	Allard J2-Cadillac	39	1:34:52.5
3	(Argentina) Miguel Schroeder	Delahaye Le Mans	38	1:34:20.4
4	(Argentina) José M. Collazo	Healey Silverstone Riley	38	
5	(Argentina) Adolfo Schwelm Cruz	Alfa Romeo 8C 2300	38	
6	(United States) George Rand	Ferrari 166 Inter	37	
7	(United States) Jim Kimberly	Ferrari 195 S Berlinetta	37	
8	(United States) William Spear	Ferrari 166 MM	37	
9	(Argentina) Jorge Camaño	Jaguar XK120	37	
10	(Argentina) Roberto Bonomi	Cisitalia 1.2	36	
11	(United States) Hal Ullrich	Wayne-Nardi Alfa	36	
12	(Argentina) Lucio Bollaert	Jaguar XK120	36	
13	(Argentina) Carlos Stabile	Healey Silverstone	36	
14	(Argentina) Carlos Lostalo	Jaguar XK120	36	
15	(Argentina) Nicolas Dellepiane	Lea Francis	36	
16	(Argentina) Cesar Tesoriero	Jaguar XK120	35	
17	(Argentina) Eric Forrest Greene	Bentley 4 1/4	34	
18	(Argentina) "Paquito"	Alfa Romeo	33	
19	(Argentina) Francisco Ridder	Jaguar XK120	31	
20	(Argentina) Eduardo Harrington	BMW	26	
DNF	(Argentina) Jose Dellepiane		19	
DNF	(Argentina) Roberto Mieres	Jaguar XK120	17	
DNF	(Argentina) Carlos Pérez de Villa	Alfa Romeo 2.9	10	
DNF	(United States) Tom Cole	Allard J2-Chrysler	7	
