= Pierre Boncompagni =

French racing driver (1913–1953)

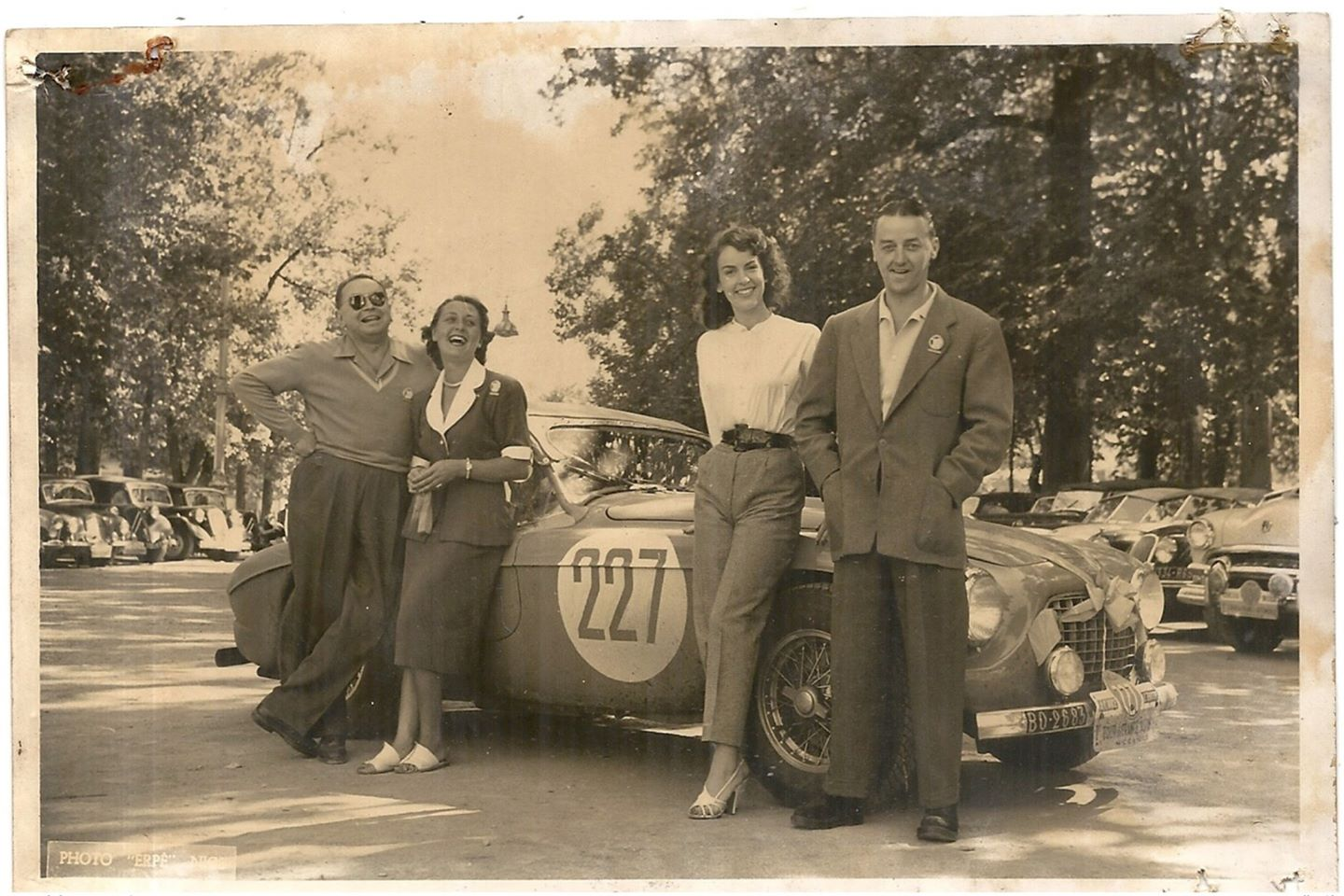
- Boncompagni (far left) and Alfred Barraquet (far right) at the 1951 Tour de France Automobile.
- Born: 19 May 1913; Nice, France
- Died: 7 June 1953 (aged 40); Hyères, France

Pierre "Pagnibon" Boncompagni (19 May 1913 – 7 June 1953) was a French racing driver, best remembered for winning the 1951 Tour de France Automobile.

== Career ==
=== Early races ===
In 1947, Boncompagni took part in the Circuito di Pescara in a Stanguellini 1100 but retired. In 1949, he finished second in a race for cars over 2000cc in Nice and was second in class in a hillclimb at Mt. Ventoux. Although his biggest successes would be in sportscars, he also drove a DB in some 500cc Formula Three races: in 1950 he retired from a race at Montlhéry, and in 1951 he raced at Draguignan, finishing runner-up in the second heat.

=== 1950 ===
In 1950, he purchased a Talbot-Lago T150C SS, chassis number 90120, and would drive it under the entry Ecurie Nice to considerable success over the next two years. He returned to the event in Nice, driving a Cisitalia to second in the 1100cc race and winning the race for cars over three litres in the Talbot-Lago. Later that year, he finished fourth in the Coupes du Salon at Montlhéry.

=== 1951 ===
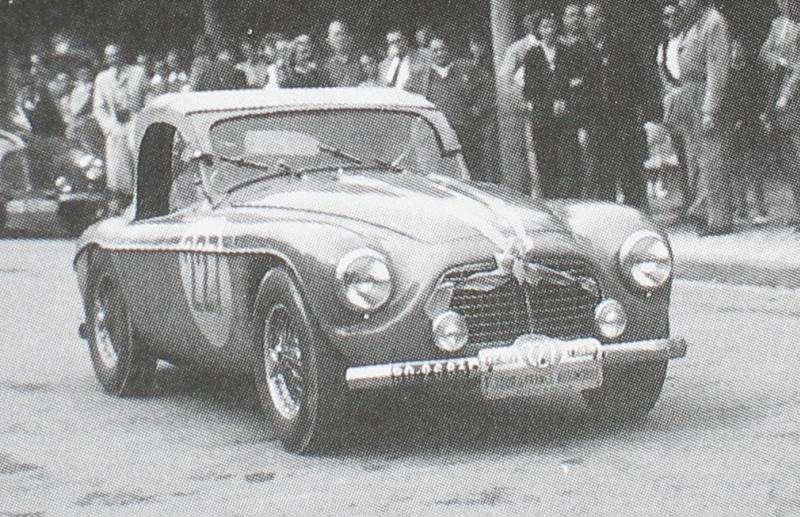
Boncompagni and Alfred Barraquet on the way to victory in the 1951 Tour de France Automobile.

1951 saw Boncompagni's sportscar career gain strong momentum. The year began at the Agadir Grand Prix, where he won the S1.1 and S1.5 races in his Cisitalia and the S+3.0 race in his Talbot-Lago. He repeated his victory at Nice in the Talbot-Lago, and took a further three wins in the Circuit d'Orléans, the Circuit de Bressuire and at Agen. He also won hillclimb events at Mt. Ventoux and Draguignan. He came within minutes of winning the 12 Hours of Hyères, only for mechanical failure to strike within touching distance of the finish.

The same year, the Automobile Club de Nice reinstated the Tour de France Automobile, one of the world's oldest motorsport events. The road rally was to be held over six stages and 5,239 km (3,255 mi). Boncompagni hired a Ferrari 212 Export (serial number 0078E) from Luigi Chinetti and won the first edition of this revived event alongside navigator Alfred Barraquet. It would rank among his most famous victories. Chinetti later exported the car to the United States in order to support his young protégé Phil Hill in club racing events.

=== 1952 ===
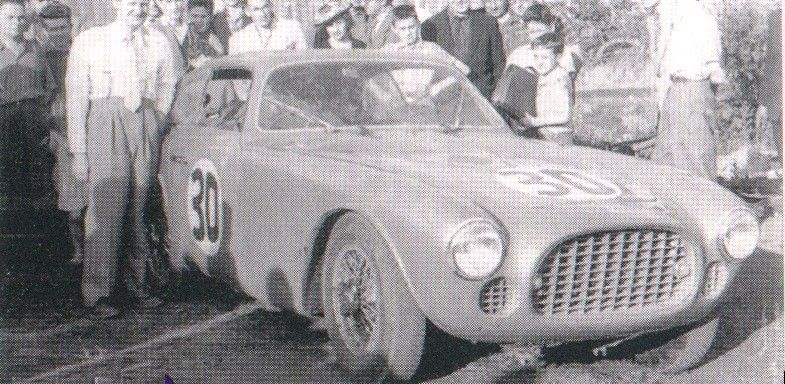
The Ferrari 225 S raced by Boncompagni (not in picture) and Tom Cole (left) in the 1952 24 Hours of Le Mans.

In 1952, Boncompagni returned to the Agadir Grand Prix and won the S+2.0 race in his Talbot-Lago. He then entered several races in a Ferrari 212 Export purchased from Chinetti, serial number 0141T. At Montlhéry, he placed second in the Coupes de Vitesse and won the supporting race for production cars. He finished first in class at the Circuit de Nîmes, won the Course de côte du Val de Cuech (a hillclimb in Salon-de-Provence), and was third in class in the hillclimb at Mt. Ventoux. He returned to Montlhéry for the Spring Cup, where he won the production race and finished second in the Formula Libre race. In his final outing in the car, he won the S3.0 race at Bordeaux.

For the remainder of the season, Boncompagni loaned a Ferrari 225 S, serial number 0152EL. He drove it to fifth in the Monaco Grand Prix, held that year as a sportscar race. His success that season had caught the attention of Enzo Ferrari, who offered Boncompagni an entry to the 24 Hours of Le Mans under the official Scuderia Ferrari banner. He entered his car to the race with Tom Cole as a second driver, but retired with electrical issues. He entered the Grand Prix of Reims but retired with rear axle failure. He returned to the Tour de France with navigator Adolfo Macchieraldo and finished second overall. He raced in the Autumn cup at Montlhéry but did not finish, won his class and placed second overall at Agen, and round out the year with a class victory in the production car race at the Coupes du Salon.

=== 1953 ===
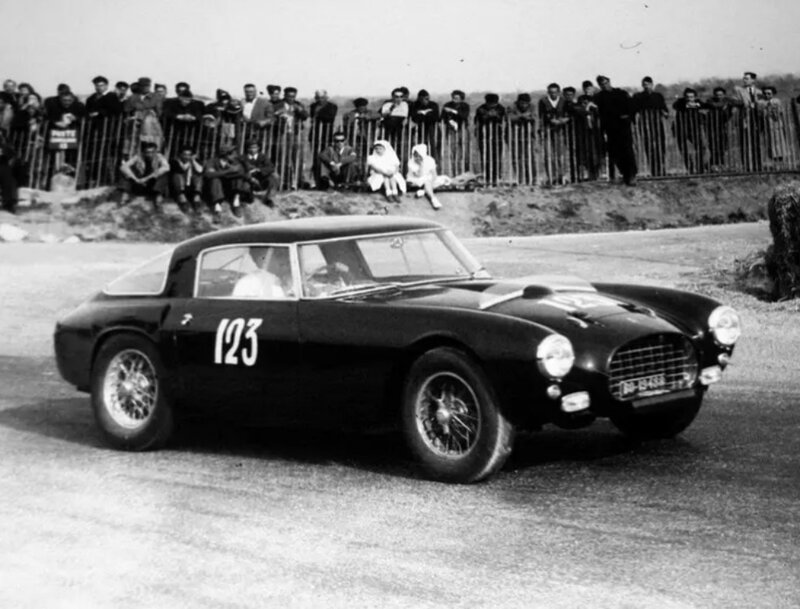
Boncompagni in his Ferrari 340 MM s/n 0236MM at Nimes on 29 March 1953, ending in second place

In 1953, Boncompagni purchased a Ferrari 340 MM, serial number 0236MM. He took it to the Agadir Grand Prix where he finished second in the S+2.0 race, and to the Circuit de Nîmes where he finished second in the S+1.5 race. In this car, Boncompagni won the Rallye Soleil-Cannes, an eight-day road rally across France. He drove it to second in the Coupes de Vitesse, and won the 3 Hours of Algeria under the Ecurie Côte d'Azur banner.

Boncompagni purchased a 340 MM Touring Spyder, serial number 0268AM, and drove it to victory in the Spring Cup at Montlhéry.

=== Death at Hyères ===
Boncompagni took his 340 MM Touring Spyder to the 12 Hours of Hyères on 7 June 1953. The race began at 6 a.m. and was held in pouring rain. Boncompagni was leading and had just set the fastest lap, which would stand until the end of the race. On the 34th lap, shortly before 8 a.m., he lost control of his car at a high-speed bend near the hippodrome on the easternmost part of the street circuit. The car hit a telegraph pole and overturned, fatally injuring him. A one-minute silence was held after the race's conclusion in remembrance of Boncompagni and of Jean Heurtaux, the winner of the 1952 edition who had been killed four weeks earlier in a hillclimb near Saint-Étienne. A monument was installed near the scene of his accident, situated on the D197 at the northwest corner of the Hippodrome du Var.

Prior to his fatal accident, Boncompagni had been entered for the 24 Hours of Le Mans in a Talbot-Lago T26 GS.

== Personal ==
Boncompagni raced under the nom de course "Pagnibon", a slight modification of his surname. It has been suggested that the surname Boncompagni was notorious in France after he had acted as a collaborationist during the Second World War, which led him to avoid using it for his racing exploits. His family hailed from Italy and his wife was from Turin. He operated a mechanics business in Alpes-Maritimes with help from Alfred Barraquet, his navigator in the 1951 Tour de France.

== Racing record ==
=== Complete 24 Hours of Le Mans results ===
Year	Team	Co-Drivers	Car	Class	Laps	Pos.	Class Pos.
1952	(Italy) Scuderia Ferrari	(United States) Tom Cole	Ferrari 225 S Berlinetta	S3.0	-	DNF (Electrics)	

=== Complete Tour de France Automobile results ===
Year	Team	Co-Drivers	Car	Class	Pos.	Class Pos.
1951		(France) Alfred Barraquet	Ferrari 212 Export		1st	1st
1952	(France) "Pagnibon" (private entrant)	(Italy) Adolfo Macchieraldo	Ferrari 225 S Vignale Berlinetta		2nd	2nd
