= Bridgehampton Grand Prix =

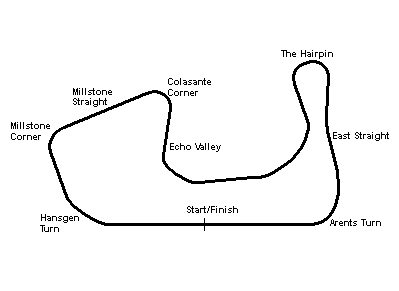
- Venue: Bridgehampton Race Circuit
- First race: 1961
- Last race: 1969
- Previous names: Bridgehampton Double 500
- Most wins (driver): Walt Hansgen (2); Dan Gurney (2); Denny Hulme (2)
- Most wins (team): McLaren Cars, Ltd. (2)
- Most wins (manufacturer): McLaren (3)

The Bridgehampton Grand Prix was a sports car race held at Bridgehampton Race Circuit between 1961 and 1969.

== Results ==
Year	Overall winner(s)	Entrant	Car	Distance/Duration	Race title	Report
SCCA National Sports Car Championship
1961	(United States) Walt Hansgen	Briggs Cunningham	Maserati Tipo 63	71.3 mi (114.7 km)	Bridgehampton National Races	report
World Sportscar Championship
1962	(Mexico) Pedro Rodríguez	North American Racing Team	Ferrari 330 TRI/LM	400 km (250 mi)	Bridgehampton Double 400	report
1963	(United States) Dan Gurney	John Edgar	Shelby Cobra	500 km (310 mi)	Bridgehampton Double 500	report
1964	(United States) Walt Hansgen^{A}	Mecom Racing Team	Scarab Mk IV-Chevrolet	500 km (310 mi)	Bridgehampton Double 500	report
1965	(United States) Hap Sharp	Chaparral Cars	Chaparral 2A-Chevrolet	500 km (310 mi)	Bridgehampton Double 500	report
Can-Am Challenge Cup
1966	(United States) Dan Gurney	All American Racers	Lola T70 Mk.2-Ford	200 mi (320 km)	Bridgehampton Grand Prix	report
1967	(New Zealand) Denny Hulme	McLaren Cars Ltd.	McLaren M6A-Chevrolet	200 mi (320 km)	Chevron Grand Prix	report
1968	(United States) Mark Donohue	Roger Penske Racing Enterprises	McLaren M6B-Chevrolet	200 mi (320 km)	Bridgehampton Grand Prix	report
1969	(New Zealand) Denny Hulme	McLaren Cars Ltd.	McLaren M8B-Chevrolet	200 mi (320 km)	Inver House Scotch Grand Prix	report

^A In 1964, only GT cars counted towards the World Sportscar Championship; the top GT finisher was Ken Miles in a Shelby Cobra.

== See also ==
- Bridgehampton Sports Car Races
