= 1952 24 Hours of Le Mans =

20th 24 Hours of Le Mans endurance race

Previous: 1951	Next: 1953
Index: Races | Winners

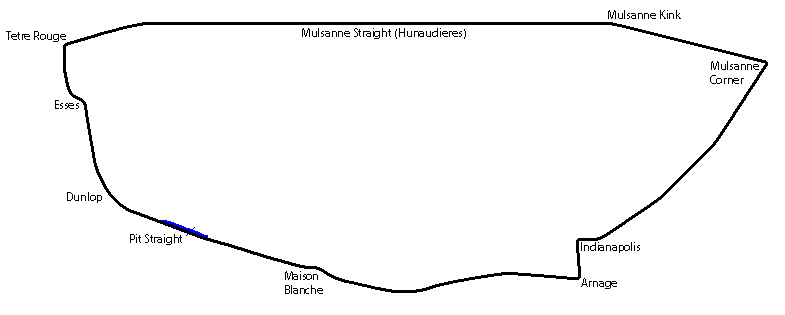
Le Mans in 1952

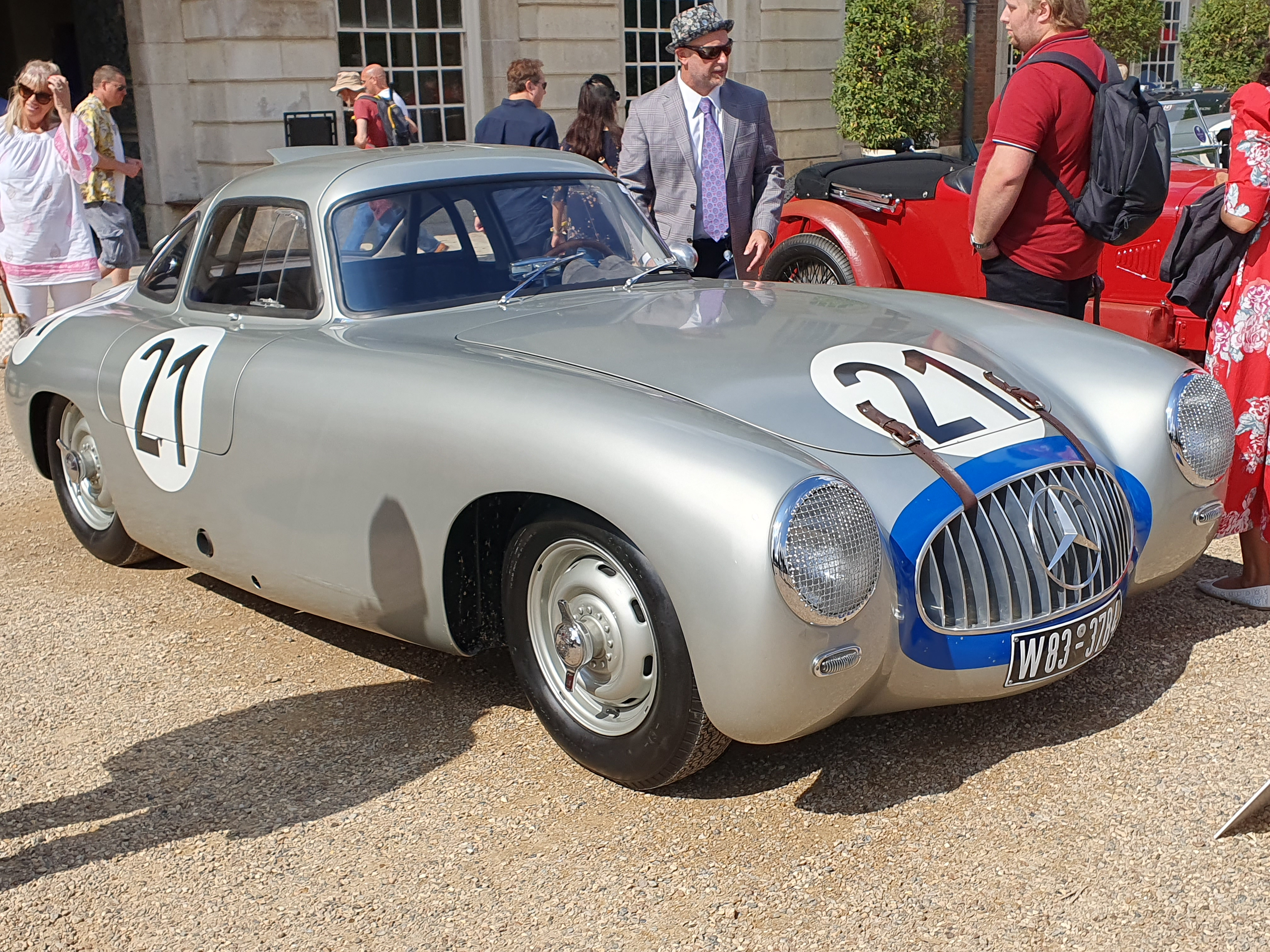
The winning Mercedes 300SL W194 No. 21 in 2023. The doors, previously just gullwing windows, had to be enlarged for the 24 race

The 1952 24 Hours of Le Mans was the 20th Grand Prix of Endurance, and took place on 14–15 June 1952 at Circuit de la Sarthe.

After 22 years away, Mercedes-Benz returned in triumph, scoring a 1–2 victory with their new gull-wing Mercedes-Benz W194 which was equipped with a 3.0L S6 engine that had less power than the road car sold two years later.

Aston Martin, with their DB3, joined Ferrari, Jaguar, Mercedes-Benz, and Cunningham in the top-level sports prototype game, setting the stage for the rivalries that provided so much drama during the rest of the decade.

This race was notable in that Pierre Levegh attempted to drive the entire 24 Hours by himself. With just over an hour to go however, a connecting rod in the engine of Levegh's car broke, taking it out of the race.

== Regulations ==
This year the Automobile Club de l'Ouest (ACO) decreed that mudguards now had to be integral with the bodywork, unlike the pre-war style of cycle-type mudguards. This meant cars had proper sports-car bodies and were not just modified Grand Prix cars. After ongoing issues with the fuel used in the race, the ACO's ‘ternary' fuel was made up of 75% petrol, 15% alcohol and 10% benzole. The minimum replenishment period for fuel, water and oil was extended from 25 laps to 28. The target average lap speeds (i.e. minimum distances per hour) for each class were also increased. Finally, after 19 runs of the event, the prize money (FF 1 500 000) for the race-winner was raised to make it the same as that for the Index of Performance winner – just reflecting the stature that the teams and spectators had always placed on the overall race win.

== Entries ==
There were over a dozen multi-car works teams that year, along with self-built team owners and works-supported private entries. There were less than 20 genuine private entries, well in the minority of the 60 starters and reserves. This year the big news was the return of Mercedes-Benz and Rudolf Caracciola to La Sarthe after 22 years, and the first entry from the Scuderia Ferrari works team.

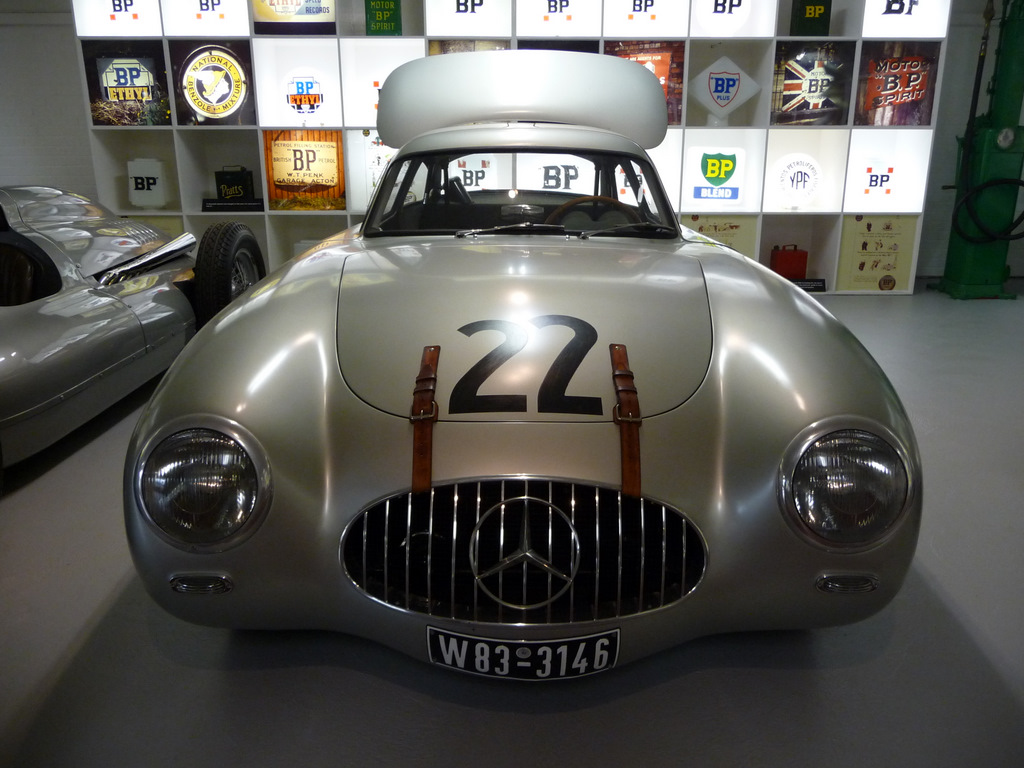
Mercedes 300SL W194 No. 22 with air brake applied. It was not allowed in the race.

Mercedes, led again by their pre-war team manager Alfred Neubauer, arrived with a trio of Mercedes-Benz W194 sportscars named '300SL' (Sport Leicht), which would lead to the road-going fuel-injected 1954 Mercedes-Benz W198 Gullwing of the same name. To fit into a low racer, the 3.0L S6 engine of a new limousine was tilted at a 50° angle, and race-tuned as Mercedes-Benz M194 engine, still fitted with carburettors. The cars had tubular frames with high sides, and in the first two races, Mille Miglia and supporting the 1952 Swiss Grand Prix, had only small gullwing windows above the closed sides. These were considered too small by the ACO organizers, thus new chassis had to be made, with doors that cut halfway into the sides. Mercedes also tested tilted air brakes above the roof, these were not allowed to race. The cars had run for over 12 hour at the Mille Miglia, and were tuned down a fraction to 165 bhp for better 24 hour durability.

Along with Neubauer was only one of three pre-war Mercedes team drivers, Hermann Lang. Rudolf Caracciola was entered on the No.22T car, but in May had broken his leg in Switzerland, and this ended his illustrious career. Even worse happened to Luigi Fagioli who had won the 1935 Monaco Grand Prix for Mercedes, but got injured before the recent 1952 Monaco Grand Prix sports car race, and would die after the Le Mans race. Karl Kling was the other post-war team leader, with a third car given to lesser known drivers.

Jaguar returned with a strong 3-car team. Having been beaten for speed by the new Ferrari and Mercedes-Benz in the Mille Miglia, the C-types were hurriedly redesigned with a more aerodynamic shell, which unfortunately meant a smaller radiator and a relocated header tank. They also presented a strong driver line-up with the previous year's winners Peter Walker with Stirling Moss, and Peter Whitehead with new driver Ian Stewart, as well as Tony Rolt and Duncan Hamilton who had previously driven for Healey.

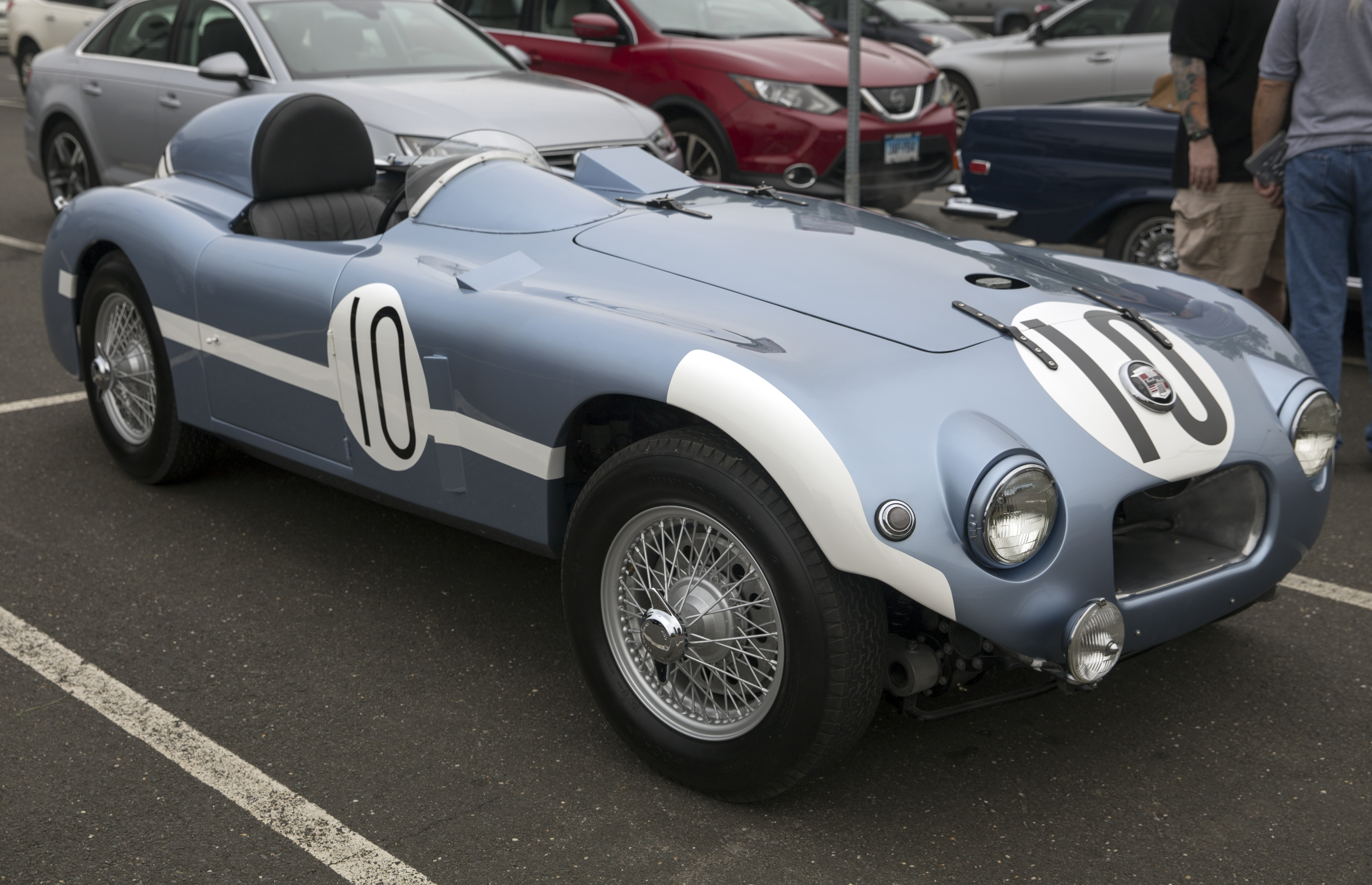
Nash-Healey of Johnson/Wisdom, which finished 3rd overall and won the S 5.0 class

Aston Martin, after their great success in the 1951 race, arrived with three new DB-3 cars, as well as two privately entered DB-2s, all fitted with the reliable 2.6L S6 engine. Sydney Allard decided to change engines this year, swapping the Cadillac for a Chrysler V8 and the new J2X had new bodywork to comply with the new ACO regulations. This year Donald Healey entered a pair of Nash-engined prototypes, one with a new body for the British drivers, the other with a new engine for his French drivers.

Talbot was the last of the old French manufacturers remaining in the large-engine classes with four privately entered T-26 cars (with strong support from the factory), now with the required new enclosed bodywork. André Chambas had modified his 4.5L engine by adding twin-superchargers which (by using the x1.4 supercharge-equivalence factor) meant his car (#6) had the biggest effective engine capacity and started at the head of the grid. Gordini, having gone their separate ways from Simca, were now powered with their own engines: a smaller team with the standard 1100cc car, and a special 2.3L version for its regular GP drivers, Jean Behra and Robert Manzon, which was very nimble. With the swarm of small-engined Panhards, Renaults and Simcas (as well as a supercharged Peugeot special), the French were the biggest nationality represented with 20 cars, followed by the 18 British cars.

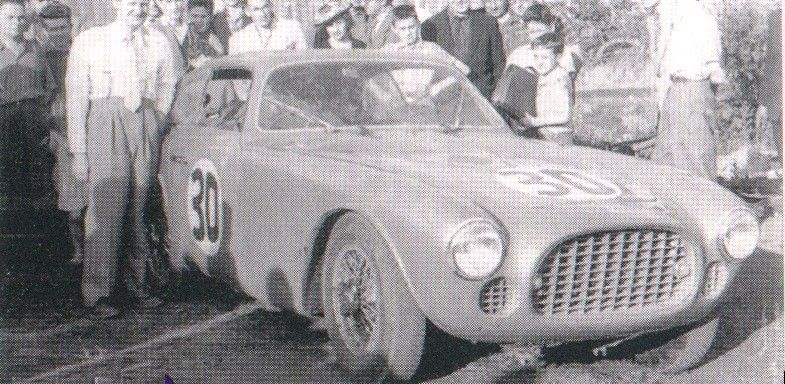
Tom Cole (left) next to the Ferrari 225 S he drove in the race

Ferrari was back again in force, with eight entrants including two in a works team, and a trio from Luigi Chinetti's American team. Alongside the previous year's '340 America' 4.1L model was the new '250 Sport' with a 3.0L V12 engine capable of 220 bhp (fresh from beating Mercedes and Jaguar in the Mille Miglia) and one of the smaller 2.7L '225 Sport' that had just taken the top five places at the Monaco Grand Prix (this year a sports-car race) a fortnight earlier. The '250 S' was to be driven by Enzo Ferrari's GP drivers Alberto Ascari and Luigi Villoresi, while the smaller works '225 S' was driven by Tom Cole Jr., latterly with Allard. Even Louis Rosier had jumped from Talbot to a pair of Ferrari 340 Americas. He was entered in one (racing with fellow French F1 racer Maurice Trintignant) and the other for his son.

Lancia's first foray the year before had been a win, and the works team returned with a pair of updated B20 Aurelias to again contest the 2-litre class. Another pre-war veteran, Luigi Fagioli, was to have driven (after scoring a 3rd place in the Mille Miglia) but had been critically injured at the same Monaco GP that Ferrari had won and could not compete. (He died of his wounds less than a week after the Le Mans race.)

Another future Italian stalwart of the race made its debut this year: OSCA had been set up by the three Maserati brothers after selling their namesake company, and arrived with their first sports car, the MT-4. Its 1.3L engine developed 90 bhp, putting it in a competitive contest against the Jowetts and Porsche.

Briggs Cunningham returned with his own cars and regular team-drivers John Fitch and Phil Walters. This year they had two new C-4R roadsters and one with a closed coupé body (C-4RK) designed by renowned pre-war aerodynamicist Wunibald Kamm. Made over 500 kg lighter than the 1951 C-2, they claimed the biggest engines just ahead of the Allards, with the burly 5.4L Chrysler 'Firepower' V8 putting out 320 bhp. Potential works entries from Alfa Romeo (for Juan-Manuel Fangio and José Froilán González) and Pegaso were scratched amid concerns about the cars being able to last the distance.

== Practice ==
The remodelled Jaguars soon showed up overheating problems what were to plague them through the race, despite some hasty modifications. A Le Mans star of the future, Phil Hill drove one of the Cunninghams in practice, but not in the race.

In the second practice session, Griffith heavily crashed his Aston Martin into the sandbank at Tertre Rouge, but team manager John Wyer managed to swap in the spare car without the officials noticing. Also needing a full rebuild after a practice crash was the new DB coupé. A piston failure during practice forced the scratching one of Louis Rosier's Ferraris. But it was Hermann Lang in the Mercedes which both set the fastest unofficial top speed on the 3 mile Mulsanne Straight, at some 150 mph. And the fastest lap in practice at 4m40s, just a tenth ahead of Ascari's Ferrari, with both fully 20 seconds faster than the ‘official' time of the Cunningham in 1951.

== Race ==
=== Start ===
After the wet race the previous year, this year's race was essentially dry. Leader after the first lap was Phil Walters in the Cunningham coupé, chased by Moss in the Jaguar and the red and blue Ferraris of Ascari and Simon respectively, then the other two Jaguars and Levegh's Talbot. Ascari soon got to the front and between him and Simon they took turnabout lowering Stirling Moss's lap record – eventually setting it six seconds faster than the previous year.

Soon enough though, after just 6 laps, Ascari was in the pits with clutch problems – something that would plague the Ferraris through the race. It was worse news at the Jaguar garage. Moss had moved back up to second when Ascari pitted but soon was also pitting, with overheating problems. By nightfall all three Jaguars were out of the race in a dramatic change of fortune to the previous year. Two of the Aston Martins had retired with differential issues. Phil Walters had kept the Cunningham coupé in close reach, and after 4 hours handed the car over to his co-driver Duane Carter who promptly planted it into the sandbank at Tertre Rouge on his second lap out. Soon after getting back in the race their engine started playing up with similar problems that had already sidelined John Fitch's car.

Surprising the home crowd, that moved the Gordini of Robert Manzon up behind Simon. Though running a much smaller engine than the cars around it, it was proving very fast. When Simon had to start nursing a slipping clutch, Manzon took the lead in the 3rd hour. Meanwhile, the three Mercedes-Benzes were playing a waiting game, running to Neubauer's strict, conservative pace to preserve the cars and hovering just in the top 10. After several trips to the pits, Vincent stuck the former lead Ferrari into the sandbank at Mulsanne corner, dropping it right down the order. Chinetti's own Ferrari moved up into the top five, while his 3rd car had fallen to clutch problems in the early evening, as had Rosier's car.

=== Night ===
Going into the night, Manzon and Behra kept their lead, and by midnight were a lap ahead of Levegh in his Talbot. However just before half-time one of the Gordini's brakedrums jammed and despite repairs the team considered too dangerous to risk continuing. This left Levegh sitting four laps ahead of the two Mercedes-Benzes of Helfrich / Niedermeyer and Lang / Riess, followed by the Macklin / Collins Aston Martin. But it was not an easy lead – he had already decided to drive right through on his own; the engine had developed a vibration and he did not want to risk his co-driver, René Marchand, with a breakdown. As in 1930, the leading Mercedes (Kling/Klenk) had retired during the night with a broken alternator, but this time it was backed up by two other Mercedes. Luigi Chinetti's Ferrari had been disqualified for refuelling a lap ahead of its prescribed time, leaving just the Simon / Vincent Ferrari in the race gradually making back ground. After successive second places in the previous years, luck ran out for Mairesse / Meyrat when their (aging) Talbot's oil pump expired around half-time. Meanwhile, in the S2.0 class, the Lancias had been running 1-2 for most of the race ahead of the Frazer-Nash's

=== Morning ===
Dawn was masked by a heavy fog, which got so thick the Mercedes drivers had to open their gull-wing doors to be able to see. It also caused Alexis Constantin to crash and roll his supercharged Peugeot at Tertre Rouge barely missing Jack Fairman's Allard. The other Allard had an equally hairy moment soon after when Arkus-Duntov found himself with no brakes at the end of the Mulsanne straight taking to the escape road, scattering spectators and gendarmes and narrowly avoiding parked cars. As the sun rose, Neubauer instructed his drivers to finally pick up the pace, but it was too late, the lead was too great. Levegh had driven through the night and still held a good lead. Near noon a damaged wheel cost Helfrich time and dropped his car to third. Macklin and Collins kept their Aston Martin at a steady pace in fourth. Late in the morning the leading Frazer-Nash of "Dickie" Stoop / Peter Wilson broke a halfshaft and retired, leaving the Lancias comfortably in front. Also retired at this time was the larger-engined Porsche, leading the S1500 class in a close tussle with the OSCA, running 14th and 15th overall respectively. It had come in to refuel and left the engine running in case it stalled permanently. That was against the safety rules and the officials disqualified the car. But the OSCA was no more fortunate: soon afterward, just coming out of Arnage, the clutch broke. Lacour got out and pushed the car the 3 km back to the pits only to be told by his pitcrew that the damage was terminal.

=== Finish and post-race ===
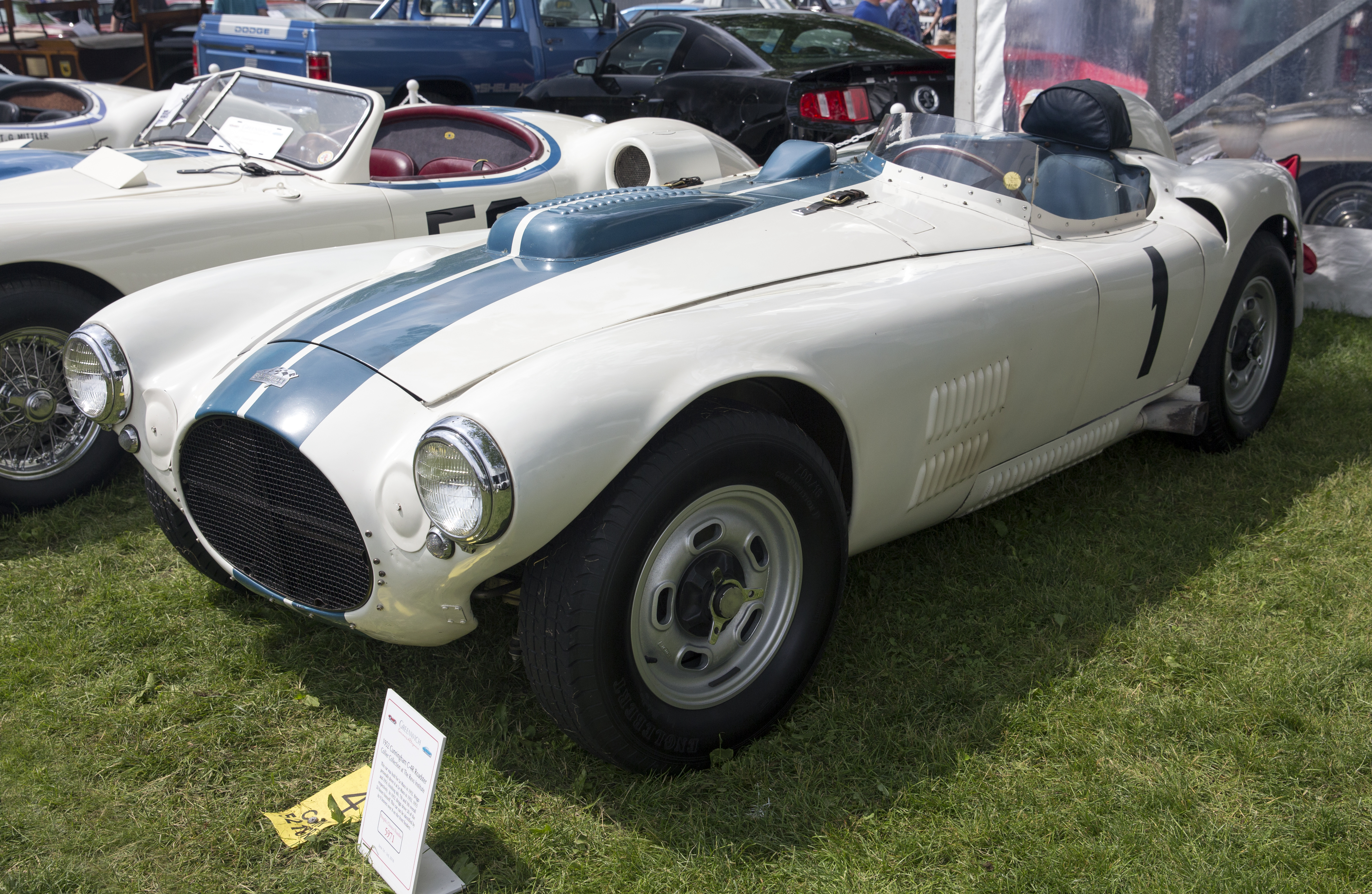
Cunningham C-4R of Cunningham/Spear, which finished 4th overall and won the S 8.0 class

The race was quietly running down to its conclusion, with the home crowd looking forward to a second French victory in four years. But then suddenly, with just over an hour to go, the connecting rod of Levegh's Talbot broke, causing it to come to a halt at Maison Blanche about a mile from the pits. Driving without a working rev-counter, it is uncertain whether either the engine issues finally broke it, or through sheer exhaustion, he missed a gear-change and over-revved the engine catastrophically. But such was his lead it still took 20 minutes for the second-placed Mercedes-Benz to get ahead on distance. A final twist saw the Aston Martin retire, moving the Nash-Healey of Johnson/Wisdom up to 3rd ahead of Briggs Cunningham's own car and the recovering Ferrari of Simon / Vincent. Like many, Cunningham had been nursing a slipping clutch through most of the race, driving for 20 hours himself gradually moving up the order.

So Mercedes-Benz, using undersized underpowered engines, were as surprised as anyone to have the 1-2 victory. This was the first win for a closed-body car, and for a German manufacturer. Although the weather had been good, it was a torrid race with a record 40 retirements from the 57 starters. The lone Ferrari had fought back into the top ten during the morning, and after the late-race retirements made it up to 5th. The privateer team of Clark and Keen was the only Aston Martin to finish this year (in 5th) and the only Talbot to finish was Chambas' supercharged special in 9th.

For the third year in a row, Jean Hémardwon the Index of Performance (although this year his co-driver was Eugène Dussous) in the little Monopole-Panhard. just ahead of the two Mercedes-Benz coupés. They also won the Biennial Cup and romped home in their S750 class fully 13 laps ahead of the closest Renault. Jowett also won its class, the S1500, for the third successive year, by outlasting the much faster but more fragile opposition.

The Lancias barely missed a beat getting a successive class win. The lead car of Bonetto / Anselmi was delayed around lunchtime, giving the lead to the sister car which it held to the end, with the team finishing 6th and 8th overall, well ahead (>20 laps) of the surviving Frazer-Nash rival in 10th which had been lapping for the last 3 hours with a loose wheel-mounting on the front right. Porsche repeated its S1100 class victory from the previous year, and by the same drivers as 1951: Paris Porsche agent, ‘Toto' Veuillet and Edmond Mouche. The last finisher in the race was a little Renault 4CV driven by Le Mans debutante, Jean Rédélé who, at 30 years old, was France's youngest Renault dealer. After a short racing career he would go on to found a significant new car company with Renault rear-mounted engines: Alpine.

A varied field of cars led to a competitive race. This helped cement Le Mans' place as one of the most important race on the motorsport calendar. Mercedes-Benz went on to win the Nürburgring and in the Carrera Panamericana. These races, along with Sebring 12 Hours, Mille Miglia and Le Mans, were run again next year as part of the inaugural 1953 World Sportscar Championship.

Gordini had its biggest success two weeks after Le Mans in Formula 2, when Jean Behra beat the Ferrari 500s in the final Grand Prix de la Marne at Reims.

== Official results ==
Pos	Class	No	Team	Drivers	Chassis	Engine	Laps
1	S 3.0	21	(Germany) Daimler-Benz A.G.	(Germany) Hermann Lang (Germany) Fritz Riess	Mercedes-Benz W194	Mercedes-Benz 3.0L S6	277
2	S 3.0	20	(Germany) Daimler-Benz A.G.	(Germany) Theo Helfrich (Germany) Helmut Niedermayr	Mercedes-Benz W194	Mercedes-Benz 3.0L S6	276
3	S 5.0	10	(United Kingdom) Donald Healey Motor Co.	(United Kingdom) Leslie Johnson (United Kingdom) Tommy Wisdom	Nash-Healey 4 Litre	Nash 4.1L S6	262
4	S 8.0	1	(United States) Briggs Cunningham	(United States) Briggs Cunningham (United States) William "Bill" Spear	Cunningham C-4R	Chrysler 5.4L V8	252
5	S 5.0	14	(United States) Luigi Chinetti	(France) André Simon (France) Lucien Vincent	Ferrari 340 America (Vignale)	Ferrari 4.1L V12	250
6	S 2.0	39	(Italy) Scuderia Lancia	(Italy) Luigi "Gino" Valenzano (Italy) "Ippocampo" (Umberto Castiglioni)	Lancia Aurelia B.20 GT	Lancia 1991cc V6	248
7	S 3.0	32	(United Kingdom) P.C.T. Clark (private entrant)	(United Kingdom) Peter Clark (United Kingdom) Mike Keen	Aston Martin DB2	Aston Martin 2.6L S6	248
8	S 2.0	40	(Italy) Scuderia Lancia	(Italy) Felice Bonetto (Italy) Enrico Anselmi	Lancia Aurelia B.20 GT	Lancia 1991cc V6	247
9	S 8.0	6	(France) A. Chambas (private entrant)	(France) André Chambas (France) André Morel	Talbot-Lago T26 SS Spyder	Talbot-Lago 4.5L S6 supercharged	235
10	S 2.0	42	(United Kingdom) Mrs P. Trevelyan (private entrant)	(United Kingdom) Rodney 'Roy' Peacock (United Kingdom) Gerry Ruddock	Frazer Nash Le Mans Mk.II	Bristol 1970cc S6	225
11	S 1.1	50	(Germany) Porsche KG	(France) Auguste Veuillet (France) Edmond Mouche	Porsche 356SL	Porsche 1086cc F4	220
12	S 1.1	52	(France) Automobiles Panhard et Levassor	(France) Robert Chancel (France) Charles Plantivaux	Monopole Dyna X86 Coupe	Panhard 851cc F2	217
13	S 1.5	45	(France) M. Becquart (private entrant)	(France) Marcel Becquart (United Kingdom) Gordon Wilkins	Jowett Jupiter R1	Jowett 1486cc F4	210
14	S 750	60	(France) Établissements Monopole	(France) Jean Hémard (France) Eugène Dussous	Monopole X84	Panhard 612cc F2	208
15	S 750	68 (Reserve)	(France) RNU Renault	(France) Ernest de Regibus (France) Marius Porta	Renault 4CV-1063	Renault 747cc S4	195
16	S 750	61	(France) R. Gaillard (private entrant)	(France) Raymond Gaillard (France) Pierre Chancel	Panhard Dyna X84 Sport	Panhard 611cc F2	186
17	S 750	67 (Reserve)	(France) RNU Renault	(France) Jean Rédélé (France) Guy Lapchin	Renault 4CV-1063	Renault 747cc S4	178

=== Did not finish ===
Pos	Class	No	Team	Drivers	Chassis	Engine	Laps	Reason
18	S 5.0	8	(France) Pierre Levegh (private entrant)	(France) Pierre Levegh (Pierre Bouillin) (France) René Marchand	Talbot-Lago T26 GS Spyder	Talbot-Lago 4.5L S6	-	Engine (24hr)
19	S 3.0	25	(United Kingdom) Aston Martin Ltd.	(United Kingdom) Lance Macklin (United Kingdom) Peter Collins	Aston Martin DB3 Spyder	Aston Martin 2.6L S6	-	Accident (22hr)
20	S 5.0	65 (Reserve)	(France) E. Chaboud (private entrant)	(France) Eugène Chaboud (France) Charles Pozzi	Talbot-Lago T26 GS Spyder	Talbot-Lago 4.5L S6	-	Accident (22hr)
21	S 1.5	48	(Italy) Automobili O.S.C.A.	(Italy) Dr. Mario Damonte (France) "Martial" (Fernand Lacour)	O.S.C.A. MT-4 Coupé (Vignale)	O.S.C.A. 1342cc S4	-	Clutch (19hr)
22	S 2.0	41	(United Kingdom) Automobiles Frazer Nash Ltd.	(United Kingdom) Richard 'Dickie' Stoop (United Kingdom) Peter Wilson	Frazer Nash Mille Miglia	Bristol 1979cc S6	-	Transmission (19hr)
23	S 1.5	47	(France) A. Lachaize (private entrant)	(France) Auguste Lachaize (France) Eugène Martin	Porsche 356SL	Porsche 1484cc F4	-	Disqualified (19hr) pit infringement
24	S 1.5	46	(United Kingdom) Jowett Cars Ltd.	(United Kingdom) Bert Hadley (United Kingdom) Tommy Wise	Jowett Jupiter R1	Jowett 1486cc F4	-	engine (17hr)
25	S 750	56	(France) J.-E. Vernet (private entrant)	(France) Just-Emile Vernet (France) Jean Pairard	Renault 4CV-1063	Renault 747cc S4	-	ignition (17hr)
26	S 3.0	31	(United Kingdom) N.H. Mann (private entrant)	(United Kingdom) Nigel Mann (United Kingdom) Mortimer Morris-Goodall	Aston Martin DB2	Aston Martin 2.6L S6	-	starter (16hr)
27	S 8.0	5	(United Kingdom) S.H. Allard	(United States) Zora Arkus-Duntov (United States) Frank Curtis	Allard J2X Le Mans	Chrysler 5.4L V8	-	transmission (15hr)
28	S 8.0	4	(United Kingdom) S.H. Allard	(United Kingdom) Sydney Allard (United Kingdom) Jack Fairman	Allard J2X Le Mans	Chrysler 5.4L V8	-	engine (15hr)
29	S 2.0	43	(France) A. Constantin (private entrant)	(France) Alexis Constantin (France) Jacques Poch	Peugeot 203C	Peugeot 1290cc S4 supercharged	-	accident (15hr)
30	S 5.0	12	(United States) Luigi Chinetti	(United States) Luigi Chinetti (France) Jean Lucas	Ferrari 340 America	Ferrari 4.1L V12	-	Disqualified (13hr) early refuel
31	S 3.0	34	(France) Automobiles Gordini	(France) Jean Behra (France) Robert Manzon	Gordini T15S	Gordini 2.3L S6	-	brakes / engine (13hr)
32	S 5.0	9	(France) P. Meyrat (private entrant)	(France) Pierre Meyrat (France) Guy Mairesse	Talbot-Lago T26 GS Spyder	Talbot-Lago 4.5L S6	-	oil pump (13hr)
33	S 3.0	33	(United States) Charles Moran Jr. (private entrant)	(United States) Charles Moran Jr. (Italy) Franco Cornacchia	Ferrari 212 MM	Ferrari 2.6L V12	-	electrics (12hr)
34	S 750	59	(France) Automobiles Panhard et Levassor	(France) Jacques Savoye (France) Raymond Lienard	Monopole X84	Panhard 612cc F2	-	engine (12hr)
35	S 3.0	30	(Italy) Scuderia Ferrari	(France) "Pagnibon" (Pierre Boncompagni) (United States) Tom Cole Jr.	Ferrari 225 S Berlinetta	Ferrari 2.7L V12	-	electrics (11hr)
36	S 1.5	64 (Reserve)	(Netherlands) M. Gatsonides (private entrant)	(Netherlands) Maurice Gatsonides (Netherlands) Hugo van Zuylen Nijeveldt	Jowett Jupiter R1	Jowett 1486cc F4	-	engine (9hr)
37	S 3.0	22	(Germany) Daimler-Benz A.G.	(Germany) Karl Kling (Germany) Hans Klenk	Mercedes-Benz W194	Mercedes-Benz 3.0L S6	-	electrics (9hr)
38	S 8.0	2	(United States) Briggs Cunningham	(United States) Phil Walters (United States) Duane Carter	Cunningham C-4RK	Chrysler 5.4L V8	-	engine (8hr)
39	S 750	54	(France) RNU Renault	(France) Louis Pons (France) Paul Moser	Renault 4CV-1063	Renault 747cc S4	-	accident (6hr)
40	S 1.1	51	(Germany) Porsche KG	(Germany) Fritz Huschke von Hanstein (Germany) Petermax Müller	Porsche 356SL	Porsche 1086cc F4	-	transmission (6hr)
41	S 8.0	3	(United States) Briggs Cunningham	(United States) John Fitch (United States) George "Rice" (George Viola)	Cunningham C-4R	Chrysler 5.4L V8	-	engine (6hr)
42	S 5.0	15	(France) Ecurie Rosier	(France) Louis Rosier (France) Maurice Trintignant	Ferrari 340 America Spyder	Ferrari 4.1L V12	-	clutch (6hr)
43	S 750	58	(France) Automobiles Deutsch et Bonnet	(France) Jean-Paul Colas (France) Robert Schollmann	DB Coach	Panhard 745cc F2	-	out of fuel (5hr)
44	S 1.5	44	(France) Automobiles Gordini	(France) Roger Loyer (France) Clarence de Rinen	Gordini T15S	Gordini 1490cc S4	-	clutch (5hr)
45	S 5.0	16	(United States) Luigi Chinetti	(France) "Heldé" (Pierre-Louis Dreyfus) (France) René Dreyfus	Ferrari 340 America Spyder	Ferrari 4.1L V12	-	clutch (5hr)
46	S 5.0	18	(United Kingdom) Jaguar Cars Ltd.	(United Kingdom) Tony Rolt (United Kingdom) Duncan Hamilton	Jaguar C-Type	Jaguar 3.5L S6	-	engine (4hr)
47	S 750	57	(France) Automobiles Deutsch et Bonnet	(France) René Bonnet (France) Élie Bayol	DB Sport	Panhard 745cc F2	-	transmission (4hr)
48	S 3.0	26	(United Kingdom) Aston Martin Ltd.	(United Kingdom) Dennis Poore (United Kingdom) Pat Griffith	Aston Martin DB3 Spyder	Aston Martin 2.6L S6	-	water pump (3hr)
49	S 3.0	35	(United Kingdom) R. Lawrie (private entrant)	(United Kingdom) Robert Lawrie (United Kingdom) John Isherwood	Morgan Plus 4	Standard 2.1L S4	-	water pump (3hr)
50	S 5.0	11	(United Kingdom) Donald Healey Motor Co.	(France) Pierre Veyron (France) Yves Giraud-Cabantous	Nash-Healey	Nash 4.1L S6	-	engine (3hr)
51	S 750	53	(France) RNU Renault	(France) Yves Lesur (France) André Briat	Renault 4CV-1063	Renault 747cc S4	-	transmission (3hr)
52	S 3.0	62	(Italy) Scuderia Ferrari	(Italy) Alberto Ascari (Italy) Luigi Villoresi	Ferrari 250 S Berlinetta	Ferrari 3.0L V12	-	clutch (3hr)
53	S 5.0	17	(United Kingdom) Jaguar Cars Ltd.	(United Kingdom) Stirling Moss (United Kingdom) Peter Walker	Jaguar C-Type	Jaguar 3.5L S6	-	engine (2hr)
54	S 5.0	19	(United Kingdom) Jaguar Cars Ltd.	(United Kingdom) Peter Whitehead (United Kingdom) Ian Stewart	Jaguar C-Type	Jaguar 3.5L S6	-	engine (2hr)
55	S 750	55	(France) J. Lecat (private entrant)	(France) Jacques Lecat (France) Henri Senfftleben	Renault 4CV-1063	Renault 747cc S4	-	engine (2hr)
56	S 3.0	27	(United Kingdom) Aston Martin Ltd.	(United Kingdom) Reg Parnell (United Kingdom) Eric Thompson	Aston Martin DB3 Coupe	Aston Martin 2.6L S6	-	transmission (2hr)
57	S 1.1	49	(France) Mécanorma	(France) Norbert Jean Mahé (France) José Scaron	Gordini T11 MM	Simca 1091cc S4	-	fuel pump (2hr)
58	S 5.0	7	(France) Ecurie Rosier	(France) Jean-Louis Rosier (France) Jean Estager	Ferrari 340 America	Ferrari 4.1L V12	0	engine Did not start

== 18th Rudge-Whitworth Biennial Cup (1951/1952) ==
Pos	Class	No	Team	Drivers	Chassis	Score
1	S 750	60	(France) Établissements Monopole	(France) Jean Hémard (France) Eugène Dussous	Monopole X84	1.295
2	S 5.0	10	(United Kingdom) Donald Healey Motor Co.	(United Kingdom) Leslie Johnson (United Kingdom) Tommy Wisdom	Nash-Healey 4 Litre	1.178
3	S 1.1	50	(Germany) Porsche KG	(France) Auguste Veuillet (France) Edmond Mouche	Porsche 356 SL	1.170
4	S 750	61	(France) R. Gaillard (private entrant)	(France) Raymond Gaillard (France) Pierre Chancel	Panhard Dyna X84 Sport	1.160
5	S 3.0	32	(United Kingdom) P.C.T. Clark (private entrant)	(United Kingdom) Peter Clark (United Kingdom) Mike Keen	Aston Martin DB2	1.157
6	S 5.0	14	(United States) Luigi Chinetti	(France) André Simon (France) Lucien Vincent	Ferrari 340 America (Vignale)	1.121
7	S 2.0	42	(United Kingdom) Mrs P. Trevelyan (private entrant)	(United Kingdom) Rodney 'Roy' Peacock (United Kingdom) Gerry Ruddock	Frazer Nash Le Mans Mk.II	1.079
8	S 8.0	6	(France) A. Chambas (private entrant)	(France) André Chambas (France) André Morel	Talbot-Lago T26 SS Spyder	1.052
9	S 1.5	45	(France) M. Becquart (private entrant)	(France) Marcel Becquart (United Kingdom) Gordon Wilkins	Jowett Jupiter R1	1.051

== Statistics ==
- Fastest Lap in practice – Hermann Lang, #21 Mercedes-Benz W194 – 4m 40.0s; 173.40 kp/h (107.7 mph)
- Fastest Lap – Alberto Ascari, #62 Ferrari 250 S– 4m 40.5s; 173.16 kp/h (107.6 mph)
- Distance – 3733.8 km (2320.2 miles)
- Winner's Average Speed – 155.58 km/h (96.7 mph)
- Attendance – est. 400 000 (start), 200 000 during the race

== Trophy winners ==
- 18th Rudge-Whitworth Biennial Cup – #60 Pierre Hérnard / Eugène Dussous
- Index of Performance – #60 Pierre Hérnard / Eugène Dussous
- Coupe des Dames - Mme Denise Bouillin, as there were no female drivers this year
