= Tom Cole (racing driver) =

British-American racecar driver

- Nationality: (United Kingdom) British (United States) American
- Born: Thomas Lionel Howard Cole Jr. 11 June 1922 Llandaff, South Glamorgan, Wales
- Died: 14 June 1953 (aged 31) Circuit de la Sarthe, Le Mans, Pays de la Loire, France
24 Hours of Le Mans career
- Years: 1950–1953
- Teams: S. H. Allard, Scuderia Ferrari and Luigi Chinetti
- Best finish: 3rd (1950)
- Class wins: 1 (1950)

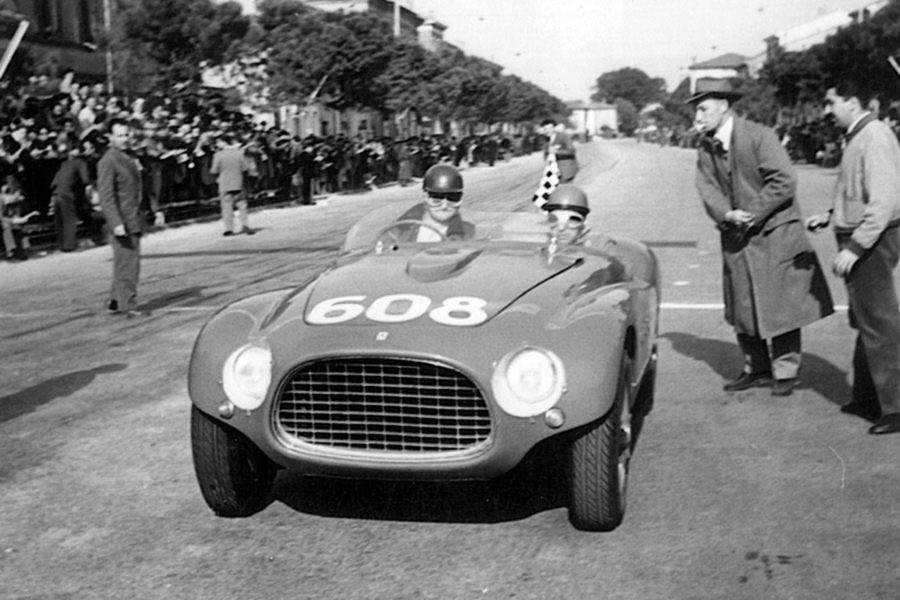
Tom Cole and navigator Mario Vandelli, in Cole's Ferrari 340 MM at the 1953 Mille Miglia.

Thomas Lionel Howard Cole Jr. (11 June 1922 – 14 June 1953), also known as Tom Cole or Tommy Cole, was a British-American racing driver and co-creator of the Cadillac-Allard sports car. Afflicted by childhood polio, he served in non-combat roles in World War II, and then took up rallying, hillclimbing, and sports car racing full-time after the war. He died, aged 31, in a crash while driving in the 1953 24 Hours of Le Mans.

== Early life ==
Cole was born in Llandaff, in South Glamorgan, Wales, U.K. on 11 June 1922. He contracted polio in childhood, and largely recovered, but the illness left him with minor disabilities, for the rest of his life. His family emigrated to America when he was seventeen arriving in New York City on 28 August 1939. He attended Harvard University for a year, served in the U.S. Merchant Marine and then drove an ambulance for the American Field Service. Upon returning from the war, he began to volunteer for Bill Frick and Phil Walters' famed Frick-Tappett circle-track racing team. In Frick's words, "Tommy Cole would meet us at the gate at races all around the East. He'd get on the running board of the tow car and we'd tell the man at the gate that he was with us. At first, he didn't know which end of the screwdriver to use, but after awhile he became quite helpful. In the parlance of the circle-track racing scene, we called these people 'pit stooges.' They were just fellows who wanted to be around the racing scene and did not have a car."

== Racing career ==
=== First hillclimbs and sportscar races ===
Cole split his time between the US and the UK after the war. In 1947, Cole took part in the Bugatti Owner's Club (B.O.C.) Opening Rally in Bisley, Surrey, driving a "very transatlantic" Buick. He was noted as being a new member. Following this, he tuned his 3 1/2 litre Jaguar SS100 for hillclimbs and sportscar races. In July, he raced the car at Gransden Lodge Airfield but it blew up on the first lap. In September, he drove it to second in class in the Brighton Speed Trials and made his first appearance in the Prescott Speed Hill Climb.

Cole returned to Prescott in June 1948 and recorded the fastest time in his class, a feat he would repeat at the July meeting. He placed second in class at the Boscombe Speed Trials in August before returning to Prescott in September for a third class victory, this time in very wet conditions.

Cole then brought his Jaguar and an HRG 1500 to the United States, racing first at the 1949 Bridgehampton Sports Car Races, held on June 11 of 1949. Bridgehampton founder Bruce Stevenson recalled that "Tommy Cole was well known to all as a gentleman... charmingly forgetful of his passport, his wallet, his helmet and the unimportant details of daily life. But in a thrilling exhibition of driving skill, he piloted the Jaguar to second place using only one hand on the controls—the other was occupied holding the battery in position!" He drove his HRG 1500 to fifth place in the 1500cc heat, then drove his Jaguar to second behind George Huntoon's Alfa Romeo 8C in the 100 mile event. In September, he raced the HRG at the Watkins Glen Grand Prix to fifth in the supporting Seneca Cup and fourth in the feature race, winning his class in both.

=== Cad-Allard years ===
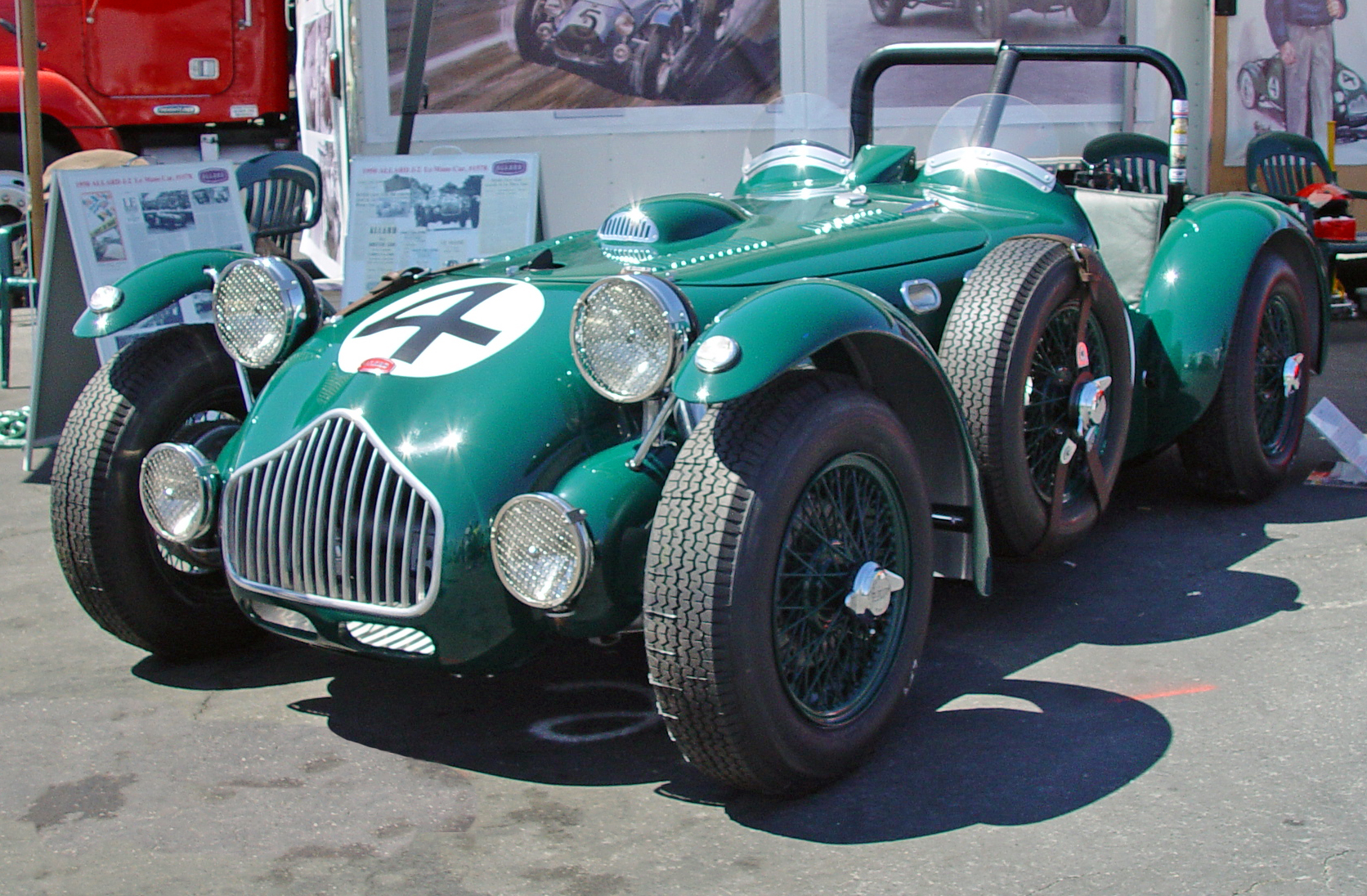
The Cadillac-Allard J2 in which Cole finished third at the 1950 24 Hours of Le Mans, photographed at the 2006 Monterey Historics, Laguna Seca.

Cole's ability soon exceeded the potential of the Jaguar and he approached Bill Frick, of Frick-Tappet Racing, to see if the car could accommodate a 331 cu in (5.4 L) Cadillac engine. It would not so he imported an Allard J2 from England through his father's shipping company and installed the engine into this car instead. The Cadillac-Allard J2, or Cad-Allard, fused a lightweight chassis and modern suspension system with a large powerplant, and would achieve considerable international success. Cole is credited with its creation.

The first race for the new car was at Palm Beach Shores in January 1950. Cole led for two laps before being passed by eventual winner Huntoon. He finished seventh after a spin, but was disqualified for receiving a push. In May, he won the heat race for the Heart Trophy at Suffolk County Airport and led the feature, but suffered a cracked rear wheel and finished second behind Briggs Cunningham. He took his first major race victory at Bridgehampton Sports Car Races in June, leading flag to flag and setting the fastest lap. The same month, he raced a Cad-Allard at Le Mans with marque founder Sydney Allard, placing third overall despite only having top gear for most of the race. The car was permitted to race as a prototype given that few units had been sold at the time. In July, he competed in the Leinster Trophy but retired. In September, he returned to the Watkins Glen Grand Prix; he slid off track from pole but Erwin Goldschmidt won in a Cad-Allard. Cole partnered with Goldschmidt for the inaugural Sebring 6 Hours in December; the latter wrote to Motor Sport hailing the Cad-Allard as one of the greatest sportscars of 1950, even above the Jaguar XK120 that had been so successful on the Continent.

Cole damaged his Cad-Allard in a crash. His friend and racing patron, John Perona, offered him a Chrysler Hemi powered Allard for the 1951 Buenos Aires Grand Prix. Due to the engine's massive torque, the car suffered from transmission problems during practice and the race. John Fitch won, ironically driving Cole's Cad-Allard which he had borrowed and repaired. His adventure in Argentina did not end there, as shown in a letter he wrote to his friend Vic Franzese (owner of the Glen Motor Inn in Watkins Glen, New York north of Elmira):

"He was in a light plane that had crashed in the jungle. The pilot had a .45 handgun and a knife. They survived eating snakes. It took them two weeks to find civilization in Brazil. They were found by the natives."

Returning to the US, he drove his Chrysler-engined Allard to another win at the Bridgehampton Sports Car Races, sweeping the S+3.0 support race and the 100 mile feature. He returned with Sydney Allard to Le Mans in a Cad-Allard, retiring with clutch problems around the 12-hour mark. He won the sportscar class in a Chrysler-Allard at the Leinster Trophy and set a sportscar lap record at the event, lapping the Wicklow Circuit at an average speed of 81.38 mph (130.97 km/h). He travelled to the Targa Florio but did not compete, and did not get back in time to take up his entry for the Tourist Trophy at Dundrod.

=== European racing campaign ===
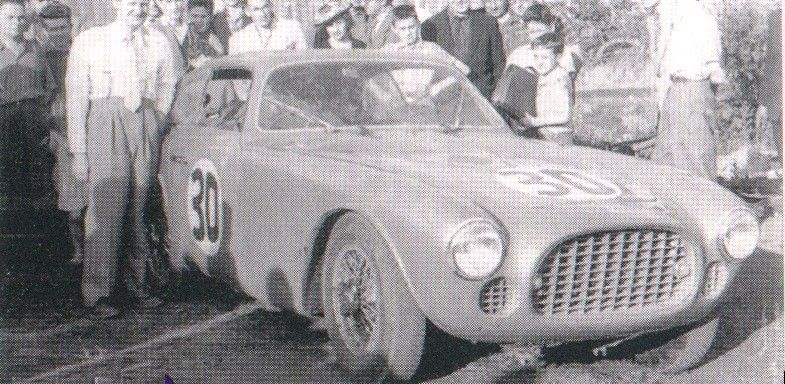
Cole (left), standing next to the Ferrari 225 S owned by his co-driver "Pagnibon" at the 1952 24 Hours of Le Mans.

In March 1952, Cole took second place in the Vero Beach 12 Hour Endurance Road Race. He was surrounded by Ferrari drivers on the podium. That summer he launched his European racing campaign at Le Mans, with a Ferrari 225 S, serial number 0152EL, belonging to his co-driver "Pagnibon" but entered by Scuderia Ferrari. They ran as high as 15th before retiring with ignition issues. Shortly after, he purchased his own Vignale bodied 225 S, serial number 0194ET. He drove it in two Italian road races: the Targa Florio (placing 11th overall) and the Dolomites Gold Cup Race (15th overall). August saw Cole return to Britain with his Ferrari. He took part in the Daily Mail International Festival at the Boreham Circuit, finishing fifth in the S+2.0 race despite fading brakes. A fortnight later, he partnered Graham Whitehead in the inaugural Goodwood Nine Hours, finishing second in a race of high attrition despite again suffering fading brakes. His Ferrari was photographed during this race and featured on the cover of Motor Sport in September 1952. Cole followed this up with second place at the Bari Grand Prix.

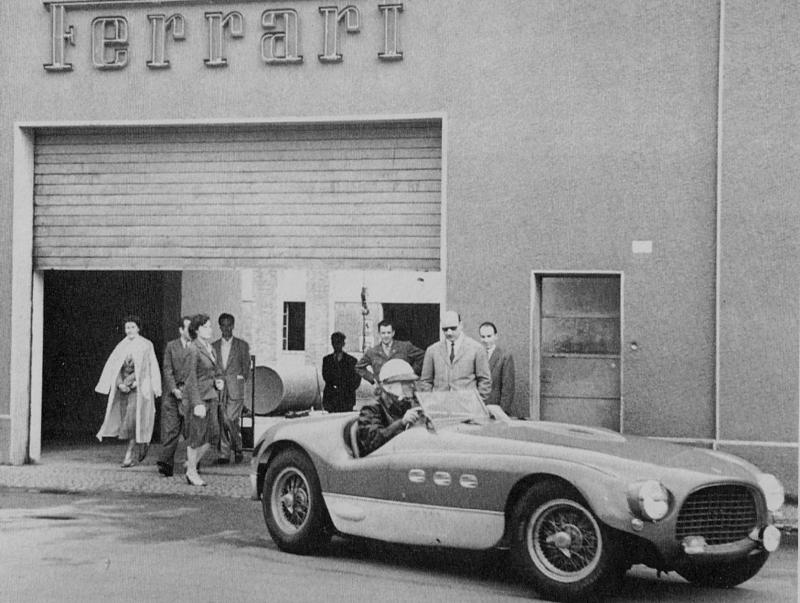
Cole leaves the Ferrari factory in Modena in his Ferrari 340 MM, restyled in North American racing colours, 20 May 1953.

In 1953, Cole returned to Europe and purchased a 340 MM Vignale; the car's serial number was 0284AM. He sold the 225 S to Ecurie Francorchamps. He entered the 1953 Mille Miglia in April and, despite having never driven the 1,000 mile course before, finished fourth with Swiss navigator Mario Vandelli after a steady, controlled drive. He drove to second place in the sportscar race supporting the BRDC International Trophy in early May.

The same year, Cole began a foray into single-seater racing with the Atlantic Stable team. He made his debut in March in the Syracuse Grand Prix driving a Cooper T23, only for a burst tyre to cause his car to crash and burst into fire. At the International Trophy, he entered the main Formula Two race in addition to the sportscar race, driving a Ferrari 500. In Heat 1, he collided with Joe Kelly and later ran out of power in a separate incident, but finished the heat in 15th. He did not feature in the final, presumably unable to fix the issue with his car. Cole focused on single-seaters for the rest of May. Back in a T23, he was a reserve entry for the Ulster Trophy and Coronation Trophy but did not compete, and reached his first and only single-seater finish at the Grand Prix d'Albi, coming home 7th despite a broken gear-change forcing him to coast into most corners in neutral.

Cole returned to sportscars for June. Staying in France, he partnered with Peter Whitehead to a victory in the rainy French International 12 Hours of Hyères in Whitehead's Jaguar C-Type. However, the event was marred by the fatal accident of his Le Mans co-driver "Pagnibon".

=== Death at Le Mans ===
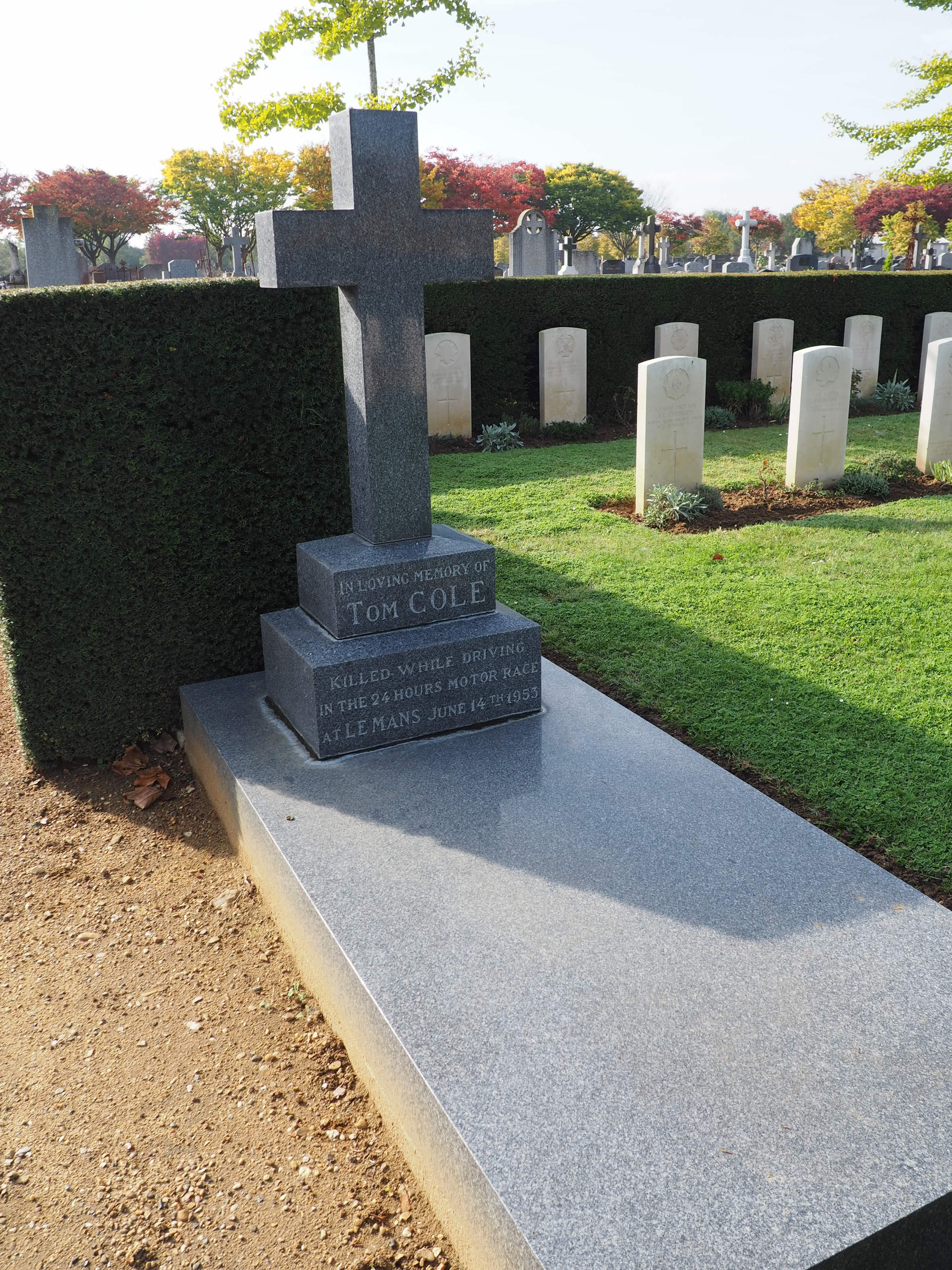
Tom Cole's grave in Le Mans Cimettiere De L'Ouest.

On 13 June 1953, Cole started his fourth Le Mans in his 340 MM, this time co-driven by Luigi Chinetti. The race started well, with the car running as high as third during the first three hours, but it had fallen to sixth by the fourteenth hour as morning broke in fog. Cole began a charge, unusual for this phase of the race and for the conditions, and was catching the fifth-placed car of Peter Whitehead by 10 to 20 seconds per lap. At 6:14 a.m., Cole lost control passing a slower car at Maison Blanche. The Ferrari hit a bank and demolished a wooden hut. Cole was ejected from the car and died instantly from his injuries.

Cole had previously expressed his wish that, if he were killed during a motor race, he should be buried near the venue. He was interred at the Le Mans West Cemetery in accordance with this wish.

== Nationality ==
Born a British citizen, Cole had applied for U.S. citizenship and that process was still underway at the time of his death. He held an American racing driver's license, and his Ferrari at the 1952 Targa Florio was painted in North American racing colours (the FIA required cars to be painted in their drivers' national colours). He has been referred to as "an Anglo-American, who called both countries home."

== Legacy ==
Since 2016, the VSCC has hosted an annual race for 1950s sportscars known as the Tom Cole Trophy.

== Racing record ==
=== Career highlights ===
Season	Series	Position	Team	Car
1949	Bridgehampton 100 Mile	2nd	Tom Cole	Jaguar SS100
1950	Bridgehampton Sports Car Races	1st		Allard-Cadillac J2
	Heart Trophy	2nd	T. L. H. Cole	Allard-Cadillac J2
	24 Heures du Mans	3rd	S. H. Allard	Allard-Cadillac J2
1951	Bridgehampton Sports Car Races	1st	John Perona	Allard-Chrysler J2
	Bridgehampton 100 Mile	1st	John Perona	Allard-Chrysler J2
1952	Second Annual Florida Handicap Vero Beach Endurance Road Race	2nd	John Perona	Allard-Cadillac J2, the Cole-owned car that won both Bridgehampton in 1950 and the Argentine Sports Car Grand Prix in 1951, driven by John Fitch. The car had been modified for endurance racing by noted race mechanic Jim McGee and had been entered in both the 1952 Vero Beach and Sebring events. Transmission damage suffered at Vero Beach resulted in a DNS at Sebring.
	Goodwood Nine Hours	2nd	Tom Cole	Ferrari 225 S
	Gran Premio di Bari [S+1.1]	2nd	Tom Cole	Ferrari 225 S
1953	12 heures d'Hyères	1st	P. N. Whitehead	Jaguar C-Type
	Silverstone International	2nd	Atlantic Stable	Ferrari 340 MM Spyder Vignale

=== Complete 24 Hours of Le Mans results ===
Year	Team	Co-Drivers	Car	Class	Laps	Pos.	Class Pos.
1950	(United Kingdom) S. H. Allard	(United Kingdom) Sydney Allard	Allard-Cadillac J2	S8.0	251	3rd	1st
1951	(United Kingdom) S. H. Allard	(United Kingdom) Sydney Allard	Allard-Cadillac J2	S8.0	134	DNF (Gearbox)	
1952	(Italy) Scuderia Ferrari	(France) "Pagnibon"	Ferrari 225 S Berlinetta Vignale	S3.0		DNF (Electrics)	
1953	(United States) Luigi Chinetti	(United States) Luigi Chinetti	Ferrari 340 MM Spyder Vignale	S5.0	175	DNF (Fatal accident - Cole)	

=== Complete 12 Hours of Sebring results ===
Year	Team	Co-Drivers	Car	Class	Laps	Pos.	Class Pos.
1950	(United States) A. E. Goldschmidt (private entrant)	(United States) Erwin Goldschmidt	Allard-Cadillac J2X	S8.0	50	DSQ	
1952	(United States)	(United States) Paul O'Shea	Allard-Cadillac J2X	S8.0		DNS (Transmission)	
1953	(United States) William Lloyd	(United States) Bill Lloyd	Ferrari 340 America	S5.0		DNS (Engine)	

=== Complete Mille Miglia results ===
Year	Team	Co-Drivers	Car	Class	Pos.	Class Pos.
1953		(Switzerland) Mario Vandelli	Ferrari 340 MM Spyder Vignale	S+2.0	4th	

=== Complete 12 Hours of Hyères results ===
Year	Team	Co-Drivers	Car	Class	Laps	Pos.	Class Pos.
1953	(United Kingdom) P. N. Whitehead	(United Kingdom) Peter Whitehead	Jaguar C-Type	S+3.0	204	1st	1st

Sporting positions
Preceded by Jean Heurtaux; Marceau Crespin	12 heures d'Hyères; 1953	Succeeded by Maurice Trintignant; Luigi Piotti
