= Allard J2 =

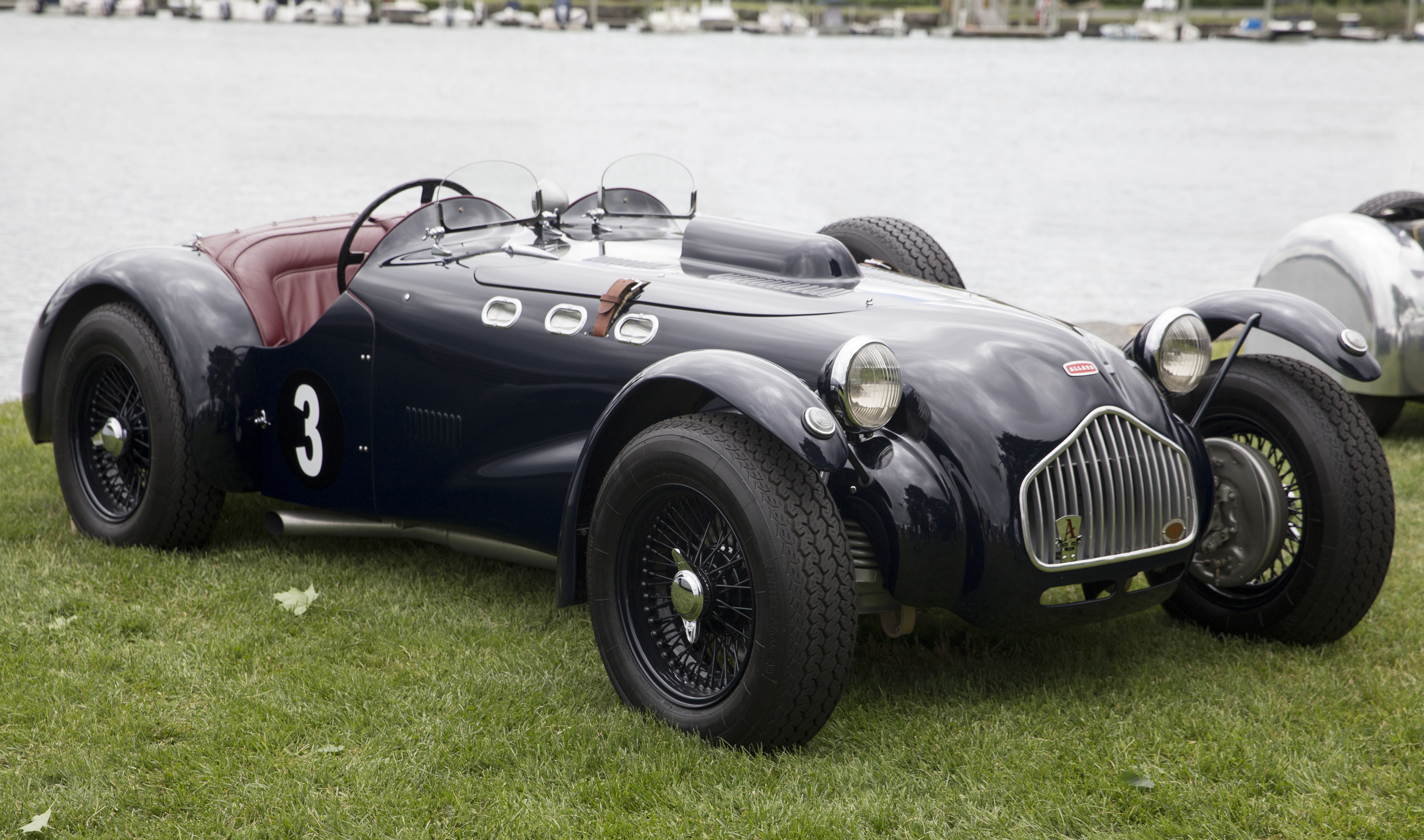
- 1950 Allard J2

Overview
- Manufacturer: Allard
- Production: J2: 1949-1951 (90 units); 1951-1954 (83 units); 1999-present
- Model years: 1950-1951 (J2); 1951-1954, 2018-present (J2X); 1999 - present (J2X MkII)
- Assembly: Clapham, London UK

Body and chassis
- Class: Sports car
- Body style: Roadster
- Layout: Front engine, rear-wheel drive
- Related: Allard J2X

Powertrain
- Transmission: 3-speed manual

Dimensions
- Wheelbase: 100 in (2,540.0 mm)
- Length: 155 in (3,937.0 mm)
- Width: 68 in (1,727.2 mm)
- Kerb weight: 2,072 lb (940 kg)

Chronology
- Predecessor: Allard J
- Successor: Allard J2X

The Allard J2 is a sports roadster that was made by Allard. The J2 was mainly intended for the American market. Since 1981, replicas of the later J2X have been manufactured by a succession of companies in Canada, whilst a continuation of the original models is also now being produced in the UK.

== J2 ==
The standard J2 engine in Britain was the 3.6 L flathead V8 engine from the Ford Pilot, delivering 85 hp. A 4.4 L Mercury V8, delivering 110 hp was also available. American enthusiasts modified their cars by fitting an Oldsmobile, Chrysler, or Cadillac V8. J2s exported to the United States were shipped without engines. Then, an engine of the buyer's choice installed locally. This proved to be very successful, and the use of American components made it very easy to find parts for Allard's customers. The front suspension was a swing axle with coil springs while the rear had a De Dion tube system with coil springs, inboard brakes and a quick-change differential. Ninety J2s were built between 1949 and 1951.

== J2X ==
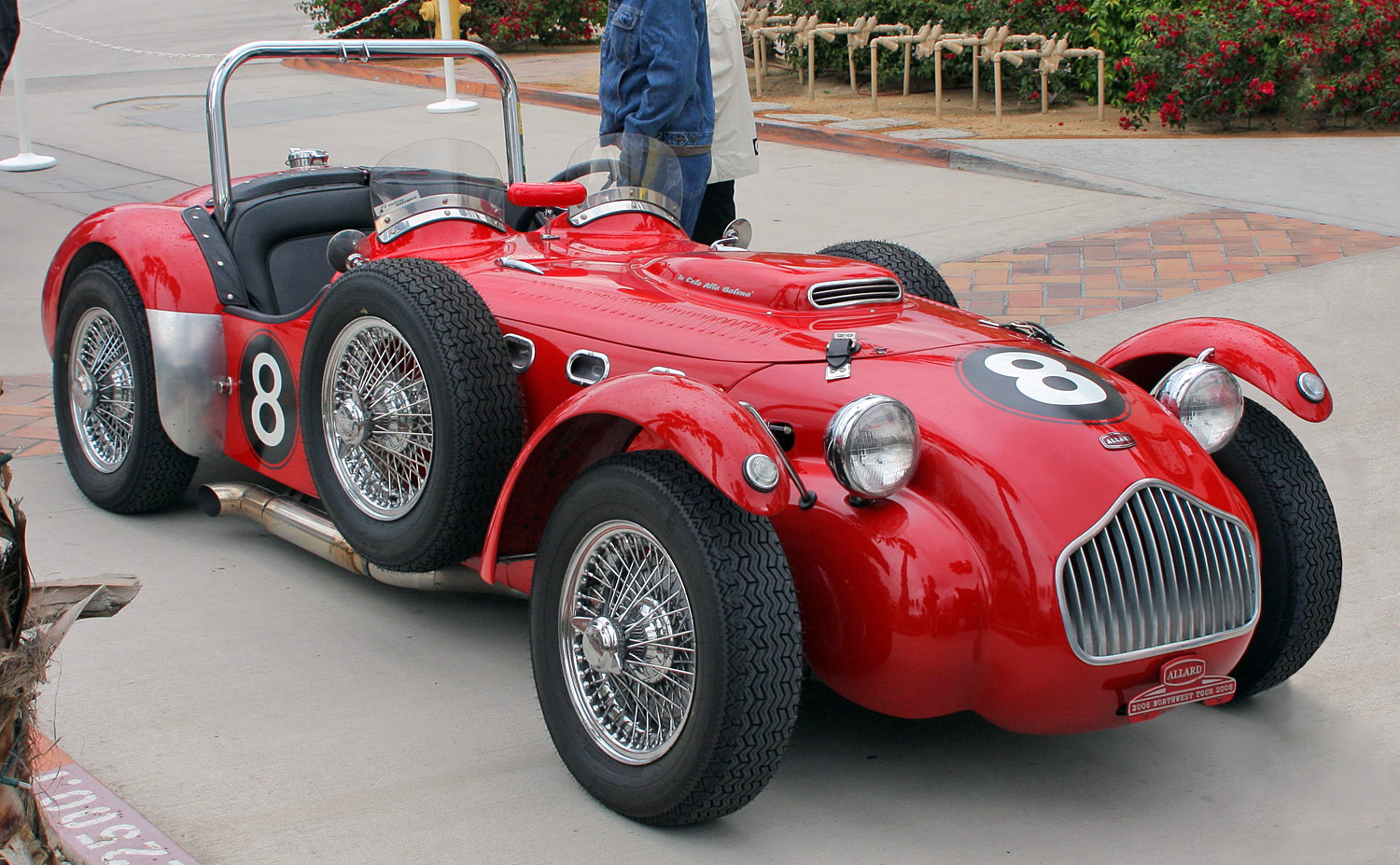
1953 Allard J2X, with later rollbar fitted

In 1952 Allard replaced the J2 with the J2X. It was produced until 1954. In an attempt to improve handling, the J2X had redesigned front suspension arrangement that allowed its engine to be positioned about 18 centimetres (7.1 in) further forward than the J2 engine had been. This did a few things beside improving the weight distribution: it gave the driver more leg room, and also facilitated easy identification between the two models J2 and J2X ("X" for extended). The longer nose sticks out beyond the front wheels (unlike the J2 where the nose stops even with the front of the front tires) and this is the easiest way to differentiate between the two. The J2X also had side access panels for the engine and most models came with a standardized wide flat hood scoop, unlike the J2s where each one has a different custom built hood arrangement. Also offered as an option was a differential with quick-change ratios, and a larger fuel tank. Its 170 hp engine could propel the car from 0-60 in 10 seconds and gave the J2X a top speed of 111.6 mph. 83 J2Xs were built. The interior remained simple with only a few gauges.

=== J2X Le Mans ===
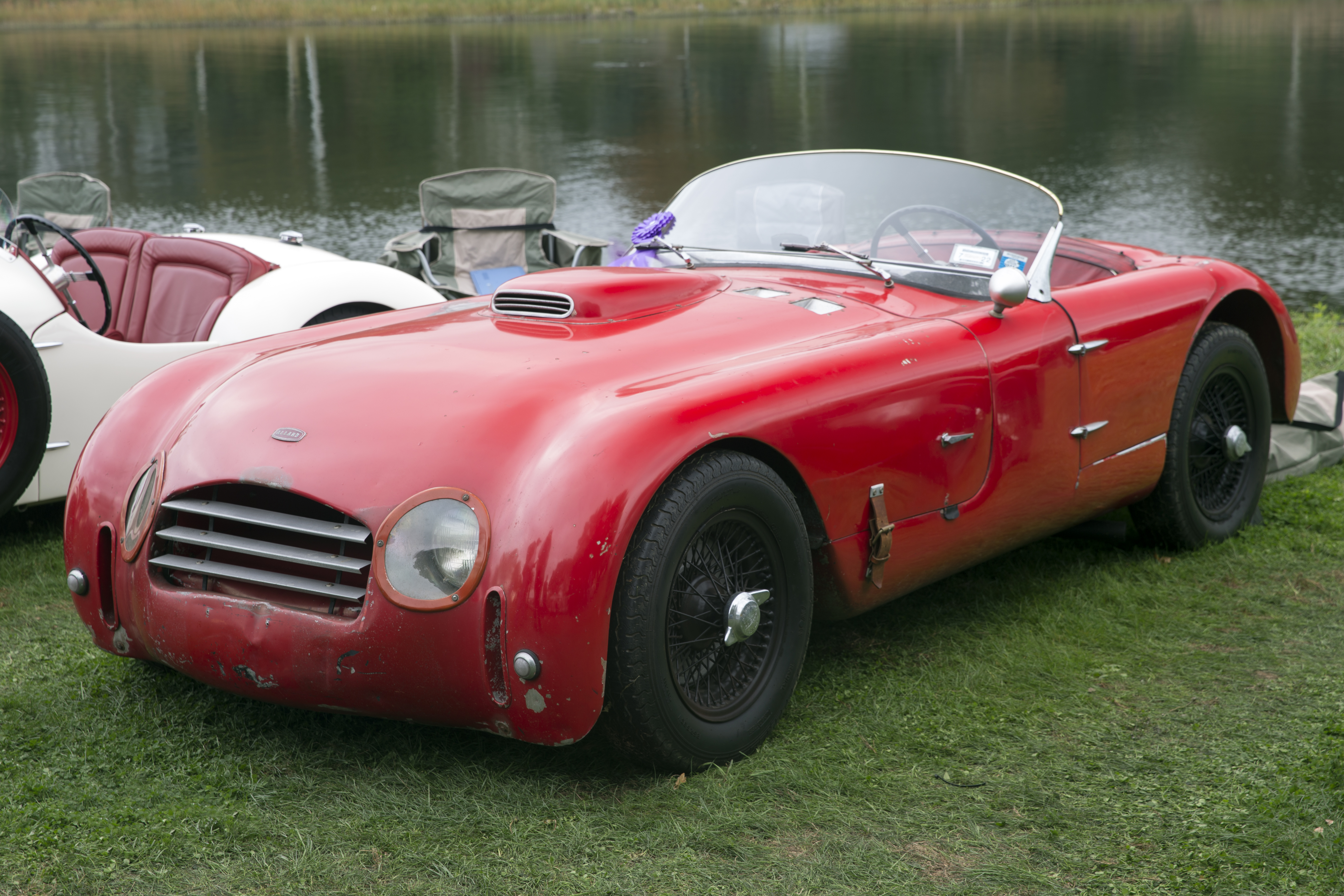
1953 Allard J2X Le Mans

For the 1952 Le Mans 24-hours race, new rule changes required fully enclosed wheels. Allard quickly developed new, barchetta-style bodywork to meet the regulations and called the resulting car the J2X Le Mans. Between nine and fourteen such cars were built, fitted with various American V8 engines as per Allard practice. While one of the fastest Allards ever, the design was past its time and was never fully competitive in the period. Two cars competed in the 1952 Le Mans, but both cars retired in the fifteenth hour. The best results were a second place in a 1952 Formula Libre race at Snetterton, and a handful of victories in American SCCA races.

== Canadian replica Allards ==
=== J2X2 ===
Beginning their work in 1981, two Canadian enthusiasts in Ontario revived the J2X concept as the J2X2. Mel Stein and Arnold Korne, who owned the coachbuilding company A.H.A. Manufacturing Company Limited, characterized their effort as a revival rather than a recreation, although a number of changes were carried out compared to the original design. The wheels on the J2X2 are considerably smaller than period pieces, the bodywork is in a mix of aluminium and fibreglass, the steering rack was swapped to a rack and pinion unit, while the front suspension was changed to a more conventional wishbone design. The brakes were power assisted, and the front drums were replaced by discs. It was available in kit form, or fully built. The fully built version received Chrysler's 5.2-liter V8 engine and a four-speed manual gearbox, although an automatic unit was available. The car also received rudimentary protection from the elements in the form of loose side windows and a simple hood. There was also a competition version without the intrusion of modern bumpers and with a shorter windscreen. A right-hand drive version was available for British buyers. Allard's son Alan fully approved of the car, even taking on the European distribution. A total of 250 units were planned.

=== J2X MkII ===
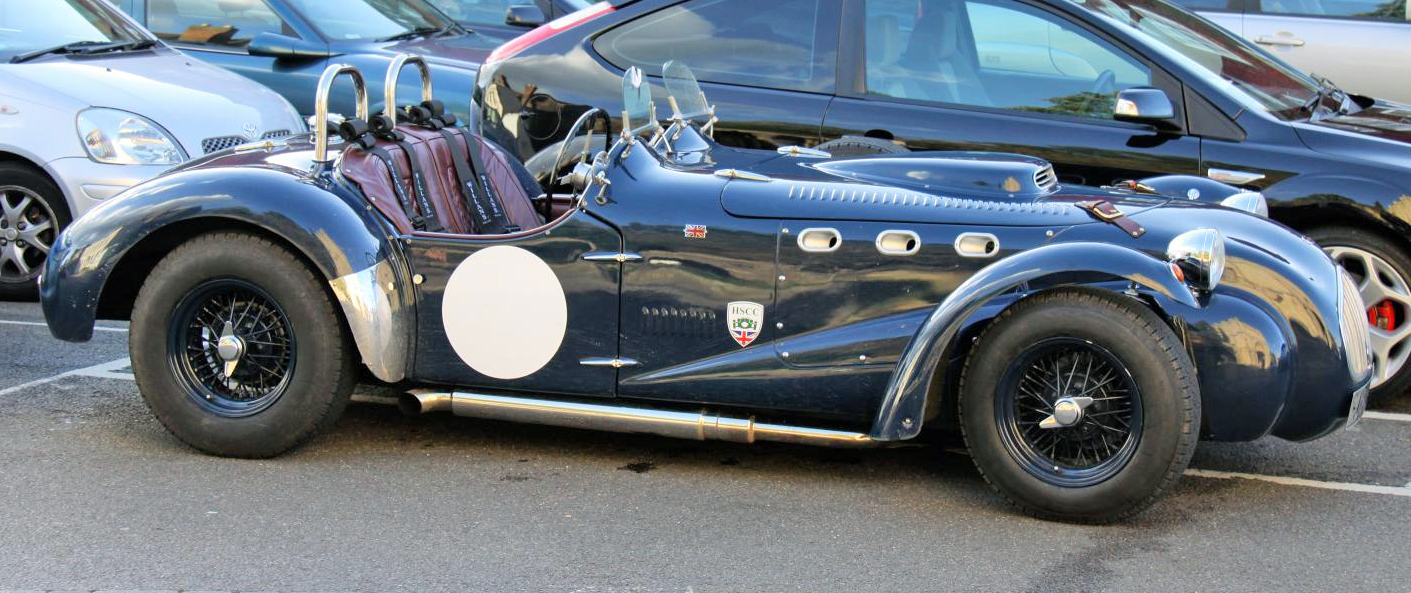
2010 Allard J2X MkII

Roger P Allard's, Allard Motor Works, located in Montreal, Quebec, Canada, builds what their website calls "a modern hand-crafted version of the famed British competition roadster that stirred crowds in Europe and North America", known as the J2X MkII. While looking similar to the original J2X, its glass-fibre body is dimensionally dissimilar and the chassis and drive-train are entirely different. Aside from the badges, few if any parts are transferable between this and a Sydney Allard built car. Roger Allard and Allard Motor Works are not connected or related to the original Allard company or Sydney Allard in London England.

The 'J2X MkII' is a fibreglass bodied lookalike in the spirit of the original 1951-1954 J2X. Allard engineers hand built the car at a rate of 100 per year, while keeping it in compliance with modern standards for automotive safety. The new J2X has a GM RAM Jet V8 engine that produces about 350 hp and 400 lb/ft of torque. Other engine choices include a 600-hp 6.1-liter Hemi, a Chevrolet 350, Cadillac Northstar or Ford 351. The 0-60 time is 4.5 seconds and the quarter mile time is 12 seconds at 110 mph. Power is transferred through a Tremec TKO five-speed manual transmission. The price for the J2X is $138,500.

== New British Allards ==
In 2012, a new Allard company, Allard Sports Cars, was formed by Lloyd Allard, and announced they would be making new versions of the J2X. Unlike the Canadian versions, which are new designs based on the original, the British cars are continuations of the original designs. The company officially reopened its business and began production in September 2018.

== Competition history ==
J2

In 1951, Bill Pollack drove an Allard J2 with a Cadillac V8 to victory at the Pebble Beach Road Race. Sydney Allard and Tom Cole drove a J2 with a Cadillac engine to third place in the 1950 24 Hours of Le Mans.They achieved this even though the first and second gears of the 3-speed gearbox were broken Of 313 documented starts in major races in the 9 years between 1949 and 1957, J2s compiled a list of 40 first-place finishes; 32 seconds; 30 thirds; 25 fourths; and 10 fifth-place finishes.[4] Both Zora Duntov (the father of the Corvette) and Carroll Shelby (the father of the Cobra) raced J2s in the early 1950s.

J2X

Arriving later during a time when sports racing car design was developing rapidly, the J2X was not as successful in international racing as the J2, as it was not as competitive when compared to more advanced C and later D type Jaguars with disc brakes, alongside Mercedes, Ferrari, and Maserati works entries. Thus, it headlined less often in major international races and of 199 documented major race starts in the 9 years between 1952 and 1960, J2X's garnered 12 first-place finishes; 11 seconds; 17 thirds; 14 fourths; and 10 fifth places.

Overall, both cars epitomize the pinnacle of the Allard Motor Company and are generally the car design thought of when the name Allard is mentioned.

== Bibliography ==
- Culshaw, David; Horrobin, Peter (2013) [1974]. "Allard". The complete catalogue of British Cars 1895 - 1975 (Ebook ed.). Poundbury, Dorchester, UK: Veloce Publishing. pp. 31–32. ISBN 978-1-845845-83-4.
- Dron, Tony (February 1996). Coucher, Robert (ed.). "Great British Sports Cars: Allard". Thoroughbred & Classic Cars. 23 (5). London UK: IPC Magazines: 54–62. ISSN 0143-7267.
- Falconer, Tom (2007). Original Corvette, 1953-62: The Restorers Guide. St. Paul, MN USA: MBI Publishing. ISBN 1 870979 90 7.
- Gulett, Mike (2011). European Style with American Muscle. ISBN 978-1-257-90496-9.
- Mort, Norm (2009). "Anglo-American Cars of the 1950s". Anglo-American Cars: From the 1930s to The 1970s. Dorchester UK: Veloce Publishing. ISBN 978-1-845842-33-8.
- Wood, Jonathan (2003). Ultimate History of Fast cars. Parragon Publishing. pp. 32–33. ISBN 1-40541-593-2.
