= Genovation Cars =

- Headquarters: Maryland, US
- Key people: Andrew Saul
- Website: genovationcars.com

Genovation Cars is an American automobile manufacturer based in Maryland. The company takes well-known production vehicles such as the 2006 Corvette Z06, removing the drivetrain and fuel tank and replacing them with electronic motors and 44kWh batteries. Its current model, the GXE is an acronym for Genovation Extreme Electric Car.

== History ==
The company began buying petrol-engine cars in good condition, installing a dual-motor power-train and selling them.

Early Genovation projects involved electrifying the Ford Focus for fleet operations and developing the GSL, an electric version of the first-generation Mercedes SL.

Genovation's GXE is an electric vehicle modified from a 2006 Corvette Z06. The Corvette's gasoline engine was replaced with dual, liquid-cooled electric motors. These motors generate at least 700 hp and 600 lb-ft of torque, whereas ' original Corvette V8 engine produced around 505 hp and 400 lb-ft of torque. It uses a 44kWh battery pack, giving it a 130-mile range under normal conditions.

The GXE's front-mounted twin electric motors, produce 789 bhp from around 700 lb-ft of torque. These motors use dual inverters. The car uses a drivetrain that emulates the Corvette's feel.

The GXE set a new electric vehicle speed record of 210.2 mph at the Bohmer Proving Grounds in Merritt Island, Florida.

The GXE is a modified version of the C7 Grand Sport Corvette. It has an 800-horsepower powertrain powered by two electric motors and five battery packs. The vehicle comes with a seven-speed manual transmission or an eight-speed automatic gearbox.
