= M194 =

M194 may refer to:

- M-194 (Michigan highway), a state highway in Michigan
- Mercedes-Benz M194 engine, an automobile engine
- Minardi M194, a Formula One race car
