= Mercedes-Benz SL-Class =

Mercedes-Benz SL
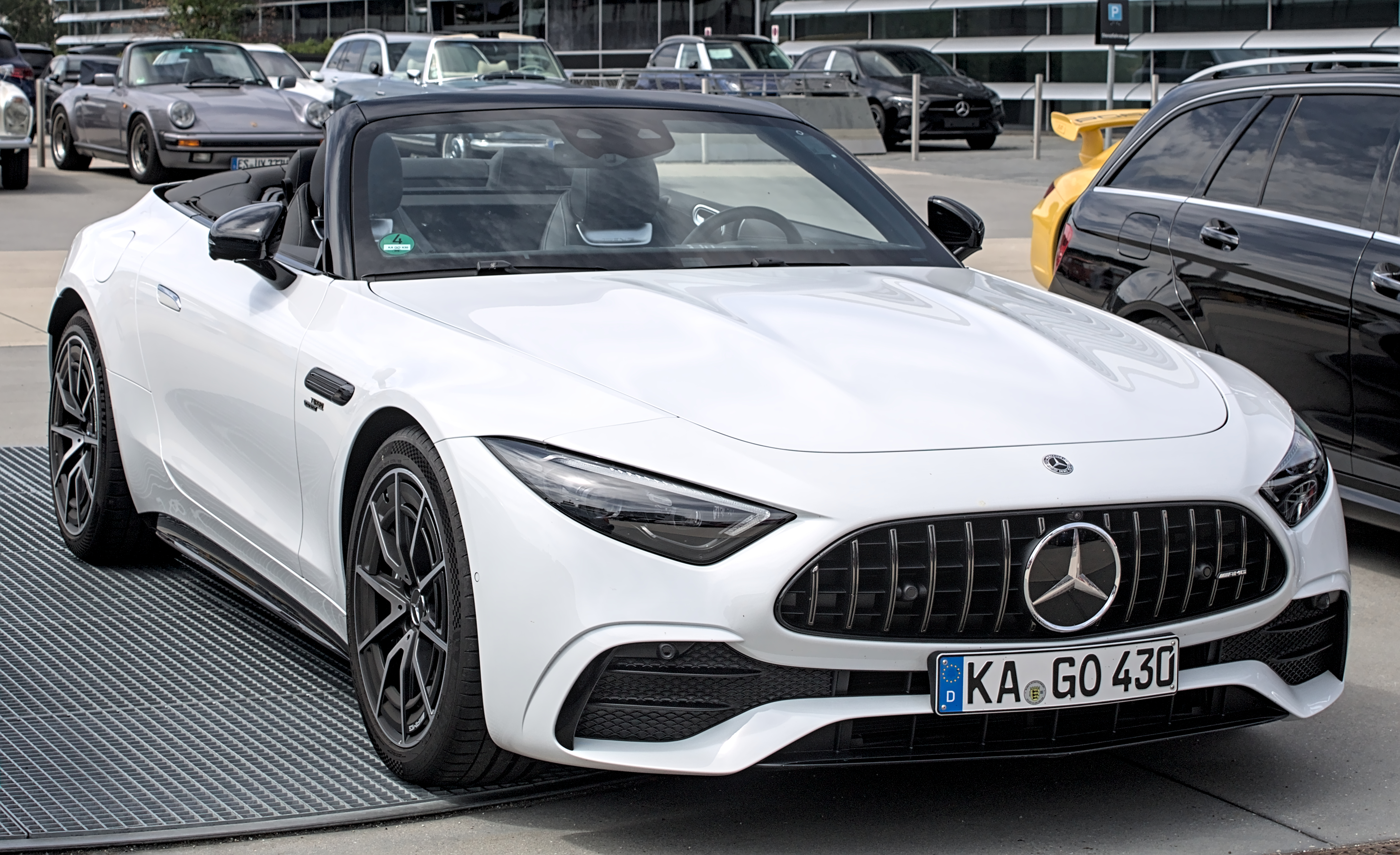
- Mercedes-Benz SL43 (R232)

Overview
- Manufacturer: Daimler-Benz (1954–1998); DaimlerChrysler (1998–2007); Daimler AG (2007–2020); Mercedes-Benz Group (2022–present)
- Also called: Mercedes-AMG SL (2022–present)
- Production: 1954–present
- Assembly: West Germany: Stuttgart-Untertürkheim, (Mercedes-Benz Werk Untertürkheim; 1954–1963); Stuttgart-Sindelfingen (Mercedes-Benz Plant Sindelfingen; 1963–1989); Germany: Bremen (Mercedes-Benz Werk; 1989–present); South Africa: East London (Mercedes-Benz Greenfields)

Body and chassis
- Class: Sports car/Grand tourer (S)
- Body style: 2-door coupé; 2-door roadster
- Layout: Front-engine, rear-wheel-drive (1954–2021, SL43; 2022–present); Front-engine, all-wheel-drive (4matic, 2022–present)

Chronology
- Predecessor: Mercedes-Benz SSK; Mercedes-Benz 540K

The Mercedes-Benz SL-Class (marketed as Mercedes-AMG SL since 2022) is a grand touring sports car manufactured by Mercedes-Benz since 1954. The designation "SL" derives from the German term "Super-Leicht", which translates to "Super Light" in English.

Initially, the first 300 SL was a racing sports car built in 1952 with no intention of developing a street version. In 1954, an American importer Max Hoffman suggested the street version of 300 SL for the wealthy performance car enthusiasts in the United States where the market for the personal luxury car was booming after the Second World War.

== Abbreviation of SL ==
Whether the abbreviation SL was derived from a 1931 Mercedes-Benz SSKL (Super Sport Kurz Leicht—Super Sport Short Light) isn't known. At the public introduction of 300 SL in 1952, Mercedes-Benz did not define the abbreviation SL.

The German magazine, Auto Motor und Sport, declared in its 2012 special edition issue of Mercedes-Benz SL that Rudolf Uhlenhaut—in his notarised letter—indicated the abbreviation meant Super Leicht. This contradicted with the abbreviation proposed by Engelen, Riedner, and Seufert who worked with Rudolf Uhlenhaut: they indicated the abbreviation means Sport Leicht. On 15 March 2021, Auto Motor und Sport published a photocopy of an undated "Informations-Unterlage" (press release) from 1952 in its issue, showing the definition of SL as super-leicht.

Mercedes-Benz used Sport Leicht and Super Leicht interchangeably until 2017 when a chance discovery in its corporate archive clarified the abbreviation stood for "Super Leicht".

According to the German definition, Leicht means light (as in weight, amount, and feeling, for instance) or easy (as in little effort). For this abbreviation in English language, the definition light is used.

== W198 and W121 (1954–1963) ==
First generation
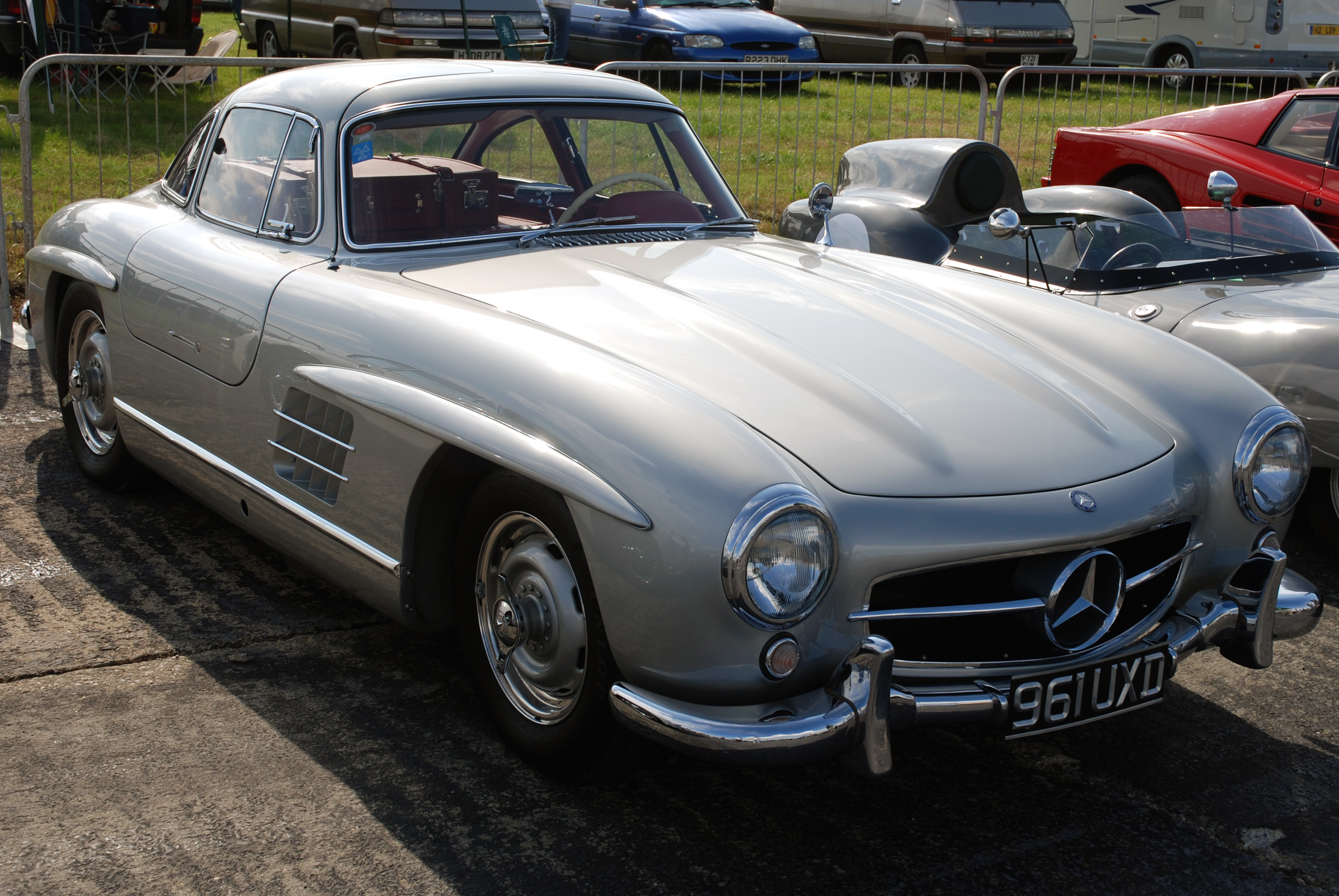
- Mercedes-Benz 300 SL (W198)

Overview
- Production: 1954–1963

Body and chassis
- Platform: Mercedes-Benz W121 BII (190 SL); Mercedes-Benz W198 (300 SL)

Powertrain
- Engine: Petrol: 1.9 L I4; 3.0 L M198 I6
- Transmission: 4-speed manual

Dimensions
- Wheelbase: 2,400 mm (94.5 in)
- Length: 4,520 mm (178.0 in)
- Width: 1,790 mm (70.5 in)
- Height: 1,300 mm (51.2 in)

The 300 SL was a road-going version of the W194 racing car with extensive modifications to the body. The 300 SL in coupé form was introduced in 1954, featuring its trademark gullwing doors. In 1957, the roadster succeeded the coupé and had the larger conventional passenger doors and larger form-fitting headlamps and was in production until 1963.

In 1955, the smaller 190 SL presented an attractive, more affordable alternative to the exclusive Mercedes-Benz 300 SL, sharing its basic styling, engineering, detailing, and fully independent suspension. Both cars had double wishbones in front and swing axles at the rear. Instead of the 300 SL's expensive purpose-built W198 tubular spaceframe, the 190 SL used a shortened unitary floorpan modified from the W121 base saloon. A 1.9-litre four-cylinder in-line engine was used instead of the 300 SL's engine.

Both the 300 SL roadster and 190 SL have a soft fabric folding top and an optional removable hardtop. The production for 300 SL and 190 SL ended in 1963 with the introduction of the W113 SL-Class.

=== Model range ===
- 300 SL (Gullwing): 1954–1957, 3.0 L I6
- 300 SL (Roadster): 1957–1963, 3.0 L I6
- 190 SL: 1955–1963, 1.9 L I4
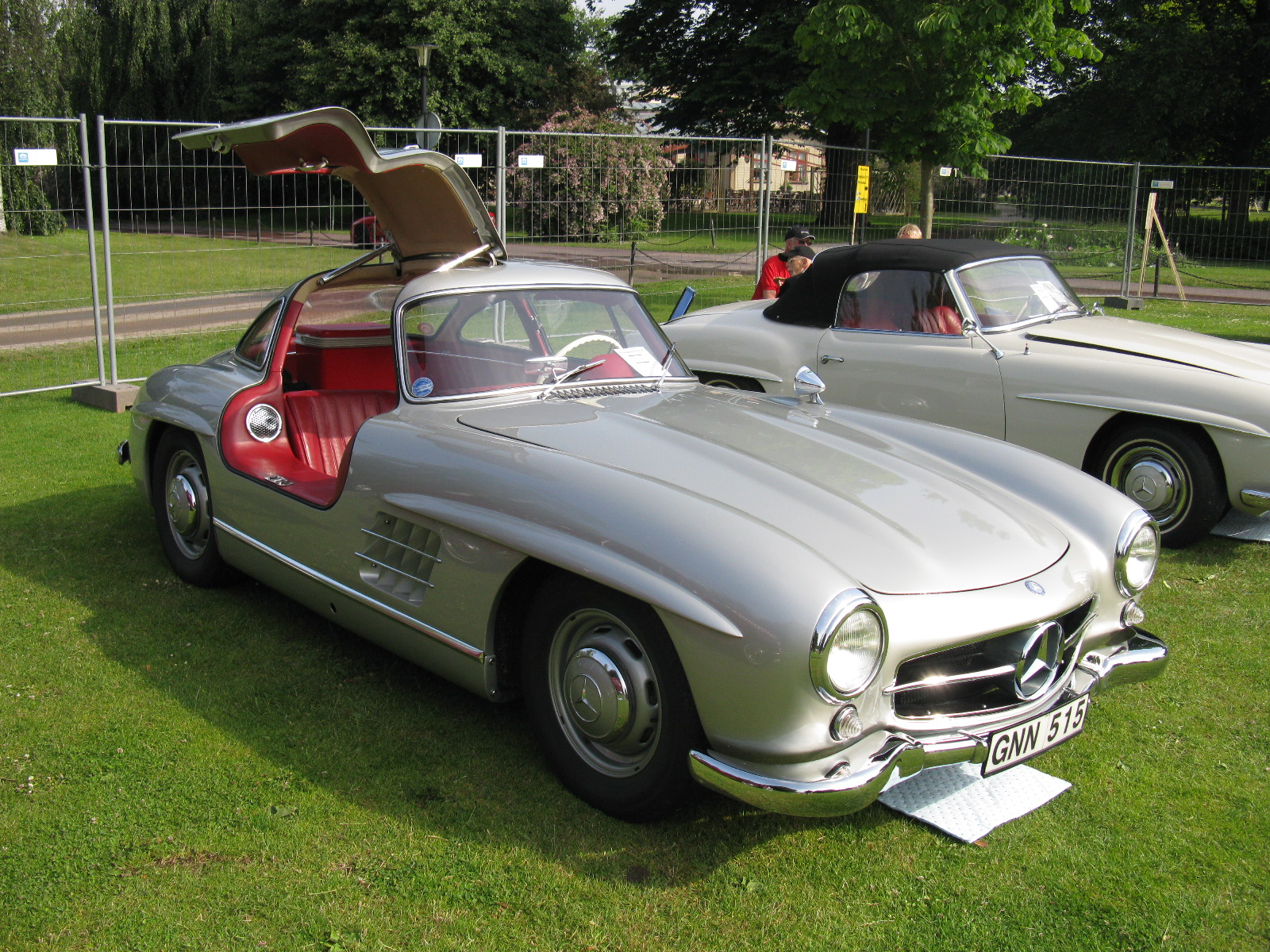
Mercedes Benz 300 SL (W198)

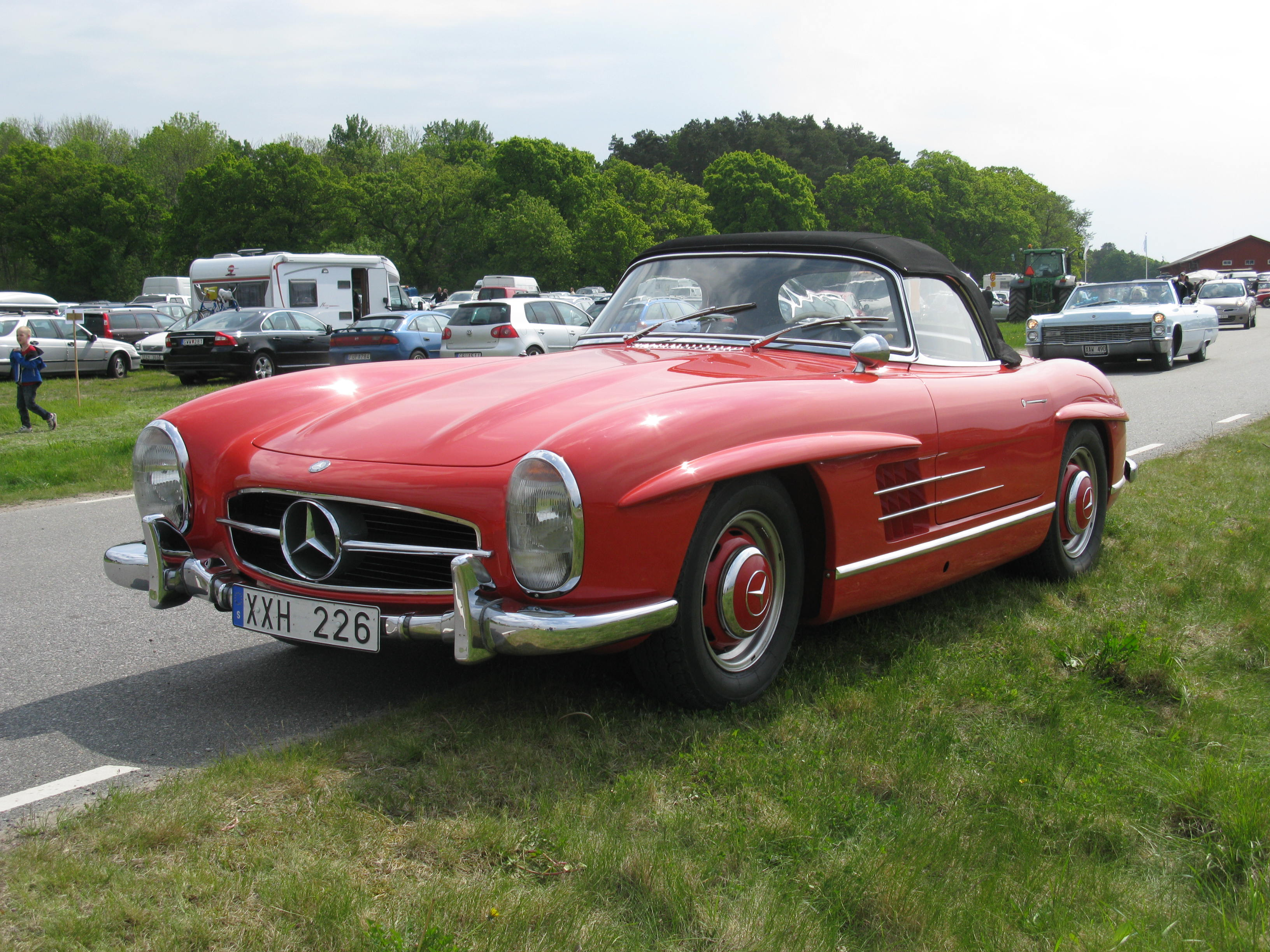
Mercedes Benz 300 SL Roadster (W198)

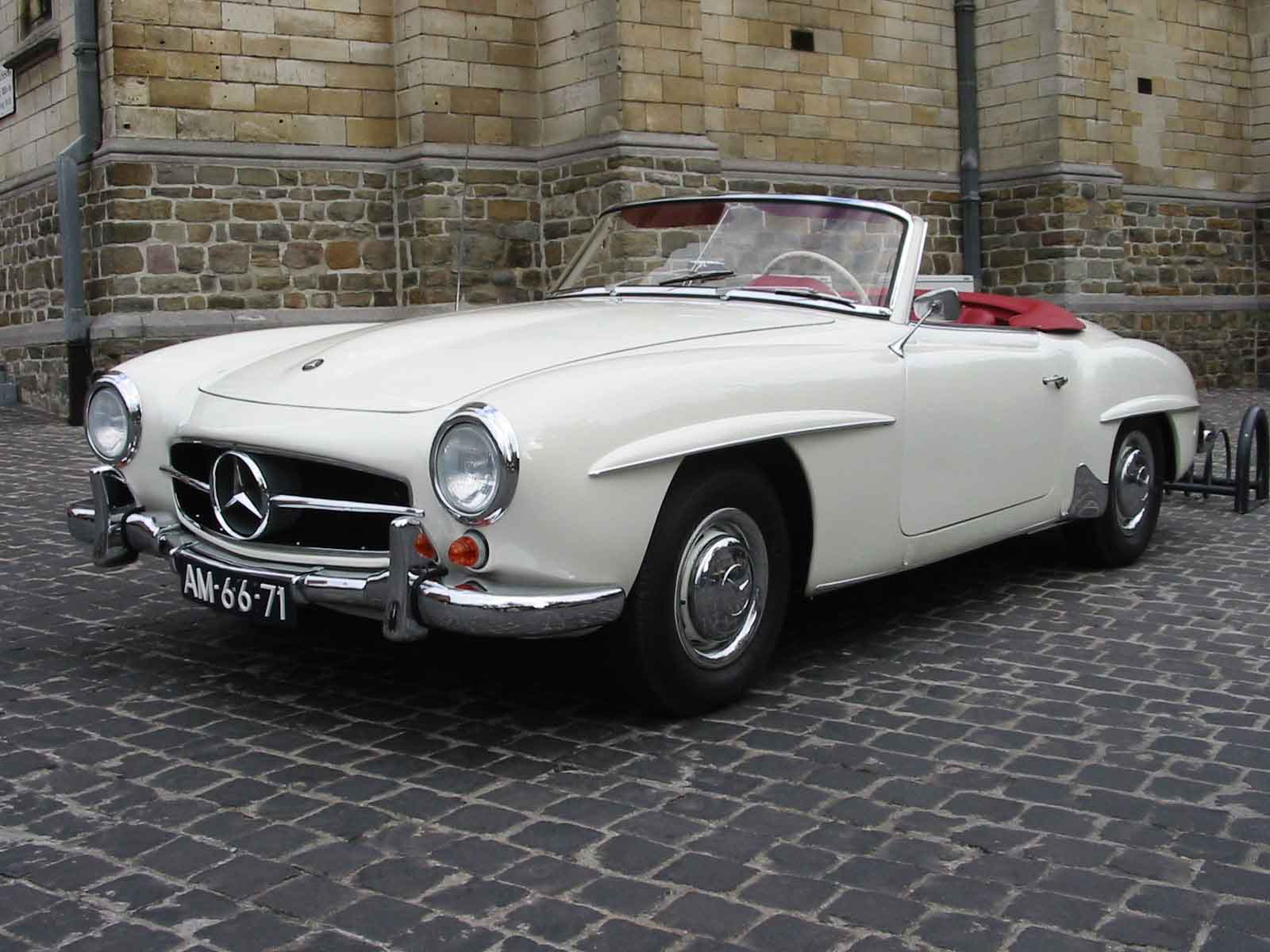
Mercedes Benz 190 SL (W121)

== W113 (1963–1971) ==
Second generation
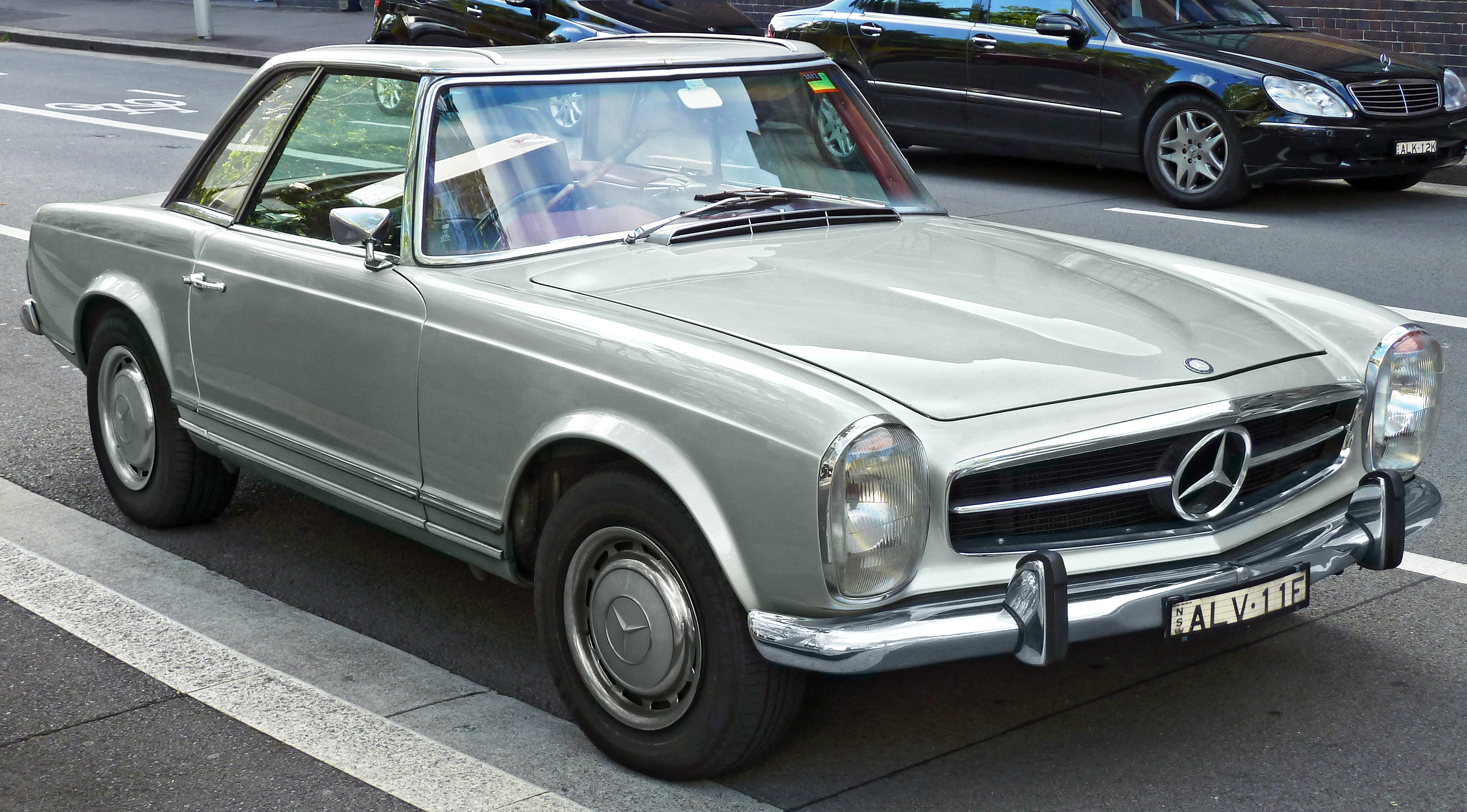

Overview
- Production: 1963–1971
- Designer: Paul Bracq; Béla Barényi; Friedrich Geiger

Body and chassis
- Platform: Mercedes-Benz W113

Powertrain
- Engine: Petrol: 2.3 L I6; 2.5 L I6; 2.8 L I6
- Transmission: 4-speed manual; 5-speed manual; 4-speed automatic

Dimensions
- Length: 4,285 mm (168.7 in)
- Width: 1,760 mm (69.3 in)
- Height: 1,305 mm (51.4 in)

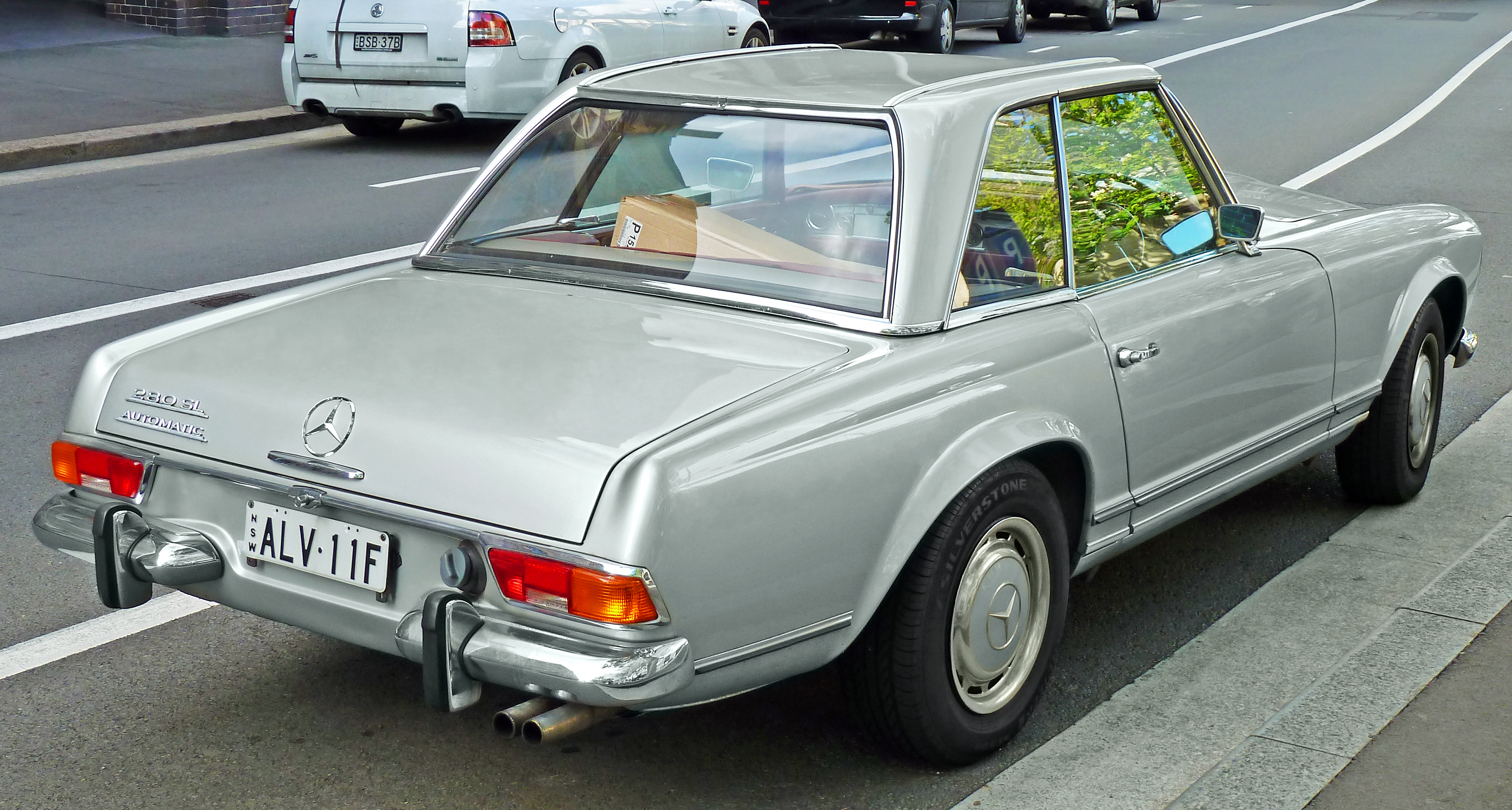
1969 Mercedes-Benz 280 SL roadster (Australia)

Replacing both the 300 SL and 190 SL, the 230 SL was introduced in 1963 with a distinctive concave roofline that earned the nickname "pagoda top". The W113 featured a low waistline, large curved greenhouse windows, detachtable hardtop, and a new 2.3-litre straight-six engine.

For 1967, the engine was enlarged to 2.5 litres, and 230 SL was renamed as 250 SL. The changes were made to the interior with new dashboard padding, switches and knobs, steering wheel, and door pockets (US model only). The wheel covers fitted to 250 SL and 280 SL replaced the smaller hubcaps. A year later in 1968, the engine was enlarged again to 2.8 litres, and the 250 SL was changed to 280 SL.

=== Model range ===
- 230 SL: 1963–1967, 2.3 L I6
- 250 SL: 1967–1968, 2.5 L I6
- 280 SL: 1968–1971, 2.8 L I6

== R107 (1971–1989) ==
Third generation
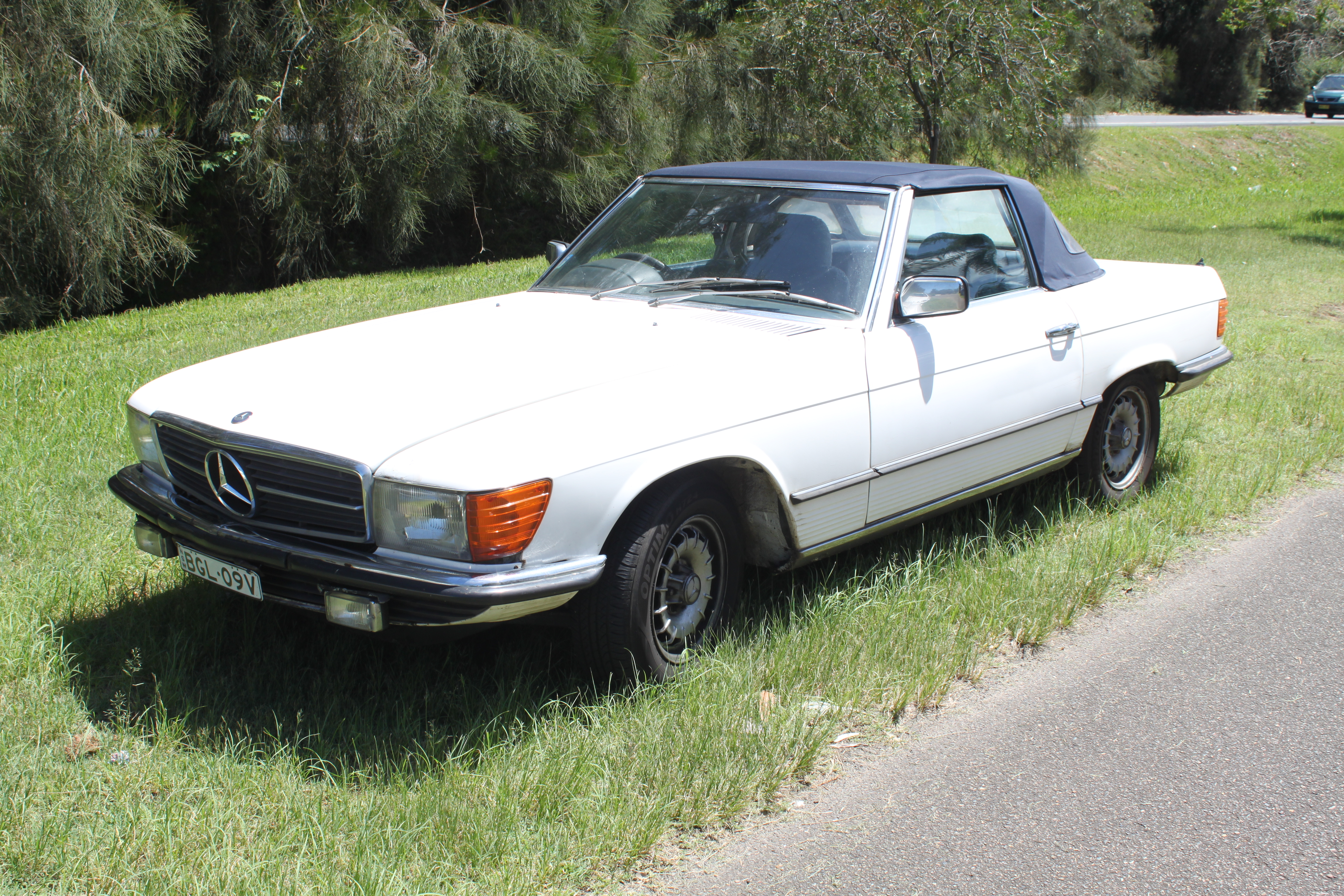

Overview
- Production: 1971–1989

Body and chassis
- Platform: Mercedes-Benz R107 and C107

Powertrain
- Engine: Petrol: 2.8 L I6; 3.0 L I6; 3.5 L V8; 3.8 L V8; 4.2 L V8; 4.5 L V8; 5.0 L V8; 5.6 L V8
- Transmission: 4-speed manual; 5-speed manual; 3-speed automatic; 4-speed automatic

Dimensions
- Wheelbase: 96.7 in (2,456 mm)
- Length: 180.3 in (4,580 mm)
- Width: 70.5 in (1,791 mm)
- Height: 51.1 in (1,298 mm)

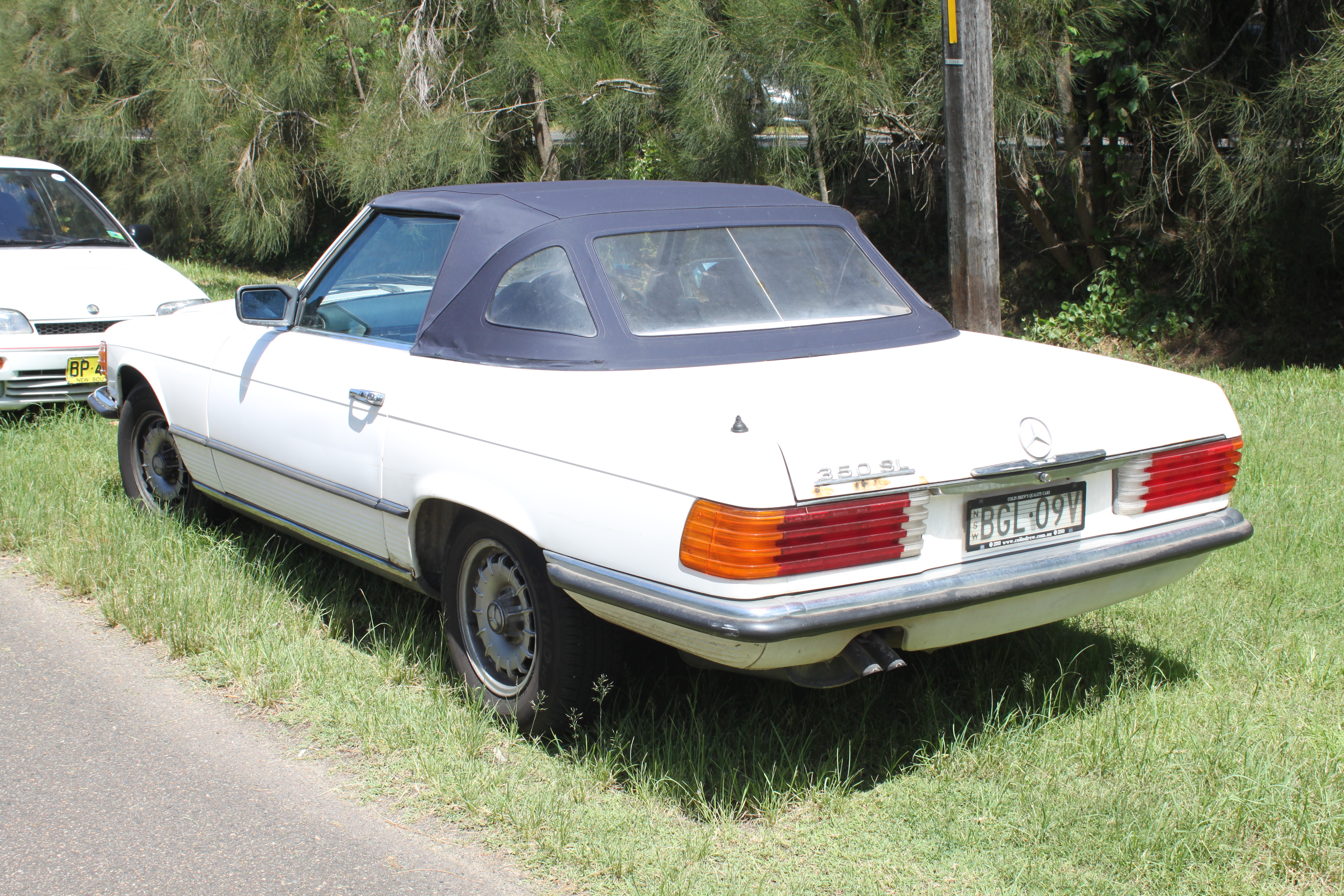
Mercedes-Benz 350 SL roadster (Australia)

In 1971, R107 was introduced with new design language and safety features that spread to the subsequent Mercedes-Benz models. For the first time, the V8 engines were fitted to the SL-Class. With the production from 1971 to 1989, R107 was one of few longest-produced vehicles from Mercedes-Benz. R107 received a very minor update in 1972 with new rubber-edged wing mirrors from W116 and a major update in 1985 for 1986 model year. The engine options were updated in 1980 for the 1981 model year with new aluminium V8 engines from W126 S-Class introduced in 1979 while the 2.8-litre six-cylinder in-line engine carried over. It was updated again in 1985 for the 1986 model year with new 3.0-litre six-cylinder in-line engine from W124 and enlarged 4.2- and 5.5-litre V8 engines while the 5.0-litre V8 engine carried over.

The SLC Coupe is much rarer, produced from 1971 – 1981, as 280, 350, 380 and 450 SLC. With the 450 SLC, 450 SLC 5.0 and 500 SLC models, Daimler-Benz took part in major rallies at the end of the 1970s such as the 30,000 km long Vuelta à la America del Sud (1977), the Safari Rally (1979) and the Bandama Rally.

The R107 received its first update in 1985 with deeper front air dam, revised brake system with larger discs and four piston calipers, driver's side airbag (standard for US market and extra-cost option for the European market), and, for the European market, catalysator option. The 5-mph bumpers and four round sealed-beam headlamps fitted to the US models remained unchanged despite the revised US FMVSS regulations that allowed the 2.5-mph bumpers and form-fitting headlamps, starting with 1982 and 1983 model years respectively. The US model received the third brake lamp mounted on the trunk in 1986.

The 560 SL was sold in the United States, Canada, Japan, and Australia only.

=== Model range ===
- 280 SL: 1974–1985, 2.8 L I6
- 300 SL: 1986–1989, 3.0 L I6
- 350 SL: 1971–1980, 3.5 L V8
- 350 SL (4.5): 1972, 4.5 L V8 (exclusive for the US market)
- 380 SL: 1981–1985, 3.8 L V8
- 420 SL: 1986–1989, 4.2 L V8
- 450 SL: 1973–1980, 4.5 L V8
- 500 SL: 1981–1989, 5.0 L V8
- 560 SL: 1986–1989, 5.5 L V8

== R129 (1989–2001) ==
Fourth generation
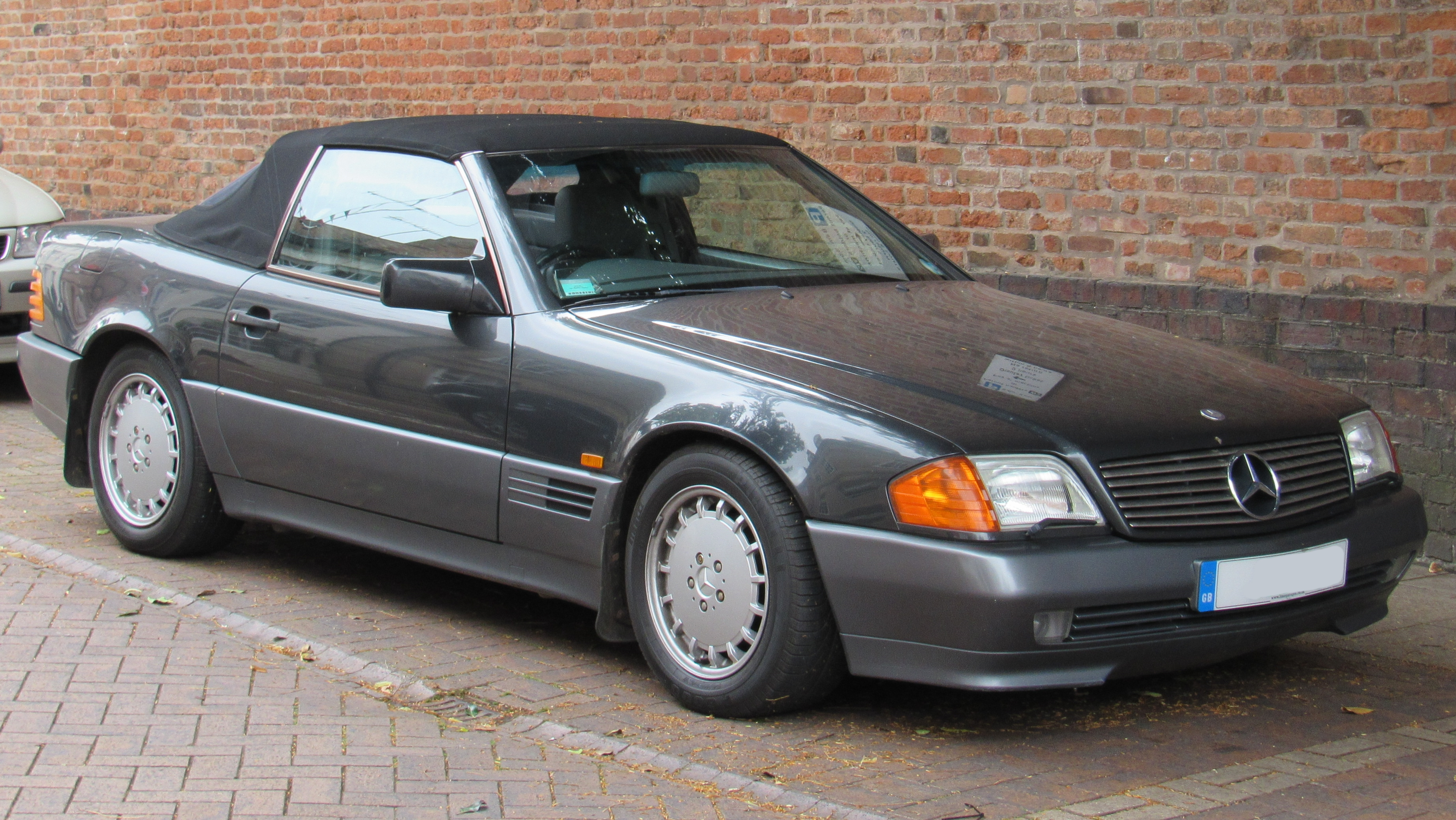

Overview
- Production: 1989–2001

Body and chassis
- Platform: Mercedes-Benz R129

Powertrain
- Engine: Petrol: 2.8 L I6; 2.8 L 204 hp (152 kW) V6; 3.0 L 190 hp (142 kW) I6; 3.0 L 231 hp (172 kW) I6; 3.2 L 231 hp (172 kW) I6; 3.2 L 224 hp (167 kW) V6; 5.0 L 326 hp (243 kW) V8; 5.0 L 306 hp (228 kW) V8; 5.4 L 354 hp (264 kW) V8; 6.0 L 381 hp (284 kW) V8; 6.0 L 394 hp (294 kW) V12; 7.0 L 496 hp (370 kW) V12; 7.3 L 518 hp (386 kW) V12
- Transmission: 5-speed manual; 4-speed automatic; 5-speed automatic

Dimensions
- Wheelbase: 99.0 in (2,515 mm)
- Length: 1997–2002: 177.1 in (4,498 mm); 1989–1996: 176.0 in (4,470 mm); 1992–96 V12: 178.0 in (4,521 mm)
- Width: 71.3 in (1,811 mm)
- Height: 1992–2002: 51.3 in (1,303 mm); 1989–1991: 50.7 in (1,288 mm)

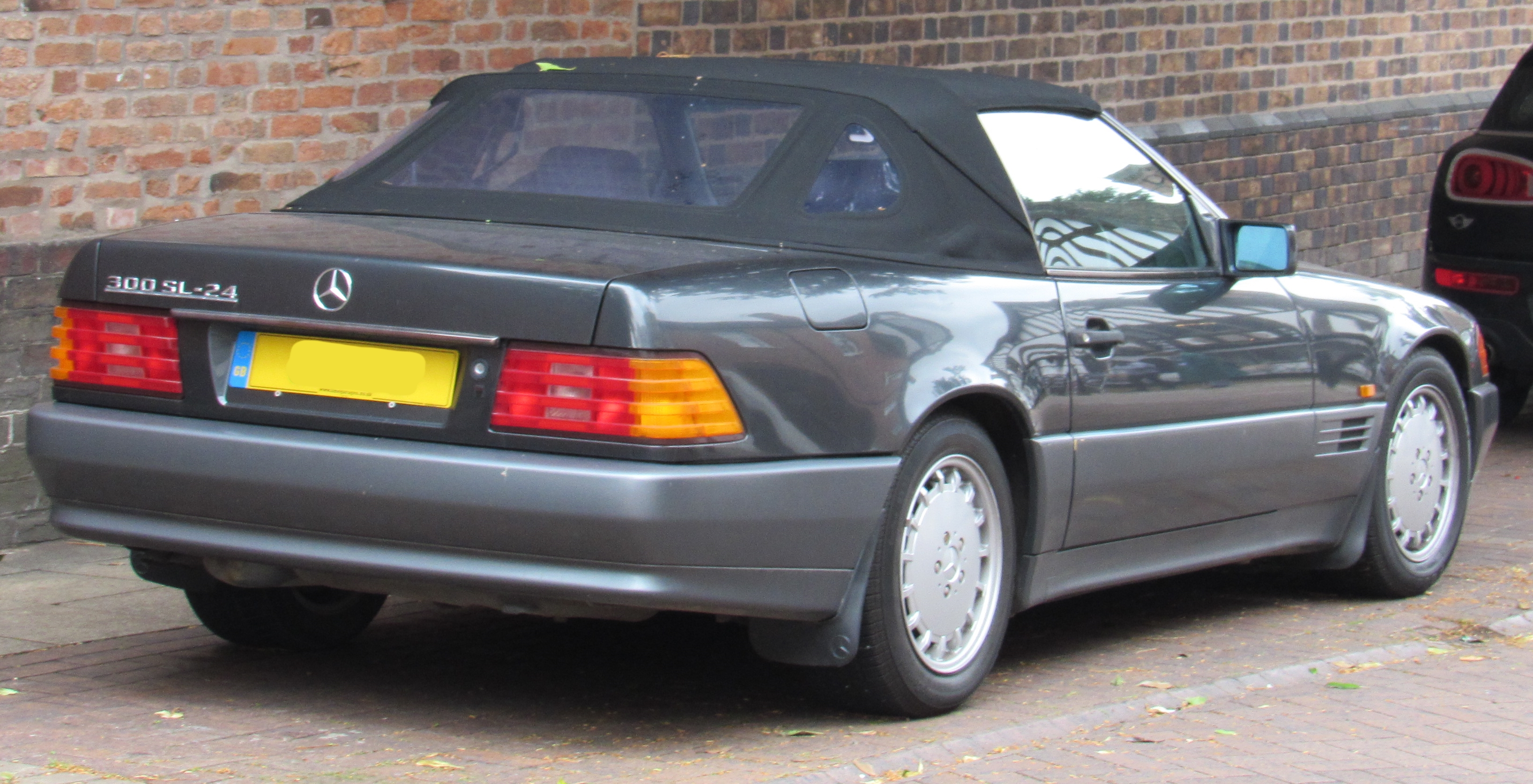
Mercedes-Benz SL 320 (UK)

The R129 was introduced in 1989 as a two-passenger convertible with a removable hardtop — the first Mercedes to feature a fully automatic, hydraulically operated fabric convertible top; V8 and (later) V12 engines with four valves per cylinder; projector lens HID headlamps (introduced in 1995); and an automatic rollbar, which self-deployed in a rollover event. The retractable rollbar could also be raised or lowered manually using a switch on the console, and facilitated occupant safety without compromising aesthetics. In 1992, R129 was the first SL-Class to offer a V12 engine (600 SL/SL 600) and to have official AMG variants (500 SL 6.0 AMG, SL 60 AMG (V8), SL 70 AMG (V12), SL 73 AMG (V12), and then SL 55 AMG (V8)). The R129 was the last SL-Class offered with a manual gearbox.

For the US market, R129 was the first SL-Class offered with six-cylinder in-line engine from 300 SL-24 (named as 300SL) since the 1971. For 1995, a larger 3.2-litre engine was introduced in the SL 320, subsequently dropped from the US market in 1998.

The 1994 R129 introduced a minor cosmetic and technical updates; revised engine optionals; as well as a new nomenclature. The 3.0-litre in-line six engines, initially fitted with 12-valve (300 SL) and 24-valve (300 SL-24) heads, was revised to one engine in two displacements (2.8 and 3.2 litres) with both utilizing a 24-valve head. The V8 and V12 were carried over with no changes. 300 SL and 300 SL-24 became SL 280 and SL 320 while 500 SL and 600 SL were renamed as SL 500 and SL 600.

In 1998, R129 received the major cosmetic and technical updates with revised engines to include the V6, V8, and V12 engines from the new W220 S-Class. All of those updated engines had three valves and two spark plugs per cylinder.

=== Model range ===
- SL 280: (1993–2001), 2.8 L I6
- SL 280: (1998–2001), 2.8 L V6
- 300 SL: (1989–1993), 3.0 L I6
- 300 SL-24: (1989–1993), 3.0 L I6
- SL 320: (1993–1998), 3.2 L I6
- SL 320: (1998–2001), 3.2 L V6
- 500 SL: (1989–1993), 5.0 L V8
- 500 SL 6.0 AMG: (1991–1992), 6.0 L V8
- SL 500: (1993–1998), 5.0 L V8
- SL 55 AMG: (1999–2001), 5.4 L V8
- 600 SL: (1992–1993), 6.0 L V12
- SL 600: (1993–2001), 6.0 L V12
- SL 60 AMG: (1993–1998), 6.0 L V8
- SL 70 AMG: (1998–2001), 7.0 L V12
- SL 73 AMG: (1995 and 1998–2001), 7.3 L V12

== R230 (2000–2011) ==
Fifth generation
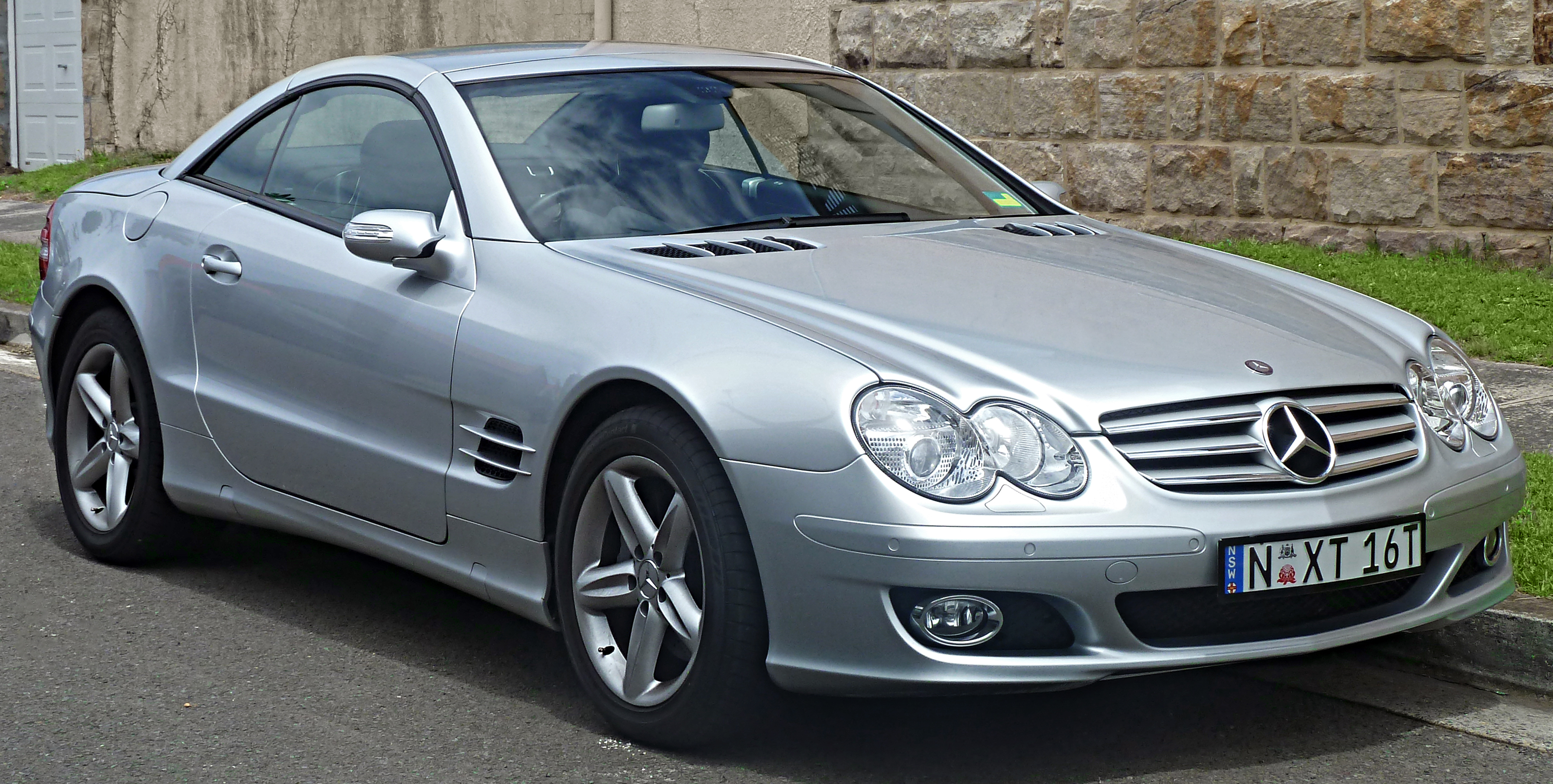
- 2006 facelift SL 350 (RHD; Australia)

Overview
- Production: 2001–2011

Body and chassis
- Platform: Mercedes-Benz R230

Powertrain
- Engine: Petrol: 3.0 L 170 kW (228 hp) V6; 3.5 L 200–232 kW (268–311 hp) V6; 3.7 L 180 kW (241 hp) V6; 5.0 L 225–285 kW (302–382 hp) V8; 5.4 L 350–380 kW (469–510 hp) Supercharged V8; 5.5 L 285 kW (382 hp) V8; 5.5 L 368–380 kW (493–510 hp) BiTurbo V12; 6.0 L 368–493 kW (493–661 hp) BiTurbo V12; 6.2 L 386 kW (518 hp) V8
- Transmission: 5-speed automatic; 7-speed automatic

Dimensions
- Wheelbase: 100.8 in (2,560 mm)
- Length: 178.5 in (4,534 mm)
- Width: 2005–07: 71.5 in (1,816 mm); 2002–04: 72.0 in (1,829 mm)
- Height: 51.0 in (1,295 mm)

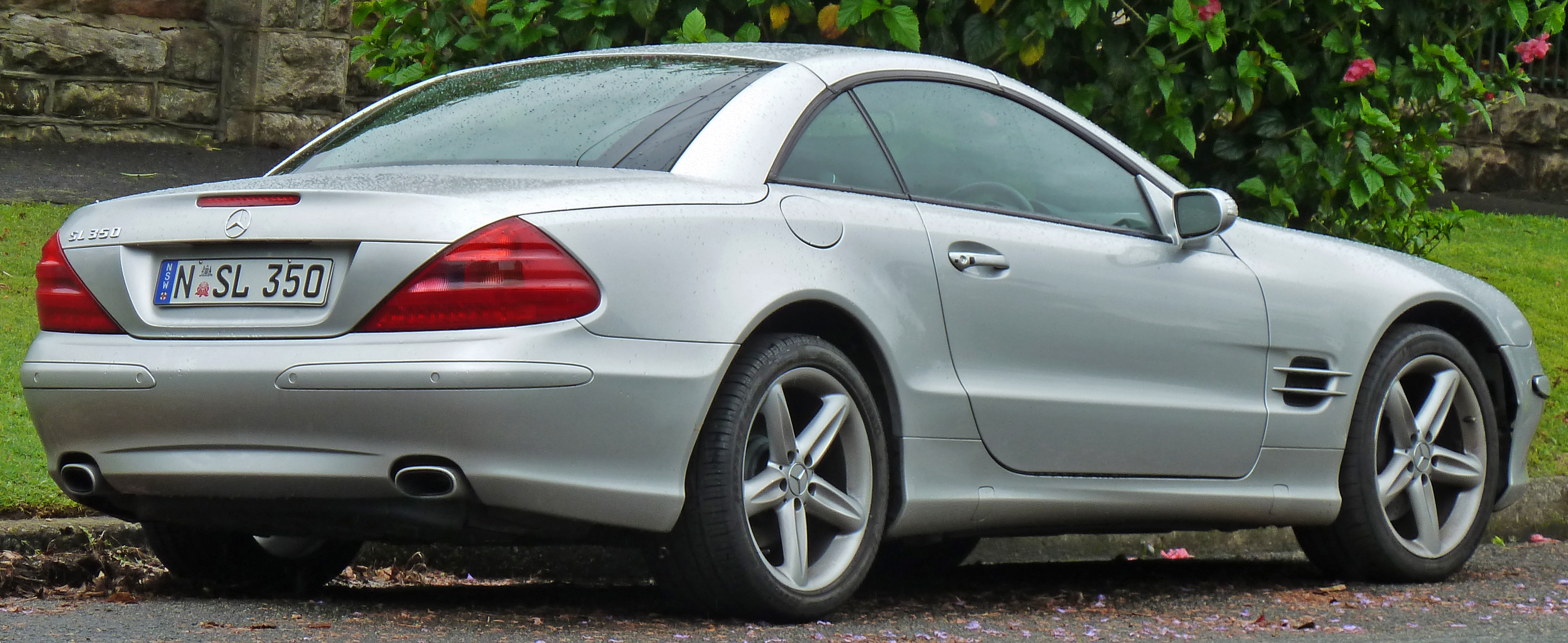
Mercedes-Benz SL 350 roadster (Australia)

The R230, introduced in 2001, continues the evolution of R129 with smoother body design and new peanut-shaped headlamp design. The fifth-generation SL-Class featured a 'Vario Roof' retractable hardtop, as introduced on the 1996 SLK Class: Active Body Control (ABC) active suspension system, Keyless Go keyless entry and smart key, and Sensotronic Brake Control (SBC) electro-hydraulic power brake system. The SBC proved troublesome, and was later disabled by Mercedes-Benz in a large recall campaign due to the difficulties in modulating the brake effort.

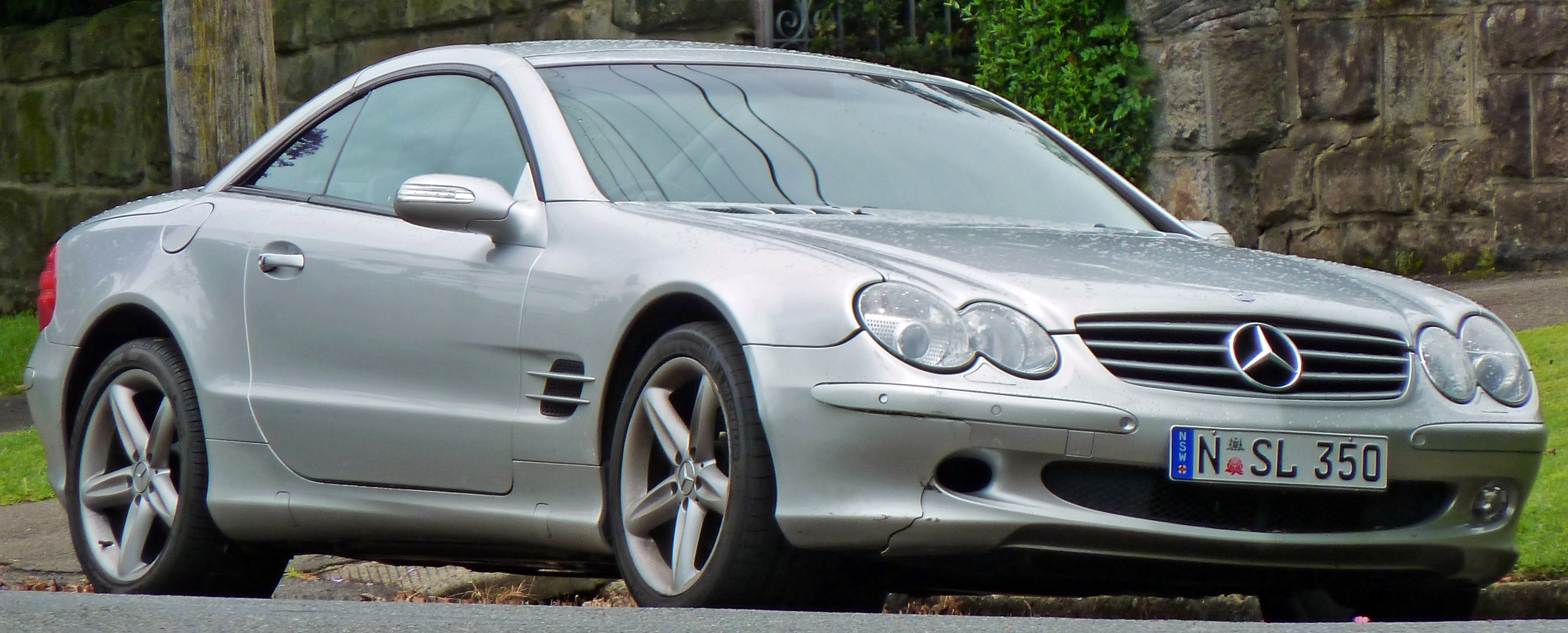
2004 pre-facelift SL 350

In 2006, R230 received a minor cosmetic update and revised engine options.

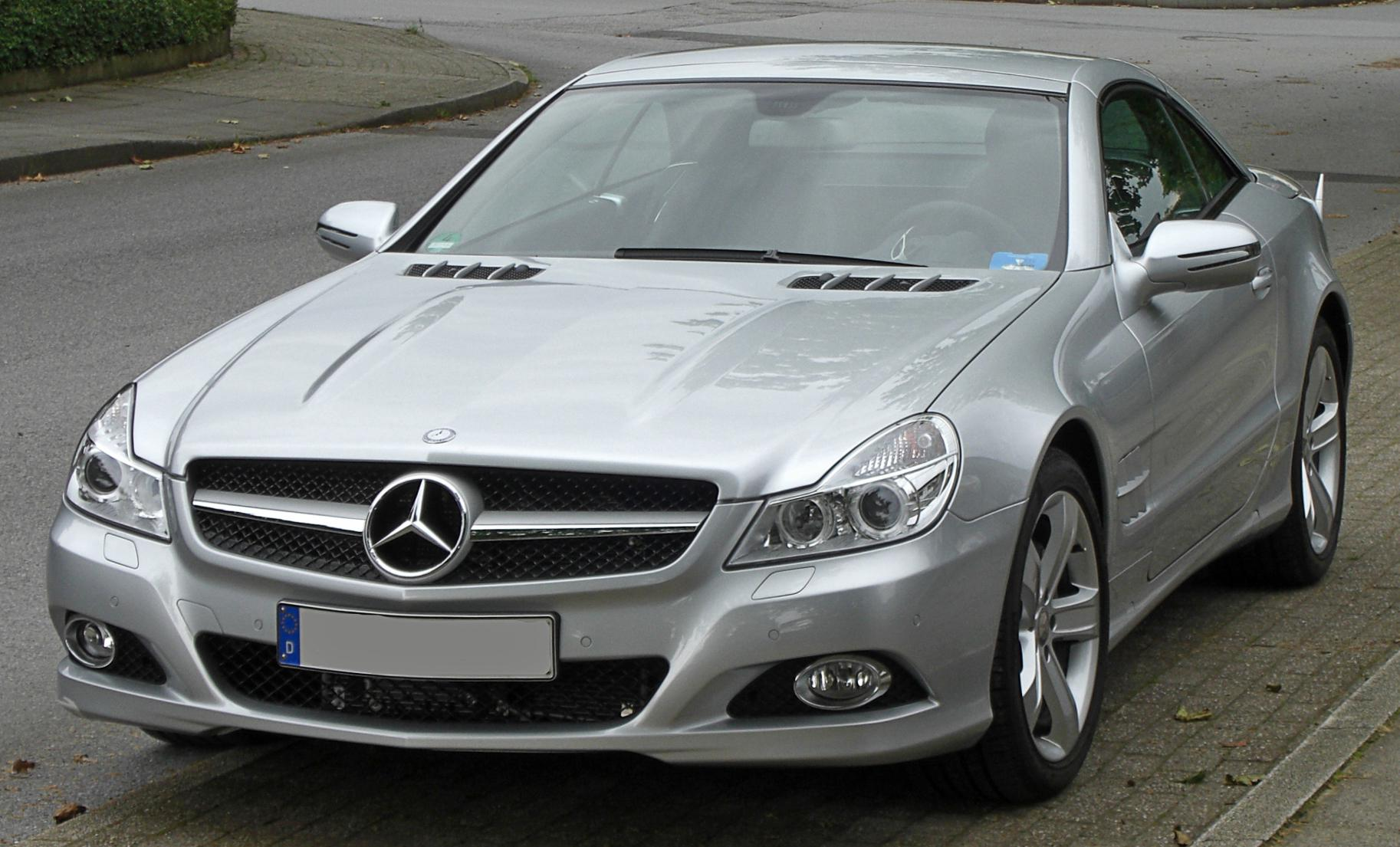
2008 facelift Mercedes SL front

The R230 SL underwent a significant facelift in 2008 featuring new and revised engines and a new front end that evokes the classic 300 SL with a large grille featuring a prominent 3-pointed star and twin "power domes" on the bonnet, the car also features new headlights with an optional "Intelligent Light System" and a new speed sensitive steering system. The SL 63 AMG replaced the SL 55 AMG. A high-performance version of R230, SL 65 AMG Black Series, was offered as a coupe only body type. A total of 169,433 SL R230s were ever produced. The most common model is SL500 (~100,000 units). The rarest is SL65 AMG with only 3,055 units (350 of which SL65 AMG Black Series).

=== Model range ===
- SL 280: (2008–2009), 3.0 L V6
- SL 300: (2009–2011), 3.0 L V6
- SL 350 (3.7): (2003–2006), 3.7 L V6
- SL 350 (3.5): (2006–2011), 3.5 L V6
- SL 500 (5.0): (2001–2006), 5.0 L V8
- SL 500 (5.5): (2006–2011), 5.5 L V8, marketed as SL 550 exclusively in North America
- SL 55 AMG: (2001–2008), 5.4 L V8
- SL 600: (2002–2011), 5.5 L V12
- SL 63 AMG: (2008–2011), 6.2 L V8
- SL 65 AMG: (2004–2011), 6.0 L V12
- SL 65 AMG Black Series: (2008–2011), 6.0 L V12

== R231 (2011–2020) ==
Sixth generation
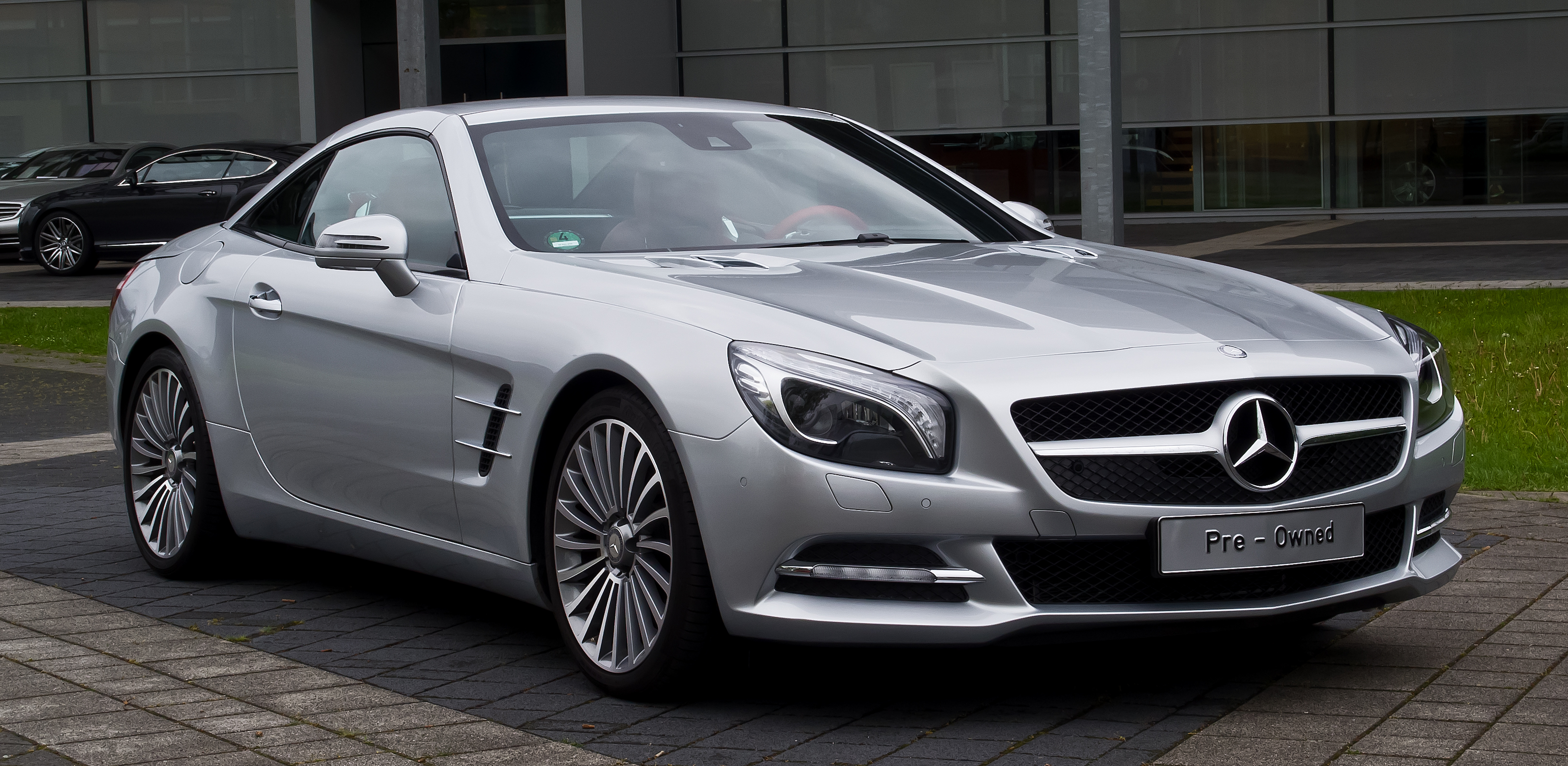

Overview
- Production: 2011–2020

Body and chassis
- Platform: Mercedes-Benz R231

Powertrain
- Engine: Petrol: 3.0 L 245–270 kW (329–362 hp) V6 Biturbo; 3.5 L 225 kW (302 hp) V6; 4.7 L 320–335 kW (429–449 hp) V8 Biturbo; 5.5 L 395–430 kW (530–577 hp) V8 Biturbo; 6.0 L 463 kW (621 hp) V12 Biturbo
- Transmission: 7-speed automatic; 9-speed automatic

Dimensions
- Wheelbase: 2,585 mm (101.8 in)
- Length: 4,612 mm (181.6 in)
- Width: 1,877 mm (73.9 in)
- Height: 1,315 mm (51.8 in)

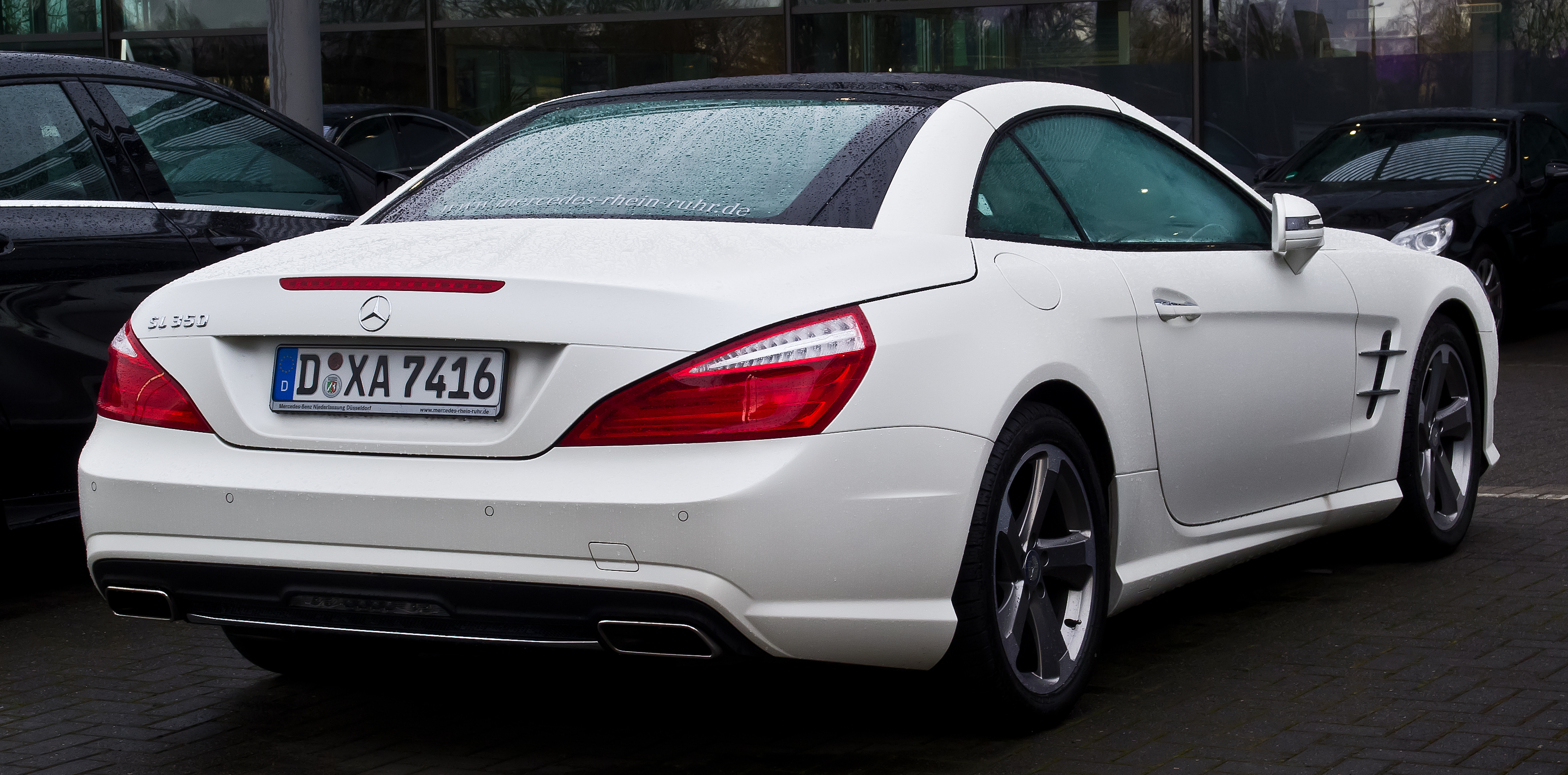
Mercedes-Benz SL 350 AMG Line (Germany)

Mercedes-Benz launched the sixth generation SL, internally designated R231, at the North American International Auto Show in January 2012. The R231 introduced aluminum bodywork, its weight advantage offset by higher safety and convenience equipment.

New features included a system marketed as 'FrontBass', which used space in the aluminium structure ahead of the front footwells as resonance spaces for the bass loudspeakers. Additionally, standard equipment included an adaptive windscreen wipe/wash system which supplied fluid from the wiper blade itself, as needed and depending on the direction of wipe. The R231 was available with two suspension systems: semi-active adjustable damping as standard and active suspension system ABC (Active Body Control) as an extra-cost option. Both types featured electro-mechanical, speed-sensitive power steering, which allowed the variable steering ratio across the steering wheel angle.

The R231 was longer and wider than its predecessor. Shoulder room is increased by 37 mm (1.5 in) and elbow room 28 mm (1.1 in).

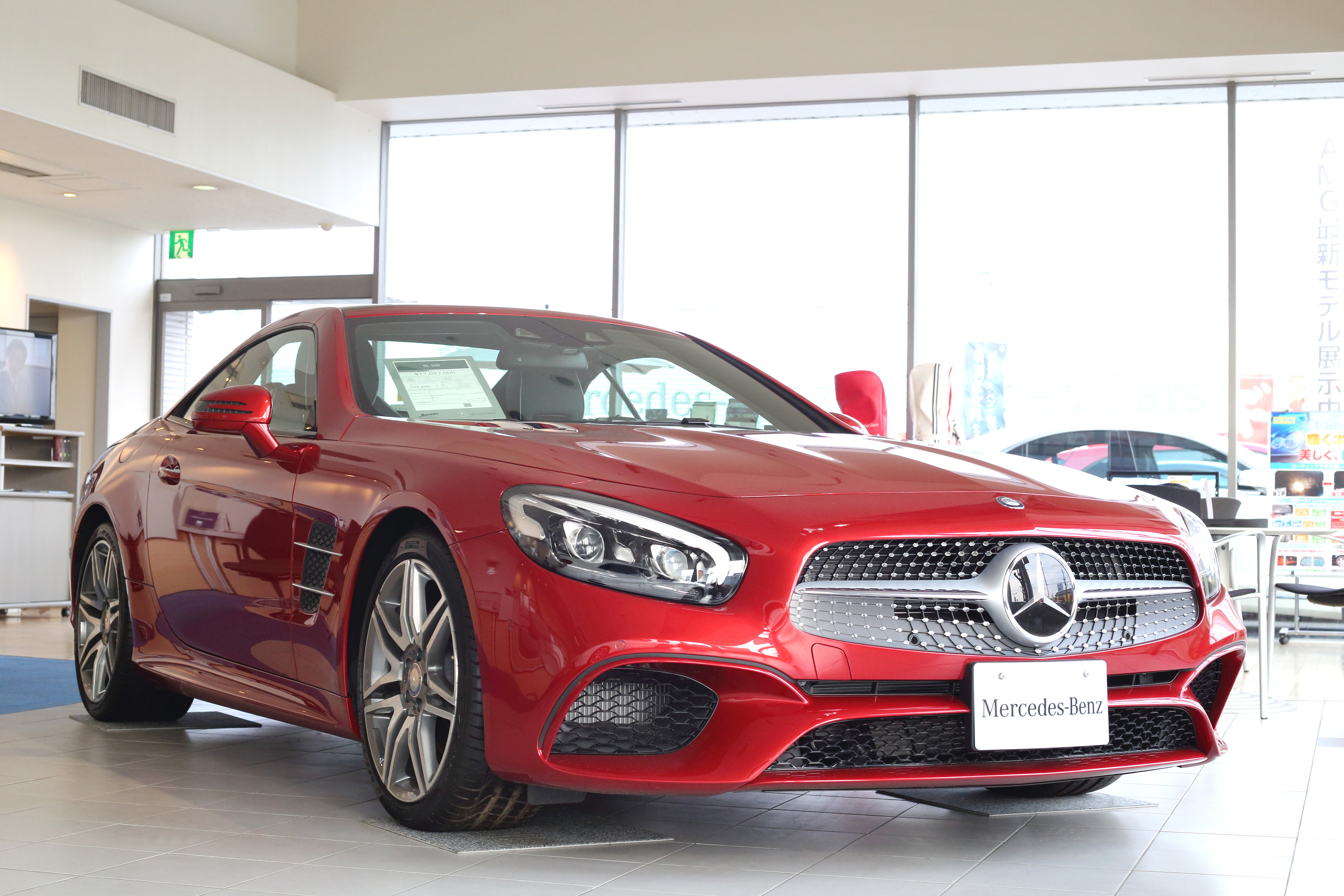

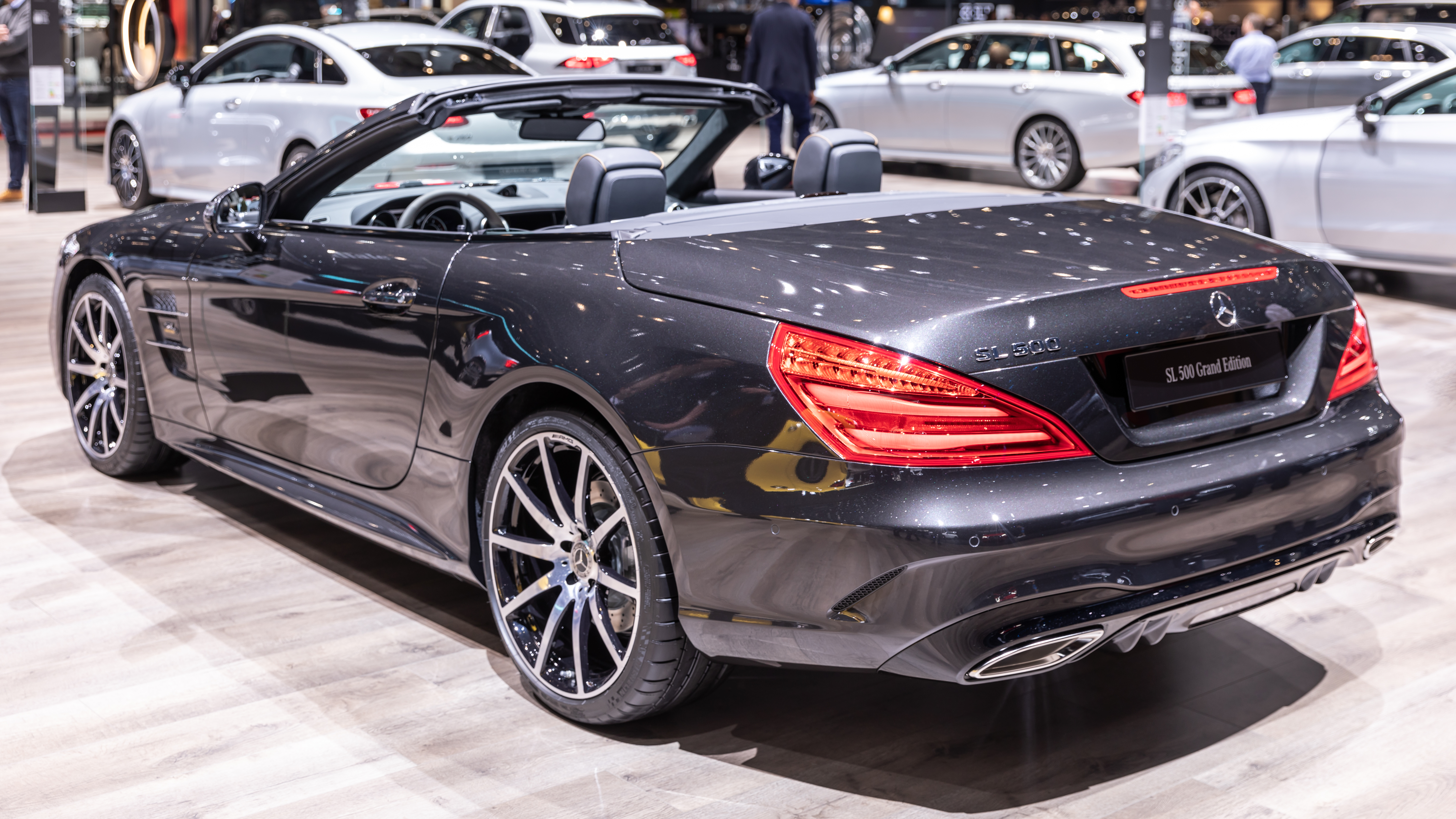

A mid-cycle update was introduced in 2016 for the 2017 model year along with revised engine and transmission options. A 9G-TRONIC Plus 9-speed automatic transmission was fitted to the SL-Class for the first time (SL 400/SL 450 and SL 500) while AMG SPEEDSHIFT MCT and AMG SPEEDSHIFT Plus 7G-TRONIC 7-speed automatic transmissions for SL 63 AMG and SL 65 AMG respectively remained unchanged. SL 350 was renamed as SL 400 (SL 450 for the North American market).

R231 had a revised front end, front grille treatment, and larger non-functional side 'vents' behind the front wheels. It also received adaptive LED front headlights with integrated daytime running lights and turn signals, leaving the below-bumper intake area free from lighting. The LED tail lights received single-colour red lenses (for North American market) or red-and-amber lenses (for the European and international markets) instead of the red and white lenses of the pre-facelift models.

A slight revision to the folding 'Vario-roof' hardtop meant it could deploy at up to 40 km/h (25 mph) without the luggage compartment partition having to be deployed in a separate manual operation.

=== Model range ===
- SL 350: (2012–2014), 3.5 L V6 (sold as a 2015 Model year in Japan)
- SL 400/SL 450: (2014–2020), 3.0 L V6 (SL 450 is exclusive to the North American market)
- SL 500/SL 550: (2012–2020), 4.7 L V8 (SL 550 is exclusive to the North American market)
- SL 63 AMG: (2012–2018), 5.5 L V8
- SL 65 AMG: (2012–2018), 6.08 L V12

== R232 (2022–present) ==
Seventh generation
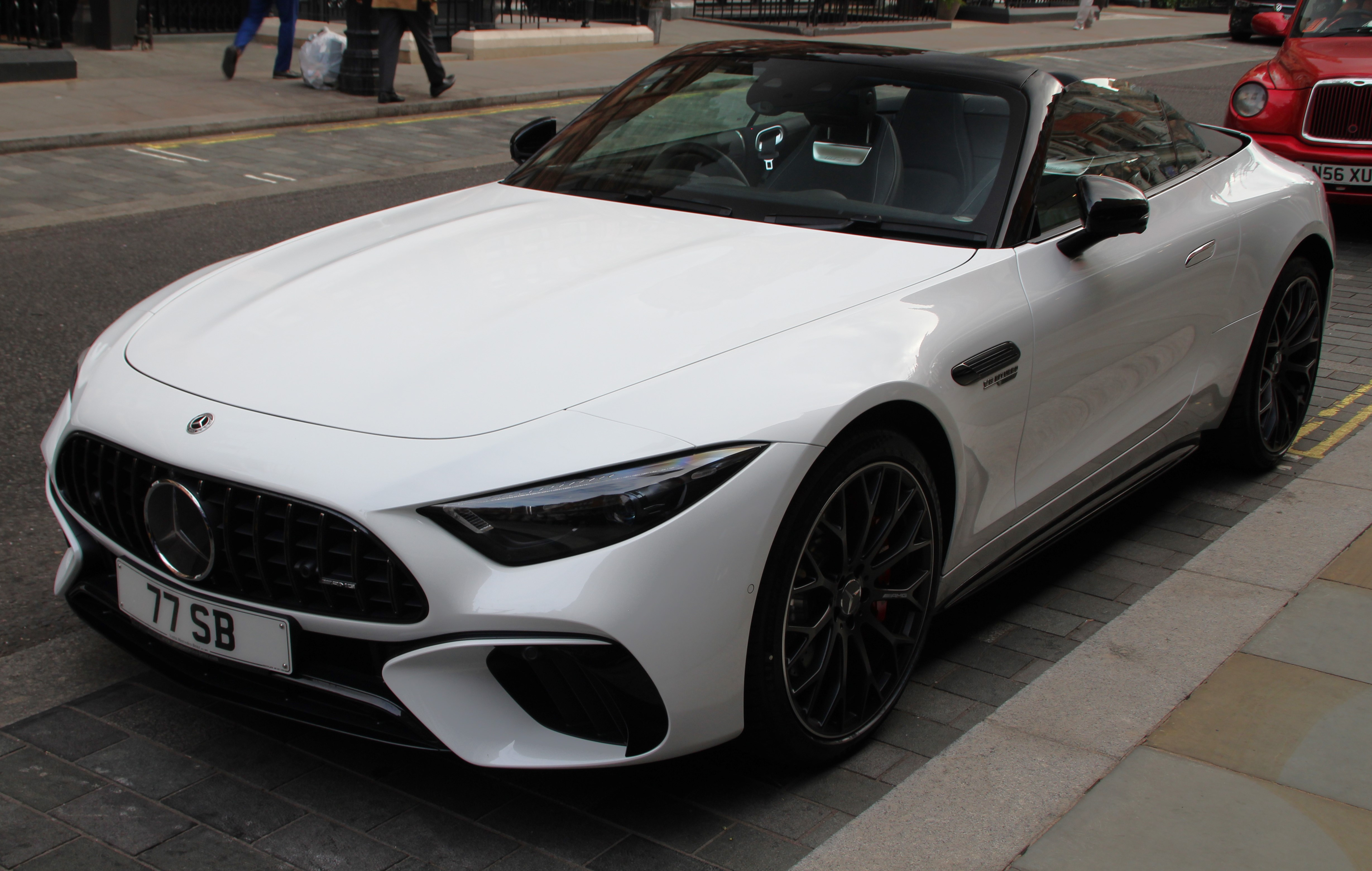

Overview
- Production: 2022–present

Powertrain
- Engine: Petrol: 2.0 L 280 kW (375 hp) M139 mild hybrid turbo (EQ Boost) I4; 4.0 L 350–430 kW (469–577 hp) M177 V8 Biturbo
- Transmission: 9-speed automatic AMG Speedshift

Dimensions
- Wheelbase: 2,700 mm (106.3 in)
- Length: 4,705 mm (185.2 in)
- Width: 1,915 mm (75.4 in)
- Height: 1,359 mm (53.5 in)

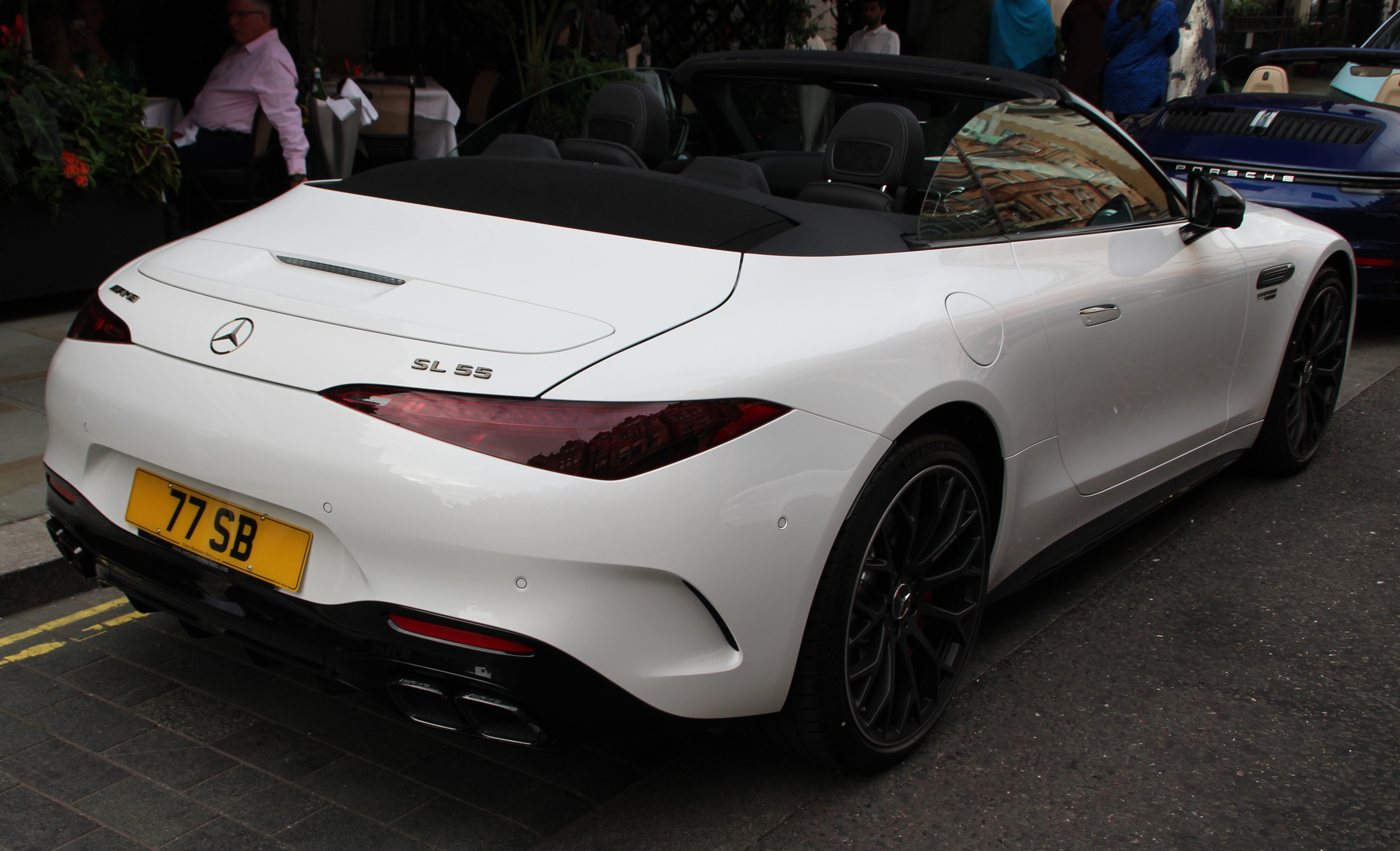
Rear view

The seventh generation of the SL-Class was presented in October 2021. The R232 is confirmed to be an AMG model only, designating it as Mercedes-AMG SL-Class. There are three powertrains, the entry-level powertrain being a 2.0L I4 mild hybrid engine found in the SL 43, producing 280 kW (375 hp). Two of the powertrains are 4.0L V8 Biturbo gasoline engines, with the SL 55 developing a maximum of 350 kW (476 PS; 469 bhp) & 700 N⋅m (516 lb⋅ft), and the SL 63 developing a maximum of 430 kW (585 PS; 577 bhp) & 800 N⋅m (590 lb⋅ft). Both versions are available only with all-wheel-drive, a first for the SL-Class. The R232 is reverting to the soft fabric roof rather than the heavier retractable hardtop that was fitted to the R230 and R231.

This generation is the first SL-Class to have the 2+2 seating configuration as standard rather than optional fitment since 1989 with the introduction of R129. While R107 was built to be two-seater convertible, the owners could opt for the 2+2 seating configuration when ordering their R107 or for the retrofit kit to be installed in their R107 at later date. The rear seats are optimal for the passengers whose height is up to 1.5 metres.

The dashboard is symmetrical along with the 12.3-inch digital instrument cluster and an 11.9-inch touchscreen panel in the centre. The instrument cluster is placed within a binnacle as to reduce the reflections from the sunlight and improve the legibility when the roof is folded down. The touchscreen panel in the centre is electrically tiltable to the vertical position for the same reason.

== Sales ==
Calendar year	US sales
2001	4,217
2002	13,717
2003	13,318
2004	12,885
2005	10,080
2006	8,462
2007	6,126
2008	5,464
2009	4,025
2010	1,449
2011	4,899
2012	5,233
2013	7,007
2014	5,030
2015	4,060
2016	3,722
2017	2,940
2018	2,126

== See also ==
- Lexus LC
- BMW 8 Series
