= Mercedes-Benz W194 =

Mercedes-Benz entry for the 1952 Sportscar racing season, its first after World War II

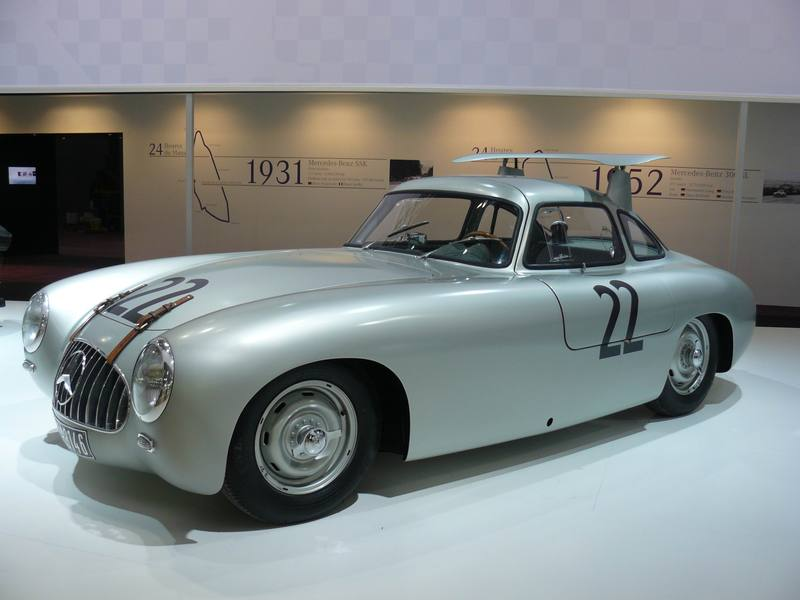
- Mercedes-Benz W194 with air brake
- Category: Endurance racing
- Constructor: Mercedes-Benz
- Designer: Rudolf Uhlenhaut

Technical specifications
- Engine: 3.0 L M194 I6

Competition history
- Notable entrants: Daimler Benz AG
- Notable drivers: (Germany) Hans Klenk (Germany) Karl Kling (Germany) Hermann Lang (Germany) Rudolf Caracciola (United States) John Fitch

The Mercedes-Benz W194 (also called 300 SL) is an endurance racer produced by Mercedes-Benz for the 1952 Sportscar racing season, its first after World War II.

Powered by the 3.0 litre SOHC straight-6 M194 engine, it ran off an impressive string of victories that included 24 Hours of Le Mans, Bern-Bremgarten, the Eifelrennen at Nürburgring, and Mexico's Carrera Panamericana.

Only ten W194s were made. This led to the iconic Mercedes 300 SL W198 Gullwing road car in 1954. The W194 was succeeded, as race car, by the W196 Mercedes-Benz 300 SLR in 1955.

== Design ==
The racing W194 300 SL was built around a mere 140–150-pound welded SAE 4130 steel tube spaceframe chassis to offset the relatively underpowered M194 engine. Designed by Daimler-Benz's chief developing engineer, Rudolf Uhlenhaut, the metal skeleton saved weight while still providing a high level of strength. Since it enveloped the passenger compartment traditional doors were impossible, giving birth to the model's distinctive gull-wing arrangement, with the doors not yet cut into the top half of the car's side. In the first versions only the windows opened, but Le Mans demanded bigger doors, thus new chassis had to be made.

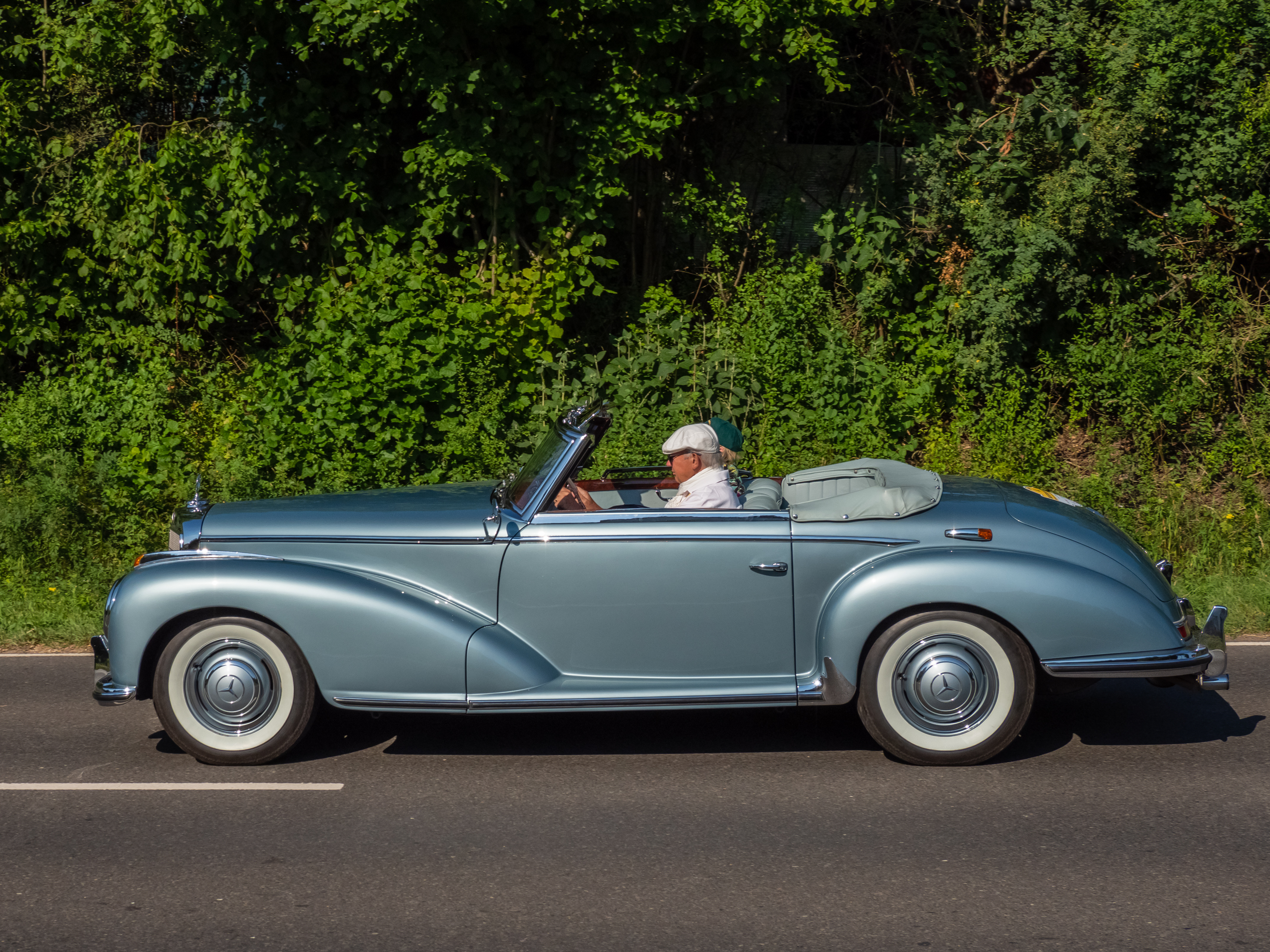
Engine and parts were taken from the Mercedes-Benz 300 S (W188)

Like the production W198 300 SL "Gullwing" it birthed, the W194 used a variant of the overhead cam straight 6 M186 engine introduced with the flagship four-door 300 (W186 "Adenauer") luxury tourer in 1951. Its M194 engine received the high-output triple two-barrel Solex carburetor setup from the exclusive 300 S (W188) coupe/cabriolet. Designed with an innovative diagonal aluminium head (that allowed for larger intake and exhaust valves) and canted at a fifty-degree angle to the left to fit under the W194's much lower hoodline, it produced 175 hp (130 kW) in racing trim, considerably up from the 300's 150 hp (112 kW). Maximum torque was 207 N⋅m (153 lb⋅ft). Top speed was approximately 160 mph (257 km/h). A mechanical direct fuel-injected version of the M194, the M198, was developed two years later for the introduction of the production 300SL in 1954.

Aerodynamics played an important role in the 2,497 pound car's speed. Unlike many cars of the 1950s, steering was relatively precise and the four-wheel independent suspension allowed for a reasonably comfortable ride and markedly better overall handling. However, the rear swing axle, jointed only at the differential, not at the wheels themselves, could be treacherous at high speeds or on imperfect roads due to extreme changes in camber. The enormous fuel tank capacity also caused a considerable difference in handling depending on the quantity of fuel on board.

== Racing history ==
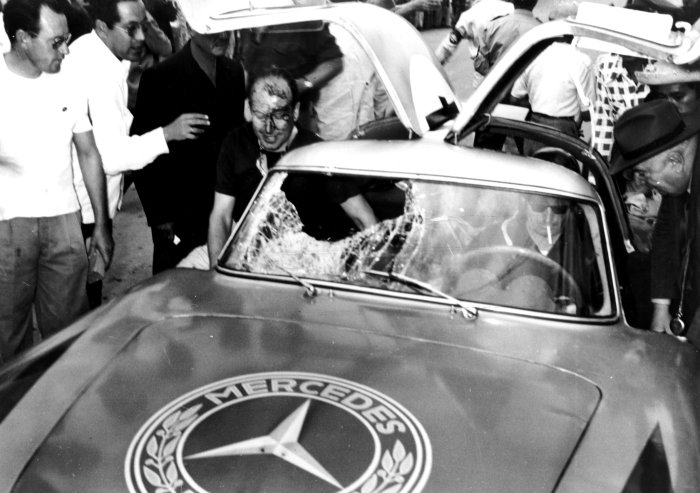
300SL Gullwing at the Carrera Panamericana after collision with a vulture.

The 300 SL was raced only in 1952, one year before the World Sportscar Championship was introduced with the inaugural 1953 World Sportscar Championship that had seven races. Four of them (Sebring, MM, LM and Carrera) were already run in 1952, and would be run again in 1954, thus can be called the "core" races of the WSC, and part of a hypothetical 1952 WSC season.

Considering that only the four best results counted in the first WSC seasons, the two 1-2 wins by Mercedes at Le Mans and the Carrera, plus a 2nd place at the Mille and a no show at Sebring, would have secured the hypothetical 1952 championship with 22 points out of a maximum of 32, with Ferrari in second (one win and 19 points).

=== 1952 World Sportscar "Championship" season ===
Hypothetical 1952 World Sportscar "Championship" season, compared to the seven rounds included into the 1953 World Sportscar Championship.

Rd.	Date	Event Circuit or Location	Winning driver(s)	Winning team	Winning car(s)	Results
1	15/03	(United States) 12 Hours of Sebring; Sebring International Raceway	(United States) Larry Kulok (United States) Harry Grey	(United States) J. S. Donaldson	Frazer Nash Le Mans Replica	Results
2	03/05; 04/05	(Italy) Mille Miglia; Brescia-Rome-Brescia	(Italy) Giovanni Bracco (Italy) Alfonso Rolfo	(Italy) Scuderia Ferrari	Ferrari 250 S	Results; Ergebnis
	18/05	(Switzerland) Bern Grand Prix at '52 Swiss GP; Circuit Bremgarten	(West Germany) Karl Kling	(West Germany) Daimler Benz AG	Mercedes 300 SL (1-2-3)	Results
	02/06	1952 Monaco Grand Prix; Circuit de Monaco	(Italy) Vittorio Marzotto	(Italy) Scuderia Marzotto	Ferrari 225 S (1-2-3-4-5)	Results
3	14/06; 15/06	(France) 24 Hours of Le Mans; Circuit de la Sarthe	(West Germany) Hermann Lang (West Germany) Fritz Riess	(West Germany) Daimler Benz AG	Mercedes 300 SL (1-2)	Results
4	(July)	(Belgium) 24 Hours de Spa; Circuit de Spa-Francorchamps				
	3 Aug.	(West Germany) 1952 German Grand Prix; Nürburgring Nordschleife			Mercedes 300 SL (1-2-3-4)	Sport race results
5	(Aug.)	(West Germany) ADAC 1000km Nürburgring; Nürburgring Nordschleife				
6	(Sep)	(United Kingdom) RAC Tourist Trophy; Dundrod Circuit				
7	19/11; 23/11	(Mexico) Carrera Panamericana; Tuxtla Gutiérrez-Ciudad Juárez	(West Germany) Karl Kling (West Germany) Hans Klenk	(West Germany) Daimler Benz AG	Mercedes 300 SL (1-2)	Results

At its first outing, the 2 May 1952 Mille Miglia, the W194 managed second and fourth places, only beaten by a well-driven new Ferrari 250 S.

Only two weeks after the Mille Miglia, the "Silver Arrows" returned, some painted in colors usually found on other cars. For the 18 May 1952 Bern Grand Prix at Circuit Bremgarten that supported the 1952 Swiss Grand Prix (F1/F2 and motorcycles), Daimler Benz brought cars for four drivers: No. 16 dark red Rudolf Caracciola, No. 18 green Karl Kling, No. 20 powder blue Hermann Lang, No. 22 silver Fritz Riess. With factory teams present for the GP, Scuderia Lancia and Aston Martin entered two cars, Scuderia Ferrari one. The Daetwyler-Ferrari 340 America with a 4.1 liter V12 was on pole, but after 18 laps it was a dominant Mercedes 1-2-3 victory, with the field one lap down. Rudolf Caracciola crashed out in lap 14 while racing his old rival Lang. A broken leg ended his career.

The 1952 Monaco Grand Prix was a non-championship sports car race held on 2 June 1952 at Monaco. Mercedes remained absent, but it had factory entries by Aston Martin and Jaguar, plus some privately entered French cars, and was won 1-5 by private Ferrari 225 S. Luigi Fagioli, GP winner for Mercedes in 1935, crashed and died weeks later, thus he and Caracciola could not race at Le Mans.

Mercedes had to rework the 300SL for the 1952 24 Hours of Le Mans as the original "gullwing windows" above the side sills were considered too small by the ACO organizers. New chassis with larger openings were made. In addition, an air brake above the roof was tested, but unlike in 1955, not yet allowed to race. Mercedes scored a 1-2 win.

The Nürburgring had not introduced the 1000km yet, but ran sports car races within events like the Eifelrennen which accommodated different kinds of racing, usually motorcycle races and various automobile races, until incompatible safety requirements ended the combination in the 1970s. The 25 May 1952 Eifelrennen main event was run to Formula 2 rules, the same type of cars the Driver World Championship (aka F1) was contested in 1952 and 1953. 1952 was the 25th anniversary of the race track, and a sports car race dubbed the XV. Großer Preis von Deutschland – Großer Jubiläumspreis vom Nürburgring für Sportwagen 1952 was run to support the 3 August 1952 German Grand Prix. The 10-lap race in the mountains favoured low weight and good handling over low drag and endurance, thus Mercedes used the original high side chassis, but as Spyder without any roof or door. Announced as a surprise, one car was tested with a supercharged M197 engine which put it in the "S 5000-8000cc" class. Additional power was not needed, though. The race was a 1-2-3-4 triumph for Mercedes, ahead of private Ferrari and Jaguar.

Mercedes had taken notice of the growing importance of the Carrera Panamericana road race in Mexico, and entered three gullwings in November 1952. They finished 1-2 while the third car was disqualified.

These successes, especially those on the high speed open road races, were rather surprising as the M194 engine was fitted only with carburetors (triple 2-barrel Solex), producing 175 hp (130 kW), which was not only less than the competing cars by Ferrari and Jaguar, but also far less than, only two years later in 1954, the fuel-injected W198 300 SL road car developed from it. Low weight and low aerodynamic drag made the W194 fast enough to be competitive in endurance races.

== Production 300 SL (W198) ==
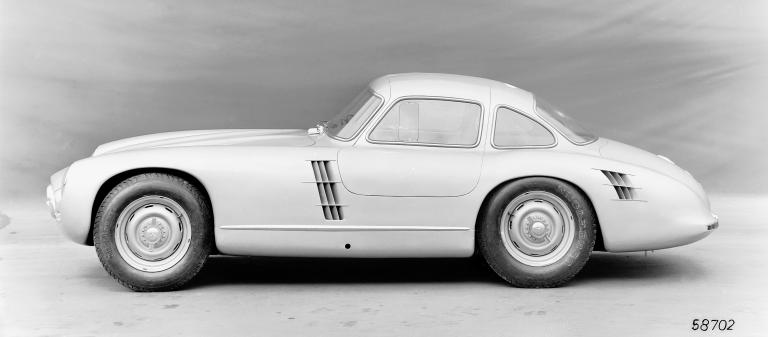
1953 prototype 300SL

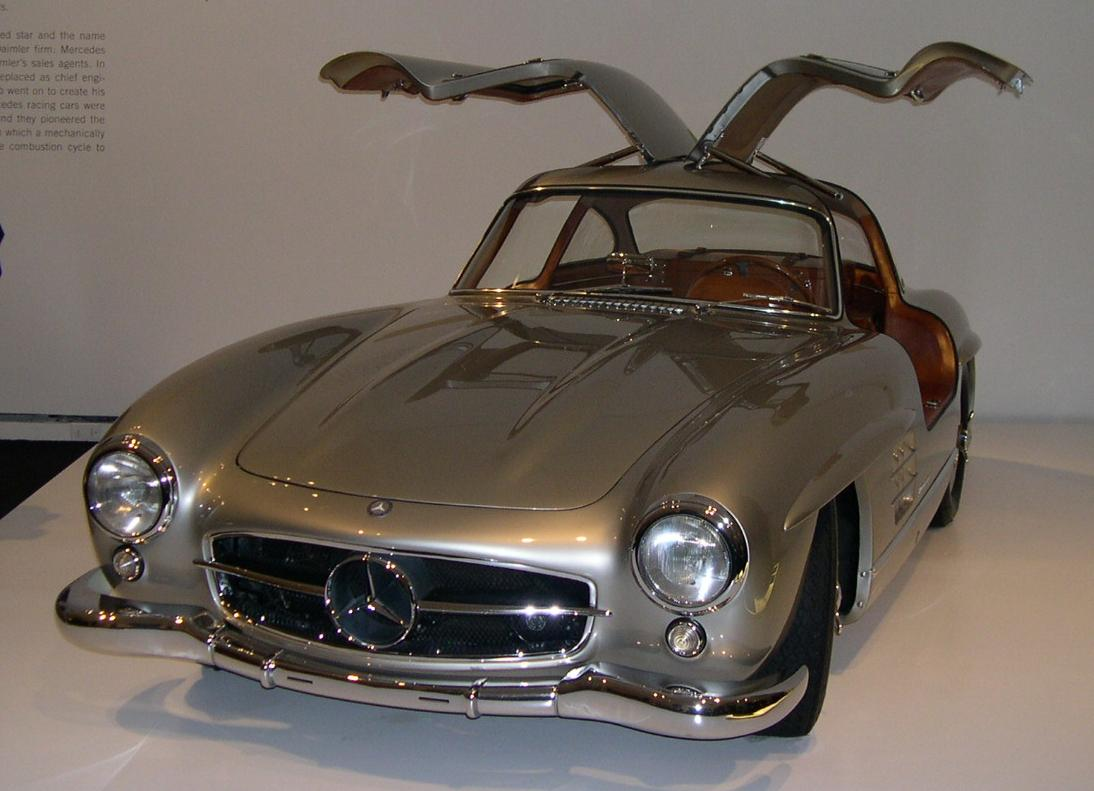
1954 Mercedes-Benz 300 SL Gullwing Coupé

Daimler-Benz's official importer in the US, New York Mercedes distributor Max Hoffman, suggested to company management in Stuttgart that a street version of the W194 would be a commercial success, especially in America. The result was an icon, the 1954 Mercedes-Benz 300 SL Gullwing (W198).

More than 80% of the vehicle's total production of approximately 1,400 units were sold in the US, making the Gullwing the first Mercedes-Benz widely successful outside its home market and thoroughly validating Hoffman's prediction. The 300 SL is credited with changing the company's image in America from a manufacturer of solid but staid luxury automobiles to one capable of rendering high-performance sports cars.

== The W194 today ==
The W194 is regarded by some as the most important post-WW2 Mercedes-Benz made as its Carrera Panamericana success secured a future for Mercedes-Benz in North America where the Corvette appeared in January 1953. It is unknown how many of the original ten W194 chassis remain. Only one never raced, Chassis #00002, which served as a parts and training car. It has been fully restored by a Mercedes-Benz team and though not for sale received multiple offers of US$15 million in 2012.

== See also ==
- Mercedes-Benz W196
- Mercedes-Benz 300 SLR (W196S)
- Mercedes-Benz SL-Class
