= Mercedes-Benz M194 engine =

Mercedes-Benz M194

Overview
- Manufacturer: Mercedes-Benz
- Production: 1952

Layout
- Configuration: Straight-six engine
- Displacement: 3.0 L (2,996 cc)
- Cylinder bore: 85.0 mm
- Piston stroke: 88.0 mm
- Cylinder block material: Cast iron
- Cylinder head material: Aluminium alloy
- Valvetrain: SOHC
- Compression ratio: 8:1

Combustion
- Fuel system: 3 2-barrel Solex carburetors
- Fuel type: Petrol

The M194 is a straight-six engine produced by Daimler-Benz in limited numbers for its 1952 W194 300SL sports car racer that was entered in endurance races, winning most of them.

== Design ==
The M194 is based on the M186 engine from the then-new W186 300, exactly speaking on the M188 variant in the two-door W188 300S which had three Solex carburetors and 150 hp rather than two and only 115 hp in the limousine.

In any case it is a four-stroke engine six cylinder in line with two valves per cylinder. The engine is titled 50 degrees to the left in order to reduce the height of the hood. It uses a dry sump lubrication system instead of an oil pan and reservoir. It is also mounted behind the front axle for better weight distribution. Only 10 M194 engines were made for the W194 300SL racer; the first three cars had around 170 hp (127 kW), while the remaining seven had around 180 hp (134 kW).

== 300 SL Kompressor (M197) ==
For the Nürburgring sprint race event that supported the 1952 German Grand Prix, which did not favour endurance over power, Mercedes had announced a surprise. One car was fitted with the M197 engine version that had a blower, which was permitted in the "S 5000-8000cc" class, with the supercharged 3 litre treated as 6 litre. This "300SL K" had a bulge on the left side of the hood for the additional Kompressor, and was only used in practice, by Karl Kling. Being driven at a GP race weekend, it was the last Mercedes-Benz supercharged Grand Prix racing engine. The normal cars won 1-2-3-4 anyway.

== Models ==
Engine	Power	Torque	Years
M194	125 kW (168 hp) at 5,200 rpm	256 N⋅m (189 lb⋅ft) at 4,200 rpm	1952

Application:

- 1952 W194 300SL

== See also ==
- List of Mercedes-Benz engines
