= Rudolf Uhlenhaut =

British-German engineer (1906–1989)

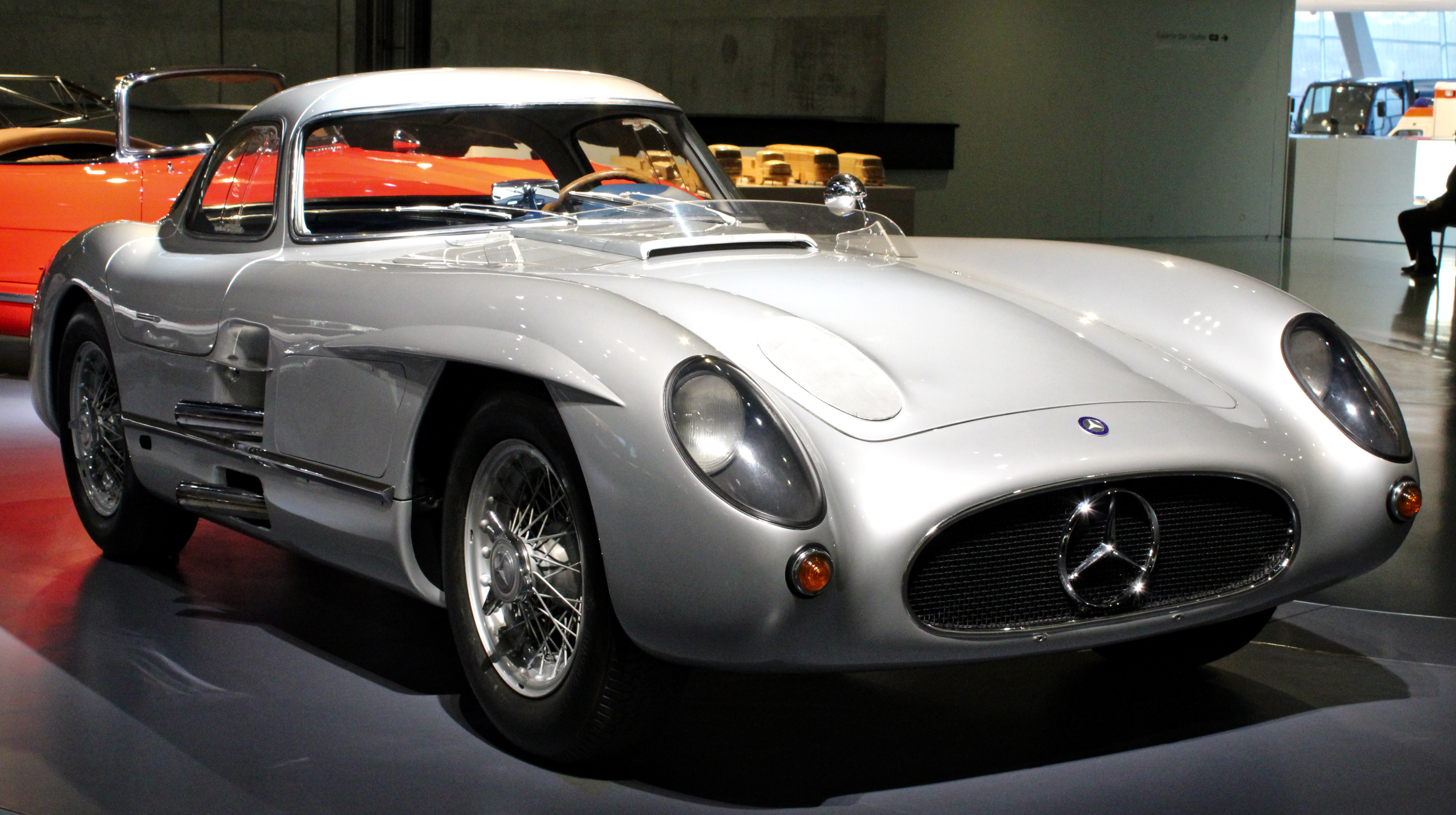
Uhlenhaut's 300SLR coupé, in the Mercedes-Benz museum in Stuttgart-Untertürkheim

Rudolf Uhlenhaut (15 July 1906 – 8 May 1989) was a British-German engineer, driving engineer for Mercedes-Benz, and the father of Mercedes-Benz 300 SL and 300 SLR. He had a long association with the Mercedes-Benz racing programme of the 1930s and 1950s, and is best known for his road legal Uhlenhaut Coupé version of the 1955 Mercedes-Benz 300SLR race car.

== Early life ==
Uhlenhaut was born in London, the second of four children, on 15 July 1906, during his German-born father Max Uhlenhaut's term as head of the London branch of the Deutsche Bank. His mother, Hilda Brice, was English. He attended the Tollington School in Muswell Hill. At the outbreak of World War I in 1914 the family moved to Brussels, and later to Bremen. After finishing his schooling, in 1926 he took up a place at the Technical University of Munich to study engineering, during which, as an avid skier, he spent much time in the Bavarian Alps.

== Career ==
In 1931 Uhlenhaut joined Mercedes-Benz, working under Fritz Nallinger on the development of the Mercedes 170V. In 1936 Uhlenhaut assumed leadership of the race car department. Auto Union dominated the 1936 Grand Prix season over the aging Mercedes-Benz W25. As a talented driver in his own right, he was able to spot the deficiencies of the chassis and suspension, however he never raced competitively as he was needed for his engineering skills. The replacement for the W25, the Mercedes-Benz W125, remedied the chassis and suspension shortcomings and was much more powerful. The W125 dominated the 1937 Grand Prix season, and was considered the most powerful Grand Prix car until the turbocharged cars of the early 1980s. In 1938 rule changes necessitated a new car for 1938 Grand Prix season, the Mercedes-Benz W154.

At the outbreak of World War II the racing team ceased, and Uhlenhaut was placed under constant surveillance by the Gestapo, due to his dual nationality. Uhlenhaut began working for Daimler-Benz aircraft engines, designing and developing cylinder heads thanks to his previous work on the Daimler-Benz DB 603. After cessation of hostilities, he founded a small transport business, using ex-Wehrmacht trucks fuelled by methane gas. He was then contacted by an old friend, who was by now a Major in the Royal Electrical and Mechanical Engineers (REME), and contracted to work on reconstruction projects.

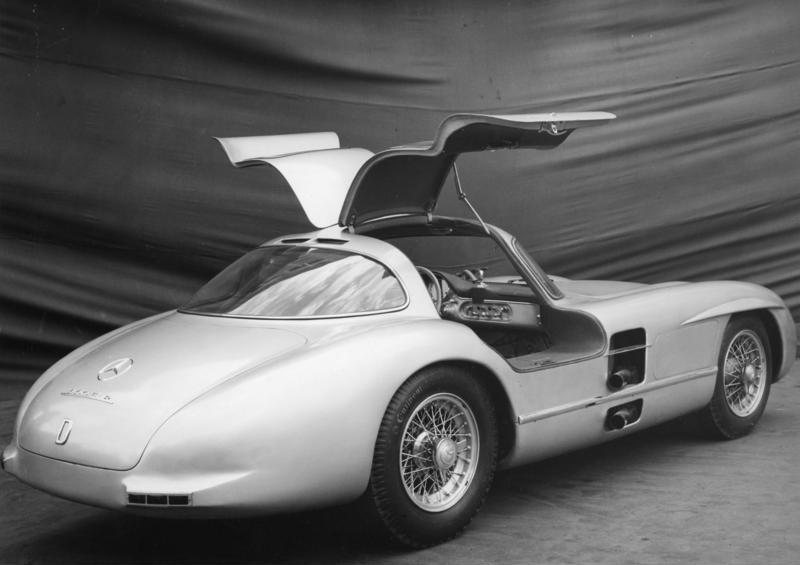
Gull-wing doors, as used on the Mercedes-Benz 300 SL introduced a year earlier, were a signature feature of the Uhlenhaut Coupé

Having returned to Mercedes-Benz in 1948, in 1952 Uhlenhaut designed the Mercedes-Benz W194 "300SL" race car based on the engine and chassis of the Mercedes-Benz W186 limousine. The underpowered car achieved surprising success, winning important sports car races such as the 24 Hours of Le Mans, and inspired the road-going Mercedes-Benz W198 "300SL Gullwing" of 1954.

The Mercedes-Benz W196 won the F1 Championship in 1954 and 1955. Uhlenhaut surpassed even Juan Manuel Fangio's times in test sessions.

Based on the Mercedes-Benz 300 SLR sport racer of 1955, Uhlenhaut created a road legal SLR/SL hybrid. Capable of approaching 290 km/h (180 mph), the 300 SLR Uhlenhaut Coupé easily earned the reputation of being the era's fastest road car. A story circulates that running late for a meeting Uhlenhaut roared up the autobahn from Munich to Stuttgart in just over an hour, a 137 mile/220 km journey that today takes two-and-a-half.

Uhlenhaut, who never owned a car of his own, retired in 1972. In later life he needed hearing aids, possibly due to damage caused by his loud cars. He died in Stuttgart on 8 May 1989.
